= The Challenge: Free Agents =

25th season of the reality television series

Free Agents
- Season 25
- Presented by: T. J. Lavin
- No. of contestants: 28
- Winners: Johnny "Bananas" Devenanzio; Laurel Stucky
- Location: Punta del Este, Uruguay; Pucón, Chile
- No. of episodes: 13 (Reunion Included)

Release
- Original network: MTV
- Original release: April 10 – June 26, 2014

Season chronology
- ← Previous; Rivals II Next → Battle of the Exes II

The Challenge: Free Agents is the 25th season of the MTV reality game show The Challenge. The season is located in Uruguay and Chile, with former cast members from The Real World and The Challenge competing. The season follows a new format, featuring each contestant competing in either teams, pairs, or for themselves, for a share of $350,000 in prize money.

The season premiered with a special 90-minute episode on April 10, 2014 on MTV, marking the first time the show aired on a night other than a Wednesday since season 14 aired in 2007. The season concluded its run on June 26, 2014 with the Reunion special. This season marks the first since season 11 that does not include any cast members from The Real World: Austin.

== Format ==
Prior to each challenge, it is announced whether it is going to be an individual, pair, or team challenge. For pair and team challenges, names are drawn out of a bag — one of each gender, or more for multi-team or pair challenges — that are designated as captains. For team challenges, the captains select players evenly amongst gender. For pair challenges, the captains either select players of the opposite gender for challenges that are designated as male/female pairs, or the same gender for challenges that are designated as same-gender pairs.

After each challenge, the winning teams/pairs/players are not only safe from elimination, but also choose one player of each gender to compete in the elimination round. If a challenge is played in a team or pair format, each member of the winning pair/team is safe from elimination. The losing players then participate in an elimination vote called "The Draw", in which each player either flip over a "kill card", which has a skeleton symbol, or a blank card. If a player flips over a blank card, that player saves himself/herself from participating in the elimination, however, if a player flips over the "kill card", that player has to face the player of the respective gender that was previously voted by the winning team/pair/individual in the elimination. The winning players of each gender return to the game and have a shot at competing for a $350,000 prize, while the losing male and female players are eliminated from the game.

At the end of the season, six players compete in the final challenge — three of each gender. The first-place finishers each win $125,000, second-place contestants each win $35,000 and third-place contestants each win $15,000.

== Contestants ==
Male contestants	Original season	Finish
Johnny "Bananas" Devenanzio	The Real World: Key West	Winner
Johnny Reilly	The Real World: Portland	Runner-up
Zach Nichols	The Real World: San Diego (2011)	Third place
Chris "CT" Tamburello	The Real World: Paris	Episode 11
Leroy Garrett	The Real World: Las Vegas (2011)	Episode 11
Cohutta Grindstaff	The Real World: Sydney	Episode 9
Preston Charles	The Real World: New Orleans (2010)	Episode 8
Jordan Wiseley	The Real World: Portland	Episode 7
Brandon Swift	The Real World: St. Thomas	Episode 6
Isaac Stout	The Real World: Sydney	Episode 5
Brandon Nelson	The Challenge: Fresh Meat II	Episode 4
Frank Sweeney	The Real World: San Diego (2011)	Episode 3 (Note: Prior to the "Bar Crawl" challenge in Episode 3, it was announced that doctors diagnosed Frank with a contagious viral lung infection, and he was removed from the competition. Frank has since disputed this reasoning, saying the nurse told him he had pneumonia and not a viral infection.)
Dustin Zito	The Real World: Las Vegas (2011)	Episode 2
Chet Cannon	The Real World: Brooklyn	Episode 1 (Note: Chet withdrew from the "Balls In" elimination, after sustaining an open wound on his chin. He was given the option to either continue the elimination round with a bandage, or get stitches and forfeit. Chet chose the latter option.)

Female contestants	Original season	Finish
Laurel Stucky	The Challenge: Fresh Meat II	Winner
Nany González	The Real World: Las Vegas (2011)	Runner-up
Devyn Simone	The Real World: Brooklyn	Third place
Theresa González	The Challenge: Fresh Meat II	Episode 11
Cara Maria Sorbello	The Challenge: Fresh Meat II	Episode 11
Jessica McCain	The Real World: Portland	Episode 9
Aneesa Ferreira	The Real World: Chicago	Episode 8
Jonna Mannion	The Real World: Cancun	Episode 7
Camila Nakagawa	Spring Break Challenge	Episode 6
Jasmine Reynaud	The Real World: Cancun	Episode 5
LaToya Jackson	The Real World: St. Thomas	Episode 4
Nia Moore	The Real World: Portland	Episode 3
Emilee Fitzpatrick	The Real World: Cancun	Episode 2
Jemmye Carroll	The Real World: New Orleans (2010)	Episode 1

=== Jersey numbers ===
Contestants had numbers on the backs of their jerseys. All of the male contestants wore odd-numbered jerseys, while the females wore even-numbered jerseys.

01	CT	15	Cohutta	02	Cara Maria	16	Jessica
03	Bananas	17	Johnny	04	Jemmye	18	LaToya
05	Frank	19	Brandon	06	Devyn	20	Jonna
07	Preston	21	Swift	08	Theresa	22	Emilee
09	Chet	23	Zach	10	Aneesa	24	Laurel
11	Isaac	25	Jordan	12	Jasmine	26	Nia
13	Leroy	27	Dustin	14	Nany	28	Camila

== Gameplay ==
=== Challenge games ===
- Out on a Ledge: Played in two teams of 14 players, each team participates in a multi-stage race to the top of Montevideo's World Trade Center. The teams are then split up into three teams — two of four players and one of six players. The three teams are positioned at three different locations — one four-player team is chained together at the rooftop next to a locked box at a puzzle station, another four-player team is chained together at a plank hanging from the edge of the rooftop, while the six-player team is chained together at the base of the building.
  - In Phase 1, the two six-player teams race against each other through all 42 stories of the World Trade Center, and each team is possessing a key that is required to unchain their respective 4-player team that is chained together at the locked box, where Phase 2 begins.
  - In Phase 2, one four-player team uses a key to unlock a box which contains puzzle pieces. When that team solves their puzzle, another key is retrieved to unchain the other four-player team standing by near the plank.
  - In Phase 3, players from the remaining four-player teams have to race along a plank suspended 450 feet above ground level, one player at a time, then retrieve a pink flag sitting in the middle of a rolling log, and ring a bell in the fastest time possible. The entire challenge is a timed event, and the team that completes the challenge in the fastest time wins, while all members of the losing team are automatically sent to "The Draw."
    - Winners: Team Black (Aneesa, Bananas, Cohutta, CT, Devyn, Jasmine, Jessica, Johnny, Jordan, Laurel, Nany, Nia, Preston, and Swift)
- Auto Body Rally: Played in male/female pairs, each pair has to race in a sports car on a drag strip, then run around a series of hay bales, and ride together on an oversize bicycle within an obstacle course consisting of bales of hay, toward a finish line. When each pair rides the bicycle, one player has to backwards-steer the front of the bicycle while the other pedals in order to navigate through the obstacle course. The team with the fastest time wins the challenge, while the teams with the four slowest times are automatically sent to "The Draw."
  - Winners: Cohutta and Laurel
- Bar Crawl: A giant wall, with platforms on both sides, numerous holes horizontally-aligned at the base of the wall and two oversize bars in two holes, is suspended from a crane over water. Played in teams of four (two players on both sides of the wall), (Note: As a result of Frank's departure due to illness, Team Jasmine competed in the "Bar Crawl" challenge with three players, while the other five teams competed with four players.) each team has to advance from one platform to the other by using the bars as a "walkway." Players on each side have to shove the bars through the holes in order for their partners to advance forward on the bars. It is a timed event, and the team that advances all of their players from one platform to the other in the fastest time wins, while the teams with the two slowest times are automatically sent to "The Draw." A team is disqualified if they do not complete the challenge within a time limit, or if any team member drops a bar into the water.
  - Winners: Team Brandon (Brandon, Bananas, Camila and Jessica)
- Bounce Out: First, players are separated into two teams of 11 players. Then, the two teams are split into two groups — of six and five players. Each player wears oversize plastic bumper suits with pictures of their faces on them, and the groups have to designate one player to serve as "the ball", in which that player try to advance from one side of a beach to another, toward a soccer goal. The remaining players either try to defend their own goal or help escort the designated "ball" toward their opponent's goal. After one group scores a goal, the other group takes the field and try to do the same. The first team to score three goals wins the challenge, while all members of the losing team are automatically sent to "The Draw."
  - Winners: Team Red (Bananas, CT, Jessica, Johnny, Jonna, Jordan, Laurel, Nany, Preston, Swift, and Theresa)
- Piggy Back: First, players are separated into two teams of ten — five of each gender. Then, each team has to advance on ten hanging ropes from one platform to another that is suspended above water. After one player advances onto one rope, the next teammate has to use the first player as a "human bridge" in order to advance to the next rope. Subsequent players continue the process, until each player is hanging into their own rope, at which point, players continue to use their teammates as "human bridges" in order to reach the opposite platform. Players are disqualified if they don't grab each rope. The team that advances the most players from one platform to the other in the fastest time wins, while all members of the losing team are automatically sent to "The Draw."
  - Winners: Team Purple (Cara Maria, Devyn, Jessica, Johnny, Jonna, Jordan, Leroy, Swift, Theresa, and Zach)
- Smarty Pants: Played as an individual challenge, host T. J. Lavin asks each player a series of trivia questions, which includes spelling, sports, geography, pop culture, and U.S. history. The challenge is played in multiple rounds — separated by gender. Each player is hanging by a rope from a platform suspended above water, and if they correctly answer a question, they will stay in the game, but will get a red X for each wrong answer. If a player gets two red X's, he/she is dropped into the water. The first four players of each gender to be dropped into the water are automatically sent to "The Draw", while the last player of each gender standing wins the challenge.
  - Winners: Zach and Devyn
- Sausage Party: Played as an individual challenge, players have to roll themselves along a "barbecue-style" obstacle course on the beach, while covered in shrink wrap. The challenge is played in two separate heats — one for each gender. Player wiggle and roll through a variety of "condiments" and on oversize metal bars that resemble a grill grate, towards a series of oversize circular discs at the end of the course that resemble bread buns. The first player that makes his/her way through the course and onto the oversize "bread buns" wins, while the three players in each heat that do not make it to the buns are automatically sent to "The Draw."
  - Winners: Johnny and Laurel
- Hold That Pose: Played in two teams of seven, all members of each team have to grab hold of a certain color of rope with their feet and hands. There are two ropes with 28 straps — four straps for each player, and once the hands and feet of each player are strapped in, all team members have to hold a pose above the sand for one minute. The first team to hold a pose for one minute without any players touching the ground wins, while all members of the losing team are automatically sent to "The Draw."
  - Winners: Team Devyn (Devyn, Cara Maria, CT, Jessica, Leroy, Nany, and Zach)
- Dug Out: Much like the "T-Bone" elimination from Rivals, players run up and down, through intersecting half-pipes that are dug several feet deep, and have to transfer five colored balls to their partner's ball rack from one side to the other. The challenge is played in same-gender pairs — one round for each gender, and the pair that transfers all of their colored balls — 10 total — to each other's racks wins, while the remaining players are sent to "The Draw."
  - Winners: CT and Zach & Nany and Theresa
- Crossover: Played in male/female pairs, each pair has to advance through a lagoon toward a sandbar, where two designated treasure chests are buried. Inside the treasure chests are oversize puzzle pieces that pairs need to assemble their puzzles. One partner digs through the sand to retrieve the pieces from one chest, then each pair advances back across the lagoon to the sandbar, where the other partner has to digs through the sand in order to retrieve the pieces from the second chest, the players finally advance back across the lagoon to reach their designated puzzle station. The first pair to solve the puzzle wins, while the two last-place pairs are automatically sent to "The Draw."
  - Winners: Bananas and Nany

=== Elimination games ===
- Balls In: Each player is given five chances to get as many balls inside a barrel, located in the middle of a large circle. If a player is either knocked out of or steps out of the ring, or if the ball is knocked out of the ring, their ball is considered "dead." Players alternate between offense and defense in each round. The player who has more baskets than their opponent after five rounds wins the elimination round. Note: Challenge previously used during The Inferno II and Spring Break Challenge.
  - Played by: Chet vs. Frank, Jemmye vs. LaToya, Bananas vs. Isaac, Jasmine vs. Laurel, Cara Maria vs. Jessica and Cohutta vs. Leroy.
- Wrecking Wall: Each player must punch through a 30-foot dry wall to make holes so they can climb up until they can reach a bell. The first player to ring the bell wins the elimination round.
  - Played by: Dustin vs. Frank, Emilee vs. Jonna, Bananas vs. Jordan, Aneesa vs. Jonna, CT vs. Leroy, and Cara Maria vs. Laurel
- Looper: Each player has a rope hooked to their backs and has to run around two posts to reach a bell. The first player to ring the bell wins the elimination round. After its original appearance, a rope was added to each post, allowing competitors to use it to make pulling their opponent easier.
  - Played by: Cara Maria vs. Nia, Jordan vs. Swift and Camila vs. Theresa
- Oppenheimer: Each player must run across a caged circle hallway and passed the other player to ring a bell. The first player to ring the bell twice wins the elimination round.
  - Played by: Cara Maria vs. LaToya, Brandon vs. Zach, Cohutta vs. Preston and Aneesa vs. Laurel
- Puzzle Pyramid: Each player has three puzzles to solve. After solving one puzzle, they will step up onto a podium until they reach the final puzzle. The first person to complete all three puzzles and ring the bell wins.
  - Puzzle #1 (In Shape): Players must fit all the provided pieces of a tangram puzzle in the provided shape.
  - Puzzle #2 (All Lined Up): Players must arrange puzzle pieces so that a complete and unbroken line is formed.
  - Puzzle #3 (It All Adds Up): Players must arrange numbered blocks on the puzzle board so that the sum of each row, column, and diagonal line equals 15.
  - Played by: Bananas vs. CT and Laurel vs. Theresa

=== Final challenge ===
The final challenge is a five-stage competition in a race to the top of Villarica. The first three stages are played in male/female pairs, while the last two stages are individual. Each guy is paired with each girl in the initial three stages. When each player reaches the top of the volcano, their accumulated times from each stage are added up. The guy and girl with the fastest accumulated times win $125,000 apiece. The second-place finishers win $35,000 each, while the third-place finishers win $15,000 each. Contestants must complete all five stages of the final challenge in order to receive the monetary prize.

- Stage 1: Each pair races in a kayak. Bananas is paired with Laurel, Johnny is paired with Nany, and Zach is paired with Devyn.
  - Bananas and Laurel – 40 minutes
  - Nany and Johnny – 44 minutes 53 seconds
  - Zach and Devyn – 58 minutes 21 seconds
- Stage 2: Each pair races in a 10K run which gains 2,000 feet (610 m) through a mountain trail. Johnny is paired with Laurel, Zach is paired with Nany, and Bananas is paired with Devyn. At the end of the trail, each pair has to solve a puzzle entitled "Latitude Problems", in which they have to stack a series of wooden discs in a pole that contain city names in geographical order from north to south. If a pair does not correctly solve the puzzle within a 30-minute time limit, they are permitted to reach the finish line to complete Stage 2.
  - Johnny and Laurel – 1 hour 23 minutes 54 seconds
  - Zach and Nany – 1 hour 30 minutes
  - Bananas and Devyn – 1 hour 34 minutes 47 seconds
- After Stage 2, the total times are:
  - Johnny – 2 hours 8 minutes 54 seconds
  - Bananas – 2 hours 14 minutes 47 seconds
  - Zach – 2 hours 28 minutes 21 seconds
  - Laurel – 2 hours 3 minutes 54 seconds
  - Nany – 2 hours 14 minutes 53 seconds
  - Devyn – 2 hours 33 minutes 8 seconds
- Stage 3: Each pair has to climb up a steep and rocky mountainside. Bananas is paired with Nany, Zach is paired with Laurel and Johnny is paired with Devyn. Due to the steep and rocky terrain, pairs are given staggered starts every 15 minutes in random order.
  - Bananas and Nany – 2 hours 19 minutes 14 seconds
  - Zach and Laurel – 2 hours 39 minutes 36 seconds
  - Johnny and Devyn – 2 hours 52 minutes 45 seconds
- After Stage 3, the total times are:
  - Bananas – 4 hours 34 minutes 1 second
  - Johnny – 5 hours 1 minute 32 seconds
  - Zach – 5 hours 7 minutes 57 seconds
  - Nany – 4 hours 34 minutes 7 seconds
  - Laurel – 4 hours 43 minutes 30 seconds
  - Devyn – 5 hours 25 minutes 53 seconds
- Stage 4: Each contestant has to pedal 25 miles on a stationary bike before seeking a meal and overnight rest in a nearby tent.
  - Bananas – 1 hour 1 minute
  - Johnny – 1 hour 23 minutes
  - Zach – 1 hour 31 minutes
  - Laurel – 1 hour 32 minutes
  - Nany – 1 hour 50 minutes
  - Devyn – 2 hours 43 minutes
- After Stage 4, the total times are (with previous seconds rounded to the nearest minute since seconds are no longer reported):
  - Bananas – 5 hours 35 minutes
  - Johnny – 6 hours 25 minutes
  - Zach – 6 hours 39 minutes
  - Laurel – 6 hours 16 minutes
  - Nany – 6 hours 24 minutes
  - Devyn – 8 hours 9 minutes
- Stage 5: Each competitor has to climb up the snow-covered slopes of Villarica.
  - Johnny – 2 hours 4 minutes
  - Bananas – 2 hours 36 minutes
  - Laurel – 3 hours 10 minutes 38 seconds
  - Nany – 3 hours 10 minutes 42 seconds
  - Zach – 3 hours 37 minutes
  - Devyn – 4 hours 30 minutes

Overall placement and time

- Males
  - Bananas – 8 hours 11 minutes (winner)
  - Johnny – 8 hours 29 minutes (second place)
  - Zach – 10 hours 16 minutes (third place)
- Females
  - Laurel – 9 hours 26 minutes (winner)
  - Nany – 9 hours 34 minutes (second place)
  - Devyn – 12 hours 39 minutes (third-place)

== Game summary ==
Episode		Challenge type	Winners	Elimination contestants		Elimination game	Elimination outcome	
#	Challenge	Challenge type	Winners	Voted in	Draw pick	Elimination game	Winner	Eliminated
1	Out on a Ledge	Two teams of 14	Team Black	Chet	Frank	Balls In	Frank	Chet
1	Out on a Ledge	Two teams of 14	Team Black	LaToya	Jemmye	Balls In	LaToya	Jemmye
2	Auto Body Rally	Male/female pairs	Cohutta & Laurel	Jonna	Emilee	Wrecking Wall	Jonna	Emilee
2	Auto Body Rally	Male/female pairs	Cohutta & Laurel	Dustin	Frank	Wrecking Wall	Frank	Dustin
3	Bar Crawl	Six teams of 4	Team Brandon	Johnny	—N/a (Note: Johnny was selected for the elimination round in Episode 3, but did not compete. There were four cards in "The Draw", but only three male players were eligible for participation — CT, Jordan and Swift — none of them drew the "kill card". Therefore, by virtue of Frank's illness that resulted in his removal from the competition, no male elimination round was held.)	Looper	—N/a	
3	Bar Crawl	Six teams of 4	Team Brandon	Nia	Cara Maria	Looper	Cara Maria	Nia
4	Bounce Out	Two teams of 11	Team Red	LaToya	Cara Maria	Oppenheimer	Cara Maria	LaToya
4	Bounce Out	Two teams of 11	Team Red	Brandon	Zach	Oppenheimer	Zach	Brandon
5	Piggy Back	Two teams of 10	Team Purple	Laurel	Jasmine	Balls In	Laurel	Jasmine
5	Piggy Back	Two teams of 10	Team Purple	Bananas	Isaac	Balls In	Bananas	Isaac
6	Smarty Pants	Individual	Zach	Swift	Jordan	Looper	Jordan	Swift
6	Smarty Pants	Individual	Devyn	Theresa	Camila	Looper	Theresa	Camila
7	Sausage Party	Individual	Laurel	Aneesa	Jonna	Wrecking Wall	Aneesa	Jonna
7	Sausage Party	Individual	Johnny	Bananas	Jordan (Note: Jordan was the first to flip a card and flipped all 3 cards until he received the kill card as part of his vow to take on Bananas.)	Wrecking Wall	Bananas	Jordan
8	Hold That Pose	Two teams of 7	Team Devyn	Preston	Cohutta	Oppenheimer	Cohutta	Preston
8	Hold That Pose	Two teams of 7	Team Devyn	Aneesa	Laurel	Oppenheimer	Laurel	Aneesa
9	Dug Out	Same-gender pairs	Nany & Theresa	Jessica	Cara Maria	Balls In	Cara Maria	Jessica
9	Dug Out	Same-gender pairs	CT & Zach	Cohutta	Leroy	Balls In	Leroy	Cohutta
10/11	Crossover	Male/female pairs	Bananas & Nany	CT	Leroy	Wrecking Wall	CT	Leroy
10/11	Crossover	Male/female pairs	Bananas & Nany	Cara Maria	Laurel	Wrecking Wall	Laurel	Cara Maria
11	—N/a (Note: In Episode 11, no challenge was held prior to the final draw, and no competitor had immunity from the final draw.)			Laurel vs. Theresa		Puzzle Pyramid	Laurel	Theresa
11	—N/a			Bananas vs. CT		Puzzle Pyramid	Bananas	CT
11/12	Final Challenge	Male/female pairs → Individual	Bananas	2nd place: Johnny; 3rd place: Zach				
11/12	Final Challenge	Male/female pairs → Individual	Laurel	2nd place: Nany; 3rd place: Devyn				

=== Elimination progress ===
Contestants		Episodes											
Contestants		1	2	3	4	5	6	7	8	9	10/11	11	Finale
03	Bananas	WIN	SAFE	WIN	WIN	ELIM	SAFE	ELIM	RISK	RISK	WIN	ELIM	WINNER
24	Laurel	WIN	WIN	SAFE	WIN	ELIM	SAFE	WIN	ELIM	RISK	ELIM	ELIM	WINNER
17	Johnny	WIN	RISK	SAVE	WIN	WIN	RISK	WIN	RISK	RISK	RISK	RISK	SECOND
14	Nany	WIN	SAFE	SAFE	WIN	RISK	RISK	RISK	WIN	WIN	WIN	RISK	SECOND
06	Devyn	WIN	SAFE	SAFE	RISK	WIN	WIN	RISK	WIN	RISK	RISK	RISK	THIRD
23	Zach	RISK	SAFE	SAFE	ELIM	WIN	WIN	SAFE	WIN	WIN	SAFE	RISK	THIRD
01	CT	WIN	RISK	RISK	WIN	RISK	RISK	SAFE	WIN	WIN	ELIM	OUT	
08	Theresa	RISK	RISK	SAFE	WIN	WIN	ELIM	SAFE	RISK	WIN	SAFE	OUT	
02	Cara Maria	RISK	RISK	ELIM	ELIM	WIN	SAFE	SAFE	WIN	ELIM	OUT		
13	Leroy	RISK	SAFE	SAFE	RISK	WIN	RISK	RISK	WIN	ELIM	OUT		
15	Cohutta	WIN	WIN	SAFE	RISK	RISK	SAFE	SAFE	ELIM	OUT			
16	Jessica	WIN	SAFE	WIN	WIN	WIN	RISK	SAFE	WIN	OUT			
10	Aneesa	WIN	SAFE	RISK	RISK	RISK	RISK	ELIM	OUT				
07	Preston	WIN	SAFE	SAFE	WIN	RISK	SAFE	RISK	OUT				
25	Jordan	WIN	SAFE	RISK	WIN	WIN	ELIM	OUT					
20	Jonna	RISK	ELIM	RISK	WIN	WIN	SAFE	OUT					
28	Camila	RISK	SAFE	WIN	RISK	RISK	OUT						
21	Swift	WIN	RISK	RISK	WIN	WIN	OUT						
11	Isaac	RISK	SAFE	SAFE	RISK	OUT							
12	Jasmine	WIN	SAFE	RISK	RISK	OUT							
19	Brandon	RISK	SAFE	WIN	OUT								
18	LaToya	ELIM	SAFE	SAFE	OUT								
26	Nia	WIN	RISK	OUT									
05	Frank	ELIM	ELIM	MED									
27	Dustin	RISK	OUT										
22	Emilee	RISK	OUT										
04	Jemmye	OUT											
09	Chet	QUIT											

Competition
The contestant won the competition
The contestant did not win the final challenge
The contestant won the week's competition, making him/her safe from the elimination round
The contestant did not win the week's competition, but was not selected for the elimination round
The contestant participated in the elimination draw, but did not draw the "kill card"
The contestant was selected for the elimination round, but did not have to compete
The contestant won the elimination round
The contestant won the elimination round by default
The contestant lost the elimination round
The contestant withdrew from the elimination round due to injury
The contestant was removed from the competition due to medical reasons

== Voting progress ==
Voted into Elimination	Chet; 7 of 14 votes	Jonna; 2 of 2 votes	Johnny; 4 of 4 votes	Tie Vote	LaToya; 6 of 11 votes	Laurel; 4 of 10 votes	Swift; 2 of 2 votes	Aneesa; 2 of 2 votes	Preston; 7 of 7 votes	Jessica; 4 of 4 votes	CT; 2 of 2 votes	
Voted into Elimination	LaToya; 11 of 14 votes	Dustin; 2 of 2 votes	Nia; 3 of 4 votes	Brandon; 4 of 11 votes		Bananas; 4 of 10 votes	Theresa; 2 of 2 votes	Bananas; 2 of 2 votes	Aneesa; 7 of 7 votes	Cohutta; 3 of 4 votes	Tie Vote	Cara Maria; 2 of 2 votes
Kill Card	Frank	Emilee	No Draw	Cara Maria		Jasmine	Jordan	Jonna	Cohutta	Cara Maria	Leroy	
Kill Card	Jemmye	Frank	Cara Maria	Zach		Isaac	Camila	Jordan	Laurel	Leroy	Laurel	
Voter	Episodes											
Voter	1	2	3	4		5	6	7	8	9	10/11	
Bananas	LaToya		Nia	LaToya	LaToya						Cara Maria	Cara Maria
Bananas	Chet		Johnny	Brandon							CT	
Laurel	LaToya	Jonna		Aneesa	Aneesa			Aneesa				
Laurel	Chet	Dustin		Isaac				Bananas				
Johnny	LaToya			LaToya	LaToya	Camila		Aneesa				
Johnny	Dustin			Brandon		Bananas		Bananas				
Nany	LaToya			Aneesa	Aneesa				Aneesa	Jessica	Theresa	Cara Maria
Nany	Isaac			Zach					Preston	Johnny	CT	
Zach						Laurel	Theresa		Aneesa	Jessica		
Zach						Bananas	Swift		Preston	Cohutta		
Devyn	Emilee					Laurel	Theresa		Aneesa			
Devyn	Leroy					Cohutta	Swift		Preston			
CT	LaToya			LaToya	LaToya				Aneesa	Jessica		
CT	Dustin			Brandon					Preston	Cohutta		
Theresa				Jasmine	LaToya	Jasmine				Jessica		
Theresa				Isaac		Preston				Cohutta		
Cara Maria						Aneesa			Aneesa			
Cara Maria						Bananas			Preston			
Leroy						Laurel			Aneesa			
Leroy						Isaac			Preston			
Cohutta	LaToya	Jonna										
Cohutta	Chet	Dustin										
Jessica	LaToya		Devyn	Jasmine	Aneesa	Aneesa			Aneesa			
Jessica	Chet		Johnny	Leroy		Isaac			Preston			
Aneesa	LaToya											
Aneesa	Brandon											
Preston	Theresa			Aneesa	Aneesa							
Preston	Frank			Isaac								
Jordan	LaToya			LaToya	LaToya	Nany						
Jordan	Dustin			Leroy		Bananas						
Jonna				Jasmine	LaToya	Laurel						
Jonna				Cohutta		Preston						
Camila			Nia									
Camila			Johnny									
Swift	Emilee			Aneesa	Aneesa	Nany						
Swift	Chet			Brandon		Isaac						
Isaac												
Jasmine	LaToya											
Jasmine	Chet											
Brandon			Nia									
Brandon			Johnny									
LaToya												
Nia	LaToya											
Nia	Chet											
Frank												
Dustin												
Emilee												
Jemmye												
Chet												

== Team selections ==
- **Bold** indicates team captains

Contestants	Episodes												
Contestants	1	2	3	4	5	6	7	8	9	10/11	11/12		
Bananas	Black Team	**Jonna**	Team Brandon	**Red Team**	Yellow Team	Individual	Individual	Team Johnny	Cohutta	**Nany**	Laurel	Devyn	Nany
Laurel	Black Team	Cohutta	Team Leroy	Red Team	Yellow Team	Individual	Individual	Team Johnny	Devyn	**Leroy**	Bananas	Johnny	Zach
Johnny	Black Team	Cara Maria	Team Zach	Red Team	**Purple Team**	Individual	Individual	**Team Johnny**	**Leroy**	**Devyn**	Nany	Laurel	Devyn
Nany	Black Team	**Dustin**	Team LaToya	Red Team	Yellow Team	Individual	Individual	Team Devyn	Theresa	Bananas	Johnny	Zach	Bananas
Devyn	Black Team	Isaac	Team Zach	Yellow Team	Purple Team	Individual	Individual	**Team Devyn**	**Laurel**	Johnny	Zach	Bananas	Johnny
Zach	Red Team	Aneesa	**Team Zach**	Yellow Team	Purple Team	Individual	Individual	Team Devyn	CT	Theresa	Devyn	Nany	Laurel
CT	Black Team	Emilee	Team Cara Maria	Red Team	Yellow Team	Individual	Individual	Team Devyn	**Zach**	Cara Maria			
Theresa	Red Team	Swift	Team Zach	Red Team	Purple Team	Individual	Individual	Team Johnny	**Nany**	**Zach**			
Cara Maria	Red Team	**Johnny**	**Team Cara Maria**	**Yellow Team**	Purple Team	Individual	Individual	Team Devyn	**Jessica**	**CT**			
Leroy	Red Team	**Jessica**	**Team Leroy**	Yellow Team	Purple Team	Individual	Individual	Team Devyn	Johnny	Laurel			
Cohutta	Black Team	**Laurel**	Team LaToya	Yellow Team	Yellow Team	Individual	Individual	Team Johnny	**Bananas**				
Jessica	Black Team	Leroy	Team Brandon	Red Team	Purple Team	Individual	Individual	Team Devyn	Cara Maria				
Aneesa	Black Team	**Zach**	Team Cara Maria	Yellow Team	Yellow Team	Individual	Individual	Team Johnny					
Preston	Black Team	Camila	Team LaToya	Red Team	Yellow Team	Individual	Individual	Team Johnny					
Jordan	Black Team	Jasmine	Team Jasmine	Red Team	Purple Team	Individual	Individual						
Jonna	Red Team	Bananas	Team Jasmine	Red Team	Purple Team	Individual	Individual						
Camila	Red Team	**Preston**	Team Brandon	Yellow Team	**Yellow Team**	Individual							
Swift	Black Team	**Theresa**	Team Cara Maria	Red Team	Purple Team	Individual							
Isaac	Red Team	**Devyn**	Team Leroy	Yellow Team	Yellow Team								
Jasmine	Black Team	**Jordan**	**Team Jasmine**	Yellow Team	Yellow Team								
Brandon	Red Team	**LaToya**	**Team Brandon**	Yellow Team									
LaToya	Red Team	Brandon	**Team LaToya**	Yellow Team									
Nia	**Black Team**	Frank	Team Leroy										
Frank	Red Team	**Nia**											
Dustin	Red Team	Nany											
Emilee	Red Team	**CT**											
Jemmye	Red Team												
Chet	**Red Team**												

== Episodes ==
No. overall	No. in season	Title	Original release date	US viewers (millions)
305	1	"Live Free or Die"	April 10, 2014	0.95
306	2	"Love in the Fast Lane"	April 17, 2014	0.92
307	3	"You Be Illin'"	April 24, 2014	0.93
308	4	"Inadequate"	May 1, 2014	1.11
309	5	"Stripes"	May 8, 2014	0.97
310	6	"Not So Trivial Pursuits"	May 15, 2014	1.07
311	7	"Pride Before The Wall"	May 22, 2014	1.14
312	8	"Strike a Pose, There's Something to It"	May 29, 2014	1.08
313	9	"Best Friends for Never"	June 5, 2014	1.06
314	10	"Talk to the Hand"	June 12, 2014	1.14
315	11	"The $350,000 Pyramid"	June 19, 2014	1.01
316	12	"A Walk in the Clouds"	June 26, 2014	1.15

=== Reunion special ===
The Reunion special aired on June 26, 2014, after the season finale and was hosted by Jonny Moseley. The cast members who attended the reunion were Johnny Bananas, Laurel, Johnny, Nany, Zach, Devyn, CT, Theresa, Cara Maria, Cohutta, Jessica and Jordan.
