= The Challenge: Battle of the Seasons =

23rd season of the reality television series

Coordinates: 37°07′18.3″N 27°19′41.4″E

Battle of the Seasons
- Season 23
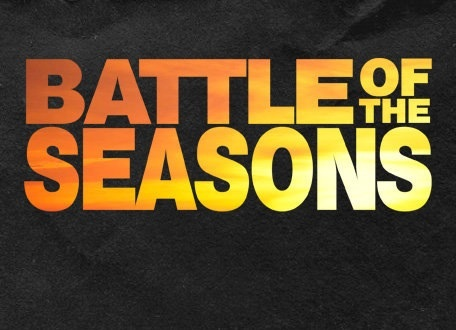
- Presented by: T. J. Lavin
- No. of contestants: 32
- Winners: Ashley Kelsey; Frank Sweeney; Sam McGinn; Zach Nichols
- Location: Bodrum, Turkey; Swakopmund & Windhoek, Namibia
- No. of episodes: 13 (Reunion Included)

Release
- Original network: MTV
- Original release: September 19 – December 19, 2012

Season chronology
- ← Previous; Battle of the Exes Next → Rivals II

The Challenge: Battle of the Seasons is the 23rd season of the MTV reality game show, The Challenge. The season took place in Bodrum, Turkey and Swakopmund & Windhoek, Namibia, and featured cast members from select seasons of The Real World and The Challenge competing for the $250,000 grand prize.

The season premiered with a special 90 minutes episode on September 19, 2012, and concluded its run on December 19, 2012, with the reunion special.

== Format ==
During each Challenge, teams compete in order to become the Power Team, who have the ability to place one team of their decision into the Arena. The other couple going into the Arena is the last placing team of the daily Challenge. Once in the Arena, a team must decide one male-female pair to compete. The losing pair in the Arena go home, and leave their team short two players. Teams can compete with only two players, and have potential to make a greater share of the final's $250,000.

First place wins $250,000, second-place wins $50,000 and third-place wins $40,000.

== Contestants ==
Male contestants	Original season	Finish
Frank Sweeney	The Real World: San Diego (2011)	Winner
Zach Nichols	The Real World: San Diego (2011)	Winner
Dustin Zito	The Real World: Las Vegas (2011)	Runner-up
Chet Cannon	The Real World: Brooklyn	Third place
JD Ordoñez	The Real World: Brooklyn	Third place
Derek Chavez	The Real World: Cancun	Episode 11
Robb Schreiber	The Real World: St. Thomas	Episode 10
Alton Williams	The Real World: Las Vegas (2002)	Episode 9
CJ Koegel	The Real World: Cancun	Episode 8
Ryan Knight	The Real World: New Orleans (2010)	Episode 7
Trey Weatherholtz	The Real World: St. Thomas	Episode 6
Preston Charles	The Real World: New Orleans (2010)	Episode 5
Eric Banks	Real World/Road Rules Challenge: Fresh Meat	Episode 5 (Note: During the "Water Torture" Arena at the beginning of Episode 5, Eric grew frustrated and quit when he determined that his weight prevented him from competing in the Arena, despite being in the lead. As a result, Team Fresh Meat was disqualified, and Team Brooklyn was declared the winner by default.)
Brandon Nelson	The Challenge: Fresh Meat II	Episode 3
Danny Jamieson	The Real World: Austin	Episode 2
Wes Bergmann	The Real World: Austin	Episode 1

Female contestants	Original season	Finish
Ashley Kelsey	The Real World: San Diego (2011)	Winner
Sam McGinn	The Real World: San Diego (2011)	Winner
Trishelle Cannatella	The Real World: Las Vegas (2002)	Runner-up
Devyn Simone	The Real World: Brooklyn	Third place
Sarah Rice	The Real World: Brooklyn	Third place
Jonna Mannion	The Real World: Cancun	Episode 11
Marie Roda	The Real World: St. Thomas	Episode 10
Nany González	The Real World: Las Vegas (2011)	Episode 9
Jasmine Reynaud	The Real World: Cancun	Episode 8
Jemmye Carroll	The Real World: New Orleans (2010)	Episode 7
Laura Waller	The Real World: St. Thomas	Episode 6
McKenzie Coburn	The Real World: New Orleans (2010)	Episode 5
Camila Nakagawa	Spring Break Challenge	Episode 5
Cara Maria Sorbello	The Challenge: Fresh Meat II	Episode 3
Melinda Stolp	The Real World: Austin	Episode 2
Lacey Buehler	The Real World: Austin	Episode 1

=== Teams ===
8 teams of 4 competed in this season of The Challenge. Most teams were formed from Housemates from the same season of The Real World. In a minor twist, the Las Vegas team was composed of two Housemates each from the two Las Vegas-based seasons of The Real World. Additionally (due to the pre-production disqualification of a Real World: Sydney team (Note: KellyAnne Judd, Dunbar Merrill, Ashli Robson, and Isaac Stout from The Real World: Sydney were originally cast, and flew out to Turkey to participate. However, they were removed prior to the start of the first challenge. The producers claimed that Stout did not pass his medical test, and they were replaced by the Fresh Meat team. Stout claims his doctor has told him that they have no idea how the producer claimed that and that Stout was in good health.)), an 8th team consisted solely of Fresh Meat (contestants who debuted on The Challenge) was introduced at the First Challenge.

Team Austin	Team Brooklyn	Team Cancun	Team Fresh Meat	Team Las Vegas	Team New Orleans	Team San Diego	Team St. Thomas
Danny	Chet	CJ	Brandon	Alton	Jemmye	Ashley	Laura
Lacey	Devyn	Derek	Camila	Dustin	Knight	Frank	Marie
Melinda	JD	Jasmine	Cara Maria	Nany	McKenzie	Sam	Robb
Wes	Sarah	Jonna	Eric	Trishelle	Preston	Zach	Trey

== Gameplay ==
=== Challenge games ===
- Don't Cross Me: There are four giant beams shaped like two crosses suspended 25 feet above the water, with ladders coming down from the edges. The object is to cross the beams, meet at the center, then climb back down the ladders until all team members reach the markers. If one player falls off the ladder or the beams, that player, along with their teammate on the other side, has to start over at the bottom of the ladder. The team that crosses the beams and climbs down the ladders in the fastest time becomes the power team, while the team with the slowest time is automatically sent to the Arena.
  - Winner: Team Cancun
- Oil Change: Players from two opposing teams have to wrestle each other out of a square pit filled with olive oil, alternating between male and female. A team wins if one player from the opposing team makes contact with a boundary surrounding the pit. The player that wins the wrestling match collects one of four puzzle pieces needed to complete their team icon, and gets to choose the match for the next round. If nobody wins a match within a 10-minute time limit, the match ends in a draw with no puzzle pieces earned. The first team to collect four puzzle pieces becomes the power team; however, the challenge continues until the last team that fails to collect all of their puzzle pieces is automatically sent to the Arena.
  - Winner: Team San Diego
- Hook, Line & Sinker: A platform is suspended from a structure 30 feet above water, and teams have to advance from one side of the platform to the other using metal hooks and foot holds. A team is disqualified if one player falls into the water or does not make it to the end within a 10-minute time limit. The team that makes it to the end of the platform in the fastest time becomes the new power team, while the team with the slowest time is automatically sent to the Arena.
  - Winner: Team Las Vegas
- Don't Weigh Me Down: Teams have to hold up a large basket attached to a rope from a platform. Each team is split in half — one half of the team is standing atop their designated platform holding up their basket, while the other half runs to a rockpile, and deposits heavy rocks in their opponents' baskets. The players atop the platform have to keep their baskets from touching the ground for as long as possible, while opposing players try to "weigh down" their opponents' baskets with the heavy rocks. The team whose basket touches the ground first is automatically sent to the Arena, while the last team to keep their basket full of rocks from touching ground level wins Power Team.
  - Winner: Team Cancun
- Chairman of the Board: One member of each team sits on a chair on a platform suspended 30 feet above water. Contestants are asked trivia questions on categories like sports, U.S. currency, previous Challenges, The Real World seasons, and spelling. At the end of each round, if a player has fallen and still has teammates left, another team member may take their place on the platform. The first team to lose all members is automatically sent to the Arena, while the last team with a player on the platform wins power team. (Note: Trishelle did not participate in this challenge due to dehydration, leaving Team Las Vegas with one less team member.)
  - Winner: Team San Diego
- Insane Games: This challenge consists of a series of games: "Chariot Race," "Egg Drop," "Ear Pull," a Winner's Playoff and "Fish Head." The team that finishes last in the first two games will compete in a loser's bracket at the end in order to avoid the Arena.
  - "Chariot Race": One guy from each team has to act as a "horse," and pull a sled with his teammates inside the sled. The player pulling the sled has to wear a horse mask, which will make it hard to see, and will require communication from the entire team. Last-place finisher: Team Brooklyn.
  - "Egg Drop": One guy and one girl from each team is chosen to toss eggs over a 10-foot wall. One player on the other side of the wall wears a collar around his/her head (shaped like an oversize funnel), and has to catch the egg in their collar. The first team to catch six eggs in their collar wins. Last-place finisher: Team St. Thomas.
  - "Ear Pull": One player per team sits on a pair of logs, and has to pull a two-foot string from their opponent's ear by only using their own ears and faces. The game in played in same-gender rounds, in a best 2 out of 3. The top two teams advance to a playoff round for a chance to win Power Team. Top two finishers: Team Las Vegas and Team New Orleans.
  - Winner's playoff: Teams Las Vegas and New Orleans compete in a jousting race. Teams approach each other in opposite directions on a track, with a wooden rail in the middle. The riders in the chariot have to knock their opponent off their chariot. The first team to do so wins Power Team.
  - Loser's round - "Fish Head": One player from each team has to knock their opponent off a platform, using a 15-pound fish. The game is played in same-gender rounds. If teams are tied after the first two rounds, a sudden-death round is played, in which T. J. Lavin flips a coin to determine which gender will compete. The losing team is automatically sent to the Arena. Losing team: Team St. Thomas.
    - Winner: Team New Orleans
- Logged Out: Each team has to solve a simple memory game while hiking up a tall mountain. Each team starts at the foot of the mountain, where the first station shows the 9 pieces that solve the puzzle. They then must hike up to the second station, where there are 13 logs with pictures of the pieces; each team must carry the logs to the top of the mountain and reassemble them in the right position. Everyone must stay together at all times. The first team to get the puzzle right wins Power Team, while the team that fails to complete their puzzle is automatically sent to the Arena.
  - Winner: Team Brooklyn
- Hunger Games: Food items are presented to the contestants. Each team writes an estimation of how much of that food item they can eat; the team with the highest estimation is then required to eat said item. If the team fails to reach the quantity they declared, they move onto the losers' round. If the team succeeds, they choose another team to enter the losers' round, and their team advances to the winners' round. A team is disqualified if any team member vomits. The two losing teams compete head-to-head to each as much food as possible within two minutes to decide the losing team. The two winning teams compete head-to-head to each as much food as possible within two minutes to decide the new Power Team, while the team who loses the losers' round is automatically sent to the Arena.
  - Winner: Team Brooklyn
- Abandon Ship: Teams have to race a life raft from a ship to the shore. First, at least one player has to pull off three buoys from a line resting 25, 20 and 15 feet below the surface of the life raft buoy, which is five feet below the water. After the last buoy is pulled, the life raft immediately inflates above the water, and each team races in their life raft to the shore. A team is given a five-minute penalty is a player does not pull off a buoy before a teammate jumps off the ship into the water. The team that advances their life raft to the shore in the fastest time wins Power Team, while the team with the slowest time is automatically sent to the Arena.
  - Winner: Team San Diego
- Force Field: Teams have to push each other off a platform that is placed in the center of a mud pit, by using large, inflatable inner tubes. The challenge is played in two different rounds — one for each gender, as well as with a point system, ranging from zero to 80 points. A team is disqualified if they fall down within the platform three times. The first team to be knocked off the platform (during a gender-designated round) will get zero points, while the second, third and fourth teams knocked off receive 20, 40 and 60 points, respectively. The last team standing gets 80 points and wins the round for their team. The same process continues in the second gender-designated round until the team that accumulates the most points in both rounds becomes the new Power Team, while the team that accumulates the fewest combined points is automatically sent to the Arena.
  - Winner: Team San Diego
- Sling Shot: One player from each team is towed on a launch ramp from a four-wheeler that is driven by their teammate. Once that player is launched into the water, he/she has to swim to a dock in the middle of a lake, ring a bell, then swim back to the shore. Teams with four players will have two timings merged into one. The team with the fastest average time not only becomes the new Power Team, but is also guaranteed a spot in the finals, while the team with the slowest time is automatically sent to the Arena.
  - Winner: Team Las Vegas

=== Arena games ===
There are four games in the Arena: Physical, Mental, Strategy, and Endurance. This game is selected by the Power Team after they reveal their choice to go into the Arena. However, the same game cannot be used more than once until each of the other games have been used.

- Hall Brawl (Physical): Played in same-gender rounds, players must run through a narrow hallway past another contestant to ring a bell. The players who ring the bell first in the best two out of three rounds, wins the elimination.
  - Played by: Cara Maria & Eric vs. Lacey & Wes and Sam & Zach vs. CJ & Jasmine
- Balls Out (Endurance): Players have to slide 25 silver balls over a wall towards their opponents side of the field. The players with the fewest balls on their field wins the elimination.
  - Played by: Danny & Melinda vs. Camila & Eric, McKenzie & Preston vs. Chet & Sarah, and Robb & Marie vs. Alton & Nany
- Knot So Fast (Strategy): Players have 10 minutes to create as many knots using feet of rope within a dome-shaped structure. After those 10 minutes are up, players must untie their opponents' knots. The players who untie the other team's knots first wins the elimination.
  - Played by: Brandon & Cara Maria vs. Chet & Sarah, Laura & Trey vs. Dustin & Nany and Ashley & Frank vs. Derek & Jonna
- Water Torture (Mental): The guys are hanging from a rope system connected to their female partner by their ankles. The object is for the guys to submerge themselves into a water tank and hold their breath for as long as possible, which pulls the girls up the rope allowing them to solve a memory game. The first team to complete their puzzle wins the elimination.
  - Played by: Devyn & JD vs. Eric & Camila, Jemmye & Knight vs. Sam & Zach, and Dustin & Trishelle vs. Robb & Marie

=== Final challenge ===
The first phase of the final challenge begins with players from each team parachuting from a plane to ground level on the Namibian desert. Each team then sprints through the desert to their first checkpoint, "Mind Field," in which each team has a 20-minute time limit to align nine numbers on a 3x3 grid to where each number equals 15 in each direction. After a team has correctly aligned the numbers, they can push a red button, which will detonate the designated "mine field" and enable a team to hop aboard a helicopter, which will take them over the mountains to the next checkpoint, "Rung Out." Players from each team must swing a ring roped to a hook toward a pole until one player successfully hooks the ring to the pole. If a player misses, he/she has to take a drink of warm camel milk. The next checkpoint is "Get Tired," in which each team must use multiple poles and ropes in order to carry a series of tires through the desert — for the four-player teams, it is eight tires; for the only two-player team, it is four tires. A helicopter takes each team to the last checkpoint of the first phase, "Camel Nap," in which all but one player from each team must stand within a small designated rectangle in the sand, and supervise a camel overnight in a tent, while one team member gets to sleep by a nearby campfire. A team is assessed a one-minute penalty to begin the second phase of the final challenge if one team member steps out of the rectangle for any reason while supervising the camel. The first team to arrive the "Camel Nap" checkpoint earns a 10-minute headstart, the second-place team earns a five-minute headstart, while the third-place team does not earn a headstart. After racing through numerous sand dunes, the first checkpoint of the second phase is "Hallucination Station," in which each team must locate words from a large chart from a distance of 15 feet in order to match an answer key needed to unlock wooden crates that each team will use at the "Sand Shift" checkpoint, in which each team must use the crates to transfer sand into their designated containers several feet away. Once the containers have been filled with sand, the final section is a race to the top of a sand dune, with a flag at the end, in which the first-place team wins $250,000, the second-place team wins $50,000, and the third-place team wins $40,000.

- Winner: Team San Diego

== Game summary ==
Episode		Winners	Arena contestants				Arena game	Arena outcome	
#	Challenge	Winners	Last-place	Winners' pick	Last-place pair	Selected pair	Arena game	Winners	Eliminated
1	Don't Cross Me	Team Cancun	Team Fresh Meat	Team Austin	Cara Maria & Eric	Lacey & Wes	Hall Brawl	Cara Maria & Eric	Lacey & Wes
2	Oil Change	Team San Diego	Team Austin	Team Fresh Meat	Danny & Melinda	Camila & Eric (Note: As the Nominated team was unable to choose two of their own players to enter the Arena, the Power Team in each episode chose for them.)	Balls Out	Camila & Eric	Danny & Melinda
3	Hook, Line & Sinker	Team Las Vegas	Team Fresh Meat	Team Brooklyn	Brandon & Cara Maria	Chet & Sarah	Knot So Fast	Chet & Sarah	Brandon & Cara Maria
4/5	Don't Weigh Me Down	Team Cancun	Team Brooklyn	Team Fresh Meat	Devyn & JD	Camila & Eric	Water Torture	Devyn & JD	Camila & Eric
5	Chairman of the Board	Team San Diego	Team New Orleans	Team Brooklyn	McKenzie & Preston	Chet & Sarah	Balls Out	Chet & Sarah	McKenzie & Preston
6	Insane Games	Team New Orleans	Team St. Thomas	Team Las Vegas	Laura & Trey	Dustin & Nany	Knot So Fast	Dustin & Nany	Laura & Trey
7	Logged Out	Team Brooklyn	Team New Orleans	Team San Diego	Jemmye & Knight	Sam & Zach	Water Torture	Sam & Zach	Jemmye & Knight
8	Hunger Games	Team Brooklyn	Team San Diego	Team Cancun	Sam & Zach	CJ & Jasmine	Hall Brawl	Sam & Zach	CJ & Jasmine
9	Abandon Ship	Team San Diego	Team St. Thomas	Team Las Vegas	Marie & Robb	Alton & Nany	Balls Out	Marie & Robb	Alton & Nany
10	Force Field	Team San Diego	Team Las Vegas	Team St. Thomas	Dustin & Trishelle	Marie & Robb	Water Torture	Dustin & Trishelle	Marie & Robb
11	Sling Shot	Team Las Vegas	Team Cancun	Team San Diego	Derek & Jonna	Ashley & Frank	Knot So Fast	Ashley & Frank	Derek & Jonna
12	Final Challenge	Team San Diego	2nd place: Team Las Vegas; 3rd place: Team Brooklyn						

=== Elimination progress ===
Contestants	Episode											
Contestants	1	2	3	4/5	5	6	7	8	9	10	11	Finale
Ashley	SAFE	WIN	SAFE	SAFE	WIN	SAFE	RISK	RISK	WIN	WIN	ELIM	WINNER
Frank	SAFE	WIN	SAFE	SAFE	WIN	SAFE	RISK	RISK	WIN	WIN	ELIM	WINNER
Sam	SAFE	WIN	SAFE	SAFE	WIN	SAFE	ELIM	ELIM	WIN	WIN	RISK	WINNER
Zach	SAFE	WIN	SAFE	SAFE	WIN	SAFE	ELIM	ELIM	WIN	WIN	RISK	WINNER
Dustin	SAFE	SAFE	WIN	SAFE	SAFE	ELIM	SAFE	SAFE	RISK	ELIM	WIN	SECOND
Trishelle	SAFE	SAFE	WIN	SAFE	SAFE	RISK	SAFE	SAFE	RISK	ELIM	WIN	SECOND
Chet	SAFE	SAFE	ELIM	RISK	ELIM	SAFE	WIN	WIN	SAFE	SAFE	SAFE	THIRD
Devyn	SAFE	SAFE	RISK	ELIM	RISK	SAFE	WIN	WIN	SAFE	SAFE	SAFE	THIRD
JD	SAFE	SAFE	RISK	ELIM	RISK	SAFE	WIN	WIN	SAFE	SAFE	SAFE	THIRD
Sarah	SAFE	SAFE	ELIM	RISK	ELIM	SAFE	WIN	WIN	SAFE	SAFE	SAFE	THIRD
Derek	WIN	SAFE	SAFE	WIN	SAFE	SAFE	SAFE	RISK	SAFE	SAFE	OUT	
Jonna	WIN	SAFE	SAFE	WIN	SAFE	SAFE	SAFE	RISK	SAFE	SAFE	OUT	
Marie	SAFE	SAFE	SAFE	SAFE	SAFE	RISK	SAFE	SAFE	ELIM	OUT		
Robb	SAFE	SAFE	SAFE	SAFE	SAFE	RISK	SAFE	SAFE	ELIM	OUT		
Alton	SAFE	SAFE	WIN	SAFE	SAFE	RISK	SAFE	SAFE	OUT			
Nany	SAFE	SAFE	WIN	SAFE	SAFE	ELIM	SAFE	SAFE	OUT			
CJ	WIN	SAFE	SAFE	WIN	SAFE	SAFE	SAFE	OUT				
Jasmine	WIN	SAFE	SAFE	WIN	SAFE	SAFE	SAFE	OUT				
Jemmye	SAFE	SAFE	SAFE	SAFE	RISK	WIN	OUT					
Knight	SAFE	SAFE	SAFE	SAFE	RISK	WIN	OUT					
Laura	SAFE	SAFE	SAFE	SAFE	SAFE	OUT						
Trey	SAFE	SAFE	SAFE	SAFE	SAFE	OUT						
McKenzie	SAFE	SAFE	SAFE	SAFE	OUT							
Preston	SAFE	SAFE	SAFE	SAFE	OUT							
Camila	RISK	ELIM	RISK	DQ								
Eric	ELIM	ELIM	RISK	QUIT								
Brandon	RISK	RISK	OUT									
Cara Maria	ELIM	RISK	OUT									
Danny	RISK	OUT										
Melinda	RISK	OUT										
Lacey	OUT											
Wes	OUT											

Competition
The contestant's team won the final challenge
The contestant's team did not win the final challenge
The contestant was a part of the Power Team, was safe from the Arena, and selected a team to compete in the Arena
The contestant's team was not selected to go into the Arena
The contestant's team was nominated for the Arena, but was not selected to compete
The contestant won in the Arena
The contestant was eliminated in the Arena
The contestant withdrew from the Arena
The contestant was forced to leave the competition after their partner quit from the Arena

== Episodes ==
No. overall	No. in season	Title	Original release date	US viewers (millions)
281	1	"Tis the Season"	September 19, 2012	1.15
282	2	"The Perks of Being a Rookie"	September 26, 2012	1.23
283	3	"What Happens in Vegas..."	October 3, 2012	1.11
284	4	"The Dark Knight"	October 10, 2012	1.06
285	5	"N-A-R-C-I-S-S-I-S-T-I-C"	October 17, 2012	0.91
286	6	"Going Insane"	October 24, 2012	1.16
287	7	"I Do Not Like You Sam I Am"	November 7, 2012	1.10
288	8	"Honey, I'm Homeless"	November 14, 2012	1.07
289	9	"The Chronicles of Nanyia"	November 28, 2012	1.34
290	10	"A Woman Scorned"	December 5, 2012	0.98
291	11	"I Like to Move it, Move it"	December 12, 2012	0.96
292	12	"Operation Desert Scorn"	December 19, 2012	1.01

=== Reunion special ===
The Challenge: Battle of the Seasons Reunion was aired on December 19, 2012, after the season finale. The episode featured Jonny Moseley, one of previous sporadic presenters of the series, who had not previously appeared on The Challenge since its 9th season. The cast members who attended the reunion were: Ashley, Frank, Sam, Zach, Alton, Dustin, Nany, Trishelle, Chet, Devyn, JD, Sarah, Derek, Jonna, Marie & Robb.
