= The Challenge: Rivals II =

24th season of the reality television series

Rivals II
- Season 24
- Presented by: T. J. Lavin
- No. of contestants: 33
- Winners: Chris "CT" Tamburello; Wes Bergmann; Emily Schromm; Paula Meronek
- Location: Phuket, Thailand
- No. of episodes: 15 (Reunion and 2 Specials included)

Release
- Original network: MTV
- Original release: July 10 – September 25, 2013

Season chronology
- ← Previous; Battle of the Seasons Next → Free Agents

The Challenge: Rivals II is the 24th season of the MTV reality game show The Challenge. The season took place in Phuket, Thailand, with former cast members from The Real World and The Challenge competing.

A launch special, "ChallengeMania: the Road to Rivals II," aired on June 26, 2013. The season premiered with a special 90 minutes episode on July 10, 2013, and concluded its run on September 25, 2013, with the live Reunion special.

This is the second of the Rivals series, with the original Rivals airing in 2011 and Rivals III following in 2016.

== Format ==
Rivals II follows the same format as the original Rivals challenge, with the following differences:

- After each challenge, the winning team whose gender is not designated for the Jungle is awarded $1,000.
- Unlike the original Rivals, the nominations process is only determined by the teams of the other gender - so only the male teams vote in for female nominations, and vice versa. The teams are not told this until after the first vote.
- At the end of the season, six teams compete in the final challenge — three of each gender — for a share of a $350,000 prize. The first-place male and female teams win $125,000, second-place wins $35,000 and third-place wins $15,000.

== Contestants ==
Male contestants	Original season	Finish
Chris "CT" Tamburello	The Real World: Paris	Winner
Wes Bergmann	The Real World: Austin	Winner
Frank Sweeney	The Real World: San Diego (2011)	Runner-up
Johnny Devenanzio	The Real World: Key West	Runner-up
Jordan Wiseley	The Real World: Portland	Third place
Marlon Williams	The Real World: Portland	Third place
Preston Charles	The Real World: New Orleans (2010)	Episode 9
Ryan Knight	The Real World: New Orleans (2010)	Episode 9
Leroy Garrett	The Real World: Las Vegas (2011)	Episode 7
Ty Ruff	The Real World: D.C.	Episode 7
Trey Weatherholtz	The Real World: St. Thomas	Episode 5 (Note: Trey & Zach finished the "Breaking on Through" Jungle before Leroy & Ty, but were disqualified for failing to alternate breaking through each floor.)
Zach Nichols	The Real World: San Diego (2011)	Episode 5
Derek Chavez	The Real World: Cancun	Episode 3
Robb Schreiber	The Real World: St. Thomas	Episode 3
Dunbar Merrill	The Real World: Sydney	Episode 1
Tyrie Ballard	The Real World: Denver	Episode 1

Female contestants	Original season	Finish
Emily Schromm	The Real World: D.C.	Winner
Paula Meronek	The Real World: Key West	Winner
Cara Maria Sorbello (Note: Cooke's original partner, Naomi, withdrew from the game prior to the first Jungle due to a family emergency back home. Cara Maria was brought in as Cooke's replacement partner prior to the "XXX Games" challenge in Episode 2.)	The Challenge: Fresh Meat II	Runner-up
Heather Cooke	The Real World: Las Vegas (2011)	Runner-up
Camila Nakagawa	Spring Break Challenge	Third place
Jemmye Carroll	The Real World: New Orleans (2010)	Third place
Aneesa Ferreira	The Real World: Chicago	Episode 11
Diem Brown	Real World/Road Rules Challenge: Fresh Meat	Episode 11
Jonna Mannion	The Real World: Cancun	Episode 8
Nany González	The Real World: Las Vegas (2011)	Episode 8
Jasmine Reynaud	The Real World: Cancun	Episode 6
Theresa Gonzalez	The Challenge: Fresh Meat II	Episode 6
Sarah Rice	The Real World: Brooklyn	Episode 3 (Note: Prior to the "Mind Over Splatter" challenge in Episode 3, Trishelle quit the game. Sarah was sent home because she was left without a partner.)
Trishelle Cannatella	The Real World: Las Vegas (2002)	Episode 3
Anastasia Miller	The Real World: Portland	Episode 2
Jessica McCain	The Real World: Portland	Episode 2
Naomi Defensor	The Real World: Las Vegas (2011)	Episode 1

=== Teams ===
Team	Partner 1	Partner 2
Anastasia & Jessica	Anastasia Miller	Jessica McCain
Aneesa & Diem	Aneesa Ferreira	Diem Brown
Camila & Jemmye	Camila Nakagawa	Jemmye Carroll
Cara Maria & Cooke	Cara Maria Sorbello	Heather Cooke
Cooke & Naomi	Heather Cooke	Naomi Defensor
CT & Wes	Chris "CT" Tamburello	Wes Bergmann
Derek & Robb	Derek Chavez	Robb Schreiber
Dunbar & Tyrie	Dunbar Merrill	Tyrie Ballard
Emily & Paula	Emily Schromm	Paula Meronek
Frank & Johnny	Frank Sweeney	Johnny Devenanzio
Jasmine & Theresa	Jasmine Reynaud	Theresa González
Jonna & Nany	Jonna Mannion	Nany González
Jordan & Marlon	Jordan Wiseley	Marlon Williams
Knight & Preston	Ryan Knight	Preston Roberson-Charles
Leroy & Ty	Leroy Garrett	Ty Ruff
Sarah & Trishelle	Sarah Rice	Trishelle Cannatella
Trey & Zach	Trey Weatherholtz	Zach Nichols

=== Pre-season rivalry backgrounds ===
==== Male teams ====
- CT & Wes: Their rivalry started on The Duel, where Wes and Evan Starkman plotted to take out CT, but the plan backfired when CT defeated Evan in the elimination round. Tension continued to rise after CT was disqualified in the "Push Me" Duel against Brad Fiorenza. After CT exploded calling the decision unfair, Wes stepped in and a heated argument ensued. During the argument, CT told Wes to "tell your girlfriend [Johanna Botta] you have to put the ring on layaway" to which Wes responded, "Why don't I fake date someone just to get to the end of this shit," referring to CT's new relationship with Diem Brown. On Rivals Wes tried to start drama and CT verbally attacked Wes while Wes did not respond. While the two were not shown fighting on Battle of the Exes, CT informed Johnny that Wes was trying to bully his partner, Camila, resulting in Johnny sending Wes and Mandi into the first Dome against Nate and Priscilla.
- Derek & Robb: On Battle of the Seasons, Robb and his then-girlfriend Marie Roda were upset about getting sent into the Arena against Team Las Vegas. After Marie began insulting JD Ordoñez, Derek stepped up to defend him. Robb then stepped up to defend Marie and him and Derek got into a physical argument, which resulted in Derek getting shoved by Marie.
- Dunbar & Tyrie: The two had a one-sided beef on The Island, where Tyrie made several comments about Dunbar not being worthy of having a key after being given it by Abram Boise. Tyrie also became annoyed by Dunbar's behavior over food distribution on The Island. Upon finding out his partner, Dunbar stated that he never knew Tyrie disliked him.
- Frank & Johnny: While the two had never met, they exchanged several tweets to each other after Johnny ranted online about not getting cast in Battle of the Seasons.
- Jordan & Marlon: The two started as friends on The Real World: Portland, but Jordan's drunken antics caused Marlon to become frustrated with him and the two got into an argument after Jordan made a racist gesture towards African-American castmate Nia Moore.
- Knight & Preston: On The Real World: New Orleans, Knight made some homophobic remarks about Preston, which greatly offended him. The two were then teammates on Battle of the Seasons, where they both expressed their distaste for each other. Shortly after moving into the house, Knight and ex-girlfriend Jemmye Carroll began talking about getting Preston and McKenzie Coburn off of their team, feeling that the pair was holding them back.
- Leroy & Ty: The two ended up grappling the other during the original Rivals that led to Leroy's teammate Adam Royer being disqualified for punching Ty. In addition, Ty and his partner Emily Schromm faced-off and defeated Leroy and his partner Naomi in the Dome on Battle of the Exes.
- Trey & Zach: During Battle of the Seasons, Trey felt excluded by Zach's Team and their alliance. Trey did not like the fact that Marie was the "decision maker" for their team, and that he and Laura Waller were seen as the outcasts. The one time the entire Team St. Thomas spoke with Team San Diego, Zach became frustrated with Trey while discussing why they should not put them in the elimination. After Trey stated that he was playing the game his way, Zach got up and walked away.

==== Female teams ====
- Anastasia & Jessica: On The Real World: Portland the two started out friendly with each other, but then eventually began to become annoyed with each other after Jessica felt excluded by Anastasia and their fellow castmate Averey Tressler, as well as Anastasia becoming annoyed with what she felt was Jessica's need to constantly draw attention to herself. Anastasia admitted in a confessional that she was extremely annoyed with Jessica's controlling behavior and wanted to get away from her, and later sat down with Jessica to express her dislike of her. However, during a physical altercation between roommates Averey Tressler, Johnny Reilly and Nia Moore, Anastasia and Jessica squashed their differences.
- Aneesa & Diem: During the second to last challenge on The Duel, Aneesa told Diem that she would not call her into the Duel (under the false assumption that Diem would win that day's safety). After Jodi Weatherton won the challenge, Aneesa was left to decide between Diem, and her friend Svetlana Shusterman. Aneesa chose Diem and the pair would face off in the elimination round, where Diem was eliminated in tears.
- Camila & Jemmye: Following the altercations between Ryan Knight and Nany González on Battle of the Seasons, Camila got into an argument with Knight for defending Nany. Jemmye quickly came to his aid and excoriated Camila to the point where the two almost got physical with one another.
- Cooke & Naomi: Following Adam Royer's eviction form the Hard Rock Hotel and Casino on The Real World: Las Vegas, Cooke filled his spot in the cast. Naomi was the main cast member trying to band everyone against Cooke, leading to the latter to becoming an outcast for the majority of her stay in Las Vegas. Eventually Cooke had set her sights on Naomi's on-off bedmate Leroy Garrett, leading to an argument where Naomi got in Cooke's face.
  - Cara Maria & Cooke: Cara Maria replaces Naomi in episode 2. Although they have never appeared on a season together, Cooke mentioned Cara Maria tweeting "not-so-nice" things to Cooke.
- Emily & Paula: The two faced off against each other in an elimination round on Cutthroat, where Emily defeated Paula, preventing her from making it to the finale. On Battle of the Exes, Emily held a grudge against Paula for sending her into the Dome against Leroy Garrett & Naomi Defensor. Following the revelation that they would be going into the Dome, Emily claimed that Paula was only sending her in because she was afraid of her. Emily also became discontent with Paula's flirtation with Ty, which Emily felt was interfering with her relationship with Ty. Later, Emily and Camila mocked Paula and Ty with an unintentionally racist practical joke, in which Emily appeared in blackface by smearing Nutella on her face, and Camila mocked Paula. Eventually, they faced off in an elimination round, with their partners Dunbar Merrill and Ty Ruff, where Emily and Ty won.
- Jasmine & Theresa: The two got into an argument during Rivals, after their respective partners, Jonna Mannion and Camila Nakagawa, got into an argument. Both Jasmine and Theresa came to their partners' defense and eventually got into each other's faces. Ironically enough, Jasmine made a comment after their altercation, that if there was another rivals season, she knew Theresa would be her partner.
- Jonna & Nany: During the Battle of the Seasons reunion, Jonna stated that she felt Nany was not very nice to her. The two had bonded before the season, but Jonna did not stick up for Nany and prioritized her relationship with Zach Nichols. In addition, Nany felt she could not trust the alliance with Jonna's team over the course of the season and departed it. Nany told castmates Sarah and Trishelle that Jonna was "sleeping her way to the top" (in reference to her relationship/alliance with Zach).
- Sarah & Trishelle: On Battle of the Seasons, Trishelle was suspicious of Sarah's intentions when Sarah was flirting with Trishelle's teammate Alton Williams. After Team Las Vegas won a daily challenge, they selected Team Brooklyn to go into the Arena. This would later lead to a confrontation between Sarah and Trishelle, in which Trishelle told Sarah that, prior to her return to the series, she was warned of Sarah's untrustworthiness.

== Gameplay ==
=== Challenge games ===
- Game of Inches: Much like Catch and Release from the original Rivals, one partner stands on a platform suspended 30 feet above the water, while the other dangles over the water. The player on the platform must run and jump into the arms of the dangling partner, and hold onto them for 15 seconds. Those that fall are disqualified. This is performed in heats, and in each successive heat, the platform is pulled back by one foot. The last male and female teams to remain win the challenge, while the first male team to have one partner fall in the water goes straight to the Jungle.
  - Winners: Zach & Trey and Emily & Paula
- XXX Games This game is played on an obstacle course along the beach, with two sections. In the first section, each team must saw off a log, with the saw placed in between the legs of each partner, and use a "thrusting" motion in order to saw the log. The first team to saw off their designated log will earn a five-second headstart for the next section, while each successive team earns a one-second headstart. The second section is "Ball Gag," in which partners are attached at their torsos, and with one player upside down, each team must advance through a pile of tires and under a log, then one player has to retrieve a red ball perched atop a wooden pole with their mouths, then drop the ball on the sand, and have their partner deposit the ball into a trap door. The first teams to deposit the ball into their designated trap door win the challenge, while the last-place female team goes straight to the Jungle.
  - Winners: Emily & Paula and Trey & Zach
- Mind Over Splatter: Each team has to climb onto a rope ladder to a platform that is suspended 30 feet above water, then advance on a pair of 100-foot ropes over the water to a deck, and ring a bell. If a player falls into the water, that player can swim back to the starting line, however, a team is disqualified if they are unable to complete the challenge within a ten-minute time limit. The teams that make it to the deck and ring the bell in the fastest time wins, while the last-place male team goes straight to the Jungle.
  - Winners: Frank & Johnny and Emily & Paula
- Stumped: Each team has to advance through a maze in the sand consisting of numerous bamboo poles, with each partner tied together by their wrists to a 25-foot bamboo pole. A team is disqualified if they do not make it to the other side of the course within a 20-minute time limit. The teams that make it to the end of the obstacle course in the fastest time wins, while the last-place female team goes straight to the Jungle.
  - Winners: Emily & Paula and Jordan & Marlon
- Frog Smash: Each team has to advance from one end of a narrow 60-foot beam to the other that is suspended 30 feet above water. Eight swings are attached from a nearby platform with the opposing teams sitting on them, where they try to knock each partner off the beam and into the water. If one partner falls into the water, the other partner can still advance to the other side of the beam. Teammates advancing on the beam have to stay within two swings of each other in order to avoid a penalty. The team whose partners advance to the end of the beam in the fastest time wins, while the last-place male team goes straight to the Jungle.
  - Winners: CT & Wes and Jasmine & Theresa
- Frenemies: One partner is hanging from a platform suspended 30 feet above water, who had already been privately asked a series of questions about their partner prior to the start of the challenge. The other partners get asked the same series of questions. If the answers do not coincide, the pair is accessed one strike against them, the teammate hanging from the platform is dropped into the water on the second strike. For the women, the team whose partner is the first to hit the water is automatically sent to the Jungle. The last player hanging wins the challenge for their team, with the last female team standing winning immunity from the Jungle.
  - Winners: Emily & Paula and Leroy & Ty
- Blind Leading the Blind: Each team has to advance through a maze consisting of bamboo poles, with each partner having their wrists tied together, blindfolded and wearing electrical-shock dog collars. Each team member has to endure electrical shocks throughout the maze, and a team is disqualified if they do not make it to the end of the maze within a 30-minute time limit. The team that makes it to the end of the maze in the fastest time wins, with the fastest male team winning immunity from the Jungle and the last-place male team automatically sent to the Jungle.
  - Winners: Frank & Johnny and Aneesa & Diem
- Swingers: Each team has to swing from a trapeze suspended 40 feet above water toward a catch bar, drop into the water, then each partner has to swim toward and around a midway buoy, and back toward another buoy at the finish line. The team that makes it to the finish line in the fastest time wins, with the fastest female team winning immunity from the Jungle and the last-place female team automatically sent to the Jungle.
  - Winners: Camila & Jemmye and CT & Wes
- Rampage: Four ramps are perpendicularly linked over a pond. Each partner has to grab a ball, run down a ramp, and deposit a ball into a basket at the end of the opposite ramp across from their designated ramp. Two teams compete a time, with a total of 20 balls. The team that deposits the most balls into their designated basket within a three-minute time limit wins, with the fastest male team winning immunity from the Jungle and a guaranteed guys spot in the final challenge, while the last-place male team automatically sent to the Jungle.
  - Winners: CT & Wes and Emily & Paula
- Color Correction: Teams have to race on a trail along the beach, and memorize a sequence of colors (red, yellow, green and blue) from a blinking light panel that is located one mile from the starting line. Partners are chained to each other, and after memorizing the color sequence, each team races back to the starting line, and stacks circular plates on a pole that are of different colors. Each team has to stack colored plates in the order of which they flashed on the light panel. The challenge is played in two rounds, and the two teams that correctly stack their plates in the fastest time advance to the winner's round, while the two slowest teams are out, with the slowest team automatically sent to the Jungle. In the winners' round, the team that wins the second round wins immunity from the Jungle and a guaranteed girls spot in the final challenge.
  - Winners: Cara Maria & Cooke (Note: Only the female teams were shown competing in the "Color Correction" challenge as all of the remaining guys teams have already advanced to the finale.)

=== Jungle games ===
- Last Chance: Players must run through a narrow hallway past another contestant to ring a bell. Both teams have one offensive player and one defensive player. The offensive player who gets past the defensive player and rings the bell first in two out of three heats, wins the elimination.
  - Played by: Derek & Robb vs. Dunbar & Tyrie and Leroy & Ty vs. Jordan & Marlon
- Hanging by a Thread: Both teams are suspended upside down from a swing, and must use tiny saws to cut through a rope that is connected to the opposing team's swing. The first team to cut the rope and dunk their opponents in the water below wins the elimination.
  - Played by: Cara Maria & Cooke vs. Anastasia & Jessica and Aneesa & Diem vs. Camila & Jemmye
- Snapper: Played within a large circle, one player from each team has to swing and break a wooden stick at their opponent, while blindfolded. The blindfolded players wear bells on their shoes and are guided by their partners, who are standing outside of the circle. The team that breaks a stick on their opponent in two out of three heats wins the elimination.
  - Played by: Knight & Preston vs. Derek & Robb and Cara Maria & Cooke vs. Jonna & Nany
- Who Can Take It?: One player from each team is strapped to a metal gurney. 400,000 mega watts are then released to the gurney. The player who says they cannot handle it loses their round. (Note: The "Who Can Take It?" Jungle in Episode 4 was not played and both teams were saved, likely as the result of Team Sarah & Trishelle's withdrawal from the game during the previous episode.)
- Breaking on Through: Two three-story towers are placed in the center of the Jungle — one for each team. Each team has to open trap doors and "break through" each floor below using metal tools. Once a team has made it to ground level, each team has to "break through" a steel door, and ring a bell on the other side of the door. Each partner has to alternate breaking through each floor in order to avoid disqualification. The first team to properly break through each floor and ring a bell wins.
  - Played by: Leroy & Ty vs. Trey & Zach and Jordan & Marlon vs. Knight & Preston
- Catch-22: Both team members run on a treadmill across from each other, behind a mud pit. Then they toss twenty-two balls over a net and to their partner who dunks the balls in a basket. The treadmills move faster as the elimination round progresses, and a team loses a round if one partner falls from the treadmill. The team with the most balls in their basket two out of three times wins the elimination.
  - Played by: Camila & Jemmye vs. Jasmine & Theresa

=== Final challenge ===
The first part of the final challenge begins with the remaining six teams swimming one mile in the middle of the ocean to "Dream Island", where each team has to solve three geometric puzzles — a square, a cube and a cross. Prior to the start of the final challenge, it is revealed that there is only room for four teams — two of each gender — on the super yacht. To get to the yacht, each team will have a 60-minute time limit to build replicas of the aforementioned shapes with oversize blocks that match each team's designated diagrams, retrieve a key to a kayak, and paddle their way to the yacht. If a team does not solve their designated puzzle within a 60-minute limit, they are permitted to retrieve a key to a kayak, provided that the other competing teams do not correctly solve their puzzles beforehand. The third-place finishers of each gender are eliminated from the remainder of the final challenge, and win $15,000, while the top two teams of each gender advance to the next phase of the final challenge.

The second part of the final challenge begins with the remaining four teams that made it to the super yacht swimming their way to "Nightmare Island", where each team has to retrieve a golden elephant by earning an idol at five separate checkpoints. At the first checkpoint, each team must remove 14 out of 15 spikes (with voodoo doll heads) on a large, triangular peg board, by jumping over each spike only once. After a team completes a checkpoint, that team must signal the completion of their checkpoint by pulling the pin on a smoke grenade and dropping it in a bucket. The second checkpoint is "What's Mine Is Yours", in which each team must cut through a chain-link fence with a pair of dykes, then solve a mathematical puzzle involving a Pythagorean theorem in order to determine the hypotenuse of a triangle. Each team then has to cut one of five colored ropes that corresponds to a correct answer. If a team makes an incorrect answer, all five ropes have to be cut before they are allowed to continue to the next checkpoint. At the third checkpoint "Food Test", each team must eat and drink a variety of disgusting foods and liquids from numbered receptacles, and in numerical order. A key is located at the bottom of the final jar, which will unlock a cabinet containing an idol. At the fourth checkpoint, "Body Issues", each team must move 20 body bags from one side of a course to another. After each body bag has been removed, a sign at the bottom of the pile instructs each team to dig into the ground and retrieve a treasure chest that contains the fourth idol. At the fifth and final checkpoint, "Tunnel Vision", each team must dig a tunnel that leads underneath a cage consisting of bamboo poles, with the final idol located inside the cage. The first team of each gender to retrieve all five idols and the golden elephant, make their way towards the beach, where they use a canoe to reach a yacht, wins $125,000.

- Winners: CT & Wes and Emily & Paula
- Second place: Frank & Johnny and Cara Maria & Cooke
- Third place: Jordan & Marlon and Camila & Jemmye

== Game summary ==
Episode		Gender	Winners		Jungle contestants		Jungle game	Jungle outcome	
#	Challenge	Gender	Prize	Safety	Last-place	Voted in	Jungle game	Winners	Eliminated
1	Game of Inches	Male	Emily & Paula	Trey & Zach	Dunbar & Tyrie	Derek & Robb	Last Chance	Derek & Robb	Dunbar & Tyrie
2	XXX Games	Female	Trey & Zach	Emily & Paula	Anastasia & Jessica	Cara Maria & Cooke	Hanging by a Thread	Cara Maria & Cooke	Anastasia & Jessica
3	Mind Over Splatter	Male	Emily & Paula	Frank & Johnny	Knight & Preston	Derek & Robb	Snapper	Knight & Preston	Derek & Robb
4	Stumped	Female	Jordan & Marlon	Emily & Paula	Jasmine & Theresa	Cara Maria & Cooke	Who Can Take It?	—N/a	
5	Frog Smash	Male	Jasmine & Theresa	CT & Wes	Trey & Zach	Leroy & Ty	Breaking on Through	Leroy & Ty	Trey & Zach
6	Frenemies	Female	Leroy & Ty	Emily & Paula	Camila & Jemmye	Jasmine & Theresa	Catch-22	Camila & Jemmye	Jasmine & Theresa
7	Blind Leading the Blind	Male	Aneesa & Diem	Frank & Johnny	Leroy & Ty	Jordan & Marlon	Last Chance	Jordan & Marlon	Leroy & Ty
8	Swingers	Female	CT & Wes	Camila & Jemmye	Cara Maria & Cooke	Jonna & Nany	Snapper	Cara Maria & Cooke	Jonna & Nany
9	Rampage	Male	Emily & Paula	CT & Wes	Knight & Preston	Jordan & Marlon	Breaking on Through	Jordan & Marlon	Knight & Preston
10/11	Color Correction	Female	—N/a	Cara Maria & Cooke	Aneesa & Diem	Camila & Jemmye	Hanging by a Thread	Camila & Jemmye	Aneesa & Diem
11/12	Dream Island				3rd: Jordan & Marlon and Camila & Jemmye				
11/12	Nightmare Island		CT & Wes		2nd: Frank & Johnny				
11/12	Nightmare Island		Emily & Paula		2nd: Cara Maria & Cooke				

=== Elimination progress ===
Teams	Challenges										
Teams	1	2	3	4	5	6	7	8	9	10/11	Final
CT & Wes	SAFE	SAFE	SAFE	SAFE	WIN	SAFE	SAFE	WON	WIN	—N/a	WINNERS
Emily & Paula	WON	WIN	WON	WIN	SAFE	WIN	SAFE	SAFE	WON	SAFE	WINNERS
Frank & Johnny	SAFE	SAFE	WIN	SAFE	SAFE	SAFE	WIN	SAFE	SAFE	—N/a	SECOND
Cooke & Cara Maria	—N/a	ELIM	SAFE	RISK	SAFE	SAFE	SAFE	ELIM	SAFE	WIN	SECOND
Jordan & Marlon	SAFE	SAFE	SAFE	WON	SAFE	SAFE	ELIM	SAFE	ELIM	—N/a	THIRD
Camila & Jemmye	SAFE	SAFE	SAFE	SAFE	SAFE	ELIM	SAFE	WIN	SAFE	ELIM	THIRD
Aneesa & Diem	SAFE	SAFE	SAFE	SAFE	SAFE	SAFE	WON	SAFE	SAFE	OUT	
Knight & Preston	SAFE	SAFE	ELIM	SAFE	SAFE	SAFE	SAFE	SAFE	OUT		
Jonna & Nany	SAFE	SAFE	SAFE	SAFE	SAFE	SAFE	SAFE	OUT			
Leroy & Ty	SAFE	SAFE	SAFE	SAFE	ELIM	WON	OUT				
Jasmine & Theresa	SAFE	SAFE	SAFE	RISK	WON	OUT					
Trey & Zach	WIN	WON	SAFE	SAFE	DQ						
Derek & Robb	ELIM	SAFE	OUT								
Sarah & Trishelle	SAFE	SAFE	WD								
Anastasia & Jessica	SAFE	OUT									
Dunbar & Tyrie	OUT										
~~Cooke~~ & Naomi	QUIT										

Competition
The team won the competition
The team finished second in the final challenge
The team finished in third place, after being eliminated on Day 1 of the final challenge
The team won the challenge, and was safe from the Jungle
The team won the challenge and $1,000
The team was not selected for the Jungle
The team was selected for the Jungle, but did not have to compete
The team won in the Jungle
The team lost in the Jungle and was eliminated
The team was disqualified in the Jungle and was eliminated
A contestant withdrew from the competition, but one partner later received a replacement teammate
A contestant withdrew from the competition, and his/her partner was also eliminated

== Voting history ==
Last-Place	Dunbar & Tyrie	Anastasia & Jessica	Knight & Preston	Jasmine & Theresa	Trey & Zach	Camila & Jemmye	Leroy & Ty	Cara Maria & Cooke	Knight & Preston	Aneesa & Diem
Voted Into Jungle	Derek & Robb; 5 of 8 votes	Cara Maria & Cooke; 4 of 7 votes	Derek & Robb; 3 of 6 votes	Cara Maria & Cooke; 5 of 6 votes	Leroy & Ty; 3 of 6 votes	Jasmine & Theresa; 2 of 5 votes	Jordan & Marlon; 4 of 5 votes	Jonna & Nany; 3 of 4 votes	Jordan & Marlon; 3 of 4 votes	Camila & Jemmye; 2 of 3 votes
Teams	Episode									
Teams	1	2	3	4	5	6	7	8	9	10/11
Emily & Paula	Derek & Robb		Derek & Robb		Knight & Preston		Jordan & Marlon		Jordan & Marlon	
CT & Wes		Sarah & Trishelle		Cara Maria & Cooke		Jasmine & Theresa		Jonna & Nany		Emily & Paula
Cara Maria & Cooke	—N/a		Jordan & Marlon		Frank & Johnny		Jordan & Marlon		Frank & Johnny	
Frank & Johnny		Cara Maria & Cooke		Cara Maria & Cooke		Cara Maria & Cooke		Jonna & Nany		Camila & Jemmye
Camila & Jemmye	Derek & Robb		Derek & Robb		Jordan & Marlon		Jordan & Marlon		Jordan & Marlon	
Jordan & Marlon		Cara Maria & Cooke		Cara Maria & Cooke		Jasmine & Theresa		Emily & Paula		Camila & Jemmye
Aneesa & Diem	Derek & Robb		Derek & Robb		Leroy & Ty		Jordan & Marlon		Jordan & Marlon	
Knight & Preston		Cara Maria & Cooke		Cara Maria & Cooke		Jonna & Nany		Jonna & Nany		
Jonna & Nany	Knight & Preston		Jordan & Marlon		Leroy & Ty		Knight & Preston			
Leroy & Ty		Jasmine & Theresa		Jonna & Nany		Aneesa & Diem				
Jasmine & Theresa	Jordan & Marlon		Leroy & Ty		Leroy & Ty					
Trey & Zach		Cara Maria & Cooke		Cara Maria & Cooke						
Derek & Robb		Sarah & Trishelle								
Sarah & Trishelle	Derek & Robb									
Anastasia & Jessica	Derek & Robb									
Dunbar & Tyrie										
~~Cooke~~ & Naomi	Jordan & Marlon									

== Episodes ==
No. overall	No. in season	Title	Original release date	US viewers (millions)
293	1	"Rumble in the Jungle"	July 10, 2013	1.57
294	2	"New Girl"	July 17, 2013	1.40
295	3	"The Dark Knight Rises"	July 24, 2013	1.61
296	4	"Mortuusequusphobia"	July 31, 2013	1.78
297	5	"What The Phuket?!"	August 7, 2013	1.48
298	6	"Revenge Is a Dish Best Not Serve"	August 14, 2013	1.34
299	7	"Crossing Jordan"	August 21, 2013	1.34
300	8	"Thrilla in Camila"	August 28, 2013	1.36
301	9	"Diemnesia"	September 4, 2013	1.54
302	10	"True Colors"	September 11, 2013	1.34
303	11	"Final Destination"	September 18, 2013	1.27
304	12	"The Island of Misfit Challengers"	September 25, 2013	1.61

=== Reunion special ===
The Challenge: Rivals II Reunion was aired live after the season finale on September 25, 2013, and was hosted by Jonny Moseley. The cast members who attended the reunion were: CT, Wes, Emily, Paula, Johnny, Frank, Cara Maria, Jordan, Marlon, Camila, Jemmye, Knight, Preston, Aneesa and Diem. Knight was removed after getting into a physical altercation with Frank.
