= The Real World: Brooklyn =

Coordinates: 40°40′36″N 74°01′10″W

- Season 21
- The cast of The Real World: Brooklyn
- Starring: Sarah Rice; Baya Voce; Chet Cannon; JD Ordoñez; Katelynn Cusanelli; Scott Herman; Devyn Simone; Ryan Conklin
- No. of episodes: 13

Release
- Original network: MTV
- Original release: January 7 – April 1, 2009

Season chronology
- ← Previous; The Real World: Hollywood Next → The Real World: Cancun

The Real World: Brooklyn is the twenty-first season of MTV's reality television series The Real World, which focuses on a group of diverse strangers living together for several months in a different city each season, as cameras follow their lives and interpersonal relationships. It is the fourth season of The Real World to be filmed in the Mid-Atlantic region of the United States, specifically in New York City after The Real World: Back to New York.

It was the first season to include an openly transgender cast member, Katelynn Cusanelli. It also is the first season to feature more than seven cast members, as it featured eight housemates living on Pier 41 in Red Hook. Although it is the only season to set in the borough of Brooklyn, it is also the third season to take place in a city that had hosted a previous season, as the show's first and tenth seasons were set in New York in 1992 and 2001.

The season was aired as 13 one-hour episodes. MTV announced the location in May 2008. The series premiered January 7, 2009, and garnered an 18% increase in ratings over the previous season with 2.3 million viewers. The premiere was made available on iTunes on January 8. On January 4, MTV aired a special called The Real World: Secrets Revealed that documents the evolution of the series over the years.

Prior to the beginning of the season Jon Murray, co-creator of The Real World, and Chairman and President of Bunim-Murray Productions, explained the choice of Brooklyn: "The Brooklyn season, like the Hollywood season, will focus on what people loved about 'The Real World' when it launched in 1992 - genuine people, meaningful conflict and powerful stories...We're thrilled that MTV is allowing 'The Real World' turn 21!" Cast member Chet Cannon remarked on the city that was his home for three months, "Brooklyn is usually spoken of as more a place where you don’t want to go — I just don’t want to get shot down here."

Anthony Swofford, author of Jarhead, makes an appearance this season when cast member Ryan Conklin attends a meeting of Iraq Veterans Against the War.

== Season changes ==
Almost every season of The Real World, beginning with its fifth season, has included the assignment of a season-long group job or task to the housemates, continued participation in which has been mandatory to remain part of the cast since the Back to New York season. However, no group assignment is given to the cast this season; the castmates are free to pursue their own interests, the first such season to do this since the fourth season. The group assignment returned the following season, though producer Jon Murray indicated a desire to dispense with the group assignment again with The Real World: Washington D.C.

Brooklyn is the first season of the series to feature eight cast members moving into the residence together in the premiere. (All previous seasons premiered with seven-member casts, and only introduced new cast members when the departure of others during production necessitated replacements.) This number remains in subsequent seasons. It is also the first season to include an openly transgender cast member, Katelynn Cusanelli.

This is the first season, and the first MTV series, to be broadcast in high definition.

== The residence ==
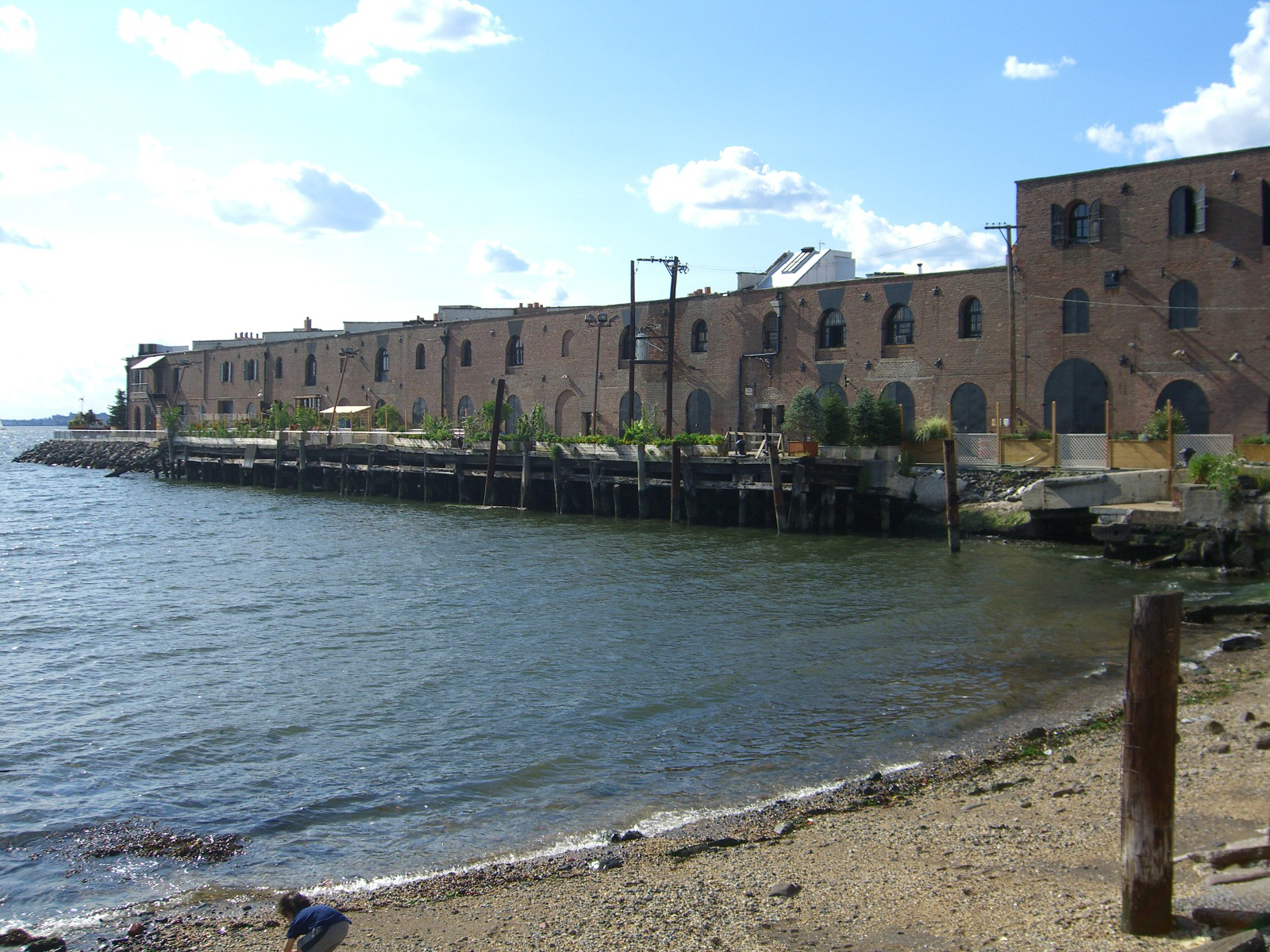
Pier 41 in Red Hook, Brooklyn, where the cast resided.

It was originally reported that the cast would be staying at the BellTel Lofts in Downtown Brooklyn, but problems obtaining permits for the construction required MTV to seek a new location. The production chose Pier 41 at 204 Van Dyke Street in the Red Hook area of Brooklyn. Pier 41 was also used as the setting for a bar scene in the 2005 Will Smith film, Hitch. This marked the second time a pier was used as a season residence for the cast after 1998's The Real World: Seattle.

== Cast ==
This was the first season of Real World to feature a cast of eight roommates living together. The cast included a trans woman, Katelynn Cusanelli, a first for the series. The cast was photographed publicly for the first time at a Semi Precious Weapons New York Fashion Week party at the Manhattan club Rebel in early September 2008.

Cast member	Age^{1}	Hometown
Baya Voce	21	Salt Lake City, Utah
Baya, like Chet, is from Salt Lake City, but is not a Mormon, which has caused her to feel isolated in her hometown. Raised by hippie parents, she is a dedicated hip-hop DJ who aspires to be a dancer, and has been described as "the token cute white female" and "laid back", though she suffers from panic attacks. She is active in social and environmental causes.
Chet Cannon	23	Salt Lake City, Utah
Chet has been described as a "punk rock Mormon", a "hipster" and "straight as an arrow", who eschews alcohol and premarital sex. He is a conservative Republican, (one of two among the housemates, along with Scott), a University of Utah fraternity member with nine siblings, and an occasional prankster. He is an aspiring TV host, and his stated goal on the series is to "show people that Mormons are fun." Chet becomes best friends with Ryan.
Devyn Simone	20	Kansas City, Missouri
Devyn was Miss American Teen in 2005, and a Miss Missouri Teen. She is a black woman who has been described as a flirtatious diva who likes attention at clubs and on stage, and a sexual person who likes to tease men, and juggle multiple suitors. She is a theatre and music studies major at the University of South Florida who hopes to work in the entertainment industry. She is close to her mother, and was close to her late grandmother. She purchases a Yorkie that she names Brooklyn.
JD Ordoñez	22	Miami Beach, Florida
JD is a half Cuban, half Puerto Rican gay man who, along with his brothers and sister, suffered violent physical abuse at the hands of his father, and lived on welfare. He ran away from home at thirteen, spending some time in foster care, and ensured that his father was repeatedly sent to jail for his abuse. He feels his experiences made him a stronger, independent person. The first among his four siblings to graduate from high school, he put himself through college at the University of Miami, and now works as a dolphin trainer, a dream job he first envisioned in a trip to SeaWorld at age five. A high school competitive swimmer, he became one of the youngest dolphin trainers at Miami Seaquarium at nineteen. He came out to his parents about his sexuality at sixteen, and because of this, he immediately bonds with Katelynn, who confides her transgender status only to him in the premiere.
Katelynn Cusanelli	24	West Palm Beach, Florida
Katelynn, or Kat, is an Italian-American trans woman who had a rough childhood. She first realized her gender variance in high school and began living as a woman at 17, which was difficult given her rigid, Sicilian family. She began her transition almost five years prior to moving into the Real World house, and completed her gender reassignment surgery in Thailand in July 2008. She is a self-described computer geek, and holds a black belt in Tae Kwon Do. She has a boyfriend named Mike whom she hopes to marry. In the season premiere, she initially reveals her transgender status only to JD, though she eventually comes into conflict with him over this and other matters, and reveals her status to the others. She has lost three close friends to AIDS, which inspires her charity work.
Ryan Conklin	23	Gettysburg, Pennsylvania
Ryan was in the Army for three and a half years, having been inspired by the September 11 Attacks to enlist at the age of 17. He spent a year in Iraq, guarded Saddam Hussein at his trial, and suffered a number of near-death experiences. He suffers from knee problems and posttraumatic stress as a result of his tour of duty. He expresses these experiences through his guitar playing, and in a 300-page single-space typed journal. He is described by The Brooklyn Paper as "the fun one" in the premiere. His experiences in Iraq made him highly critical of the war's execution, and hopes a victory for Barack Obama in the 2008 Presidential Election will preclude his being recalled to Iraq. He is an aspiring filmmaker who hopes to study at the University of Pittsburgh, and a class clown who plays pranks. He has a girlfriend named Belle. His brother Aaron is a military police officer in the Army Reserves, and they have two cousins in the Army as well. He learns in Episode 11 that he is being recalled to active duty.
Sarah Rice	22	San Francisco, California
Sarah is an artist who suffered sexual abuse by a teacher and inappropriate behavior by her father, whom she has tried unsuccessfully to have imprisoned, and to whom she has not spoken for eight years, a silence that is broken when he calls her in Episode 4. She has dedicated herself to advocate for survivors of abuse as an art therapist. She hopes to show her art in a gallery, and recently began a relationship with a man to whom her mother introduced her, one of her first heterosexual relationships, as most of her prior ones were with women, though she prefers not to label her sexual orientation. Sarah, whose appearance is described to be that of a "tattooed punk", is observed by The Brooklyn Paper to be the only cast member with an interest in anyone else on a deeper level in the premiere, as contrasted with the gossip-like focus of the other castmates' discussions.
Scott Herman	23	Salem, New Hampshire
Scott is a personal trainer, model and actor who has been working out since the age of 14. He recently received the designation of having the "best abs on the East Coast", and was featured in Men's Health magazine. The first in his family to graduate from college, he educates the public on health and fitness with his website. Along with Chet, he is one of two Republicans in the house.

^Note 1: Age at time of filming.

== Episodes ==
No. overall	No. in season	Title	Original release date
454	1	"Brooklyn Bridging"	January 7, 2009
The cast assembles at Pier 41 for the first time. Ryan, sensing that there is something "definitely different" about Katelynn, speculates that she is a trans woman. The women, especially Devyn, notice how attractive Scott is. Ryan's drinking causes concern for the others when they enjoy a night out together. He later discusses the effect of his time in Iraq, and how he channels it into his journal and music. J.D., who is gay, bonds with Kat, causing further conflict with Ryan, who perceives them to be excluding the others. Kat does not perceive Ryan to be the type of person who would be accepting if she came out to him, but because of the painful experiences that both she and J.D. experienced, they form an emotional rapport.
455	2	"The Outs And Ins of Brooklyn"	January 14, 2009
Kat comes out to Sarah and Baya. Ryan takes umbrage with some of the topical discussions among the others. The housemates take issue with Chet's pranks, but when J.D. talks to Chet about Chet having gone through his belongings, Chet denies the accusation, and is offended at the others talking about this outside his presence. Baya pursues her dance aspirations. A trip to a gay bar proves interesting for Chet and Ryan. The cast enjoys a visit from Chet's family. J.D. deals with the identity theft committed against him by his father. Comments about immigrants from a drunken J.D. lead to a heated argument with Chet, and a subsequent discussion about family.
456	3	"The BFF-O-Meter"	January 21, 2009
Ryan pursues his professional musical interests, making contacts at a bar owned by Pete Wentz of Fall Out Boy. Kat deals with the difficulties of her long-distance relationship with her boyfriend, Mike, and looks elsewhere for companionship. Devyn and Scott, who regard each other as "BFF"'s, express their mutual attraction through flirting, but Devin is frustrated by what she sees as mixed signals by Scott, and questions regarding whether or not he is single. Baya, Chet and Ryan meet with an agency named Crush Management in order to further their aspirations. Baya and Ryan flirt with each other, and he joins her and the other girls in a pole dancing workout class, but they have different ideas about their relationship.
457	4	"Daddy Dearest and the Dueling Divas"	January 28, 2009
Devyn pursues her acting and music aspirations, but not without complications. Chet explores his romantic opportunities with a woman named Alex, even though they may conflict with his religious beliefs. Sarah discusses the childhood sexual abuse she suffered the hands of a teacher and inappropriate behavior from her father, to whom she hasn't spoken in eight years, an issue that becomes more immediate when she receives unwanted phone calls from him that greatly disturb her. A drunken J.D. outs Katelynn to Chet, and insults Devyn, offending all three of them, and leading to an impromptu sing-off between Devyn and another female singer at a club.
458	5	"Friends and Enemies"	February 4, 2009
Scott, in the aftermath of the breakup from his girlfriend, Marissa, sees a number of women, inspiring gossip and parody among Devyn and the others. Ryan's pranks lead to a retaliation by J.D., and a heated argument. Chet pursues his aspirations of being a TV host, and receives some constructive criticism, a disappointing surprise when he visits the filming location of Total Request Live, and an interview with Pete Wentz. The suicide of one of Ryan's Army friends gives him cause to discuss the posttraumatic stress disorder that afflicts some of his fellow soldiers, his own traumatic memories of the Iraq War, and how the September 11 Attacks led to his enlistment. He also discusses the effect on him of the seventh anniversary, ceremonies for which he plans to attend.
459	6	"Battle of the Sexes"	February 11, 2009
Kat's expression of her newfound comfort with her body causes discomfort for her housemates, including Ryan, who learns of her transgender status by eavesdropping on her during her confessional. Kat, J.D. and Sarah participate in Braking the Cycle, a charity bike ride from Ryan's hometown of Gettysburg, Pennsylvania to Brooklyn to raise AIDS/HIV awareness. The entire cast goes to Gettysburg to support the trio and to meet Ryan's family, but conflict is generated by the girls' tardiness, Kat's behavior at a restaurant, and Chet's behavior at the event's opening ceremony. This also leads to a heated argument between J.D. and Devyn. Kat comes out to Devyn, but is still ambivalent about doing so with Ryan, who wonders why she has not done so yet, and decides to pursue the matter more directly. Kat is honest with him, but later is angered by both his and J.D.'s indiscretion.
460	7	"Of Mice and Devyn's Men"	February 18, 2009
A mouse infestation disturbs the housemates and provides fodder for pranks. Devyn juggles calls and emails from a suitor named Jim, and a visit from David, whom she refers to as her "semi-fiancé", and at other times as a "friend" who is in love with her. They try to work on their relationship, but Chet does not approve of her seeing two men. Ryan's girlfriend Belle comes for a visit, causing Ryan to consider the unwelcome possibility of being recalled to Iraq. Devyn ultimately decides she's not ready to be in a relationship with David or anyone else.
461	8	"Angry Boys and Dirty Girls"	February 25, 2009
The men, particularly J.D., object to the women's refusal to help maintain cleanliness around the loft, as well as with other issues stemming from Devyn and Sarah's behavior, but the women refuse to accept the chores in question or agree to a house meeting. Ryan pursues his filmmaking interests, as does Sarah with the art therapy classes she teaches at the Gay and Lesbian Community Center. The group's feud over cleanliness eventually escalates into heated arguments, and violence on J.D.'s part.
462	9	"Dilators, Dresses and Bow Ties"	March 4, 2009
Chet asks Kat about her transgender transition, but she is not appreciative of the disrespectful tone his questions take. Devyn pursues a job with a dress designer, and tries to help Sarah with a modeling job. Chet conducts an interview at Atlantic Records, and further pursues his VJ dreams, but all does not go as planned. Baya, who continues her dance training, explains why she did not accept the dance conservatory's offer, but the military-trained Ryan thinks that her resilience in the face of difficulty could use improvement. Kat launches a website to promote openness and awareness among the transgender community, sparking a more serious conversation on the topic between her and Chet.
463	10	"Pole Dancing and Pedro"	March 11, 2009
The cast is invited to a private screening of Pedro, a feature film about Pedro Zamora, the late AIDS activist and cast member of The Real World: San Francisco, and is asked to promote and host a screening for a larger group, but Chet is offended at the reasons given for why he should not be one of the hosts. Scott's family visits to celebrate his 24th birthday, along with his roommates, but Kat, who is broke, needs to work that night. This leads to a series of pranks by an offended Scott, and a heated argument. Kat eventually realizes that she does not have enough money to stay in the house, and resolves to leave, but Scott comes to her aid by giving her $1,500 to pay her bills.
464	11	"Saving a Private Ryan"	March 18, 2009
Ryan, whose experiences in the Iraq War have made him highly critical of its execution, hopes a Barack Obama victory in the 2008 United States Presidential election will preclude a return to Iraq. He attends a meeting of Iraq Veterans Against the War, where Anthony Swofford, author of Jarhead, speaks. He also seeks help from Iraq and Afghanistan Veterans of America (IAVA) for his knees, and for posttraumatic stress, from which some of his friends and housemates suspect he suffers, in part after seeing his short film, No More Tomorrow, in which his character commits suicide. On Election Night, Ryan, J.D., Kat and Sarah are elated at Obama's victory, but Scott and Chet, the lone Republicans and John McCain voters in the house, are offended at some of their behavior, leading to more pranks. Ryan and a war buddy march in the Veterans Day Parade, and discuss a fallen comrade. The housemates attend an IAVA gala. Ryan is crushed to learn he's being recalled to active duty.
465	12	"Atlantic City, Baby!"	March 25, 2009
Ryan and the others deal with the news that he has been recalled for a one-year deployment in Iraq. After Devyn buys a Yorkshire Terrier she names Brooklyn, the housemates decide to bond prior to Ryan's departure with a group trip to Atlantic City, where their experiences include a stay at the Borgata Hotel & Casino, attempts at gambling that meet with mixed results, Ryan pondering his future with Belle, Devyn's attempt to have fun despite being too young to gamble, and an awkward moment when Chet tries to rouse a sleeping Devyn. Ryan begins preparations for his tour of duty, as do his housemates, who give him a journal to maintain in Iraq.
466	13	"Saying Goodbye"	April 1, 2009
The housemates prepare to move out as their stay in the house nears its end. Scott, Baya and Devyn plan to stay in New York, and move in together as roommates. Ryan prepares to report for active duty as part of Operation: Iraqi Freedom, but not before getting into an altercation at a bar. The women engage in one last war of pranks, with J.D. caught in the middle, and Ryan reacting with outrage. Despite the conflict, the group bonds one last time over Ryan's guitar music on their last night together, and enjoys some emotional exchanges as they each leave the loft the next day.

== After filming ==
The Real World: Brooklyn Reunion premiered on April 1, 2009, following the premiere of the season finale. The program, hosted by Maria Menounos, featured all eight housemates. Ryan, whose appearance was a surprise to the other seven, is set to leave for Fort Bragg, North Carolina before leaving for Iraq. Sarah and J.D. returned to San Francisco and Miami, respectively, while Kat has gotten a job as an I.T. specialist at the University of Montana. Baya has been producing music and deejaying while living with Scott and Devyn in New York City. Among the topics discussed are how life has changed for the cast, the argument in the season finale, Sarah and Kat's unresolved issues with J.D., the gender conflict in the house, with Ryan and Chet taking issue with what they saw as Sarah's lack of sincerity and prejudice, and the cast's feelings about Ryan's recall. It is revealed that Ryan and Belle broke up, and that he and Baya are in a relationship.

Chet Cannon later appeared in the 2010 VH1 Presents program, The New Virginity, which explores the pop culture movement in which young people declare their chastity, including entertainers and other public figures who make it a part of their public persona. He eventually moved to New York City, and does speaking engagements for Path-U-Find Media with fellow The Real World: New Orleans alumna Julie Stoffer. He continues to work in improv and with MTV. Cannon hosted after shows for The Real World: San Diego (2011) and Real World: Ex-Plosion. He got married in 2014. All of his former roommates were in attendance, excluding Sarah Rice.

Katelynn Cusanelli speaks across college campuses on LGBT issues. In 2008, she had been dating her boyfriend, Mike, for more than two years. She eventually married, but by July 2012 had recently divorced.

Scott Herman appeared in the movies Living Will and Heist. He is currently a personal trainer and has a YouTube channel with over 2 million subscribers.

Sarah Rice became engaged on October 15, 2014 and got married in May 2015. Susie Meister from Road Rules: Down Under served as a bridesmaid, while former roommates Chet Cannon and Baya Voce, alongside Frank Sweeney from The Real World: San Diego and Theresa Gonzalez from Fresh Meat II were in attendance. In 2018, she spoke about suffering a miscarriage. In the subsequent year, she announced her and husband Landon Patterson were going through a divorce.

Devyn Simone hosted and produced Love at First Swipe on TLC alongside Clinton Kelly from What Not to Wear. The show ran for 14 episodes total. Simone also hosted some episodes of The Wendy Williams Show. She got engaged in 2015.

=== The Challenge ===
Cast member	Seasons of The Challenge
Baya Voce	—N/a
Chet Cannon	The Ruins, Cutthroat (2010), Battle of the Seasons (2012), Free Agents
Devyn Simone	Battle of the Seasons (2012), Free Agents
JD Ordoñez	Cutthroat (2010), Battle of the Seasons (2012)
Katelynn Cusanelli	Fresh Meat II, Rivals
Ryan Conklin	—N/a
Sarah Rice	The Ruins, Fresh Meat II, Cutthroat (2010), Rivals, Battle of the Exes, Battle of the Seasons (2012), Rivals II, Battle of the Exes II, Rivals III
Scott Herman	—N/a

Note
Sarah appeared on Cutthroat (2026) for an elimination.

== Reception ==
The Real World: Brooklyn was nominated in the "Outstanding Reality Program" category at the 21st GLAAD Media Awards.
