= Ryan A. Conklin =

American soldier and TV personality (born 1985)

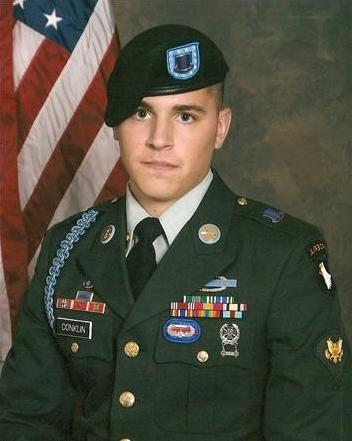
- Portrait of SPC Conklin, 2006
- Born: Ryan Allen Conklin; April 1, 1985 (age 41); Marshall, Michigan, U.S.
- Military career
- Allegiance: United States
- Branch: United States Army
- Service years: 2003–2010
- Rank: Sergeant
- Units: 101st Airborne Division, 3rd Brigade Combat Team, 3rd Battalion, 187th Infantry Regiment; North Carolina National Guard, 30th Heavy Brigade Combat Team, 252nd Combined Arms Battalion
- Conflicts: Iraq War
- Awards: Army Commendation Medal; Army Achievement Medal (2); Good Conduct Medal (2)

Ryan Allen Conklin (born April 1, 1985) is a former Sergeant in the United States Army, known as a cast member on the MTV reality television series, The Real World: Brooklyn, and star of The Real World Presents: Return to Duty, a 2009 documentary that chronicled his second tour of duty serving as part of Operation Iraqi Freedom, and author of the Iraq War memoir, An Angel From Hell.

== Early life ==
Conklin was born on April 1, 1985, in Marshall, Michigan to Dave and Pat Conklin. He was the youngest of three children. The son of a Marshall teacher, Ryan attended the public elementary schools of Gordon, Sherman, and Madison. In 1996, he and his family moved to Gettysburg, Pennsylvania. Growing up in Gettysburg, a historic landmark for the nation, Ryan harbored a strong sense of history, and an affinity for the military, and eventually graduated from Gettysburg High School in 2003.

In addition to his brother, Aaron, who became a military police officer in the Army Reserves, Conklin also had two cousins in the Army as well.

== Military and reality television career ==
=== First tour of duty ===
Conklin enlisted in the United States Army at age 17, having been inspired to do so by the September 11 attacks. He entered Basic Training at Fort Benning, Georgia in 2003 and was stationed at Fort Campbell, Kentucky

Ryan was an infantryman in the 187th Infantry Regiment (United States), 3rd Brigade of the famed 101st Airborne Division. In 2005, he deployed with the division to Iraq, guarded Saddam Hussein at his trial in Baghdad, but his company spent most of their year deployment patrolling Tikrit and experienced a number of near-death experiences from IEDs, drive-by shootings, VBIEDs, suicide bomber, and a sniper. During his time on The Real World, it was also revealed that he suffered attacks of posttraumatic stress as a result of his tour of duty. He was honorably discharged in 2006.

Conklin's book An Angel From Hell (2010) chronicles himself and his platoon during this chaotic tour.

=== The Real World: Brooklyn ===
In 2008, after returning from his first tour in Iraq, Conklin was cast on the 21st season of the MTV reality series, The Real World in 2008. On being selected, Conklin said that it almost started as a joke. MTV was casting at a bar he was visiting, and he decided to apply. He says that he was stunned to learn he made the final cut. His cast biography is as follows:

A small-town Pennsylvania boy with a laid-back personality, Ryan has had his share of action. After enlisting in the army at the age of 17, he served in Iraq and got an eyeful. Now 23, he has returned from his duty with a newfound appreciation for life and a better perspective on the world around him, despite having lived through many near-death experiences, as well as the death of a close friend. A class clown who juggles his time between amateur filmmaking, guitar playing and pranking those around him, Ryan is currently in his first-ever relationship.

During his time on The Real World: Brooklyn, Conklin related his experiences in the Iraq War and became a candid and creative representative of today's veterans. As a former soldier with job skills and experiences that could still help the war effort, in 2008 President George W. Bush recalled thousands of former soldiers in the inactive ready reserve as part of a surge on both battlefields, which happened to unfold during the filming of The Real World, and Conklin was recalled to deploy to Iraq.

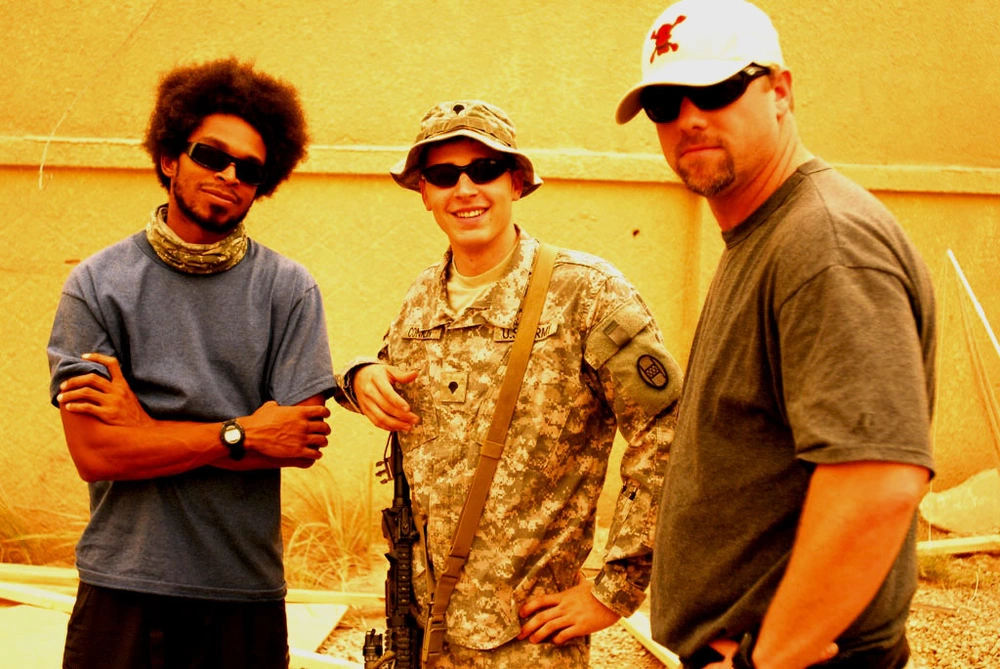
Conklin in Iraq with The Real World crew members while filming Return to Duty

=== Second tour of duty ===
In November 2008, while filming The Real World, Conklin found out, much to his shock, that he was being called back to active duty. On April 1, 2009, the day he was supposed to report to Fort Bragg, North Carolina before leaving, Conklin surprised his Real World castmates by appearing on the reunion show. He returned to Iraq later that month, serving in the southern Saydiyah section of Baghdad as an infantryman, and was eventually promoted to the rank of Sergeant.

Before deploying, MTV and the producers of the Real World pitched him the idea for a documentary following his returning to Iraq as well as his family members' reactions. Though initially reluctant, Conklin agreed. The documentary, fully titled The Real World Presents: Return to Duty, aired on November 11, 2009. Conklin says that he was "very pleased with how it all came together".

In January 2010 Conklin was again honorably discharged from the Army.

== Later work ==
Conklin traveled throughout the United States and gave lectures to colleges and universities and spoke to students about his time in Iraq.

Conklin's memoir about his experience during his first tour in Iraq, An Angel From Hell, was published In April 2010.

Conklin subsequently became a firefighter with the Lancaster, Pennsylvania Fire Department, where he received an award in March 2019 for saving the life of a 10-year-old girl.

== Personal life ==
Conklin married Annie L. Noel on February 2, 2018, at Gettysburg National Military Park.
