= Jonna Mannion =

American reality TV personality (born 1988)

- Born: November 10, 1988 (age 37); Tucson, Arizona
- Occupation: Reality television personality
- Years active: 2002–present

Jonna Danielle Mannion (born November 10, 1988) is an American reality TV personality, best known for her appearances on the MTV reality television series The Real World: Cancun, and the Real World spinoff show The Challenge. She has also appeared on other television shows including the reality competition show Endurance which she won, and the docudrama Rehab: Party at the Hard Rock Hotel on TruTv.

== Personal life ==
Mannion was placed into foster care with a very religious family when she was four years old. She was adopted by another family at the age of nine, who she continued to live with until she was 18. Mannion gave birth to her daughter Naleigh in August 2016. Mannion got married in 2019 and gave birth to her second child, a son, Cal, in 2020.

== Career ==
=== Endurance ===
Mannion first started her television career at the age of thirteen competing on the reality competition show Endurance on Discovery Kids. She and her partner Aaron Thornburg won the competition against six other boy/girl pairs, which earned them a trip to the Amazon, where the reunion was also filmed. Mannion hoped that her reality television debut performance would lead to her getting more time in front of the cameras. Seven years later, this came to fruition.

=== The Real World ===
Mannion was a cast member on MTV's The Real World: Cancun, which aired from June to September 2009. Prior to the filming of The Real World she already knew one of her castmates, Derek Chavez, as they worked together as bartenders in Tempe, Arizona. During filming, recording artists LMFAO were a featured story-line during the season and interacted with the cast during their spring break related job. Mannion would later be featured as an actress/dancer in the music video for the LMFAO song "La La La."

=== Rehab: Party at the Hard Rock Hotel ===
Mannion was featured on the third season of truTV's Rehab: Party at the Hard Rock Hotel as a cocktail waitress in 2010. She would commute from her home in Arizona to Las Vegas every weekend to work at the Rehab pool event highlighted on the show. She only appeared on one season, as the show was canceled at the end of 2010.

=== The Challenge ===
Mannion has been a cast member on five seasons of The Real World spin-off The Challenge. She was a participant on: Rivals, Battle of the Seasons, Rivals II, Free Agents, and Battle of the Exes II. For Mannion's first challenge Rivals, she was paired on a team with Real World: Cancun roommate, Jasmine Reynaud. On her following season, she was on a team with three of her Real World roommates, Reynaud once again, along with Derek Chavez and C.J. Koegel. On Rivals II she was paired with The Real World: Las Vegas (2011) alum Nany González. Battle of the Exes II found Mannion paired with her ex-boyfriend Zach Nichols from The Real World: San Diego (2011) whom she had met on Battle of the Seasons.

Mannion's best finish on The Challenge was on Battle of the Seasons where she and Chavez finished the season in fourth place after Reynaud and Koegel were eliminated earlier in the season.

In 2021, Mannion competed on the first season of the Paramount+ series The Challenge: All Stars, a spin-off of The Challenge featuring past cast members of the show. She finished the season tied for third-place with KellyAnne Judd. In the same year, Mannion returned for season 2 of the All Stars spin-off, which she won alongside The Real World: Philadelphia alumnus MJ Garrett. Mannion returned again in 2022 for the third season, which she also won, making her a two-time champion.

== Filmography ==
Television
Year	Title	Network	Role	Notes
2002	Endurance	Discovery Kids	Contestant (with Aaron Thornburg)	Winners
2009	Engaged and Underage	MTV	Herself - Friend	1 episode
2009	The Real World: Cancun	MTV	Herself	Main cast, 13 episodes
2010	Rehab: Party at the Hard Rock Hotel	truTV	Herself	11 episodes
2011	The Challenge: Rivals	MTV	Contestant (with Jasmine Reynaud)	7th eliminated
2012	The Challenge: Battle of the Seasons	MTV	Contestant (Team Cancun)	11th eliminated
2013	The Challenge: Rivals II	MTV	Contestant (with Nany González)	8th eliminated
2014	The Challenge: Free Agents	MTV	Contestant	7th eliminated
2015	The Challenge: Battle of the Exes II	MTV	Contestant (with Zach Nichols)	8th eliminated
2021	The Challenge: All Stars (season 1)	Paramount+	Contestant	Tied for 3rd place
2021	The Challenge: All Stars (season 2)	Paramount+	Contestant	Winner
2022	The Challenge: All Stars (season 3)	Paramount+	Contestant	Winner
2023	The Challenge: World Championship	Paramount+	Contestant (with Grant Crapp)	Disqualified
2023	The Challenge: USA (season 2)	CBS	Contestant	2nd eliminated
2024	The Challenge 40: Battle of the Eras	MTV	Contestant (Era III)	8th eliminated
2025	The Challenge All Stars: Rivals	MTV	Contestant (with Beth Stolarczyk)	1st eliminated
2025	The Challenge: Vets & New Threats	MTV	Contestant	11th eliminated
Other
Year	Title	Type of Work	Role	Description
2009	"La La La"	Music Video	Love Interest	Music Video for artist LMFAO
2015	Reality Television Awards	Award Show	Presenter	Reality TV Award Show
2016	The Challenge: After Show	TV special	Herself	Special for The Challenge
