= Devyn Simone =

American television host (born 1988)

- Born: Devyn Simone Sims; February 6, 1988 (age 38); Kansas City, Missouri, U.S.
- Other name: Devyn Simone Lock
- Occupations: Television host, matchmaker, media personality
- Years active: 2009–present
- Spouse: Adam Lock (m. 2023)
- Website: devynsimone.com

Devyn Simone (née Sims; born February 6, 1988) is an American television host, matchmaker, and media personality. She first appeared on MTV's The Real World: Brooklyn (2009) and later competed on The Challenge: Battle of the Seasons (2012) and The Challenge: Free Agents (2014), reaching the finals in both seasons. Her hosting credits include TLC's Love at First Swipe, MTV's The Challenge: Aftermath, and The Challenge: Vets & New Threats special. She is Tinder's Resident Relationship Expert. In 2026, she joined the cast of the sixteenth season of The Real Housewives of New York City as an official friend of the housewives.

== Early life and education ==
Simone was born in Kansas City, Missouri. She graduated from Notre Dame de Sion High School and hosted the radio program Generation Rap on KPRS 103.3 prior to her television career.

She was crowned Miss Missouri Teen 2004 and later won the title of Miss American Teen 2005. That year, the Kansas City, Missouri City Council issued a proclamation recognizing her achievement.

== Career ==
=== Television ===
Simone made her television debut on MTV's The Real World: Brooklyn in 2009. During the season, she adopted a Yorkshire Terrier puppy named Brooklyn, which she raised after the show.

She later competed on The Challenge: Battle of the Seasons (2012) and The Challenge: Free Agents (2014), reaching the finals in both seasons.

In 2015, she co-created and co-hosted TLC's Love at First Swipe with Clinton Kelly. She later hosted MTV's The Challenge: Aftermath for several seasons and co-hosted MTV’s Official Challenge Podcast with Tori Deal, Da'Vonne Rogers, and Aneesa Ferreira. The podcast won the Overall Reality Podcast Award at the 11th Annual American Reality Television Awards.

On Free Agents, she staged a mock "funeral" for her wig, a moment later voted as one of the Top 10 Challenge moments of all time in an MTV fan poll.

In 2022, she appeared in the six-part documentary The Challenge: Untold History. Entertainment Weekly ranked her among the top 50 contestants in the history of the franchise.

She has guest-hosted The Wendy Williams Show (2021), appeared on E! Daily Pop, and contributed as a commentator to Access Hollywood. She has also appeared on Today with Hoda & Jenna. In 2023, she worked as a matchmaker on Roku's Match Me in Miami. She has also been featured as a dating expert on Bravo's The Real Housewives of New York City, and Black Ink Crew: Chicago. In 2026, Simone joined the cast of The Real Housewives of New York City for its sixteenth season. She made her official debut in October 2026, appearing as "friend of the housewives".

=== Matchmaking and media work ===
Simone works as a professional matchmaker and dating coach. She has appeared as a relationship expert on programs including Good Morning America, Today (NBC), CNN, CBS News, MSNBC, and Access Hollywood. She has also been a guest expert on Tamron Hall, Sherri, and Daily Blast Live. In 2023, Tinder named her its Resident Relationship Expert.

== Television ==
Year	Title	Role	Notes
2009	The Real World: Brooklyn	Cast member	
2012	The Challenge: Battle of the Seasons	Contestant	Finalist
2014	The Challenge: Free Agents	Contestant	Finalist
2015	Love at First Swipe	Co-host	
2017-2022	The Wendy Williams Show	Guest host	
2021-2022	The Challenge: Aftermath	Host	
2022- present	Today with Hoda & Jenna	Guest	Rebranded as Today with Jenna & Friends (2025–2026) and as Today with Jenna & Sheinelle starting in 2026
2022	The Challenge: Untold History	Herself	Documentary series
2022	Black Ink Crew: Chicago	Dating expert	
2023	Match Me in Miami	Matchmaker	Roku series
2025	The Challenge: Vets & New Threats	Host	Season 41 reunion
2021, 2026	The Real Housewives of New York City	Herself	Guest: Season 13; Friend of the housewives: Season 16

== Personal life ==
Simone lives in New York City. In July 2022, Simone announced her engagement to Adam Lock. The couple married on June 24, 2023, in Kansas City, Missouri, in a ceremony officiated by television personality Clinton Kelly.
