= The Challenge: Rivals =

21st season of the reality television series

Coordinates: 09°12′27″N 83°48′19″W

Rivals
- Season 21
- Presented by: T. J. Lavin
- No. of contestants: 29
- Winners: Johnny Devenanzio; Tyler Duckworth; Evelyn Smith; Paula Meronek
- Location: Dominical, Costa Rica; Buenos Aires & Bariloche, Argentina
- No. of episodes: 12 (Special & Reunion Included)

Release
- Original network: MTV
- Original release: June 22 – September 7, 2011

Season chronology
- ← Previous; Cutthroat Next → Battle of the Exes

The Challenge: Rivals is the 21st season of the MTV reality game show, The Challenge. Rivals takes place in Costa Rica, Argentina, and Patagonia. The season featured cast members from The Real World and The Challenge. Rivals marked the first season of The Challenge not to include any cast members from Road Rules.

The season featured a format in which players were teamed with their arch enemies from past seasons of The Real World and The Challenge. The format similar to one suggested the year prior by a reader to the Bill Simmons mailbag on ESPN.com. The season premiered on June 22, 2011, and concluded with the "S#!% They Should Have Shown" special on September 7, 2011.

This is the first edition of the Rivals series, with Rivals II, Rivals III, and The Challenge All Stars: Rivals following in 2013, 2016, and 2025, respectively.

== Format ==
The cast of the twenty-first season of The Challenge, excluding Adam Royer and Michael Ross

This season of The Challenge featured a brand new format, consisting of 14 same-gender teams — seven male and seven female. Each team will consist of players who will be paired with their "worst enemies," whom they have engaged in bitter feuds, fights and rivalries with in previous Real World and/or Challenge seasons. This format was inspired by ESPN columnist Bill Simmons in a mailbag email by someone known as "B.J. from Brooklyn" (where it was dubbed "Mortal Enemies" but maintained the premise) Simmons and Dave Jacoby further discussed this idea on the B.S. Report, Simmons' podcast.

Each team participates in numerous challenges (sometimes called "missions"), which are followed by an elimination round called "The Jungle." Each challenge is alternatively designated as either a male or a female challenge day. The winning team of the gender not designated for the Jungle is awarded $2,000. The winning team whose gender is designated for elimination wins immunity from the Jungle, while the team that finishes last is automatically sent to the Jungle. An open deliberation and vote then held among the players to determine which team of the same gender will face the last-place finisher in the Jungle. The team who wins the elimination round returns to the game and has a shot at a $300,000 prize, while the losing team is eliminated from the game.

At the end of the season, six teams compete in the final challenge. The first-place male and female teams win $100,000 apiece, second-place wins $50,000 and the third-place finishers go home empty-handed.

== Contestants ==
Male Contestants	Original season	Finish
Johnny Devenanzio	The Real World: Key West	Winner
Tyler Duckworth	The Real World: Key West	Winner
Kenny Santucci	Real World/Road Rules Challenge: Fresh Meat	Runner-up
Wes Bergmann	The Real World: Austin	Runner-up
Leroy Garrett	The Real World: Las Vegas (2011)	Third place (Note: Jenn & Mandi and Leroy & Michael were both disqualified during the final challenge, and finished in third by default. Jenn & Mandi were disqualified on day 1, after taking too long to complete the "Pile Up" and "Re-creation Campsite" checkpoints. When daylight ran out, producers informed Jenn & Mandi that advancing to the "Final Feast" checkpoint would be too dangerous to attempt in the dark. (It has been implied, though, at the reunion, that Jenn & Mandi were actually incapable of completing the tent puzzle and were told to move on simply for footage purposes.) Leroy & Michael were disqualified on day 2, after they decided that Michael was too worn out to climb the mountain without injuring himself.)
Michael Ross	The Real World: Las Vegas (2011)	Third place
Adam King	The Real World: Paris	Episode 8/9
Chris "CT" Tamburello	The Real World: Paris	Episode 8/9
Evan Starkman	Real World/Road Rules Challenge: Fresh Meat	Episode 6
Nehemiah Clark	The Real World: Austin	Episode 6
Brandon Nelson	The Challenge: Fresh Meat II	Episode 4
Ty Ruff	The Real World: D.C.	Episode 4
Davis Mallory	The Real World: Denver	Episode 2
Tyrie Ballard	The Real World: Denver	Episode 2
Adam Royer	The Real World: Las Vegas (2011)	Episode 1 (Note: Leroy's original partner, Adam R., was sent home prior to the first Jungle for punching Ty. His Real World: Las Vegas (2011) roommate, Michael Ross, was brought in as Leroy's replacement partner. Ironically, due to the theme of Rivals, Leroy & Michael were very good friends on their original season. The "High Dive" challenge was won by the team of Adam R. & Leroy, prior to Adam's disqualification.)

Female contestants	Original season	Finish
Evelyn Smith	Real World/Road Rules Challenge: Fresh Meat	Winner
Paula Meronek	The Real World: Key West	Winner
Cara Maria Sorbello	The Challenge: Fresh Meat II	Runner-up
Laurel Stucky	The Challenge: Fresh Meat II	Runner-up
Jenn Grijalva	The Real World: Denver	Third place
Mandi Moyer	The Challenge: Fresh Meat II	Third place
Jasmine Reynaud	The Real World: Cancun	Episode 7
Jonna Mannion	The Real World: Cancun	Episode 7
Katelynn Bald	The Real World: Brooklyn	Episode 5
Sarah Rice	The Real World: Brooklyn	Episode 5
Camila Nakagawa	Spring Break Challenge	Episode 3
Theresa Gonzalez	The Challenge: Fresh Meat II	Episode 3
Aneesa Ferreira	The Real World: Chicago	Episode 1
Robin Hibbard	The Real World: San Diego (2004)	Episode 1

=== Teams ===
Team	Partner 1	Partner 2
Adam K. & CT	Adam King	Chris "CT" Tamburello
Aneesa & Robin	Aneesa Ferreira	Robin Hibbard
Brandon & Ty	Brandon Nelson	Ty Ruff
Camila & Theresa	Camila Nakagawa	Theresa Gonzalez
Cara Maria & Laurel	Cara Maria Sorbello	Laurel Stucky
Davis & Tyrie	Davis Mallory	Tyrie Ballard
Evan & Nehemiah	Evan Starkman	Nehemiah Clark
Evelyn & Paula	Evelyn Smith	Paula Meronek
Jasmine & Jonna	Jasmine Reynaud	Jonna Mannion
Jenn & Mandi	Jenn Grijalva	Mandi Moyer
Johnny & Tyler	Johnny Devenanzio	Tyler Duckworth
Katelynn & Sarah	Katelynn Cusanelli	Sarah Rice
Kenny & Wes	Kenny Santucci	Wes Bergmann
Leroy & Michael	Leroy Garrett	Michael Ross

=== Pre-season rivalry backgrounds ===
Rivals combines individuals who have had acrimonious or at least strained relations or interactions prior to the season. The following lists all the teams on Rivals, and explains why they've been paired and dubbed as "rivals." Each of the teams' history of animosity and/or open expressions of hostility are detailed.

==== Male teams ====
- Adam K. & CT: The bad blood between the two dates back to The Real World: Paris, with CT becoming confrontational toward Adam numerous times. During the most infamous occasion, CT pushed Adam around in the Parisian streets, telling him "don't pretend like you got my back dog...I'll fucking work you." On The Gauntlet III, Adam believed that CT's playful nature with Rookie Frank Roessler was getting out of hand and tried to break it up. This led to CT telling Adam he was doing the same thing he did in Paris, and poured a beer on his head. The years of tension between the two finally came to a head on The Duel II, when they engaged in a brawl that got them both removed from the show before any challenges took place.
- Adam R. & Leroy: The tension between Adam & Leroy developed during their original season on The Real World: Las Vegas, when Leroy became disgusted by Adam's obnoxious behavior within their Hard Rock Hotel and Casino suite and the accompanying Vanity nightclub. Adam became even more disorderly when he got drunk, and Leroy made his feelings clear to the rest of the roommates, with Adam taking great offense to that.
  - Leroy & Michael: Leroy and Michael actually formed a good friendship on The Real World: Las Vegas, their partnership simply resulted from Adam Royer's disqualification and Michael being an available replacement.
- Brandon & Ty: The two engaged in a heated squabble during Cutthroat and they later faced off in a Gulag, in which Brandon won by default after an exhausted Ty failed to get up.
- Davis & Tyrie: During The Real World: Denver, the two engaged in a heated verbal scuffle, which included Davis drunkenly using a racial epithet toward Tyrie and producers having to separate the two in order to keep the fight from escalating. The two won the Best Fight award at the Real World Awards Bash in 2008.
- Evan & Nehemiah: The animosity between the two began on The Duel II, after Nehemiah stated that he does not like how Evan plays the game. Nehemiah made his distaste towards Evan known to fellow cast member Brad Fiorenza after his friend Davis Mallory was eliminated by Evan. Nehemiah then called out Evan for a Duel in the following episode, which an enraged Evan subsequently won, sending Nehemiah home.
- Johnny & Tyler: Their feud dates back to the first episode of The Duel, after Tyler called out his own Real World: Key West roommate Johnny to the first male Duel, sending him home. Johnny would then exact revenge during The Gauntlet III by sending Tyler in a Gauntlet against Frank Roessler, where Tyler was eliminated. The two were set to face against each other in a Gulag elimination during Cutthroat, but a twist made them both face CT instead, and Johnny was ultimately eliminated. On the Cutthroat reunion, when asked if CT was not involved, Johnny denied that the results would have been the same, to which Tyler immediately became angry and said if he could hold CT off for 40 minutes, he could have easily tossed Johnny around.
- Kenny & Wes: The two were friends on Fresh Meat and The Duel. The conflict between the two started after Kenny became involved in a relationship with Johanna Botta on The Island, who was Wes' roommate and romantic interest on The Real World: Austin. Their rivalry culminated in The Ruins, when the two became teammates on the Champions team. Wes admitted that the "love pentagon" situation was one of the main reasons he came out of Challenge retirement. Kenny, along with his allies Evan and Johnny, did everything in his power to remove Wes from the team, which he ultimately did after sending Wes into The Ruins three times. Their hatred re-kindled during their next challenge, (Fresh Meat II), and although they appeared to extinguish their animosity toward each other during The Ruins reunion, which was filmed after the filming of Fresh Meat II, it returned during the Fresh Meat II reunion, which was filmed after both seasons had aired and all had the opportunity to view what transpired. Their rivalry was the driving force behind almost all of the season's drama.

==== Female teams ====
- Aneesa & Robin: During The Duel, a drunk Robin made several offensive remarks regarding Aneesa's sexual orientation, race and origins, which drew Aneesa's wrath. Aneesa stated that this was not the first time Robin had made remarks about Aneesa's life, and Aneesa later chose Robin to go into the Duel and sent her home.
- Camila & Theresa: Camila was excoriated by Theresa in Cutthroat, after Theresa claimed that Camila had stole Ty's sweatpants and Jenn's hat, causing Camila to break down.
- Cara Maria & Laurel: Tension between the two began on Fresh Meat II when Laurel voted Cara Maria into Exile in the first week, which Cara Maria lost. Later on Cutthroat, Laurel accused Cara Maria of not being a worthy team member. Laurel continued to harbor hatred towards her, stating that she did not want to share any prize money with her and insinuated that Cara Maria got a "free ride" to the end because she had been romantically involved with Abram Boise.
- Evelyn & Paula: Tension between the two occurred on The Island, when Evelyn was constantly ridiculed by Paula's alliance members, Johnny and Kenny. Paula was then double crossed by Evelyn after she won the final face-off and made a deal with Johnny and Kenny that she would not take their keys (and consequently eliminate them from the game) in a bid to join their boat and win the final challenge. In turn, Paula was then shafted by her own friends and left behind by the group, who would go on to win the final challenge without her. Evelyn and Paula next met up on Fresh Meat II. Upon entering the house Paula expressed that she did not want Evelyn there, as she is a top competitor. The two girls then became the right hand women to the two house alliance leaders: Kenny and Wes. The two would again face each other in an Exile elimination which would tip the balance of power in the house based on the outcome. Evelyn was again victorious and Paula was eliminated.
- Jasmine & Jonna: The two were involved in a love triangle during their original season of The Real World: Cancun, when Jonna cheated on her boyfriend from home and became close to Jasmine's love interest, drawing jealousy from Jasmine.
- Jenn & Mandi: The two were involved in a scuffle during Fresh Meat II, after Mandi questioned Jenn's voting strategy. The two women got into a huge argument which led to Mandi calling Jenn a "dumb bitch". Jenn reacted by shoving Mandi off a table, throwing a drink at her, and almost punching her, only to have a barrage of insults follow the attack.
- Katelynn & Sarah: The two were friends on The Real World: Brooklyn, but their friendship soured during Fresh Meat II, when Katelynn voted Sarah for the Exile, after vowing not to. Sarah confronted Katelynn over this and revealed that her own mother warned her not to trust Katelynn. Sarah and Vinny would then be eliminated in the Exile by Kenny and Laurel.

== Gameplay ==
=== Challenge games ===
- High Dive: Players run and jump off a platform that is suspended 150 feet above a waterfall. Players have to hold their partner's hands, then run together, and jump off the platform before a white line and clear as many hash marks as possible. A team is disqualified if one or both players step on the white line that is located inches from the end of the platform. The team that clears the most hash marks in the shortest amount of time wins.
  - Winners: Adam R. & Leroy and Jasmine & Jonna
- Car Crusher: Teams smash cars using a Caterpillar, and have to flatten a car to where the team can push the car with the bucket to their goal. One player has to sit on their partner's lap to steer, while the other operates the heavy machinery. A team is disqualified if they pick up their car with the bucket, maneuver outside of the course boundary or knock over the crossbar at their goal with the bucket or any piece of a smashed car. The team that slides their smashed car through their goal in the fastest time without disqualifying wins.
  - Winners: Adam K. & CT and Evelyn & Paula
- Sync or Swim: Teams start inside of a large container filled with 1,000 pounds of sand that is hanging from a platform. When players from each team begin shoveling out the sand, their container rises to a platform, where each player then has to jump to a zip line and ride it to the water, where the team that swims fastest to the finish line wins. A team is disqualified is any player pulls the zip line toward them at the top of the platform instead of jumping from the platform toward the zip line.
  - Winners: Adam K. & CT and Evelyn & Paula
- Hammock Crawl: Teams have to move from one end of a platform to the other within a 15-minute time limit, only using hammocks that are hanging from the bottom of the platform. Teams are only allowed to touch two hammocks at any time, and must be in the same hammock before advancing to the next hammock. A team is disqualified if more than two hammocks are being touched at any time, or if one or both partners falls into the water. The team that makes it from one end of the platform to the other in the fastest time without disqualifying wins.
  - Winners: Johnny & Tyler (Note: Cara Maria & Laurel were the only two women to complete the "Hammock Crawl" challenge, but were disqualified for going over the 15-minute time limit. Therefore, no female team won any money.)
- Against the Current: Teams have to paddle upstream in a kayak until the current pushes them out of the zone, after which teams have to paddle the opposite direction to the finish line. If one player falls out of a kayak, that team has 30 seconds to push the kayak past the finish line in order to avoid disqualification. The team with the lowest time differential of paddling upstream and subsequent paddling in the reverse direction to the finish line wins.
  - Winners: Johnny & Tyler and Jenn & Mandi
- Catch & Release: One player from each team is suspended 30 feet above water, while the other partner has to run and jump on a platform toward their partner, and have their momentum carried them (via a zip line) toward the water. Once a team has determined that they have gone far enough, they can hit their release harness, which drops them into the water. The teams then have to swim toward a red buoy, which indicates the finish line.
  - Winners: Cara Maria & Laurel and Kenny & Wes
- Sawed Off: One player from each team is hanging from ropes, from a platform 30 feet above water. Their partners have to use a high-powered fire hose to spray at the ropes, and with the force of the water, push the ropes toward an arrowhead blade until each rope slices on the blades, dropping their teammates into the water. A team is disqualified if their partner doesn't drop into the water within 20 minutes. The team with the fastest time wins, as well as automatic bid to the final challenge for the girls.
  - Winners: Evelyn & Paula and Johnny & Tyler
- Bombs Away: One player is strapped to the bottom of a helicopter, while their teammate has to climb up a 20-foot rope and pull a rip cord, which will release that player into the water. Once the player climbing up a rope drops their teammate into the water, that player has launch into the water, which will stop the team time, in which the fastest time will determine the winner, as well as an automatic bid in the finals for the guys. A team is disqualified if the player climbing up the rope drops into the water before their opponent.
  - Winners: Evelyn & Paula and Leroy & Michael

=== Jungle games ===
- Hands On: Each player starts on a platform, leaning into their own partner. When T. J. Lavin pulls a lever, the platforms will slowly separate until it becomes difficult to keep balance. The team that falls into a mud pit first loses.
  - Played by: Evelyn & Paula vs. Aneesa & Robin
- Blast Off: Players are attached to their partners, matched up two-on-two in football helmets and shoulder pads against their opponents in a circle, and have to tackle their opponent out of the circle. The first team to tackle their opponent out of the circle three times wins.
  - Played by: Davis & Tyrie vs. Kenny & Wes and Cara Maria & Laurel vs. Jasmine & Jonna
- Door Jam: A wall is placed in between two teams. The wall has many doors that rotate to either side. Once the door is rotated to the "Rivals" logo, the door is claimed by that team at the end of the challenge. However, each team has the chance to turn the logo back to their side. The team with more doors with the "Rivals" logo facing them after five minutes wins.
  - Played by: Camila & Theresa vs. Cara Maria & Laurel
- Going Up: Each player runs and jumps into a water pit, and has to climb up their assigned rope to the top to ring a bell. If a tie occurs with one player from each team winning, then those two players will face off in a one-on-one elimination, with the player who makes it to the top first winning the Jungle for their team.
  - Played by: Brandon & Ty vs. Kenny & Wes
- Unburied: One player is taken away ahead of time and locked in a coffin, buried under a pile of hay. The other partner must dig through the hay to find their partner, but they don't know which pile contains their partner. After they successfully get their partner out, they must solve a complicated brain-teaser puzzle. The first team to solve the puzzle will win the Jungle.
  - Played by: Jasmine & Jonna vs. Katelynn & Sarah
- Rail Slide: Players are hanging from a pipe 25 feet above the ground, and have to slide their pipe together from one side of an obstacle course to the other. The first team to slide their pipe to the end of the obstacle course wins.
  - Played by: Adam K. & CT vs. Evan & Nehemiah
- T-Bone: Players run up and down, through intersecting half-pipes, and have to transfer colored balls to their partner's ball rack. The first team to transfer five balls to their partner's ball rack wins.
  - Played by: Adam K. & CT vs. Johnny & Tyler

=== Final challenge ===
The first part of the final challenge begins with each team being dragged 200 yards by a rope under water, from a boat, and once each team releases themselves from the boat, they have to swim to their designated kayaks, and paddle their way three miles to the end of the river. Once each team has changed into their team uniforms, they arrive at their first checkpoint, "Pet Rock," in they have to carry a heavy rock and chain. Once teams arrive at a "Memories" campsite, they have to memorize the details and placement of each item present at the example campsite for a later checkpoint. After studying the details of the campsite, each team advances to a "Pile Up" checkpoint, which involves shoveling mounds of dirt into a wheelbarrow, and transferring the dirt into their designated dumpzone. Teams cannot advance until their designated dumpzone is completely filled with dirt. Each team then arrives at a "Re-creation Campsite," in which each team has to memorize the details from the earlier example campsite. If a team copies each detail of the aforementioned campsite correctly, they can advance to the next checkpoint, if not, they have to return to the original example campsite. The next checkpoint is "Final Feast," in which each team has to eat every item on their plate, but results in each player vomiting. After the Final Feast, each team hikes up a mountain before sunset, and at nightfall, arrives at a "Sleep or Stand" checkpoint, in which one player can sleep while their partner has to balance on a rock. If a player falls off the rock, they have to wake their sleeping partner and trade places with their partner. The second part of the final challenge begins in the morning, with each team racing to the top of a mountain. The order of the teams starting up the mountain is determined by each teams' arrival at the "Stand or Sleep" checkpoint—first place gets a two-minute head-start, while second place gets a one-minute head-start. Each team hikes to the top of a mountain, and has to go on a search & rescue, using avalanche beacons which are programmed to locate the keys needed to unlock the trophies at the finish line.

- Winners: Evelyn & Paula and Johnny & Tyler
- Second place: Cara Maria & Laurel and Kenny & Wes
- Third place: Jenn & Mandi and Leroy & Michael

== Game summary ==
Episode		Gender	Winners		Jungle contestants		Jungle game	Jungle outcome	
#	Challenge	Gender	Won $2,000	Safety	Last-place	Voted in	Jungle game	Winners	Eliminated
1	High Dive	Female	Adam R. & Leroy	Jasmine & Jonna	Evelyn & Paula	Aneesa & Robin	Hands On	Evelyn & Paula	Aneesa & Robin
2	Car Crusher	Male	Evelyn & Paula	Adam K. & CT	Kenny & Wes	Davis & Tyrie	Blast Off	Kenny & Wes	Davis & Tyrie
3	Sync or Swim	Female	Adam K. & CT	Evelyn & Paula	Cara Maria & Laurel	Camila & Theresa	Door Jam	Cara Maria & Laurel	Camila & Theresa
4	Hammock Crawl	Male	—N/a	Johnny & Tyler	Kenny & Wes	Brandon & Ty	Going Up	Kenny & Wes	Brandon & Ty
5	Against the Current	Female	Johnny & Tyler	Jenn & Mandi	Katelynn & Sarah	Jasmine & Jonna	Unburied	Jasmine & Jonna	Katelynn & Sarah
6	Catch & Release	Male	Cara Maria & Laurel	Kenny & Wes	Evan & Nehemiah	Adam K. & CT	Rail Slide	Adam K. & CT	Evan & Nehemiah
7	Sawed Off	Female	Johnny & Tyler	Evelyn & Paula	Cara Maria & Laurel	Jasmine & Jonna	Blast Off	Cara Maria & Laurel	Jasmine & Jonna
8/9	Bombs Away	Male	Evelyn & Paula	Leroy & Michael	Adam K. & CT	Johnny & Tyler	T-Bone	Johnny & Tyler	Adam K. & CT
9/10	Final Challenge		Evelyn & Paula		2nd place: Cara Maria & Laurel, 3rd place: Jenn & Mandi				
9/10	Final Challenge		Johnny & Tyler		2nd place: Kenny & Wes, 3rd place: Leroy & Michael				

=== Elimination progress ===
Teams	Challenges								
Teams	1	2	3	4	5	6	7	8/9	Finale
Johnny & Tyler	SAFE	SAFE	SAFE	WIN	WON	SAFE	WON	ELIM	WINNERS
Evelyn & Paula	ELIM	WON	WIN	SAFE	SAFE	SAFE	WIN	WON	WINNERS
Kenny & Wes	SAFE	ELIM	SAFE	ELIM	SAFE	WIN	SAFE	SAFE	SECOND
Cara Maria & Laurel	SAFE	SAFE	ELIM	SAFE	SAFE	WON	ELIM	SAFE	SECOND
Leroy & Michael	—N/a	SAFE	SAFE	SAFE	SAFE	SAFE	SAFE	WIN	THIRD
Jenn & Mandi	SAFE	SAFE	SAFE	SAFE	WIN	SAFE	SAFE	SAFE	THIRD
Adam K. & CT	SAFE	WIN	WON	SAFE	SAFE	ELIM	SAFE	OUT	
Jasmine & Jonna	WIN	SAFE	SAFE	SAFE	ELIM	SAFE	OUT		
Evan & Nehemiah	SAFE	SAFE	SAFE	SAFE	SAFE	OUT			
Katelynn & Sarah	SAFE	SAFE	SAFE	SAFE	OUT				
Brandon & Ty	SAFE	SAFE	SAFE	OUT					
Camila & Theresa	SAFE	SAFE	OUT						
Davis & Tyrie	SAFE	OUT							
Aneesa & Robin	OUT								
Adam R. & Leroy	DQ								

Competition
The team won the competition
The team did not win the final challenge
The team could not complete the final challenge and was disqualified
The team won the mission, and was safe from the Jungle
The team won the mission and $2,000
The team was not selected for the Jungle
The team won in the Jungle
The team lost in the Jungle and was eliminated
The team won the mission and $2,000, one team member was later disqualified from the competition, and his/her partner later received a replacement teammate

== Team selections ==
Sawed Off (Ep. 7)
Team Kenny & Wes	Team Cara Maria & Laurel
Kenny & Wes	Cara Maria & Laurel
Evelyn & Paula	Adam K. & CT
Johnny & Tyler	Jenn & Mandi
Jasmine & Jonna	Leroy & Michael

== Episodes ==
No. overall	No. in season	Title	Original release date	US viewers (millions)
261	1	"Welcome to the Jungle"	June 22, 2011	1.88
262	2	"Through the Looking Glass"	June 29, 2011	1.36
263	3	"Underdog Day Afternoon"	July 6, 2011	1.66
264	4	"D-Day"	July 13, 2011	1.62
265	5	"Ill-Communication"	July 20, 2011	1.66
266	6	"Blowup"	July 27, 2011	1.99
267	7	"Blood on the Dance Floor"	August 3, 2011	1.59
268	8	"Cry For Me, Argentina"	August 10, 2011	2.06
269	9	"The Storm Before the Storm"	August 17, 2011	1.99
270	10	"At the End of the World"	August 24, 2011	2.37

=== Reunion special ===
The Challenge: Rivals Reunion was aired on August 31, 2011, and was hosted by Maria Menounos. The cast members who attended the reunion were: Johnny Bananas, Tyler, Evelyn, Paula, Kenny, Wes, Cara Maria, Laurel, Leroy, Mike, Jenn, Mandi, Adam and CT.
