= List of The Challenge (TV series) episodes =

The Challenge is a reality competition show on MTV that is a spin-off of two of the network's reality shows: The Real World and Road Rules. The series premiered on April 20, 1998, and was originally titled Road Rules: All Stars. It was renamed Real World/Road Rules Challenge on the second season, then later abridged to simply The Challenge by the show's 19th season.

== Series overview ==
| Season | Title | Format | Location | Episodes | Originally released | | | Champion(s) |
| Season | Title | Format | Location | Episodes | First released | Last released | Network | Champion(s) |
|---|---|---|---|---|---|---|---|---|
| 1 | Road Rules: All Stars | 1 team of 5 | Various (Road trip) | 5 | April 20, 1998 | May 18, 1998 | MTV | Cynthia Roberts, Eric Nies, Jon Brennan, Rachel Campos & Sean Duffy |
| 2 | Real World/Road Rules Challenge | 2 teams of 6 | Various (Road trip) | 6 | November 9, 1999 | December 14, 1999 | MTV | Anne Wharton, Kalle Dedolph, Kefla Hare, Mark Long, Noah Rickun & Roni Martin |
| 3 | Challenge 2000 | 2 teams of 6 | Various (Road trip) | 11 | January 17, 2000 | April 3, 2000 | MTV | Carlos "Los" Jackson, Dan Setzler, Holly Shand, Piggy Thomas, Veronica Portillo & Yes Duffy |
| 4 | Extreme Challenge | 2 teams of 6 | Various (Road trip) | 17 | January 9, 2001 | May 1, 2001 | MTV | Dan Renzi, Jamie Murray, Julie Stoffer, Kameelah Phillips, Rebecca Lord & Syrus Yarbrough |
| 5 | Battle of the Seasons | 2 teams of 8 pairs | Cabo San Lucas, Mexico | 15 | February 4, 2002 | May 20, 2002 | MTV | Danny Roberts & Kelley Limp, Mike Mizanin & Coral Smith; Sean Duffy & Elka Walker |
| 6 | Battle of the Sexes | 2 teams of 18 | Montego Bay, Jamaica | 18 | January 6, 2003 | May 5, 2003 | MTV | Colin Mortensen, Jamie Murray & Mark Long |
| 7 | The Gauntlet | 2 teams of 14 | Telluride, Colorado | 16 | September 29, 2003 | January 26, 2004 | MTV | Adam Larson, Cara Zavaleta, Darrell Taylor, Dave Giuntoli, Rachel Robinson, Roni Martin, Sarah Greyson, Theo Vonkurnatowski & Veronica Portillo |
| 8 | The Inferno | 2 teams of 10 | Acapulco, Mexico | 19 | February 2, 2004 | May 31, 2004 | MTV | Abram Boise, Christena Pyle, Darrell Taylor, Holly Shand, Katie Doyle, Kendal Sheppard, Timmy Beggy & Veronica Portillo |
| 9 | Battle of the Sexes 2 | 2 teams of 18 | Santa Fe, New Mexico | 17 | October 4, 2004 | January 31, 2005 | MTV | Dan Setzler, Eric Nies & Theo Vonkurnatowski |
| 10 | The Inferno II | 2 teams of 10 | Manzanillo, Mexico | 16 | March 7, 2005 | June 20, 2005 | MTV | Darrell Taylor, Jamie Chung, Landon Lueck & Mike Mizanin |
| 11 | The Gauntlet 2 | 2 teams of 16 | Tobago, Trinidad and Tobago | 18 | December 5, 2005 | March 27, 2006 | MTV | Alton Williams, Ibis Nieves, Jamie Murray, Jodi Weatherton, Kina Dean, Landon Lueck, MJ Garrett, Randy Barry & Susie Meister |
| 12 | Fresh Meat | 12 pairs | Myocum, Australia | 16 | May 29, 2006 | September 11, 2006 | MTV | Darrell Taylor & Aviv Melmed |
| 13 | The Duel | Individual | Armação dos Búzios, Brazil | 17 | October 12, 2006 | January 18, 2007 | MTV | Wes Bergmann and Jodi Weatherton |
| 14 | The Inferno 3 | 2 teams of 10 | Somerset West, South Africa | 16 | April 10, 2007 | July 3, 2007 | MTV | Abram Boise, Derrick Kosinski, Evelyn Smith, Janelle Casanave, Kenny Santucci & Tonya Cooley |
| 15 | The Gauntlet III | 2 teams of 16 | Puerto Vallarta, Mexico | 10 | January 23, 2008 | March 26, 2008 | MTV | Frank Roessler, Jillian Zoboroski, Johanna Botta, Nehemiah Clark, Rachel Moyal & Tori Hall |
| 16 | The Island | Individual → 2 teams of 4 | Colón Island, Panama | 9 | September 10, 2008 | November 5, 2008 | MTV | Derrick Kosinski, Evelyn Smith, Johnny Devenanzio & Kenny Santucci |
| 17 | The Duel II | Individual | Queenstown, New Zealand | 10 | April 8, 2009 | June 10, 2009 | MTV | Evan Starkman and Rachel Robinson |
| 18 | The Ruins | 2 teams of 14 | Phuket, Thailand | 10 | September 30, 2009 | December 9, 2009 | MTV | Derrick Kosinski, Evan Starkman, Johnny Devenanzio, Kenny Santucci & Susie Meister |
| 19 | Fresh Meat II | 13 pairs | Whistler, British Columbia, Canada | 10 | April 7, 2010 | June 9, 2010 | MTV | Landon Lueck & Carley Johnson |
| 20 | Cutthroat | 3 teams of 10 | Prague, Czech Republic | 10 | October 6, 2010 | December 15, 2010 | MTV | Brad Fiorenza, Dunbar Merrill, Tori Hall & Tyler Duckworth |
| 21 | Rivals | 14 pairs | Dominical, Costa Rica → Buenos Aires & Bariloche, Argentina | 10 | June 22, 2011 | August 24, 2011 | MTV | Johnny Devenanzio & Tyler Duckworth and Evelyn Smith & Paula Meronek |
| 22 | Battle of the Exes | 13 pairs | Sosúa, Dominican Republic → Reykjavík, Iceland | 10 | January 25, 2012 | March 28, 2012 | MTV | Johnny Devenanzio & Camila Nakagawa |
| 23 | Battle of the Seasons | 8 teams of 4 | Bodrum, Turkey → Swakopmund & Windhoek, Namibia | 12 | September 19, 2012 | December 19, 2012 | MTV | Ashley Kelsey, Frank Sweeney, Sam McGinn & Zach Nichols |
| 24 | Rivals II | 16 pairs | Phuket, Thailand | 12 | July 10, 2013 | September 25, 2013 | MTV | Chris "CT" Tamburello & Wes Bergmann and Emily Schromm & Paula Meronek |
| 25 | Free Agents | Individual (Pairs/Teams) | Punta del Este, Uruguay → Pucón, Chile | 12 | April 10, 2014 | June 26, 2014 | MTV | Johnny "Bananas" Devenanzio and Laurel Stucky |
| 26 | Battle of the Exes II | 13 pairs | Pedasí, Panama → Ørsta, Norway | 12 | January 6, 2015 | March 24, 2015 | MTV | Jordan Wiseley & Sarah Rice |
| 27 | Battle of the Bloodlines | 14 pairs → 2 teams of 12 → 5 pairs | Bodrum, Turkey → Berlin, Germany | 13 | December 2, 2015 | February 17, 2016 | MTV | Cara Maria Sorbello & Jamie Banks |
| 28 | Rivals III | 13 pairs | Huatulco, Mexico → Mendoza, Argentina | 14 | May 4, 2016 | August 3, 2016 | MTV | Johnny "Bananas" Devenanzio & Sarah Rice |
| 29 | Invasion of the Champions | Individual → 2 teams → Individual | Krabi, Thailand | 14 | February 7, 2017 | May 9, 2017 | MTV | Chris "CT" Tamburello and Ashley Mitchell |
| 30 | XXX: Dirty 30 | Individual (Pairs/Teams) | Cartagena, Colombia → Salta, Argentina | 17 | July 18, 2017 | November 7, 2017 | MTV | Jordan Wiseley and Camila Nakagawa |
| 31 | Vendettas | Individual (Teams) | Gibraltar, BOT & Marbella, Spain → Prague, Czech Republic | 14 | January 2, 2018 | April 3, 2018 | MTV | Cara Maria Sorbello |
| 32 | Final Reckoning | 17 pairs | Hermanus, South Africa | 20 | July 10, 2018 | November 20, 2018 | MTV | Ashley Mitchell & Hunter Barfield |
| 33 | War of the Worlds | 16 pairs → Individual | Swakopmund, Namibia | 16 | February 6, 2019 | May 22, 2019 | MTV | Turabi "Turbo" Çamkıran |
| 34 | War of the Worlds 2 | 2 teams of 16 | Chiang Mai and Phuket, Thailand | 16 | August 28, 2019 | December 11, 2019 | MTV | Chris "CT" Tamburello, Dee Nguyen, Jordan Wiseley & Rogan O'Connor |
| 35 | Total Madness | Individual (Pairs/Teams) | Prague, Czech Republic → Central Eastern Alps, Austria | 16 | April 1, 2020 | July 15, 2020 | MTV | Jenny West and Johnny "Bananas" Devenanzio |
| 36 | Double Agents | 15 pairs | Reykjavík, Iceland | 19 | December 9, 2020 | April 21, 2021 | MTV | Amber Borzotra & Chris "CT" Tamburello |
| 37 | Spies, Lies & Allies | 17 pairs → 3 teams of 6 → Individual→ 3 pairs | Vrsar, Croatia | 19 | August 11, 2021 | December 15, 2021 | MTV | Chris "CT" Tamburello & Kaycee Clark |
| 38 | Ride or Dies | 17 pairs → 2 teams of 8 →7 pairs | Buenos Aires, Argentina | 19 | October 12, 2022 | February 15, 2023 | MTV | Devin Walker-Molaghan & Tori Deal |
| 39 | Battle for a New Champion | Individual (Pairs/Teams) | Pula, Croatia | 19 | October 25, 2023 | February 21, 2024 | MTV | Emanuel Neagu |
| 40 | 40: Battle of the Eras | 4 teams of 10 → Individual | Ho Chi Minh City, Vietnam → Palawan, Philippines | 19 | August 14, 2024 | January 8, 2025 | MTV | Jenny West, Jordan Wiseley and Rachel Robinson |
| 41 | Vets & New Threats | 16 pairs | Santiago & Andes Mountains, Chile | 19 | July 30, 2025 | December 3, 2025 | MTV | Olivia Kaiser & Yeremi Hykel |
| 42 | Cutthroat | 3 teams of 8 → 2 teams of 6 | Bangkok & Chonburi, Thailand | 14 | August 5, 2026 | October 28, 2026 | Paramount+ | Johnny "Bananas" Devenanzio, Chris "CT" Tamburello, Michele Fitzgerald, Tori Deal & Will Gagnon |
