= List of The Challenge (TV series) episodes (seasons 16–30) =

Airings of the MTV reality series from 2008 to 2017

The Challenge is a reality competition show on MTV that is a spin-off of two of the network's reality shows: The Real World and Road Rules. The series premiered on April 20, 1998, and was originally titled Road Rules: All Stars. It was renamed Real World/Road Rules Challenge on the second season, then later abridged to simply The Challenge by the show's 19th season.

== Series overview ==
Season	Title/Subtitle	Format	Episodes	Originally released			Champion(s)
Season	Title/Subtitle	Format	Episodes	First released	Last released	Network	Champion(s)
1	Road Rules: All Stars	1 team of 5	5	April 20, 1998	May 18, 1998	MTV	Cynthia Roberts, Eric Nies, Jon Brennan, Rachel Campos & Sean Duffy
2	Real World/Road Rules Challenge	2 teams of 6	6	November 9, 1999	December 14, 1999	MTV	Anne Wharton, Kalle Dedolph, Kefla Hare, Mark Long, Noah Rickun & Roni Martin
3	Challenge 2000	2 teams of 6	11	January 17, 2000	April 3, 2000	MTV	Carlos "Los" Jackson, Dan Setzler, Holly Shand, Piggy Thomas, Veronica Portillo & Yes Duffy
4	Extreme Challenge	2 teams of 6	17	January 9, 2001	May 1, 2001	MTV	Dan Renzi, Jamie Murray, Julie Stoffer, Kameelah Phillips, Rebecca Lord & Syrus Yarbrough
5	Battle of the Seasons	2 teams of 8 pairs	15	February 4, 2002	May 20, 2002	MTV	Danny Roberts & Kelley Limp, Mike Mizanin & Coral Smith; Sean Duffy & Elka Walker
6	Battle of the Sexes	2 teams of 18	18	January 6, 2003	May 5, 2003	MTV	Colin Mortensen, Jamie Murray & Mark Long
7	The Gauntlet	2 teams of 14	16	September 29, 2003	January 26, 2004	MTV	Adam Larson, Cara Zavaleta, Darrell Taylor, Dave Giuntoli, Rachel Robinson, Roni Martin, Sarah Greyson, Theo Vonkurnatowski & Veronica Portillo
8	The Inferno	2 teams of 10	19	February 2, 2004	May 31, 2004	MTV	Abram Boise, Christena Pyle, Darrell Taylor, Holly Shand, Katie Doyle, Kendal Sheppard, Timmy Beggy & Veronica Portillo
9	Battle of the Sexes 2	2 teams of 18	17	October 4, 2004	January 31, 2005	MTV	Dan Setzler, Eric Nies & Theo Vonkurnatowski
10	The Inferno II	2 teams of 10	16	March 7, 2005	June 20, 2005	MTV	Darrell Taylor, Jamie Chung, Landon Lueck & Mike Mizanin
11	The Gauntlet 2	2 teams of 16	18	December 5, 2005	March 27, 2006	MTV	Alton Williams, Ibis Nieves, Jamie Murray, Jodi Weatherton, Kina Dean, Landon Lueck, MJ Garrett, Randy Barry & Susie Meister
12	Fresh Meat	12 pairs	16	May 29, 2006	September 11, 2006	MTV	Darrell Taylor & Aviv Melmed
13	The Duel	Individual	17	October 12, 2006	January 18, 2007	MTV	Wes Bergmann and Jodi Weatherton
14	The Inferno 3	2 teams of 10	16	April 10, 2007	July 3, 2007	MTV	Abram Boise, Derrick Kosinski, Evelyn Smith, Janelle Casanave, Kenny Santucci & Tonya Cooley
15	The Gauntlet III	2 teams of 16	10	January 23, 2008	March 26, 2008	MTV	Frank Roessler, Jillian Zoboroski, Johanna Botta, Nehemiah Clark, Rachel Moyal & Tori Hall
16	The Island	Individual →2 teams of 4	9	September 10, 2008	November 5, 2008	MTV	Derrick Kosinski, Evelyn Smith, Johnny Devenanzio & Kenny Santucci
17	The Duel II	Individual	10	April 8, 2009	June 10, 2009	MTV	Evan Starkman and Rachel Robinson
18	The Ruins	2 teams of 14	10	September 30, 2009	December 9, 2009	MTV	Derrick Kosinski, Evan Starkman, Johnny Devenanzio, Kenny Santucci & Susie Meister
19	Fresh Meat II	13 pairs	10	April 7, 2010	June 9, 2010	MTV	Landon Lueck & Carley Johnson
20	Cutthroat	3 teams of 10	10	October 6, 2010	December 15, 2010	MTV	Brad Fiorenza, Dunbar Merrill, Tori Hall & Tyler Duckworth
21	Rivals	14 pairs	10	June 22, 2011	August 24, 2011	MTV	Johnny Devenanzio & Tyler Duckworth and Evelyn Smith & Paula Meronek
22	Battle of the Exes	13 pairs	10	January 25, 2012	March 28, 2012	MTV	Johnny Devenanzio & Camila Nakagawa
23	Battle of the Seasons	8 teams of 4	12	September 19, 2012	December 19, 2012	MTV	Ashley Kelsey, Frank Sweeney, Sam McGinn & Zach Nichols
24	Rivals II	16 pairs	12	July 10, 2013	September 25, 2013	MTV	Chris "CT" Tamburello & Wes Bergmann and Emily Schromm & Paula Meronek
25	Free Agents	Individual (Pairs/Teams)	12	April 10, 2014	June 26, 2014	MTV	Johnny "Bananas" Devenanzio and Laurel Stucky
26	Battle of the Exes II	13 pairs	12	January 6, 2015	March 24, 2015	MTV	Jordan Wiseley & Sarah Rice
27	Battle of the Bloodlines	14 pairs → 2 teams of 12 → 5 pairs	13	December 2, 2015	February 17, 2016	MTV	Cara Maria Sorbello & Jamie Banks
28	Rivals III	13 pairs	14	May 4, 2016	August 3, 2016	MTV	Johnny "Bananas" Devenanzio & Sarah Rice
29	Invasion of the Champions	Individual → 2 teams → Individual	14	February 7, 2017	May 9, 2017	MTV	Chris "CT" Tamburello and Ashley Mitchell
30	XXX: Dirty 30	Individual (Pairs/Teams)	17	July 18, 2017	November 7, 2017	MTV	Jordan Wiseley and Camila Nakagawa
31	Vendettas	Individual (Teams)	14	January 2, 2018	April 3, 2018	MTV	Cara Maria Sorbello
32	Final Reckoning	17 pairs	20	July 10, 2018	November 20, 2018	MTV	Ashley Mitchell & Hunter Barfield
33	War of the Worlds	16 pairs → Individual	16	February 6, 2019	May 22, 2019	MTV	Turabi "Turbo" Çamkıran
34	War of the Worlds 2	2 teams of 16	16	August 28, 2019	December 11, 2019	MTV	Chris "CT" Tamburello, Dee Nguyen, Jordan Wiseley & Rogan O'Connor
35	Total Madness	Individual (Pairs/Teams)	16	April 1, 2020	July 15, 2020	MTV	Jenny West and Johnny "Bananas" Devenanzio
36	Double Agents	15 pairs	19	December 9, 2020	April 21, 2021	MTV	Amber Borzotra & Chris "CT" Tamburello
37	Spies, Lies & Allies	17 pairs → 3 teams of 6 → Individual→ 3 pairs	19	August 11, 2021	December 15, 2021	MTV	Chris "CT" Tamburello & Kaycee Clark
38	Ride or Dies	17 pairs → 2 teams of 8 →7 pairs	19	October 12, 2022	February 15, 2023	MTV	Devin Walker-Molaghan & Tori Deal
39	Battle for a New Champion	Individual (Pairs/Teams)	19	October 25, 2023	February 21, 2024	MTV	Emanuel Neagu
40	40: Battle of the Eras	4 teams of 10 → Individual	19	August 14, 2024	January 8, 2025	MTV	Jenny West, Jordan Wiseley and Rachel Robinson
41	Vets & New Threats	16 pairs	19	July 30, 2025	December 3, 2025	MTV	Olivia Kaiser & Yeremi Hykel
42	Cutthroat	3 teams of 8	TBA	August 5, 2026	TBA	Paramount+	TBA

== Episodes ==
=== Season 16 (2008) ===
No. overall	No. in season	Title	Original release date
213	1	"Welcome to the Island"	September 10, 2008
214	2	"Calling It Quits"	September 17, 2008
215	3	"Girl Fight"	September 24, 2008
216	4	"Are You a Quitter?"	October 1, 2008
217	5	"Ev vs. The Island"	October 8, 2008
218	6	"Island King"	October 15, 2008
219	7	"Down to the Wire"	October 22, 2008
220	8	"Sailing to Victory"	October 29, 2008

=== Season 17 (2009) ===
No. overall	No. in season	Title	Original release date
221	1	"Damned If You Duel..."	April 8, 2009
222	2	"Duel Unto Others"	April 15, 2009
223	3	"Duel What You Gotta Duel"	April 22, 2009
224	4	"Duel-ality"	April 29, 2009
225	5	"Duelers On The Verge Of A Nervous Breakdown"	May 6, 2009
226	6	"Dueling For Dunbar"	May 13, 2009
227	7	"Deja Duel"	May 20, 2009
228	8	"If These Duels Could Talk"	May 27, 2009
229	9	"Til Death Duel Us Part"	June 3, 2009
230	10	"Duel Or Die"	June 10, 2009

=== Season 18 (2009) ===
No. overall	No. in season	Title	Original release date	US viewers (millions)
231	1	"Wes Side Story"	September 30, 2009	1.699
232	2	"The Booby Trap"	October 7, 2009	N/A
233	3	"The Road to Ruins"	October 14, 2009	N/A
234	4	"Girls Gone Wild"	October 21, 2009	N/A
235	5	"Reversal of Fortune"	October 28, 2009	N/A
236	6	"Ruining On Empty"	November 4, 2009	N/A
237	7	"Silence of the Ruins"	November 11, 2009	N/A
238	8	"Thai Me Up! Thai Me Down!"	November 18, 2009	N/A
239	9	"Muay So-Called Ruins?"	December 2, 2009	N/A
240	10	"Good Thai and Good Luck"	December 9, 2009	N/A

=== Season 19 (2010) ===
No. overall	No. in season	Title	Original release date	US viewers (millions)
241	1	"Nice to Meat You"	April 7, 2010	1.39
242	2	"Meating of the Minds"	April 14, 2010	1.24
243	3	"Sloppy Ho's"	April 21, 2010	1.56
244	4	"Meats 'N Potatoes"	April 28, 2010	1.13
245	5	"Road Kill"	May 5, 2010	1.15
246	6	"Checkmeat!"	May 12, 2010	1.06
247	7	"Trimming The Fat"	May 19, 2010	1.20
248	8	"Spoiled Rotten Meat"	May 26, 2010	0.93
249	9	"All U Can Eat Stakes"	June 2, 2010	1.11
250	10	"Well Done, Meat"	June 9, 2010	1.16

=== Season 20 (2010) ===
No. overall	No. in season	Title	Original release date	US viewers (millions)
251	1	"Czech Yourself Before You Wreck Yourself"	October 6, 2010	1.74
252	2	"Newbie Doobie Doo"	October 13, 2010	1.27
253	3	"Karma's a Bitch"	October 20, 2010	1.28
254	4	"Swat the Hell?"	October 27, 2010	1.44
255	5	"Couching Tyger, Hidden Danimal"	November 3, 2010	1.31
256	6	"Where The Red Team Blows"	November 10, 2010	1.47
257	7	"Hell Hath No Fury"	November 17, 2010	1.41
258	8	"Back With a Vengeance"	December 1, 2010	1.05
259	9	"Always a Bridesmaid..."	December 8, 2010	1.24
260	10	"Czechmate"	December 15, 2010	1.39

=== Season 21 (2011) ===
No. overall	No. in season	Title	Original release date	US viewers (millions)
261	1	"Welcome to the Jungle"	June 22, 2011	1.88
262	2	"Through the Looking Glass"	June 29, 2011	1.36
263	3	"Underdog Day Afternoon"	July 6, 2011	1.66
264	4	"D-Day"	July 13, 2011	1.62
265	5	"Ill-Communication"	July 20, 2011	1.66
266	6	"Blowup"	July 27, 2011	1.99
267	7	"Blood on the Dance Floor"	August 3, 2011	1.59
268	8	"Cry For Me, Argentina"	August 10, 2011	2.06
269	9	"The Storm Before the Storm"	August 17, 2011	1.99
270	10	"At the End of the World"	August 24, 2011	2.37

=== Season 22 (2012) ===
No. overall	No. in season	Title	Original release date	US viewers (millions)
271	1	"Love Is A Battlefield"	January 25, 2012	1.91
272	2	"What's Love Got to Do With It?"	February 1, 2012	2.29
273	3	"Where Did Our Love Go?"	February 8, 2012	1.91
274	4	"Love the Way You Lie"	February 15, 2012	1.94
275	5	"Crazy in Love"	February 22, 2012	1.99
276	6	"Tainted Love"	February 29, 2012	1.90
277	7	"Love and Marriage"	March 7, 2012	1.82
278	8	"On the Wings of Love"	March 14, 2012	1.81
279	9	"Will You Still Love Me Tomorrow?"	March 21, 2012	1.81
280	10	"I Will Always Love You"	March 28, 2012	1.99

=== Season 23 (2012) ===
No. overall	No. in season	Title	Original release date	US viewers (millions)
281	1	"Tis the Season"	September 19, 2012	1.15
282	2	"The Perks of Being a Rookie"	September 26, 2012	1.23
283	3	"What Happens in Vegas..."	October 3, 2012	1.11
284	4	"The Dark Knight"	October 10, 2012	1.06
285	5	"N-A-R-C-I-S-S-I-S-T-I-C"	October 17, 2012	0.91
286	6	"Going Insane"	October 24, 2012	1.16
287	7	"I Do Not Like You Sam I Am"	November 7, 2012	1.10
288	8	"Honey, I'm Homeless"	November 14, 2012	1.07
289	9	"The Chronicles of Nanyia"	November 28, 2012	1.34
290	10	"A Woman Scorned"	December 5, 2012	0.98
291	11	"I Like to Move it, Move it"	December 12, 2012	0.96
292	12	"Operation Desert Scorn"	December 19, 2012	1.01

=== Season 24 (2013) ===
No. overall	No. in season	Title	Original release date	US viewers (millions)
293	1	"Rumble in the Jungle"	July 10, 2013	1.57
294	2	"New Girl"	July 17, 2013	1.40
295	3	"The Dark Knight Rises"	July 24, 2013	1.61
296	4	"Mortuusequusphobia"	July 31, 2013	1.78
297	5	"What The Phuket?!"	August 7, 2013	1.48
298	6	"Revenge Is a Dish Best Not Serve"	August 14, 2013	1.34
299	7	"Crossing Jordan"	August 21, 2013	1.34
300	8	"Thrilla in Camila"	August 28, 2013	1.36
301	9	"Diemnesia"	September 4, 2013	1.54
302	10	"True Colors"	September 11, 2013	1.34
303	11	"Final Destination"	September 18, 2013	1.27
304	12	"The Island of Misfit Challengers"	September 25, 2013	1.61

=== Season 25 (2014) ===
No. overall	No. in season	Title	Original release date	US viewers (millions)
305	1	"Live Free or Die"	April 10, 2014	0.95
306	2	"Love in the Fast Lane"	April 17, 2014	0.92
307	3	"You Be Illin'"	April 24, 2014	0.93
308	4	"Inadequate"	May 1, 2014	1.11
309	5	"Stripes"	May 8, 2014	0.97
310	6	"Not So Trivial Pursuits"	May 15, 2014	1.07
311	7	"Pride Before The Wall"	May 22, 2014	1.14
312	8	"Strike a Pose, There's Something to It"	May 29, 2014	1.08
313	9	"Best Friends for Never"	June 5, 2014	1.06
314	10	"Talk to the Hand"	June 12, 2014	1.14
315	11	"The $350,000 Pyramid"	June 19, 2014	1.01
316	12	"A Walk in the Clouds"	June 26, 2014	1.15

=== Season 26 (2015) ===
No. overall	No. in season	Title	Original release date	US viewers (millions)
317	1	"Where Is The Love?"	January 6, 2015	0.78
318	2	"I Will Always Hate You"	January 13, 2015	0.91
319	3	"Love Sick"	January 20, 2015	0.84
320	4	"Crazy Stupid Love"	January 27, 2015	1.01
321	5	"Love, Sweat, and Tears"	February 3, 2015	0.99
322	6	"Love Hurts"	February 10, 2015	0.75
323	7	"That's the Way Love Goes"	February 17, 2015	0.83
324	8	"You've Lost That Loving Feeling"	February 24, 2015	0.76
325	9	"Total Eclipse Of The Heart"	March 3, 2015	0.83
326	10	"Lovers In The Dark"	March 10, 2015	1.03
327	11	"Bye Bye Love"	March 17, 2015	1.01
328	12	"The Greatest Love of All"	March 24, 2015	1.03

=== Season 27 (2015–2016) ===
No. overall	No. in season	Title	Original release date	US viewers (millions)
329	1	"There Will Be Blood"	December 2, 2015	0.55
330	2	"Bad Blood"	December 9, 2015	0.56
331	3	"Camilanator: Judgement Day"	December 16, 2015	0.68
332	4	"Corneesa"	December 23, 2015	0.69
333	5	"A House Divided"	December 30, 2015	0.84
334	6	"Dirty Little Secret"	December 30, 2015	0.79
335	7	"Blood Brothers"	January 6, 2016	0.76
336	8	"Blood Is Thicker Than Mud"	January 13, 2016	0.88
337	9	"Blood Versus Love"	January 20, 2016	0.93
338	10	"Out For Blood"	January 27, 2016	0.72
339	11	"Tear Down This Wall"	February 3, 2016	0.79
340	12	"True Blood"	February 10, 2016	0.73
341	13	"Family Matters"	February 17, 2016	0.88

=== Season 28 (2016) ===
No. overall	No. in season	Title	Original release date	US viewers (millions)
343	1	"Mexican Standoff"	May 4, 2016	0.66
344	2	"The Curse of the Black Skull"	May 11, 2016	0.70
345	3	"The Replacements"	May 18, 2016	0.73
346	4	"I'm Going Home"	May 25, 2016	0.84
347	5	"Where The Ratchet Things Are"	June 1, 2016	0.73
348	6	"The Naked Truth"	June 8, 2016	0.74
349	7	"Camilanator: Salvation"	June 15, 2016	0.78
350	8	"Stand By Me"	June 22, 2016	0.86
351	9	"Let Sleeping Dogs Wake"	June 29, 2016	0.84
352	10	"Digging Your Own Grave"	July 6, 2016	0.92
353	11	"Rivals: Civil War"	July 13, 2016	0.76
354	12	"Raging Bullies"	July 20, 2016	0.80
355	13	"Grapes. Wrath."	July 27, 2016	0.68
356	14	"Split Decision"	August 3, 2016	0.72

=== Season 29 (2017) ===
No. overall	No. in season	Title	Original release date	US viewers (millions)
357	1	"Gimmie Shelter"	February 7, 2017	0.69
358	2	"Skeletal Fracture"	February 7, 2017	0.65
359	3	"Helter Shelter"	February 14, 2017	0.65
360	4	"Four Tickets To Paradise"	February 21, 2017	0.76
361	5	"Underdog Eat Underdog World"	February 28, 2017	0.78
362	6	"The Mile-High Club"	March 7, 2017	0.80
363	7	"Achy Breaky Heart"	March 14, 2017	0.86
364	8	"A Low Down Dirty Shane"	March 21, 2017	0.81
365	9	"An Officer and a Gentlewoman"	March 28, 2017	0.82
366	10	"Go Your Own Way"	April 4, 2017	0.76
367	11	"The Bloodbath"	April 11, 2017	0.78
368	12	"Caged"	April 18, 2017	0.79
369	13	"A River of Endless Light"	April 25, 2017	0.76
370	14	"Math Is Hard"	May 2, 2017	0.78
371	15	"The True Champions"	May 9, 2017	0.73

=== Season 30 (2017) ===
No. overall	No. in season	Title	Original release date	US viewers (millions)
371	1	"Thirty Rotten Scoundrels"	July 18, 2017	0.84
372	2	"Shots Fired!"	July 25, 2017	0.82
373	3	"Pride Before the Fall"	August 1, 2017	0.84
374	4	"Dirty Deeds"	August 8, 2017	0.93
375	5	"Road to Redemption"	August 15, 2017	0.88
376	6	"YAAAASS, Booty!"	August 22, 2017	0.83
377	7	"Ankles Aweigh"	August 29, 2017	0.81
378	8	"Dirty Little Secret"	September 5, 2017	0.83
379	9	"Rampage"	September 12, 2017	0.65
380	10	"Guess Who's Coming to Dinner"	September 19, 2017	0.83
381	11	"The Heart is a Lonely Hunter"	September 26, 2017	0.74
382	12	"Boxed In"	October 3, 2017	0.91
383	13	"Feel The Burn"	October 10, 2017	0.81
384	14	"Pretty Little Backstabbers"	October 17, 2017	0.77
385	15	"A Million More Reasons"	October 24, 2017	0.76
386	16	"The Sinister Six"	October 31, 2017	0.64
387	17	"One in a Million"	November 7, 2017	0.71
