= List of The Challenge (TV series) episodes (seasons 1–15) =

Airings of the MTV reality series from 1998 to 2008

The Challenge is a reality competition show on MTV that is a spin-off of two of the network's reality shows: The Real World and Road Rules. The series premiered on April 20, 1998, and was originally titled Road Rules: All Stars. It was renamed Real World/Road Rules Challenge on the second season, then later abridged to simply The Challenge by the show's 19th season.

== Series overview ==
Season	Title/Subtitle	Format	Episodes	Originally released			Champion(s)
Season	Title/Subtitle	Format	Episodes	First released	Last released	Network	Champion(s)
1	Road Rules: All Stars	1 team of 5	5	April 20, 1998	May 18, 1998	MTV	Cynthia Roberts, Eric Nies, Jon Brennan, Rachel Campos & Sean Duffy
2	Real World/Road Rules Challenge	2 teams of 6	6	November 9, 1999	December 14, 1999	MTV	Anne Wharton, Kalle Dedolph, Kefla Hare, Mark Long, Noah Rickun & Roni Martin
3	Challenge 2000	2 teams of 6	11	January 17, 2000	April 3, 2000	MTV	Carlos "Los" Jackson, Dan Setzler, Holly Shand, Piggy Thomas, Veronica Portillo & Yes Duffy
4	Extreme Challenge	2 teams of 6	17	January 9, 2001	May 1, 2001	MTV	Dan Renzi, Jamie Murray, Julie Stoffer, Kameelah Phillips, Rebecca Lord & Syrus Yarbrough
5	Battle of the Seasons	2 teams of 8 pairs	15	February 4, 2002	May 20, 2002	MTV	Danny Roberts & Kelley Limp, Mike Mizanin & Coral Smith; Sean Duffy & Elka Walker
6	Battle of the Sexes	2 teams of 18	18	January 6, 2003	May 5, 2003	MTV	Colin Mortensen, Jamie Murray & Mark Long
7	The Gauntlet	2 teams of 14	16	September 29, 2003	January 26, 2004	MTV	Adam Larson, Cara Zavaleta, Darrell Taylor, Dave Giuntoli, Rachel Robinson, Roni Martin, Sarah Greyson, Theo Vonkurnatowski & Veronica Portillo
8	The Inferno	2 teams of 10	19	February 2, 2004	May 31, 2004	MTV	Abram Boise, Christena Pyle, Darrell Taylor, Holly Shand, Katie Doyle, Kendal Sheppard, Timmy Beggy & Veronica Portillo
9	Battle of the Sexes 2	2 teams of 18	17	October 4, 2004	January 31, 2005	MTV	Dan Setzler, Eric Nies & Theo Vonkurnatowski
10	The Inferno II	2 teams of 10	16	March 7, 2005	June 20, 2005	MTV	Darrell Taylor, Jamie Chung, Landon Lueck & Mike Mizanin
11	The Gauntlet 2	2 teams of 16	18	December 5, 2005	March 27, 2006	MTV	Alton Williams, Ibis Nieves, Jamie Murray, Jodi Weatherton, Kina Dean, Landon Lueck, MJ Garrett, Randy Barry & Susie Meister
12	Fresh Meat	12 pairs	16	May 29, 2006	September 11, 2006	MTV	Darrell Taylor & Aviv Melmed
13	The Duel	Individual	17	October 12, 2006	January 18, 2007	MTV	Wes Bergmann and Jodi Weatherton
14	The Inferno 3	2 teams of 10	16	April 10, 2007	July 3, 2007	MTV	Abram Boise, Derrick Kosinski, Evelyn Smith, Janelle Casanave, Kenny Santucci & Tonya Cooley
15	The Gauntlet III	2 teams of 16	10	January 23, 2008	March 26, 2008	MTV	Frank Roessler, Jillian Zoboroski, Johanna Botta, Nehemiah Clark, Rachel Moyal & Tori Hall
16	The Island	Individual →2 teams of 4	9	September 10, 2008	November 5, 2008	MTV	Derrick Kosinski, Evelyn Smith, Johnny Devenanzio & Kenny Santucci
17	The Duel II	Individual	10	April 8, 2009	June 10, 2009	MTV	Evan Starkman and Rachel Robinson
18	The Ruins	2 teams of 14	10	September 30, 2009	December 9, 2009	MTV	Derrick Kosinski, Evan Starkman, Johnny Devenanzio, Kenny Santucci & Susie Meister
19	Fresh Meat II	13 pairs	10	April 7, 2010	June 9, 2010	MTV	Landon Lueck & Carley Johnson
20	Cutthroat	3 teams of 10	10	October 6, 2010	December 15, 2010	MTV	Brad Fiorenza, Dunbar Merrill, Tori Hall & Tyler Duckworth
21	Rivals	14 pairs	10	June 22, 2011	August 24, 2011	MTV	Johnny Devenanzio & Tyler Duckworth and Evelyn Smith & Paula Meronek
22	Battle of the Exes	13 pairs	10	January 25, 2012	March 28, 2012	MTV	Johnny Devenanzio & Camila Nakagawa
23	Battle of the Seasons	8 teams of 4	12	September 19, 2012	December 19, 2012	MTV	Ashley Kelsey, Frank Sweeney, Sam McGinn & Zach Nichols
24	Rivals II	16 pairs	12	July 10, 2013	September 25, 2013	MTV	Chris "CT" Tamburello & Wes Bergmann and Emily Schromm & Paula Meronek
25	Free Agents	Individual (Pairs/Teams)	12	April 10, 2014	June 26, 2014	MTV	Johnny "Bananas" Devenanzio and Laurel Stucky
26	Battle of the Exes II	13 pairs	12	January 6, 2015	March 24, 2015	MTV	Jordan Wiseley & Sarah Rice
27	Battle of the Bloodlines	14 pairs → 2 teams of 12 → 5 pairs	13	December 2, 2015	February 17, 2016	MTV	Cara Maria Sorbello & Jamie Banks
28	Rivals III	13 pairs	14	May 4, 2016	August 3, 2016	MTV	Johnny "Bananas" Devenanzio & Sarah Rice
29	Invasion of the Champions	Individual → 2 teams → Individual	14	February 7, 2017	May 9, 2017	MTV	Chris "CT" Tamburello and Ashley Mitchell
30	XXX: Dirty 30	Individual (Pairs/Teams)	17	July 18, 2017	November 7, 2017	MTV	Jordan Wiseley and Camila Nakagawa
31	Vendettas	Individual (Teams)	14	January 2, 2018	April 3, 2018	MTV	Cara Maria Sorbello
32	Final Reckoning	17 pairs	20	July 10, 2018	November 20, 2018	MTV	Ashley Mitchell & Hunter Barfield
33	War of the Worlds	16 pairs → Individual	16	February 6, 2019	May 22, 2019	MTV	Turabi "Turbo" Çamkıran
34	War of the Worlds 2	2 teams of 16	16	August 28, 2019	December 11, 2019	MTV	Chris "CT" Tamburello, Dee Nguyen, Jordan Wiseley & Rogan O'Connor
35	Total Madness	Individual (Pairs/Teams)	16	April 1, 2020	July 15, 2020	MTV	Jenny West and Johnny "Bananas" Devenanzio
36	Double Agents	15 pairs	19	December 9, 2020	April 21, 2021	MTV	Amber Borzotra & Chris "CT" Tamburello
37	Spies, Lies & Allies	17 pairs → 3 teams of 6 → Individual→ 3 pairs	19	August 11, 2021	December 15, 2021	MTV	Chris "CT" Tamburello & Kaycee Clark
38	Ride or Dies	17 pairs → 2 teams of 8 →7 pairs	19	October 12, 2022	February 15, 2023	MTV	Devin Walker-Molaghan & Tori Deal
39	Battle for a New Champion	Individual (Pairs/Teams)	19	October 25, 2023	February 21, 2024	MTV	Emanuel Neagu
40	40: Battle of the Eras	4 teams of 10 → Individual	19	August 14, 2024	January 8, 2025	MTV	Jenny West, Jordan Wiseley and Rachel Robinson
41	Vets & New Threats	16 pairs	19	July 30, 2025	December 3, 2025	MTV	Olivia Kaiser & Yeremi Hykel
42	Cutthroat	3 teams of 8	TBA	August 5, 2026	TBA	Paramount+	TBA

== Episodes ==
=== Season 1 (1998) ===
No. overall	No. in season	Title	Original release date
1	1	"Five Easy Pieces"	April 20, 1998
2	2	"Shear Madness"	April 27, 1998
3	3	"A Radish In A Salad Spinner"	May 4, 1998
4	4	"How To Eat Fried Worms..."	May 11, 1998
5	5	"Fresh Squeezed Creative Juices"	May 18, 1998

=== Season 2 (1999) ===
No. overall	No. in season	Title	Original release date
6	1	"Money Changes Everything"	November 9, 1999
7	2	"Bed Sores"	November 16, 1999
8	3	"Getting Drunk"	November 23, 1999
9	4	"The Joint is Jumping"	November 30, 1999
10	5	"Shall We Play A Game?"	December 7, 1999
11	6	"Handsome Reward"	December 14, 1999

=== Season 3 (2000) ===
No. overall	No. in season	Title	Original release date
12	1	"Stratos-Fear"	January 17, 2000
13	2	"Demolition Derby"	January 24, 2000
14	3	"Wheel of Wrestling"	January 31, 2000
15	4	"Snake Wrangling"	February 7, 2000
16	5	"Redneck Games"	February 14, 2000
17	6	"Mud Football"	February 21, 2000
18	7	"Swamp Buggy Racing"	February 28, 2000
19	8	"Sweet Revenge"	March 6, 2000
20	9	"Homemade Swimsuit Contest"	March 13, 2000
21	10	"Stir Crazy"	March 27, 2000
22	11	"Handsome Reward"	April 3, 2000

=== Season 4 (2001) ===
No. overall	No. in season	Title	Original release date
23	1	"A Challenging Decision"	January 9, 2001
24	2	"Blimp Water-Skiing"	January 16, 2001
25	3	"Budding Romance"	January 23, 2001
26	4	"No Laughing Matter"	January 30, 2001
27	5	"Rollerball Resurrection"	February 6, 2001
28	6	"Ayanna's Departure"	February 13, 2001
29	7	"Wrestling with the Past"	February 20, 2001
30	8	"Love and Foosball"	February 27, 2001
31	9	"Yes Sir...I Mean, Yes Ma'am!"	March 6, 2001
32	10	"Leader of the Pack"	March 13, 2001
33	11	"The Scariest Mission of All Time"	March 20, 2001
34	12	"Tough Love"	March 27, 2001
35	13	"Grudge Match"	April 3, 2001
36	14	"Good Intentions"	April 10, 2001
37	15	"Downward Spiral"	April 17, 2001
38	16	"True to Himself"	April 24, 2001
39	17	"Race to the Finish"	May 1, 2001

=== Season 5 (2002) ===
No. overall	No. in season	Title	Original release date
40	1	"Hang Man"	February 4, 2002
41	2	"Hurricane Juliette"	February 11, 2002
42	3	"Who To Vote Off?"	February 18, 2002
43	4	"Musical Inner-Tube Tango"	February 25, 2002
44	5	"Vertical Limit"	March 4, 2002
45	6	"Slam Dunk"	March 11, 2002
46	7	"Montezuma's Revenge"	March 25, 2002
47	8	"Ladder of Doom"	April 1, 2002
48	9	"Round 'Em Up"	April 8, 2002
49	10	"Rush Hour"	April 15, 2002
50	11	"Hands of Saturn"	April 22, 2002
51	12	"Sidekick Showdown"	April 29, 2002
52	13	"Blockhead"	May 6, 2002
53	14	"Siamese Wrestling"	May 13, 2002
54	15	"Handsome Reward"	May 20, 2002

=== Season 6 (2003) ===
No. overall	No. in season	Title	Original release date
55	1	"Hola Jamaica"	January 6, 2003
56	2	"Sargeant Says"	January 6, 2003
57	3	"Dead Man's Drop"	January 13, 2003
58	4	"Tree House"	January 20, 2003
59	5	"Breath-Hold Bungee"	January 27, 2003
60	6	"Puck's Wedding"	February 3, 2003
61	7	"Seven Rings of Saturn"	February 10, 2003
62	8	"Freeze Your Butt Off"	February 17, 2003
63	9	"People Mover"	February 24, 2003
64	10	"Battle of the Opposite Sexes"	March 3, 2003
65	11	"Leaky River"	March 17, 2003
66	12	"Stairway to Heaven"	March 24, 2003
67	13	"Collision Course"	March 31, 2003
68	14	"Spider Mon"	April 7, 2003
69	15	"Human Aquarium"	April 14, 2003
70	16	"Razors Edge"	April 21, 2003
71	17	"Maximum Velocity"	April 28, 2003
72	18	"Handsome Reward"	May 5, 2003

=== Season 7 (2003–2004) ===
No. overall	No. in season	Title	Original release date
73	1	"Howdy Telluride"	September 29, 2003
74	2	"Masquerade"	October 6, 2003
75	3	"Mud Bath"	October 13, 2003
76	4	"I Scream"	October 20, 2003
77	5	"Holey Canoe"	October 27, 2003
78	6	"Heavyweight Hustle"	November 3, 2003
79	7	"Sink My Ship"	November 10, 2003
80	8	"Red Barron"	November 17, 2003
81	9	"Inferno"	November 24, 2003
82	10	"Rolling on the River"	December 1, 2003
83	11	"Turntable"	December 8, 2003
84	12	"All or Nothing"	December 15, 2003
85	13	"Vertical Limit"	December 29, 2003
86	14	"Dukes of Saturn"	January 5, 2004
87	15	"Gold Rush Part 1"	January 12, 2004
88	16	"Gold Rush Part 2"	January 19, 2004

=== Season 8 (2004) ===
No. overall	No. in season	Title	Original release date
89	1	"Grope the Rope"	February 2, 2004
90	2	"Birdfeeder"	February 2, 2004
91	3	"Wreck n' Roll"	February 9, 2004
92	4	"Climbing Wall"	February 16, 2004
93	5	"Disco Domino Derby"	February 23, 2004
94	6	"Balls Out"	March 1, 2004
95	7	"Ultimate Saturn Road Trip"	March 8, 2004
96	8	"Don't Yank My Chain"	March 15, 2004
97	9	"Come Sail Away"	March 22, 2004
98	10	"Bungee Bound"	March 29, 2004
99	11	"Twist and Shoot"	April 5, 2004
100	12	"Balcony Swing"	April 12, 2004
101	13	"Fallen Angels"	April 19, 2004
102	14	"Saturn Valet Ballet"	May 3, 2004
103	15	"Window Washing"	May 10, 2004
104	16	"The Final Burn"	May 17, 2004
105	17	"Handsome Reward"	May 24, 2004

=== Season 9 (2004–2005) ===
No. overall	No. in season	Title	Original release date
106	1	"Howdy Santa Fe"	October 4, 2004
107	2	"Dangle Drop"	October 11, 2004
108	3	"Snake Pit Poker"	October 18, 2004
109	4	"Melt with You"	October 25, 2004
110	5	"Bombs Away"	November 1, 2004
111	6	"Junk Boat"	November 8, 2004
112	7	"High Noon"	November 15, 2004
113	8	"Fill'er Up"	November 22, 2004
114	9	"Sa-Wing"	November 29, 2004
115	10	"Electro-Shock"	December 6, 2004
116	11	"Pop Culture Bike Ramp"	December 13, 2004
117	12	"The Shredder"	December 20, 2004
118	13	"Cast a Spell"	December 27, 2004
119	14	"Semi-Cross"	January 3, 2005
120	15	"Car-Go"	January 10, 2005
121	16	"Vertigo"	January 17, 2005
122	17	"Handsome Reward"	January 24, 2005

=== Season 10 (2005) ===
No. overall	No. in season	Title	Original release date
123	1	"Surf Torture"	March 7, 2005
124	2	"Juice It Up"	March 14, 2005
125	3	"X Marks the Spot"	March 21, 2005
126	4	"Run for Your Money"	March 28, 2005
127	5	"Shirt Off My Back"	April 11, 2005
128	6	"Dodge Yer Balls"	April 11, 2005
129	7	"Fill In the Gaps"	April 18, 2005
130	8	"Zip Up"	April 25, 2005
131	9	"Never Ending Climb"	May 2, 2005
132	10	"What a Drag"	May 9, 2005
133	11	"Riddle Me This"	May 16, 2005
134	12	"Time to Ride"	May 23, 2005
135	13	"If Memory Serves"	May 30, 2005
136	14	"Crab Grab"	June 6, 2005
137	15	"Heart Rate Bungee"	June 13, 2005
138	16	"Montezuma's Revenge"	June 20, 2005

=== Season 11 (2005–2006) ===
No. overall	No. in season	Title	Original release date
139	1	"Throwing Down the Gauntlet"	December 5, 2005
140	2	"Derrick Steps It Up"	December 12, 2005
141	3	"We Can Work It Out"	December 19, 2005
142	4	"The $10,000 Pyramid"	December 26, 2005
143	5	"Sloppy Seconds"	January 2, 2006
144	6	"Watching Paint Dry"	January 9, 2006
145	7	"The Heat Is On"	January 16, 2006
146	8	"Rookie Movies"	January 23, 2006
147	9	"Walking the Line"	January 30, 2006
148	10	"Bucked"	February 6, 2006
149	11	"Victory At Last"	February 13, 2006
150	12	"Tire Me Up, Tire Me Down"	February 20, 2006
151	13	"Mac-Beth"	February 27, 2006
152	14	"The Good, the Brad, and the Ugly"	March 6, 2006
153	15	"Blind Panic"	March 13, 2006
154	16	"Last Men Standing"	March 20, 2006
155	17	"Don't Bet On It"	March 27, 2006

=== Season 12 (2006) ===
No. overall	No. in season	Title	Original release date
156	1	"Kickin' Things Off"	May 29, 2006
157	2	"Anxieties Run High"	May 29, 2006
158	3	"Hanging Tough"	June 5, 2006
159	4	"Jailbirds"	June 12, 2006
160	5	"Climber's Paradise"	June 19, 2006
161	6	"Costume Extravaganza"	June 26, 2006
162	7	"Crossing Paths"	July 3, 2006
163	8	"Kayak Challenge"	July 10, 2006
165	9	"Kenny VS Tina?"	July 17, 2006
165	10	"Game Over?"	July 24, 2006
166	11	"Money or Friendship?"	July 31, 2006
167	12	"Jump Down Under"	August 7, 2006
168	13	"Diving In"	August 14, 2006
169	14	"Kenny & Tina's Triumph"	August 21, 2006
170	15	"The Death Roll"	August 28, 2006
171	16	"And The Winners Are..."	September 4, 2006

=== Season 13 (2006–2007) ===
No. overall	No. in season	Title	Original release date
172	1	"Welcome to Brazil"	October 12, 2006
173	2	"Welcome to Brazil"	October 12, 2006
174	3	"Goodbye Tina and Tyler"	October 19, 2006
175	4	"Paula vs. Aneesa"	October 26, 2006
176	5	"The Drama Mafia"	November 2, 2006
177	6	"Goodbye Casey"	November 9, 2006
178	7	"Nehemiah's Last Day"	November 16, 2006
179	8	"What Goes Around, Comes Around"	November 23, 2006
180	9	"Until Next Time, Derrick"	November 30, 2006
181	10	"Harsh Words"	December 7, 2006
182	11	"Friend or Foe?"	December 14, 2006
183	12	"Two For Two"	December 21, 2006
184	13	"Fallen Alliances"	January 4, 2007
185	14	"The Big Split"	January 4, 2007
186	15	"The Final Four"	January 11, 2007
187	16	"The Big Payoff"	January 18, 2007

=== Season 14 (2007) ===
No. overall	No. in season	Title	Original release date
188	1	"Welcome to Africa"	April 10, 2007
189	2	"Welcome to Africa"	April 10, 2007
190	3	"The Good Guys Strike Back!"	April 17, 2007
191	4	"Playing The Game"	April 24, 2007
192	5	"Kicking Ace"	May 1, 2007
193	6	"Off The Wall"	May 8, 2007
194	7	"Sour Grapes"	May 8, 2007
195	8	"Walk This Way"	May 15, 2007
196	9	"Bouncing Back"	May 15, 2007
197	10	"Pane In The Glass"	May 22, 2007
198	11	"Workin' On The Railroad"	May 29, 2007
199	12	"Match Point"	June 5, 2007
200	13	"High Voltage"	June 12, 2007
201	14	"Hook The Man"	June 19, 2007
202	15	"Team Girl Squad"	June 26, 2007
203	16	"The Big Five"	July 3, 2007

=== Season 15 (2008) ===
No. overall	No. in season	Title	Original release date
204	1	"Viva Mexico"	January 23, 2008
205	2	"It's Personal"	January 30, 2008
206	3	"Less Is More"	February 6, 2008
207	4	"It's Not Fair"	February 13, 2008
208	5	"Match-Up of the Century"	February 20, 2008
209	6	"All Alone"	February 27, 2008
210	7	"What Goes Around"	March 5, 2008
211	8	"Cold Blooded"	March 12, 2008
212	9	"The Finale"	March 19, 2008
