= List of The Challenge (TV series) episodes (seasons 31–present) =

Airings of the MTV reality series from 2018 to present

The Challenge is a reality competition show on MTV that is a spin-off of two of the network's reality shows: The Real World and Road Rules. The series premiered on April 20, 1998, and was originally titled Road Rules: All Stars. It was renamed Real World/Road Rules Challenge on the second season, then later abridged to simply The Challenge by the show's 19th season.

== Series overview ==
Season	Title/Subtitle	Format	Episodes	Originally released			Champion(s)
Season	Title/Subtitle	Format	Episodes	First released	Last released	Network	Champion(s)
1	Road Rules: All Stars	1 team of 5	5	April 20, 1998	May 18, 1998	MTV	Cynthia Roberts, Eric Nies, Jon Brennan, Rachel Campos & Sean Duffy
2	Real World/Road Rules Challenge	2 teams of 6	6	November 9, 1999	December 14, 1999	MTV	Anne Wharton, Kalle Dedolph, Kefla Hare, Mark Long, Noah Rickun & Roni Martin
3	Challenge 2000	2 teams of 6	11	January 17, 2000	April 3, 2000	MTV	Carlos "Los" Jackson, Dan Setzler, Holly Shand, Piggy Thomas, Veronica Portillo & Yes Duffy
4	Extreme Challenge	2 teams of 6	17	January 9, 2001	May 1, 2001	MTV	Dan Renzi, Jamie Murray, Julie Stoffer, Kameelah Phillips, Rebecca Lord & Syrus Yarbrough
5	Battle of the Seasons	2 teams of 8 pairs	15	February 4, 2002	May 20, 2002	MTV	Danny Roberts & Kelley Limp, Mike Mizanin & Coral Smith; Sean Duffy & Elka Walker
6	Battle of the Sexes	2 teams of 18	18	January 6, 2003	May 5, 2003	MTV	Colin Mortensen, Jamie Murray & Mark Long
7	The Gauntlet	2 teams of 14	16	September 29, 2003	January 26, 2004	MTV	Adam Larson, Cara Zavaleta, Darrell Taylor, Dave Giuntoli, Rachel Robinson, Roni Martin, Sarah Greyson, Theo Vonkurnatowski & Veronica Portillo
8	The Inferno	2 teams of 10	19	February 2, 2004	May 31, 2004	MTV	Abram Boise, Christena Pyle, Darrell Taylor, Holly Shand, Katie Doyle, Kendal Sheppard, Timmy Beggy & Veronica Portillo
9	Battle of the Sexes 2	2 teams of 18	17	October 4, 2004	January 31, 2005	MTV	Dan Setzler, Eric Nies & Theo Vonkurnatowski
10	The Inferno II	2 teams of 10	16	March 7, 2005	June 20, 2005	MTV	Darrell Taylor, Jamie Chung, Landon Lueck & Mike Mizanin
11	The Gauntlet 2	2 teams of 16	18	December 5, 2005	March 27, 2006	MTV	Alton Williams, Ibis Nieves, Jamie Murray, Jodi Weatherton, Kina Dean, Landon Lueck, MJ Garrett, Randy Barry & Susie Meister
12	Fresh Meat	12 pairs	16	May 29, 2006	September 11, 2006	MTV	Darrell Taylor & Aviv Melmed
13	The Duel	Individual	17	October 12, 2006	January 18, 2007	MTV	Wes Bergmann and Jodi Weatherton
14	The Inferno 3	2 teams of 10	16	April 10, 2007	July 3, 2007	MTV	Abram Boise, Derrick Kosinski, Evelyn Smith, Janelle Casanave, Kenny Santucci & Tonya Cooley
15	The Gauntlet III	2 teams of 16	10	January 23, 2008	March 26, 2008	MTV	Frank Roessler, Jillian Zoboroski, Johanna Botta, Nehemiah Clark, Rachel Moyal & Tori Hall
16	The Island	Individual →2 teams of 4	9	September 10, 2008	November 5, 2008	MTV	Derrick Kosinski, Evelyn Smith, Johnny Devenanzio & Kenny Santucci
17	The Duel II	Individual	10	April 8, 2009	June 10, 2009	MTV	Evan Starkman and Rachel Robinson
18	The Ruins	2 teams of 14	10	September 30, 2009	December 9, 2009	MTV	Derrick Kosinski, Evan Starkman, Johnny Devenanzio, Kenny Santucci & Susie Meister
19	Fresh Meat II	13 pairs	10	April 7, 2010	June 9, 2010	MTV	Landon Lueck & Carley Johnson
20	Cutthroat	3 teams of 10	10	October 6, 2010	December 15, 2010	MTV	Brad Fiorenza, Dunbar Merrill, Tori Hall & Tyler Duckworth
21	Rivals	14 pairs	10	June 22, 2011	August 24, 2011	MTV	Johnny Devenanzio & Tyler Duckworth and Evelyn Smith & Paula Meronek
22	Battle of the Exes	13 pairs	10	January 25, 2012	March 28, 2012	MTV	Johnny Devenanzio & Camila Nakagawa
23	Battle of the Seasons	8 teams of 4	12	September 19, 2012	December 19, 2012	MTV	Ashley Kelsey, Frank Sweeney, Sam McGinn & Zach Nichols
24	Rivals II	16 pairs	12	July 10, 2013	September 25, 2013	MTV	Chris "CT" Tamburello & Wes Bergmann and Emily Schromm & Paula Meronek
25	Free Agents	Individual (Pairs/Teams)	12	April 10, 2014	June 26, 2014	MTV	Johnny "Bananas" Devenanzio and Laurel Stucky
26	Battle of the Exes II	13 pairs	12	January 6, 2015	March 24, 2015	MTV	Jordan Wiseley & Sarah Rice
27	Battle of the Bloodlines	14 pairs → 2 teams of 12 → 5 pairs	13	December 2, 2015	February 17, 2016	MTV	Cara Maria Sorbello & Jamie Banks
28	Rivals III	13 pairs	14	May 4, 2016	August 3, 2016	MTV	Johnny "Bananas" Devenanzio & Sarah Rice
29	Invasion of the Champions	Individual → 2 teams → Individual	14	February 7, 2017	May 9, 2017	MTV	Chris "CT" Tamburello and Ashley Mitchell
30	XXX: Dirty 30	Individual (Pairs/Teams)	17	July 18, 2017	November 7, 2017	MTV	Jordan Wiseley and Camila Nakagawa
31	Vendettas	Individual (Teams)	14	January 2, 2018	April 3, 2018	MTV	Cara Maria Sorbello
32	Final Reckoning	17 pairs	20	July 10, 2018	November 20, 2018	MTV	Ashley Mitchell & Hunter Barfield
33	War of the Worlds	16 pairs → Individual	16	February 6, 2019	May 22, 2019	MTV	Turabi "Turbo" Çamkıran
34	War of the Worlds 2	2 teams of 16	16	August 28, 2019	December 11, 2019	MTV	Chris "CT" Tamburello, Dee Nguyen, Jordan Wiseley & Rogan O'Connor
35	Total Madness	Individual (Pairs/Teams)	16	April 1, 2020	July 15, 2020	MTV	Jenny West and Johnny "Bananas" Devenanzio
36	Double Agents	15 pairs	19	December 9, 2020	April 21, 2021	MTV	Amber Borzotra & Chris "CT" Tamburello
37	Spies, Lies & Allies	17 pairs → 3 teams of 6 → Individual→ 3 pairs	19	August 11, 2021	December 15, 2021	MTV	Chris "CT" Tamburello & Kaycee Clark
38	Ride or Dies	17 pairs → 2 teams of 8 →7 pairs	19	October 12, 2022	February 15, 2023	MTV	Devin Walker-Molaghan & Tori Deal
39	Battle for a New Champion	Individual (Pairs/Teams)	19	October 25, 2023	February 21, 2024	MTV	Emanuel Neagu
40	40: Battle of the Eras	4 teams of 10 → Individual	19	August 14, 2024	January 8, 2025	MTV	Jenny West, Jordan Wiseley and Rachel Robinson
41	Vets & New Threats	16 pairs	19	July 30, 2025	December 3, 2025	MTV	Olivia Kaiser & Yeremi Hykel
42	Cutthroat	3 teams of 8	TBA	August 5, 2026	TBA	Paramount+	TBA

== Episodes ==
=== Season 31 (2018) ===
No. overall	No. in season	Title	Original release date	US viewers (millions)
388	1	"When Worlds Collide"	January 2, 2018	0.89
389	2	"The Power of Three"	January 9, 2018	0.87
390	3	"#banatalie"	January 16, 2018	1.02
391	4	"Pizzagate"	January 23, 2018	0.74
392	5	"Guilty by Association"	January 30, 2018	0.92
393	6	"Notes on a Scandal"	February 6, 2018	0.82
394	7	"Pulling the Strings"	February 13, 2018	0.83
395	8	"Mercenaries of Mayhem"	February 20, 2018	0.88
396	9	"Baskets of Deplorables"	February 27, 2018	0.84
397	10	"Rumor Has It"	March 6, 2018	0.77
398	11	"It's Britni, B..."	March 13, 2018	0.83
399	12	"Help Me, Rhonda"	March 20, 2018	0.75
400	13	"Czechmate"	March 27, 2018	0.83
401	14	"Vendettas Never Die"	April 3, 2018	0.90

=== Season 32 (2018) ===
No. overall	No. in season	Title	Original release date	US viewers (millions)
402	1	"Six Feet Under"	July 10, 2018	0.84
403	2	"The Young and the Wreckless"	July 17, 2018	0.82
404	3	"Crazy Ex-Girlfriend"	July 24, 2018	0.85
405	4	"The Affair"	July 31, 2018	0.73
406	5	"Breaking Brad"	August 7, 2018	0.65
407	6	"A Series of Unfortunate Events"	August 14, 2018	0.75
408	7	"Big Little Lies"	August 21, 2018	0.84
409	8	"Shaneless"	August 28, 2018	0.75
410	9	"Bro-ing Pains"	September 4, 2018	0.76
411	10	"Redemption House of Cards"	September 11, 2018	0.72
412	11	"You're The Worst"	September 18, 2018	0.81
413	12	"Unhappy Days"	September 25, 2018	0.71
414	13	"The People vs. Johnny Bananas"	October 2, 2018	0.63
415	14	"Lavender Is the New Black"	October 9, 2018	0.75
416	15	"Wheel of Fortune"	October 16, 2018	0.62
417	16	"The Leftovers"	October 23, 2018	0.76
418	17	"Scandal"	October 30, 2018	0.79
419	18	"It's Always Sunny in South Africa"	November 6, 2018	0.67
420	19	"The Walking Dead"	November 13, 2018	0.83
421	20	"Who Wants to Be a Millionaire?"	November 20, 2018	0.74

=== Season 33 (2019) ===
No. overall	No. in season	Title	Original release date	US viewers (millions)
422	1	"Apocalypse Now"	February 6, 2019	0.84
423	2	"Hellraiser"	February 13, 2019	0.78
424	3	"Casualties of War"	February 20, 2019	0.83
425	4	"It's Complicated"	February 27, 2019	0.85
426	5	"The Greatest Showman"	March 6, 2019	0.84
427	6	"In Love and War"	March 13, 2019	0.84
428	7	"This Means War"	March 20, 2019	0.95
429	8	"Liar, Liar"	March 27, 2019	1.08
430	9	"American Psycho"	April 3, 2019	0.84
431	10	"To All the Partners I've Loved Before"	April 10, 2019	0.93
432	11	"A Simple Plan"	April 17, 2019	0.76
433	12	"Lost in Translation"	April 24, 2019	0.88
434	13	"Final Destination"	May 1, 2019	0.81
435	14	"The Waterboy"	May 8, 2019	0.79
436	15	"Death Race"	May 15, 2019	0.78
437	16	"This Is the End"	May 22, 2019	1.04

=== Season 34 (2019) ===
No. overall	No. in season	Title	Original release date	US viewers (millions)
438	1	"The British Are Coming!"	August 28, 2019	0.89
439	2	"God Save the Queen"	September 4, 2019	0.69
440	3	"United We Stand, Divided We Fall"	September 11, 2019	0.75
441	4	"Benedict Laurel"	September 18, 2019	0.72
442	5	"In Paulie We Trust"	September 25, 2019	0.60
443	6	"One Nation Under Leroy"	October 2, 2019	0.84
444	7	"Zero Dark Turbo"	October 9, 2019	0.79
445	8	"Saving Private Esther"	October 16, 2019	0.65
446	9	"The Royal Rumble"	October 23, 2019	0.73
447	10	"Infinity War"	October 30, 2019	0.65
448	11	"All Is Fair In Love And War"	November 6, 2019	0.67
449	12	"The Right Honorable Rogan"	November 13, 2019	0.57
450	13	"Dee-Day"	November 20, 2019	0.70
451	14	"Declaration of Independence"	November 27, 2019	0.80
452	15	"A Tale of Two Countries"	December 4, 2019	0.82
453	16	"Give Me Liberty or Give Me Cash"	December 11, 2019	0.83

=== Season 35 (2020) ===
No. overall	No. in season	Title	Original release date	US viewers (millions)
454	1	"Mad World"	April 1, 2020	1.06
455	2	"Sweet Dreams Are Made of Dee"	April 8, 2020	0.93
456	3	"A Hard Jay's Night"	April 15, 2020	0.92
457	4	"Karma Chameleon"	April 22, 2020	1.02
458	5	"Break Up With Your BF, I'm Bored"	April 29, 2020	1.00
459	6	"Love Will Tear Us Apart"	May 6, 2020	0.93
460	7	"Should I Stay Or Should I Go?"	May 13, 2020	0.85
461	8	"Live and Let Die"	May 20, 2020	1.02
462	9	"Backstabber"	May 27, 2020	0.93
463	10	"The Final Countdown"	June 3, 2020	0.91
464	11	"You Ain't Right"	June 10, 2020	0.88
465	12	"Pictures of You"	June 17, 2020	0.90
466	13	"Victim of Love"	June 24, 2020	0.94
467	14	"Your Time Is Gonna Come"	July 1, 2020	0.85
468	15	"Crash Into Me"	July 8, 2020	0.94
469	16	"It's the End of the World As We Know It"	July 15, 2020	0.98

=== Season 36 (2020–2021) ===
No. overall	No. in season	Title	Original release date	US viewers (millions)
470	1	"License to Killer Kam"	December 9, 2020	0.90
471	2	"Dive Another Day"	December 16, 2020	0.84
472	3	"Enemy of the State"	December 23, 2020	0.79
473	4	"Duplicity"	January 6, 2021	0.82
474	5	"Skyfall"	January 13, 2021	0.77
475	6	"From Theresa With Love"	January 20, 2021	0.88
476	7	"Die Another Jay"	January 27, 2021	0.99
477	8	"A Muddy Matter"	February 3, 2021	0.92
478	9	"Lady Vengeance"	February 10, 2021	0.97
479	10	"A Clockwork Amber"	February 17, 2021	0.89
480	11	"An Inconvenient Goof"	February 24, 2021	0.76
481	12	"Tinker, Tailer, Bunny, Spy"	March 3, 2021	0.89
482	13	"The Spy Who Loved Fessy"	March 10, 2021	0.93
483	14	"The Best of Enemies"	March 17, 2021	0.89
484	15	"Never Say Never Again"	March 24, 2021	0.96
485	16	"A Most Wanted Man"	March 31, 2021	0.91
486	17	"True Lies"	April 7, 2021	0.90
487	18	"No Time To Die"	April 14, 2021	0.93
488	19	"The World Is Not Enough"	April 21, 2021	0.99

=== Season 37 (2021) ===
No. overall	No. in season	Title	Original release date	US viewers (millions)
489	1	"The List"	August 11, 2021	0.66
490	2	"Bertha"	August 18, 2021	0.62
491	3	"Truce or Dare"	August 25, 2021	0.51
492	4	"Messy"	September 1, 2021	0.50
493	5	"Good Vibes and Gladiator"	September 8, 2021	0.59
494	6	"Alien"	September 15, 2021	0.71
495	7	"Uncle CT"	September 22, 2021	0.61
496	8	"The Threat"	September 29, 2021	0.65
497	9	"The War"	October 6, 2021	0.55
498	10	"Precious Stones"	October 13, 2021	0.67
499	11	"Mucus Plug"	October 20, 2021	0.61
500	12	"500"	October 27, 2021	0.62
501	13	"Titanic"	November 3, 2021	0.68
502	14	"Mavericks"	November 10, 2021	0.60
503	15	"The Cave of The Wolf"	November 17, 2021	0.63
504	16	"Riverdance"	November 24, 2021	0.71
505	17	"Drop Dead"	December 1, 2021	0.68
506	18	"Night of Mistakes"	December 8, 2021	0.66
507	19	"The Decision"	December 15, 2021	0.72

=== Season 38 (2022–2023) ===
No. overall	No. in season	Title	Original release date	US viewers (millions)
508	1	"Don't Die for Me, Argentina"	October 12, 2022	0.42
509	2	"Friend or Faux"	October 19, 2022	0.42
510	3	"A Bumpy Ride"	October 26, 2022	0.49
511	4	"O'liv'n on the Edge"	November 2, 2022	0.46
512	5	"Get Rich or Ride or Die Tryin'"	November 9, 2022	0.47
513	6	"Come Michele or High Water"	November 16, 2022	0.50
514	7	"Deep Web"	November 23, 2022	0.47
515	8	"Born to Ride or Die"	November 30, 2022	0.52
516	9	"Split Decision"	December 7, 2022	0.56
517	10	"Dancing on My Own"	December 14, 2022	0.56
518	11	"Nelly: Ride (or Die) Wit Me"	December 21, 2022	0.66
519	12	"Frenemy of the State"	December 28, 2022	0.55
520	13	"Blind Faith"	January 4, 2023	0.52
521	14	"Terrorist of Love"	January 11, 2023	0.56
522	15	"Knot a Problem"	January 18, 2023	0.64
523	16	"Friends or Froze"	January 25, 2023	0.64
524	17	"Riders on the Storm"	February 1, 2023	0.55
525	18	"The Hours"	February 8, 2023	0.67
526	19	"The End of the Ride"	February 15, 2023	0.67

=== Season 39 (2023–2024) ===
No. overall	No. in season	Title	Original release date	US viewers (millions)
527	1	"Teamwork Makes The Perfect Work"	October 25, 2023	0.34
528	2	"Two Lungs, One Heart, Can't Lose"	November 1, 2023	0.31
529	3	"It's a Matter of Semantics"	November 8, 2023	0.29
530	4	"I'm Coming Out"	November 8, 2023	0.19
531	5	"Countdown to Chaos"	November 15, 2023	0.39
532	6	"The Big Mistake"	November 22, 2023	0.38
533	7	"So Flip Floppy"	November 29, 2023	0.41
534	8	"Struggling to Hold It Together"	December 6, 2023	0.42
535	9	"A Banana Split"	December 13, 2023	0.39
536	10	"Feeling Used"	December 20, 2023	0.36
537	11	"My Own Worst Frenemy"	December 27, 2023	0.45
538	12	"A Legend Returns"	January 3, 2024	0.50
539	13	"El Saboteur"	January 10, 2024	0.53
540	14	"Don't Let TJ Decide"	January 17, 2024	0.49
541	15	"Welcome to Conquest"	January 24, 2024	0.48
542	16	"Family Knows Best"	January 31, 2024	0.48
543	17	"Feel the Bern"	February 7, 2024	0.46
544	18	"The Beginning of the End"	February 14, 2024	0.52
545	19	"Only One Gets the Crown"	February 21, 2024	0.51

=== Season 40 (2024–2025) ===
No. overall	No. in season	Title	Original release date	US viewers (millions)
546	1	"The Era Invitational, Part 1"	August 14, 2024	0.43
547	2	"The Era Invitational, Part 2"	August 21, 2024	0.47
548	3	"A Fatal Era"	August 28, 2024	0.41
549	4	"My Trivia Era"	September 4, 2024	0.48
550	5	"An Era Tradition"	September 18, 2024	0.41
551	6	"My Real Friends Era"	September 25, 2024	0.38
552	7	"Trust in Your Era"	October 2, 2024	0.52
553	8	"The Era of the Gladiator"	October 9, 2024	0.38
554	9	"An Era of One"	October 16, 2024	0.38
555	10	"A New Era"	October 23, 2024	0.40
556	11	"Payback Era"	October 30, 2024	0.40
557	12	"The Era of the Purge"	November 6, 2024	0.42
558	13	"Best Friends 4Era"	November 13, 2024	0.42
559	14	"Swinging Era"	November 20, 2024	0.34
560	15	"Thinking Thin Era"	December 4, 2024	0.48
561	16	"Must Win Era"	December 11, 2024	0.45
562	17	"Location Change Era"	December 18, 2024	0.42
563	18	"The End of An Era, Part 1"	January 1, 2025	0.42
564	19	"The End of An Era, Part 2"	January 8, 2025	0.57

=== Season 41 (2025) ===
No. overall	No. in season	Title	Original release date	US viewers (millions)
565	1	"Welcome to The Challenge"	July 30, 2025	0.24
566	2	"We Used to Hook Up"	August 6, 2025	0.25
567	3	"I Am The Challenge"	August 13, 2025	0.32
568	4	"Wish I'd Been Practicing"	August 20, 2025	0.59
569	5	"Pride Comes Before the Fall"	August 27, 2025	0.30
570	6	"Is He Throwing It?"	September 3, 2025	0.36
571	7	"At Least Someone's Getting Laid!"	September 10, 2025	0.41
572	8	"Justice for Leka"	September 17, 2025	0.21
573	9	"Does Anyone Want to Confess?"	September 24, 2025	0.31
574	10	"A War Brewing"	October 1, 2025	0.31
575	11	"A King of Kamikaze"	October 8, 2025	0.24
576	12	"Punch You in Your Face"	October 15, 2025	0.24
577	13	"They Are Like Cockroaches"	October 22, 2025	0.24
578	14	"We Have to Boogie!"	October 29, 2025	0.27
579	15	"The Best Birthday Present"	November 5, 2025	0.30
580	16	"Am I Being Bamboozled?"	November 12, 2025	0.32
581	17	"Ten Toes Down"	November 19, 2025	0.32
582	18	"Finale Part I"	November 26, 2025	0.24
583	19	"Finale Part II"	December 3, 2025	0.35

=== Season 42 (2026) ===
No. overall	No. in season	Title	Original release date
584	1	TBA	August 5, 2026
