= The Challenge (TV series) =

Reality competition show

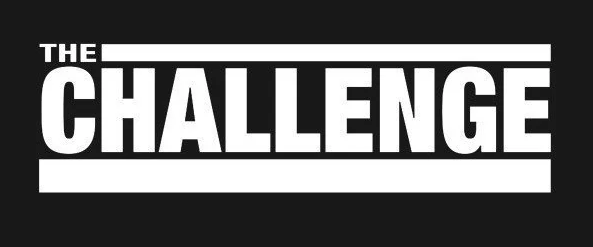
- Also known as: Road Rules: All Stars; Real World/Road Rules Challenge
- Genre: Reality competition
- Created by: Mary-Ellis Bunim; Jonathan Murray
- Presented by: Eric Nies; Mark Long; Jonny Moseley; Dave Mirra; T. J. Lavin
- Starring: The Challenge contestants
- Country of origin: United States
- Original language: English
- No. of seasons: 42
- No. of episodes: 597 (list of episodes)

Production
- Executive producers: Fred Birckhead; Justin Booth; Lisa Fletcher; Scott Freeman; Gil Goldschein; Emer Harkin; Kevin Lee; Julie Pizzi; Ryan Smith; Danny Wascou
- Running time: 30 minutes; 60 minutes; 90 minutes
- Production companies: Bunim/Murray Productions; MTV Entertainment Studios; Paramount Television Studios

Original release
- Network: MTV
- Release: April 20, 1998 – December 17, 2025
- Network: Paramount+
- Release: August 5, 2026 – present

Related
- The Real World; Road Rules; The Challenge: All Stars; The Challenge: USA; The Challenge: World Championship

The Challenge (originally known as Road Rules: All Stars, followed by Real World/Road Rules Challenge) is a reality competition show that is a spin-off of two of the network's reality shows, The Real World and Road Rules. The series premiered on MTV on April 20, 1998 and moved to Paramount+ for its forty-second season. The series showcases contestants competing against one another in various challenges to avoid elimination, with the winners typically sharing a cash prize. The Challenge is currently hosted by T. J. Lavin.

The show was originally titled Road Rules: All Stars, and had notable Real World alumni participated in a Road Rules style road-trip. It was renamed Real World/Road Rules Challenge for its second season, then later abridged to simply The Challenge by the show's nineteenth season. Since the fourth season, each season has supplied the show with a unique subtitle, such as Rivals.

The show's forty-second season, titled Cutthroat, premiered on August 5, 2026.

== Overview ==
The Challenge's cast varies from season to season. Contestants used to originate from either The Real World or Road Rules. Casting for The Challenge has expanded over the years to include contestants who debuted on The Challenge itself, and other MTV franchises. Starting in 2018, new contestants were chosen outside of the MTV network programming. Many recent alumni come from various reality shows including Survivor, The Amazing Race, Are You the One?, Big Brother, Ex on the Beach, Vanderpump Rules and Love Island as well as non-reality entertainment and sports programs.

A season's typical multitude of cast members are usually divided up into separate teams or pairs according to a certain criterion, which varies from season to season. The criteria that teams have been arranged by over the show's history have ranged from: gender, the contestants' original show, heroic or villainous status, rivalries, countries, family members and ex-romantic partners. The format of the competition varies by season. In elimination rounds, contestants or teams compete against each other to determine who is eliminated from the season. Each season has its own, distinctive elimination round.

Some seasons, however, have used entirely different formats from the typical ones: The Island in particular adopted many features atypical to Real World/Road Rules Challenge, instead taking concepts like that of another reality television game show Survivor; as another example, the first season (Road Rules: All Stars) only included contestants from The Real World and consisted of a much smaller cast before the show was completely restructured in its second season. Except for season one, a monetary prize has always been awarded for winning the final mission.

== Hosts ==
The series initially used no hosts but instead a former cast member who had been kicked off his or her season, providing assignments as "Mr." or "Ms. Big" (David "Puck" Rainey, David Edwards, and Gladys Sanabria served this role). After one season without anyone in this role, the series began using hosts: Eric Nies and Mark Long co-hosted a season, and Jonny Moseley and Dave Mirra hosted various seasons before T. J. Lavin became the show's regular host by the eleventh season.

== History ==
Over time, a playful rivalry developed between the cast of Road Rules and The Real World, with the former occasionally attempting to prank the latter while it was in production. During the filming of The Real World: Boston and Road Rules: Islands, the two casts met while the Real World cast was vacationing in San Juan, Puerto Rico. Producers set up a face-off where both teams would compete for a cash prize. The episode brought in high ratings and this set ideas in motion to produce the spin-off series. The series started airing in April 1998 as Road Rules: All Stars, and featured cast members from five seasons of The Real World. Another face-off called AquaGames, hosted by Kit Hoover and Mark Long, was between The Real World: Seattle and Road Rules: Down Under and aired as part of those shows later in 1998.

After Road Rules: All Stars, producers decided to include former cast members of Road Rules in the series as well. In the next season, two six-member teams were sent around the world in a competition to see which show could best the other in head-to-head competition. The series followed the format for three years. Following the successful boom of reality television in the new millennium, from shows like Survivor, producers decided to add new elements to the series. 2002's Battle of the Seasons was the first season to depart from the previous six-member structure and brought in a large group of former cast members to compete in one location. The show added in eliminations, with earlier season incorporated voting off by majority, that eventually changed to elimination competitions between cast members.

== Series overview ==
Season	Title	Format	Location	Episodes	Originally released			Champion(s)
Season	Title	Format	Location	Episodes	First released	Last released	Network	Champion(s)
1	Road Rules: All Stars	1 team of 5	Various (Road trip)	5	April 20, 1998	May 18, 1998	MTV	Cynthia Roberts, Eric Nies, Jon Brennan, Rachel Campos & Sean Duffy
2	Real World/Road Rules Challenge	2 teams of 6	Various (Road trip)	6	November 9, 1999	December 14, 1999	MTV	Anne Wharton, Kalle Dedolph, Kefla Hare, Mark Long, Noah Rickun & Roni Martin
3	Challenge 2000	2 teams of 6	Various (Road trip)	11	January 17, 2000	April 3, 2000	MTV	Carlos "Los" Jackson, Dan Setzler, Holly Shand, Piggy Thomas, Veronica Portillo & Yes Duffy
4	Extreme Challenge	2 teams of 6	Various (Road trip)	17	January 9, 2001	May 1, 2001	MTV	Dan Renzi, Jamie Murray, Julie Stoffer, Kameelah Phillips, Rebecca Lord & Syrus Yarbrough
5	Battle of the Seasons	2 teams of 8 pairs	Cabo San Lucas, Mexico	15	February 4, 2002	May 20, 2002	MTV	Danny Roberts & Kelley Limp, Mike Mizanin & Coral Smith; Sean Duffy & Elka Walker
6	Battle of the Sexes	2 teams of 18	Montego Bay, Jamaica	18	January 6, 2003	May 5, 2003	MTV	Colin Mortensen, Jamie Murray & Mark Long
7	The Gauntlet	2 teams of 14	Telluride, Colorado	16	September 29, 2003	January 26, 2004	MTV	Adam Larson, Cara Zavaleta, Darrell Taylor, Dave Giuntoli, Rachel Robinson, Roni Martin, Sarah Greyson, Theo Vonkurnatowski & Veronica Portillo
8	The Inferno	2 teams of 10	Acapulco, Mexico	19	February 2, 2004	May 31, 2004	MTV	Abram Boise, Christena Pyle, Darrell Taylor, Holly Shand, Katie Doyle, Kendal Sheppard, Timmy Beggy & Veronica Portillo
9	Battle of the Sexes 2	2 teams of 18	Santa Fe, New Mexico	17	October 4, 2004	January 31, 2005	MTV	Dan Setzler, Eric Nies & Theo Vonkurnatowski
10	The Inferno II	2 teams of 10	Manzanillo, Mexico	16	March 7, 2005	June 20, 2005	MTV	Darrell Taylor, Jamie Chung, Landon Lueck & Mike Mizanin
11	The Gauntlet 2	2 teams of 16	Tobago, Trinidad and Tobago	18	December 5, 2005	March 27, 2006	MTV	Alton Williams, Ibis Nieves, Jamie Murray, Jodi Weatherton, Kina Dean, Landon Lueck, MJ Garrett, Randy Barry & Susie Meister
12	Fresh Meat	12 pairs	Myocum, Australia	16	May 29, 2006	September 11, 2006	MTV	Darrell Taylor & Aviv Melmed
13	The Duel	Individual	Armação dos Búzios, Brazil	17	October 12, 2006	January 18, 2007	MTV	Wes Bergmann and Jodi Weatherton
14	The Inferno 3	2 teams of 10	Somerset West, South Africa	16	April 10, 2007	July 3, 2007	MTV	Abram Boise, Derrick Kosinski, Evelyn Smith, Janelle Casanave, Kenny Santucci & Tonya Cooley
15	The Gauntlet III	2 teams of 16	Puerto Vallarta, Mexico	10	January 23, 2008	March 26, 2008	MTV	Frank Roessler, Jillian Zoboroski, Johanna Botta, Nehemiah Clark, Rachel Moyal & Tori Hall
16	The Island	Individual → 2 teams of 4	Colón Island, Panama	9	September 10, 2008	November 5, 2008	MTV	Derrick Kosinski, Evelyn Smith, Johnny Devenanzio & Kenny Santucci
17	The Duel II	Individual	Queenstown, New Zealand	10	April 8, 2009	June 10, 2009	MTV	Evan Starkman and Rachel Robinson
18	The Ruins	2 teams of 14	Phuket, Thailand	10	September 30, 2009	December 9, 2009	MTV	Derrick Kosinski, Evan Starkman, Johnny Devenanzio, Kenny Santucci & Susie Meister
19	Fresh Meat II	13 pairs	Whistler, British Columbia, Canada	10	April 7, 2010	June 9, 2010	MTV	Landon Lueck & Carley Johnson
20	Cutthroat	3 teams of 10	Prague, Czech Republic	10	October 6, 2010	December 15, 2010	MTV	Brad Fiorenza, Dunbar Merrill, Tori Hall & Tyler Duckworth
21	Rivals	14 pairs	Dominical, Costa Rica → Buenos Aires & Bariloche, Argentina	10	June 22, 2011	August 24, 2011	MTV	Johnny Devenanzio & Tyler Duckworth and Evelyn Smith & Paula Meronek
22	Battle of the Exes	13 pairs	Sosúa, Dominican Republic → Reykjavík, Iceland	10	January 25, 2012	March 28, 2012	MTV	Johnny Devenanzio & Camila Nakagawa
23	Battle of the Seasons	8 teams of 4	Bodrum, Turkey → Swakopmund & Windhoek, Namibia	12	September 19, 2012	December 19, 2012	MTV	Ashley Kelsey, Frank Sweeney, Sam McGinn & Zach Nichols
24	Rivals II	16 pairs	Phuket, Thailand	12	July 10, 2013	September 25, 2013	MTV	Chris "CT" Tamburello & Wes Bergmann and Emily Schromm & Paula Meronek
25	Free Agents	Individual (Pairs/Teams)	Punta del Este, Uruguay → Pucón, Chile	12	April 10, 2014	June 26, 2014	MTV	Johnny "Bananas" Devenanzio and Laurel Stucky
26	Battle of the Exes II	13 pairs	Pedasí, Panama → Ørsta, Norway	12	January 6, 2015	March 24, 2015	MTV	Jordan Wiseley & Sarah Rice
27	Battle of the Bloodlines	14 pairs → 2 teams of 12 → 5 pairs	Bodrum, Turkey → Berlin, Germany	13	December 2, 2015	February 17, 2016	MTV	Cara Maria Sorbello & Jamie Banks
28	Rivals III	13 pairs	Huatulco, Mexico → Mendoza, Argentina	14	May 4, 2016	August 3, 2016	MTV	Johnny "Bananas" Devenanzio & Sarah Rice
29	Invasion of the Champions	Individual → 2 teams → Individual	Krabi, Thailand	14	February 7, 2017	May 9, 2017	MTV	Chris "CT" Tamburello and Ashley Mitchell
30	XXX: Dirty 30	Individual (Pairs/Teams)	Cartagena, Colombia → Salta, Argentina	17	July 18, 2017	November 7, 2017	MTV	Jordan Wiseley and Camila Nakagawa
31	Vendettas	Individual (Teams)	Gibraltar, BOT & Marbella, Spain → Prague, Czech Republic	14	January 2, 2018	April 3, 2018	MTV	Cara Maria Sorbello
32	Final Reckoning	17 pairs	Hermanus, South Africa	20	July 10, 2018	November 20, 2018	MTV	Ashley Mitchell & Hunter Barfield
33	War of the Worlds	16 pairs → Individual	Swakopmund, Namibia	16	February 6, 2019	May 22, 2019	MTV	Turabi "Turbo" Çamkıran
34	War of the Worlds 2	2 teams of 16	Chiang Mai and Phuket, Thailand	16	August 28, 2019	December 11, 2019	MTV	Chris "CT" Tamburello, Dee Nguyen, Jordan Wiseley & Rogan O'Connor
35	Total Madness	Individual (Pairs/Teams)	Prague, Czech Republic → Central Eastern Alps, Austria	16	April 1, 2020	July 15, 2020	MTV	Jenny West and Johnny "Bananas" Devenanzio
36	Double Agents	15 pairs	Reykjavík, Iceland	19	December 9, 2020	April 21, 2021	MTV	Amber Borzotra & Chris "CT" Tamburello
37	Spies, Lies & Allies	17 pairs → 3 teams of 6 → Individual→ 3 pairs	Vrsar, Croatia	19	August 11, 2021	December 15, 2021	MTV	Chris "CT" Tamburello & Kaycee Clark
38	Ride or Dies	17 pairs → 2 teams of 8 →7 pairs	Buenos Aires, Argentina	19	October 12, 2022	February 15, 2023	MTV	Devin Walker-Molaghan & Tori Deal
39	Battle for a New Champion	Individual (Pairs/Teams)	Pula, Croatia	19	October 25, 2023	February 21, 2024	MTV	Emanuel Neagu
40	40: Battle of the Eras	4 teams of 10 → Individual	Ho Chi Minh City, Vietnam → Palawan, Philippines	19	August 14, 2024	January 8, 2025	MTV	Jenny West, Jordan Wiseley and Rachel Robinson
41	Vets & New Threats	16 pairs	Santiago & Andes Mountains, Chile	19	July 30, 2025	December 3, 2025	MTV	Olivia Kaiser & Yeremi Hykel
42	Cutthroat	3 teams of 8 → 2 teams of 6	Bangkok & Chonburi, Thailand	14	August 5, 2026	October 28, 2026	Paramount+	Johnny "Bananas" Devenanzio, Chris "CT" Tamburello, Michele Fitzgerald, Tori Deal & Will Gagnon

== Spin-offs ==
=== The Challenge: Champs vs. Stars ===
The Challenge: Champs vs. Stars (originally known as The Challenge: Champs vs. Pros) is a special recurring mini-series of The Challenge. In each multi-week event, alumni from The Challenge compete against celebrities to win money for charity.

Order	Title	Host	Format	Original Release	Location	Winner(s)
1	Champs vs. Pros	Victor Cruz	2 teams of 10 → 3 pairs	May 16 – June 20, 2017	Los Angeles, California	Cara Maria Sorbello & Darrell Taylor
2	Champs vs. Stars I	Mike "The Miz" Mizanin	2 teams of 10	November 21, 2017 – January 9, 2018	Los Angeles, California	Champs (Chris "CT" Tamburello, Emily Schromm & Johnny "Bananas" Devenanzio)
3	Champs vs. Stars II	Mike "The Miz" Mizanin	2 teams of 10 → 7 pairs	April 17 – June 26, 2018	Los Angeles, California	Chris "CT" Tamburello & Tony Raines

=== The Challenge: All Stars ===
In 2020, Road Rules: USA – The First Adventure alumnus Mark Long started asking his social media followers if they'd be interested in seeing former cast members of The Challenge coming together for a new version of the series. The movement was titled "We Want OGs." After his idea went viral, he announced a partnership with Bunim/Murray Productions to further develop his project and began gauging interest from potential former cast members. On February 24, 2021, the show was officially announced as The Challenge: All Stars.

Season	Subtitle	Format	Contestants	Location	Episodes	Originally released			Champion(s)
Season	Subtitle	Format	Contestants	Location	Episodes	First released	Last released	Network	Champion(s)
1	—N/a	Individual (Pairs/Teams)	22	Andes Mountains, Argentina	9	April 1, 2021	May 27, 2021	Paramount+	Yes Duffy
2	—N/a	Individual → 8 pairs	24	Cancún, Mexico	10	November 11, 2021	January 13, 2022	Paramount+	Jonna Mannion & MJ Garrett
3	—N/a	Individual (Pairs)	25	Panama City & San José Island, Panama	10	May 11, 2022	July 6, 2022	Paramount+	Wes Bergmann and Jonna Mannion
4	—N/a	Individual (Pairs/Teams)	25	Cape Town, South Africa	12	April 10, 2024	June 19, 2024	Paramount+	Laurel Stucky
5	Rivals	13 pairs	26	Ho Chi Minh City, Vietnam	12	January 29, 2025	April 16, 2025	MTV	Adam Larson & Steve Meinke

=== The Challenge: World Championship & International versions ===
In February 2022, different series of The Challenge were announced, this included three international adaptations for Australia, Argentina, the UK, as well as The Challenge: USA, another American series which aired on CBS with CBS reality show alumni. All editions of the series aired locally on a Paramount-affiliated network and were available globally to stream on Paramount+. These four series were followed by The Challenge: World Championship, which features winners and notable players from the international adaptations and the main series of The Challenge competing for a grand prize. On May 22, 2023, following the conclusion of World Championship, CBS announced that a second season of The Challenge: USA would premiere on August 10, 2023. On June 27, 2024, it was announced that a Swedish version of The Challenge would be airing on TV4 starting on August 12, 2024, marking the first series in the franchise to be produced outside of Bunim/Murray Productions. A second Swedish season was scheduled to premiere in November 2026, but was postponed to 2027 due to a technical issue requiring the season to be re-edited.

Versions

Country	Title	Host(s)	Network	Format	Original Release	Location	Winner(s)
United States	USA	T. J. Lavin	CBS	Individual; Pairs	July 6 – September 14, 2022	Buenos Aires & Patagonia, Argentina	Danny McCray
United States	USA	T. J. Lavin	CBS	Individual; Pairs	July 6 – September 14, 2022	Buenos Aires & Patagonia, Argentina	Sarah Lacina
United States	USA 2	T. J. Lavin	CBS	3 teams of 8 →Individual	August 10 – October 19, 2023	Pula, Croatia	Chris Underwood
United States	USA 2	T. J. Lavin	CBS	3 teams of 8 →Individual	August 10 – October 19, 2023	Pula, Croatia	Desi Williams
Australia	Australia	Brihony Dawson	Network 10	Individual; Pairs	November 14 – December 13, 2022	Buenos Aires & Pilar, Argentina	Kiki Morris
Australia	Australia	Brihony Dawson	Network 10	Individual; Pairs	November 14 – December 13, 2022	Buenos Aires & Pilar, Argentina	Troy Cullen
Argentina	Argentina: El Desafio	Marley	Telefe	Individual; Pairs	February 13 – March 7, 2023	Buenos Aires & Pilar, Argentina	Sol Pérez
United Kingdom	UK	Mark Wright	Channel 5	Individual; Pairs	February 20 – 24, 2023	Buenos Aires, Argentina	Kaz Crossley
United Kingdom	UK	Mark Wright	Channel 5	Individual; Pairs	February 20 – 24, 2023	Buenos Aires, Argentina	Tristan Phipps
Global	World Championship	Brihony Dawson; Marley; Mark Wright; T. J. Lavin	Paramount+	14 pairs	March 8 – May 17, 2023	Cape Town, South Africa	Team UK (Jordan Wiseley & Kaz Crossley)
Sweden	Sverige (season 1)	Pischa Strindstedt	TV4	Pairs	August 12 – October 10, 2024	Larnaca, Cyprus	Jens Rönnqvist & Sandra Cucarano
Sweden	Sverige (season 2)	Ahmed Berhan	TV4	4 teams	Spring 2027	Furillen, Sweden	

== Specials ==
=== Spring Break Challenge ===
In March 2010, prior to the airing of the 19th season, MTV aired a special spring break spin-off of The Challenge filmed at the Playa Suites Hotel in Acapulco, Mexico. The five-episode spin-off was titled Spring Break Challenge and aired from March 22–26, 2010. The season featured seven Challenge alum who coached teams of college-aged friends through various challenges and elimination rounds in an attempt to win $50,000 in cash and prizes. Fresh Meat alumnus Evan Starkman and The Real World: Key West alumna Paula Meronek served as broadcasters, with T. J. Lavin as the host. Camila Nakagawa, a contestant of the winning team, went on to appear on future challenges, with her debut season being Cutthroat. Nakagawa is the only player to appear on the main series.

Coach	Original season	Finish
Susie Meister	Road Rules: Down Under	Winner
Kenny Santucci	Real World/Road Rules Challenge: Fresh Meat	Runner-up
Wes Bergmann	The Real World: Austin	Third place
Darrell Taylor	Road Rules: Campus Crawl	Episode 4
Landon Lueck	The Real World: Philadelphia	Episode 3
Evelyn Smith	Real World/Road Rules Challenge: Fresh Meat	Episode 2
Rachel Robinson	Road Rules: Campus Crawl	Episode 1

=== The Challenge: CT's Getting Married ===
The Challenge: CT's Getting Married is a two-part special revolving around the wedding of Challenge star Chris "CT" Tamburello and Lilianet Solares. MTV released the trailer and premiere date on November 20, 2018. The two-week special premiered on December 11, 2018, and concluded on December 18, 2018.

=== The Challenge: Untold History ===
The Challenge: Untold History is a six-part documentary about The Challenge. It featured over 30 former competitors and several celebrity fans, discussing the show and telling behind the scenes stories. It premiered on September 21, 2022, on MTV. A sneak preview was shown during the Unscripted portion of the 2022 MTV Movie & TV Awards.

=== The Challenge: Home Turf ===
The Challenge: Home Turf is a YouTube docuseries which premiered on January 29, 2024. The docuseries focuses on eight cast members visiting their hometown and sharing stories about their career and upbringing.
