= The Challenge: All Stars =

Reality competition show

- Genre: Reality competition
- Created by: Mary-Ellis Bunim; Jonathan Murray
- Inspired by: The Challenge
- Presented by: T. J. Lavin
- Country of origin: United States
- Original language: English
- No. of seasons: 5
- No. of episodes: 53

Production
- Executive producers: Julie Pizzi; Justin Booth; Dan Caster; Mark Long; Leanne Mucci; Jack Reifert; Fred Birckhead; Ryan Smith
- Production companies: Bunim/Murray Productions; MTV Entertainment Studios

Original release
- Network: Paramount+
- Release: April 1, 2021 – June 19, 2024
- Network: MTV
- Release: January 29, 2025 – present

Related
- The Real World; Road Rules; The Challenge; The Challenge: World Championship

The Challenge: All Stars is a spinoff series of the reality competition show The Challenge, which premiered on Paramount+ on April 1, 2021.

== Production ==
The series originally was pitched by Mark Long on social media for a season with "old-school" cast members. His pitch went viral in June 2020, and he started reaching out to former cast members and eventually to The Challenge's production company, Bunim/Murray Productions. In August 2020, Long and Bunim/Murray official announced a partnership to work together on this series. Along with being a cast member, Long was also an executive producer. Other executive producers include Julie Pizzi, Justin Booth, Dan Caster and Leanne Mucci, with Jack Reifert as co-executive producer.

On February 24, 2021, the show was officially announced as The Challenge: All Stars, and premiered on the streaming service on April 1, 2021. On October 13, 2021, the series was renewed for a second season, which premiered on November 11, 2021. The series was then renewed for a third season, which premiered on May 11, 2022.

A fourth season, which premiered on April 10, 2024, was filmed in early 2023 in South Africa. For the first time in the series, the cast also included a cast member who originally debuted on Are You the One?.

On December 18, 2024, the fifth season was announced with a "Rivals" theme. Additionally, it was revealed that the season would premiere on MTV on January 29, 2025, and that casting was furtherly expanding, including cast member from Big Brother, Ex on the Beach, Survivor, Shipwrecked and 12 Dates of Christmas.

== Seasons ==
=== Series overview ===
Season	Subtitle	Format	Contestants	Location	Episodes	Originally released			Champion(s)
Season	Subtitle	Format	Contestants	Location	Episodes	First released	Last released	Network	Champion(s)
1	—N/a	Individual (Pairs/Teams)	22	Andes Mountains, Argentina	9	April 1, 2021	May 27, 2021	Paramount+	Yes Duffy
2	—N/a	Individual → 8 pairs	24	Cancún, Mexico	10	November 11, 2021	January 13, 2022	Paramount+	Jonna Mannion & MJ Garrett
3	—N/a	Individual (Pairs)	25	Panama City & San José Island, Panama	10	May 11, 2022	July 6, 2022	Paramount+	Wes Bergmann and Jonna Mannion
4	—N/a	Individual (Pairs/Teams)	25	Cape Town, South Africa	12	April 10, 2024	June 19, 2024	Paramount+	Laurel Stucky
5	Rivals	13 pairs	26	Ho Chi Minh City, Vietnam	12	January 29, 2025	April 16, 2025	MTV	Adam Larson & Steve Meinke

=== Season 1 (2021) ===
No. overall	No. in season	Title	Original release date
1	1	"Legends Never Die"	April 1, 2021
2	2	"All That You Can't Leave Behind"	April 8, 2021
3	3	"I've Got the Power"	April 15, 2021
4	4	"Semi-Charmed Lifesaver"	April 22, 2021
5	5	"Nuthin' but an OG Thang"	April 29, 2021
6	6	"Free Fallin'"	May 6, 2021
7	7	"What About Your Friends?"	May 13, 2021
8	8	"Mo Money Mo Problems"	May 20, 2021
9	9	"You're the Best Around"	May 27, 2021

=== Season 2 (2021–22) ===
No. overall	No. in season	Title	Original release date
10	1	"One More Time"	November 11, 2021
11	2	"It's So Hard To Say Goodbye"	November 18, 2021
12	3	"Firestarter"	November 25, 2021
13	4	"New Divide"	December 2, 2021
14	5	"Old Tina Can't Come to the Phone"	December 9, 2021
15	6	"A Whole New World"	December 16, 2021
16	7	"Save the Palace"	December 23, 2021
17	8	"(You Drive Me) Crazy"	December 30, 2021
18	9	"Break Stuff"	January 6, 2022
19	10	"It Takes Two"	January 13, 2022

=== Season 3 (2022) ===
No. overall	No. in season	Title	Original release date
20	1	"An All Star Is Born"	May 11, 2022
21	2	"You've Been Sabotaged!"	May 11, 2022
22	3	"Treehouse of Horror"	May 18, 2022
23	4	"She's Back!"	May 25, 2022
24	5	"More Than Friends?"	June 1, 2022
25	6	"Revenge of the All Stars"	June 8, 2022
26	7	"Let's Make a Deal"	June 15, 2022
27	8	"Going Bananas"	June 22, 2022
28	9	"Cheater! Cheater!"	June 29, 2022
29	10	"Coming for the Crown"	July 6, 2022

=== Season 4 (2024) ===
No. overall	No. in season	Title	Original release date
30	1	"A Sky Full of Stars"	April 10, 2024
31	2	"You Won't Break My Soul"	April 10, 2024
32	3	"True Colors"	April 17, 2024
33	4	"Starget"	April 24, 2024
34	5	"The Way You Make Me Steal"	May 1, 2024
35	6	"Karma Maria"	May 8, 2024
36	7	"Catch a Falling Star"	May 15, 2024
37	8	"The Queen's Gambit"	May 22, 2024
38	9	"Waiting For a Star to Fall"	May 29, 2024
39	10	"It Was a Good Jay"	June 5, 2024
40	11	"Live Free or Die Starred"	June 12, 2024
41	12	"Lone Star"	June 19, 2024

=== Season 5: Rivals (2025) ===
No. overall	No. in season	Title	Original release date	US viewers (millions)
42	1	"A Star Studded Ar-Rival"	January 29, 2025	0.31
43	2	"Rivals on the Edge"	February 5, 2025	0.25
44	3	"Rivals in the Ruff"	February 12, 2025	0.40
45	4	"Ring Around the Rival"	February 19, 2025	0.34
46	5	"Tri–Rival Pursuit"	February 26, 2025	0.36
47	6	"A Star–Holder is Born"	March 5, 2025	0.30
48	7	"Old Friends, New Rivals"	March 12, 2025	0.30
49	8	"You D–Rival Me Crazy"	March 19, 2025	0.27
50	9	"Star–Crossed Rivals"	March 26, 2025	0.30
51	10	"This is Why We're Rivals"	April 2, 2025	0.23
52	11	"A Race for the Stars"	April 9, 2025	0.25
53	12	"An Un–Rivaled Twist"	April 16, 2025	0.28
