= CT Tamburello =

American television personality

Chris "CT" Tamburello
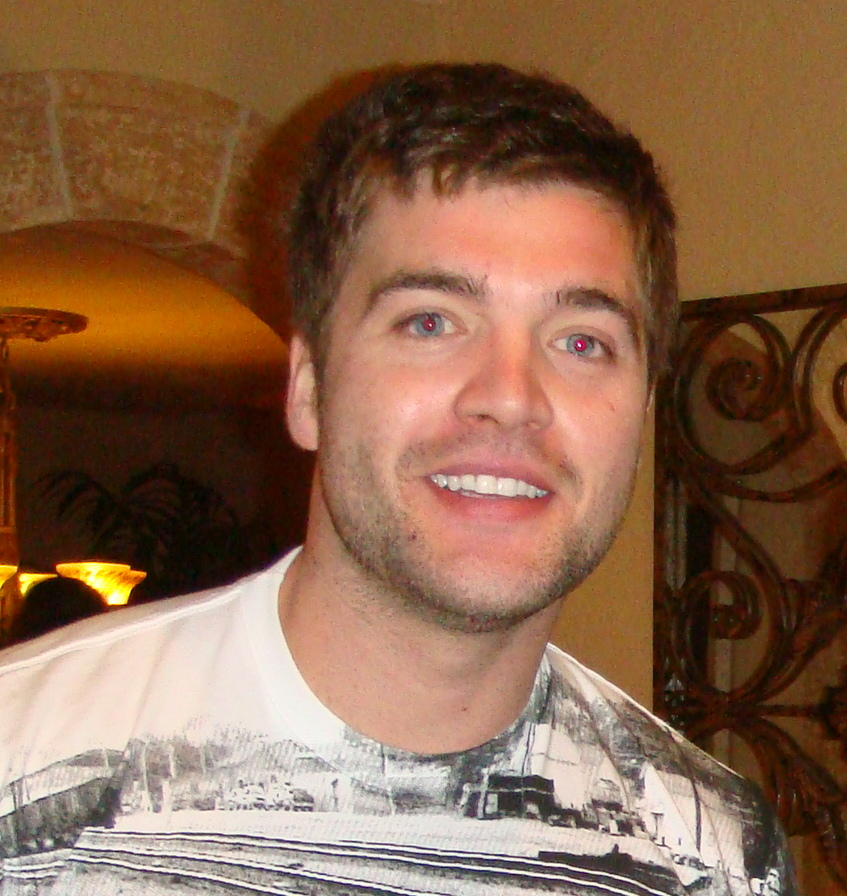
- Tamburello in 2008
- Born: Christopher Michael Tamburello; July 16, 1980 (age 46); Boston, Massachusetts, U.S.
- Occupation: Reality television personality
- Television: The Challenge; The Real World: Paris; The Traitors
- Spouses: Lilianet Solares (m. 2018; div. 2023) Catalina White (m. 2024; sep. 2026)
- Children: 1

Christopher Michael "CT" Tamburello (born on July 16, 1980) is an American television personality and actor, best known as a competitor on the MTV reality competition show The Challenge. His first television appearance was on the thirteenth season of The Real World in 2003. In 2023, he competed on the second season of The Traitors.

== Television appearances ==
In 2003, Tamburello was offered the choice to appear on The Real World: Paris or Road Rules, opting to choose the former.

Tamburello made his Challenge debut on its eighth season. He would win his first season in 2013, where he was partnered with rival Wes Bergmann on The Challenge: Rivals II. As of 2026, Tamburello has won six seasons of The Challenge and two spin-off seasons.

Tamburello competed on the second season of The Traitors alongside fellow The Challenge alumni Trishelle Cannatella and Johnny Bananas. Tamburello competed the whole season as a "faithful" and was able to help banish the four traitors of the season (Dan Gheesling, Parvati Shallow, Phaedra Parks and Kate Chastain). In the end, he and Cannatella were the last two standing and were the winners of the season.

== Personal life ==
Tamburello was in an on-again, off-again relationship with fellow The Challenge competitor Diem Brown from 2006 until 2007. Tamburello then started a relationship with Lilianet Solares, in which they had a child born in 2016; the pair were married in 2018. They divorced in 2023. Tamburello married OnlyFans personality Catalina White in October 2024; White officially filed for divorce in January 2026, quoting irreconcilable differences. Later that year, Tamburello was reported to be dating Phaedra Parks from The Real Housewives of Atlanta and his co-star on The Traitors.

== Filmography ==
=== Film ===
Year	Title	Role	Notes
2019	Habitual	Brett Mitchell	
2022	The Most Dangerous Game	Sanger Rainsford	
2023	Hunting Games	Will Walker	

=== Television ===
Year	Title	Role	Notes
2003	The Real World: Paris	Himself	24 episodes
2004	Real World/Road Rules Challenge: The Inferno	Contestant	Runner-up (19 episodes, including reunion special)
2005	Real World/Road Rules Challenge: The Inferno II	Contestant	Runner-up (17 episodes, including reunion special)
2006	Real World/Road Rules Challenge: The Duel	Contestant	Eliminated (16 episodes, including reunion special)
2007	Real World/Road Rules Challenge: The Inferno 3	Contestant	Disqualified (1 episode)
2008	Real World/Road Rules Challenge: The Gauntlet III	Contestant	Runner-up (9 episodes)
2009	Real World/Road Rules Challenge: The Duel II	Contestant	Disqualified (1 episode)
2010	The Challenge: Cutthroat	Himself	Guest (1 episode)
2011	The Challenge: Rivals	Contestant	Eliminated (10 episodes, including reunion special)
2012	The Challenge: Battle of the Exes	Contestant	Runner-up (11 episodes, including reunion special)
2013	The Challenge: Rivals II	Contestant	Winner (13 episodes, including reunion special)
2014	The Challenge: Free Agents	Contestant	Eliminated (11 episodes, including reunion special)
2015	The Challenge: Battle of the Exes II	Contestant	Disqualified (3 episodes)
2015	The Challenge: Battle of the Bloodlines	Himself	Guest (2 episodes)
2017	The Challenge: Invasion of the Champions	Contestant	Winner (11 episodes, including reunion special)
2017	The Challenge: Champs vs. Pros	Contestant	Eliminated (6 episodes)
2017	The Challenge XXX: Dirty 30	Contestant	Third place (17 episodes, including reunion special)
2017	The Challenge: Champs vs. Stars	Contestant	Winner (8 episodes, including reunion special)
2018	The Challenge: Champs vs. Stars 2	Contestant	Winner (11 episodes, including reunion special)
2018	The Challenge: Final Reckoning	Contestant	Eliminated (10 episodes)
2018	Fear Factor	Contestant	Runner-up
2018	The Challenge: CT's Getting Married	Himself	
2019	The Challenge: War of the Worlds	Contestant	Eliminated (4 episodes)
2019	The Challenge: War of the Worlds 2	Contestant	Winner (16 episodes, including reunion special)
2020	The Challenge: Total Madness	Contestant	Eliminated (3 episodes)
2021	The Challenge: Double Agents	Contestant	Winner (19 episodes, including reunion special)
2021	The Challenge: Untold History	Himself	
2021	The Challenge: Spies, Lies & Allies	Contestant	Winner (19 episodes, including reunion special)
2024	The Challenge: Battle for a New Champion	Himself	Guest (1 episode)
2024	The Traitors 2	Contestant - Faithful	Co-winner with Trishelle Cannatella (12 episodes, including reunion special)
2024	The Challenge 40: Battle of the Eras	Contestant	Eliminated (5 episodes)
2025	The Challenge: Vets & New Threats	Contestant	Eliminated (10 episodes)
2026	Worst Cooks in America: Reality Check	Contestant	Eliminated (7 episodes)
2026	The Challenge: Cutthroat	Contestant	Winner
