= Tori Hall =

American beauty pageant contestant and TV personality

- Born: Victoria Marie Hall; Greenville, North Carolina, U.S.
- Other names: Tori Fiorenza; Tori Hall-Fiorenza; Tori Gwinn
- Height: 5 ft 8 in (1.73 m)
- Children: 4
- Beauty pageant titleholder
- Title: Miss Virginia Teen USA 2005; Miss Virginia USA 2008
- Hair color: Brown
- Eye color: Brown
- Major competitions: Miss Virginia Teen USA 2005 (Winner); Miss Teen USA 2005 (Top 10); Miss Virginia USA 2008 (Winner); Miss USA 2008

Victoria Marie Hall (born December 20, 1986) is an American beauty queen and reality television personality from Midlothian, Virginia who competed in Miss Teen USA 2005, placing in the Top 10, and Miss USA 2008. She is also known for being part of the cast of the Viewers' Revenge season of the MTV series Road Rules, and on numerous seasons of The Challenge.

== Early life ==
Hall's father is a preacher and she moved numerous times as a child, living in Waddy, Kentucky before moving to Midlothian, Virginia with her father when her parents' marriage ended. After graduating from Clover Hill high school in Midlothian, she studied at Virginia Intermont College. Hall attended the University of Kentucky. At the end of 2005, Hall was involved in a car crash and though not seriously injured, it led to her embracing religion.

== Pageants ==
Hall won the Miss Virginia Teen USA 2005 title on October 30, 2004, after competing in the pageant for the first time. Her sister titleholder was Jennifer Pitts, Miss Virginia USA 2005.

Hall represented Virginia in the 2006 Miss Teen USA pageant held in Baton Rouge, Louisiana on August 8, 2005. She initially made the semi-finals in the nationally televised pageant, and competed in the evening gown competition. She then advanced to the top ten, and competed in swimsuit. Hall's top ten placement was Virginia's first placement since Kristi Lauren Glakas made the top ten in 1999.

Hall passed on her crown to Samantha Casey of Jeffersontown on November 12, 2005. Casey had been her first runner-up in the 2005 state pageant.

In 2007, Hall won the Miss Virginia USA 2008 title, the third consecutive Miss Virginia Teen USA to do so, and represented Virginia in the 2008 Miss USA pageant.

== Reality television ==
=== Road Rules ===
In 2007, Hall participated in the MTV reality television series Road Rules 2007: Viewers' Revenge as part of the "pit crew", which competed for a part on the show. At the end of the first episode, Hall became the first member of the pit crew to join the Road Rulers crew in the "RV" when she won a challenge against Veronica Portillo. Hall remained with the RV crew until the end of the show, which lasted 15 episodes. For making it to the final mission, Tori and the other five members received the handsome reward which included money the crew had won doing different challenges during the show, as well as a Mazda3.

=== Real World/Road Rules Challenge ===
After her appearance on Road Rules, Hall competed in 2008's Real World/Road Rules Challenge: The Gauntlet 3, on MTV. She was part of the six remaining castmembers on the Rookies team which competed in and won the final mission worth $300,000. On this season of The Challenge, Tori met her future husband Brad Fiorenza, who was a competitor on the opposing team.

In 2009, Hall competed on the Real World/Road Rules Challenge: The Duel 2 alongside her then-boyfriend Brad Fiorenza. They reported on the reunion special that they were still engaged. The two married on April 12, 2010.

Hall appeared again as a contestant on The Challenge: Cutthroat with husband Brad. They both were part of the winning team in the final mission and won $40,000 each.

In 2019, Hall appeared on a special mini Challenge at Universal Orlando alongside other champions. She was paired with Alton Williams from The Real World: Las Vegas and competed against Veronica Portillo, Darrell Taylor, Derrick Kosinksi and Emily Schromm. The special aired on May 22, 2019, during the season finale of The Challenge: War of the Worlds and it was hosted by Devyn Simone from The Real World: Brooklyn.

== Personal life ==
After their marriage, Hall and Fiorenza welcomed two sons, born in August 2011 and January 2015. In late 2015, the couple separated, and in December 2016 they officially divorced. On October 23, 2020, Hall married lawyer Dusty Gwinn. Hall's third child, a boy, was born in September 2021. Hall's fourth child, a girl, was born November 2022.

Awards and achievements
| Preceded by Lauren Barnette | Miss Virginia USA; 2008 | Succeeded by Maegan Phillips |
| Preceded by Mally Gent | Miss Virginia Teen USA; 2005 | Succeeded by Samantha Casey |
