= The Challenge: Cutthroat (2010 season) =

20th season of the reality television series

Cutthroat
- Season 20
- Presented by: T. J. Lavin
- No. of contestants: 30
- Winners: Brad Fiorenza; Dunbar Merrill; Tori Fiorenza; Tyler Duckworth
- Location: Prague, Czech Republic
- No. of episodes: 12 (Special & Reunion Included)

Release
- Original network: MTV
- Original release: October 6 – December 22, 2010

Season chronology
- ← Previous; Fresh Meat II Next → Rivals

The Challenge: Cutthroat is the 20th season of the MTV reality competition series, The Challenge. Filmed in Prague, Czech Republic, Cutthroat featured a three-teams format with cast members from The Real World, Road Rules and The Challenge. The season premiered on Wednesday, October 6, 2010, and concluded with the "S#!% They Should Have Shown" special on December 22, 2010.

== Format ==
This season of The Challenge features a new format, consisting of three teams. A race to the "Gulag" was held to determine the selections of the teams. The three players that finished last in the race — Camila Nakagawa, Shauvon Torres and Emilee Fitzpatrick — were chosen as the team captains. Those three selected players, alternating between male and female, until each team was split evenly — five men and five women on each team — see Cast and Draft sections below.

The three teams will participate in numerous challenges (sometimes called "missions"), which are followed by an elimination challenge, known as the "Gulag." The team who wins a challenge will receive a cash prize of $20,000 to be banked in their team bank accounts, as well as winning immunity from the Gulag.

The two losing teams will then be forced to choose one player of each gender from their own teams for possible elimination. Each player will cast secret votes to decide which two men and two women will battle in same-gender Gulags. The winning players will rejoin their respective teams and stay in the game for a chance at a share of $120,000, while the losing players will be eliminated from the game.

Cast members who had been eliminated were removed from the opening credits, leaving only current members of the three teams left. It is the first (and so far only) time in challenge history that this has occurred.

In the event a vote is tied, a run-off vote is conducted. If the run-off does not resolve the tie, the player going into the Gulag from the opposing team selects any (same-sex) member of the other team to send to the Gulag.

== Contestants ==
Male contestants	Original season	Finish
Brad Fiorenza	The Real World: San Diego	Winner
Dunbar Merrill	The Real World: Sydney	Winner
Tyler Duckworth	The Real World: Key West	Winner
Abram Boise	Road Rules: South Pacific	Runner-up (Note: Abram and Sarah were removed from the "Czech Point" final mission, after they both fell severely ill midway through the final race. They both earned a share of the $100,000 that the Grey team earned in the team challenges that they won, with each Grey team player earning $20,000.)
Luke Wolfe	The Challenge: Fresh Meat II	Runner-up
Derrick Kosinski	Road Rules: X-Treme	Episode 10
Johnny Devenanzio	The Real World: Key West	Episode 9
Dan Walsh	Road Rules 2007: Viewers' Revenge	Episode 7
Brandon Nelson	The Challenge: Fresh Meat II	Episode 6
Chet Cannon	The Real World: Brooklyn	Episode 6 (Note: Chet was rushed to the hospital after he suffered a concussion at the "Surf's Up" challenge in Episode 5. Prior to the "Sky Hook" challenge in Episode 6, it was announced that Chet was medically prohibited from competing.)
Ty Ruff	The Real World: D.C.	Episode 5 (Note: Brandon won the "Pole Me Over" Gulag by default, after an exhausted Ty failed to get up midway through the Gulag.)
Eric Banks	Real World/Road Rules Challenge: Fresh Meat	Episode 4
Vinny Foti	The Challenge: Fresh Meat II	Episode 3
JD Ordoñez	The Real World: Brooklyn	Episode 2
Derek Chavez	The Real World: Cancun	Episode 1

Female contestants	Original season	Finish
Tori Fiorenza	Road Rules 2007: Viewers' Revenge	Winner
Cara Maria Sorbello	The Challenge: Fresh Meat II	Runner-up
Laurel Stucky	The Challenge: Fresh Meat II	Runner-up
Sarah Rice	The Real World: Brooklyn	Runner-up
Emily Schromm	The Real World: D.C.	Third place
Jenn Grijalva	The Real World: Denver	Third place
Paula Meronek	The Real World: Key West	Episode 10
Theresa Gonzalez	The Challenge: Fresh Meat II	Episode 9
Camila Nakagawa	Spring Break Challenge	Episode 7
Melinda Stolp	The Real World: Austin	Episode 6
Katie Doyle	Road Rules: The Quest	Episode 5
Ayiiia Elizarraras	The Real World: Cancun	Episode 4
Shauvon Torres	The Real World: Sydney	Episode 3 (Note: Katie and Shauvon were set to compete in the "Die Hard" Gulag in Episode 3. However, Shauvon quit the game and no female Gulag was held.)
Mandi Moyer	The Challenge: Fresh Meat II	Episode 2
Emilee Fitzpatrick	The Real World: Cancun	Episode 1

=== Draft ===
Round	Red Team	Grey Team	Blue Team
Captain	Camila	Shauvon	Emilee
1	Dunbar	Vinny	Johnny
2	Tori	Laurel	Jenn
3	Brad	Abram	Derrick
4	Paula	Sarah	Emily
5	Tyler	Dan	Ty
6	Melinda	Ayiiia	Theresa
7	Chet	Luke	Derek
8	Mandi	Cara Maria	Katie
9	Brandon	JD	Eric

=== Heavy hitters ===
Heavy hitters	Original season
Chris "CT" Tamburello	The Real World: Paris
Tina Barta	Road Rules: South Pacific

== Gameplay ==
=== Challenge games ===
- Gas Problems: Teams have to assemble a five-layered puzzle, and each puzzle has different diagrams that are locked in five separate boxes. In order to unlock the boxes, players have to enter a gas chamber in pairs, and memorize combinations of codes and letters that will unlock the boxes containing the diagrams. The first team to correctly assemble their puzzle together wins. (Note: Ayiiia was prohibited from entering the gas chamber due to a medical condition, though she could still help out with assembling the puzzle. Laurel entered the gas chamber twice to suffice.)
  - Winner: Grey Team
- Brain Buster: Players from each team are suspended upside down from ropes in front of the Průmyslový palác in Prague, and have to transfer color-coded beer steins from one end of a course to another by swinging toward their team members, and having their teammates place the steins on color-coded pedestals. The team that transfers the most beer steins within a 15-minute time limit wins. (Note: Since there were eight ropes present and ten players from the Red and Grey teams, those teams had to sit out two players each.)
  - Winner: Blue Team
- Bed Head: A series of five beds is suspended from a platform 40 feet above the water, and players from each team have to jump one-by-one from bed to bed, with each bed decreasing in size from start to finish. Once an entire team has landed on the same bed, the process continues until each team member has landed on the last bed at the end of the platform. Players are disqualified if they fall into the water, or if one player is touching their bed with their hands when a teammate jumps to join that player on the bed. The team that makes it to the last bed with the fewest disqualifications and in the fastest time wins.
  - Winner: Red Team
- Bottleneck Stampede: Players from each team have to push their way simultaneously through a giant obstacle course, with each obstacle creating its own "bottleneck." The first team to get all their players across a finish line wins.
  - Winner: Red Team
- Surf's Up: Teams jump onto a platform that is hanging from a side of a cliff, 40 feet above water. Teams jump onto a "flying surfboard" in pairs, and players have to "surf" as far as possible before falling into water, then swim around two buoys, and ring a bell once they reach the other side of the lagoon. The team with the fastest average time wins.
  - Winner: Grey Team
- Sky Hook: Players from each team have to climb onto a series of metal rings that are hanging from a platform suspended high above water. Players have to pass basketballs from one teammate to another until the player closest to the basket can shoot basketballs into a basket that is also hanging from a platform. Each player has to be on a ring before any balls can be transferred from player to player. A team loses one ball for each player that falls into water. Each team has 10 basketballs and a 20-minute time limit to shoot as many balls into a basket as possible. The team that makes the most baskets in the fastest time wins.
  - Winner: Grey Team
- Gimme a Hand: Teams have to walk on a tightrope suspended high above ground, from one nine-story building to another at Prosek Point in Prague. Players try to advance on the tightropes in pairs, with their hips and ankles attached to their partner, and have to use overhead ropes to guide them on the tightropes. The team with the most players advancing from building to building in the fastest time wins.
  - Winner: Blue Team
- High Ball: Teams have to transfer and balance balls uphill in pairs, on a ball carrier that resembles an oversize martini glass with a flat lid. Two players have to hold the ball carrier while one player loads a ball to the top of the ball carrier, and each pair of players has to deposit balls into a high basket at the top of the hill, using the ball carrier. The team that transfers the most balls into their basket within a 90-minute time limit wins.
  - Winner: Grey Team
- Riot Act: Players have to knock players from opposing teams off a square dirt platform and into a mud pit, using glass riot shields. The challenge is played in two rounds: guys vs. guys and girls vs. girls. A team is still in the game as long as one teammate is still in the platform. If there are two different winners after each gender has been knocked out of the platform in each round, one player from each winning team will face off in a head-to-head match, in which the last player standing wins the challenge for their team and well as an automatic bid to the final challenge.
  - Winner: Grey Team

=== Gulag games ===
- Handcuffs: Players have to wrestle rings out of their opponent's hands. The first player to wrestle rings out of their opponent's hands five times wins.
  - Played by: Brandon vs. Derek, Camila vs. Emilee, Brandon vs. Derrick and Emily vs. Melinda
- Back Up Off Me: Players are tied to each other, back-to-back, and have to drag their opponent to knock over their own barrel. The first player to knock over their own barrel twice wins.
  - In Episode 9, a variation of the Back Up Off Me challenge was played where both Gulag Nominees played against a "Heavy Hitter". The winner would be the player that wins the fastest time or alternatively, lasts longer before their Heavy Hitter wins. (Note: Instead of facing each other, the contestants selected for the Gulag faced the Heavy Hitters. Johnny and Tyler faced Chris "CT" Tamburello, while Theresa and Tori faced Tina Barta.)
  - Played by: Brandon vs. JD, Cara Maria vs. Mandi, Johnny vs. Tyler (Heavy Hitter: CT) and Theresa vs. Tori (Heavy Hitter: Tina)
- Die Hard: Players have to stand, kneel on and roll oversize dice, without any body parts touching the ground. The players have to match the number that is rolled prior to the Gulag. The first player to roll their die into a designated square with the matching number facing up wins.
  - Played by: Eric vs. Vinny, Dan vs. Dunbar and Camila vs. Laurel
- Swat: Players are chained by their necks at a table, and have to slap each other in the face with fly swatters (while wearing protective goggles). After multiple rounds of "swatting", players have to hold up a bucket filled with dirt with one arm, while continuing to slap their opponent in the face with fly swatters. The opponent wins if a player drops their bucket to the ground.
  - Played by: Katie vs. Ayiiia and Luke vs. Eric
- Pole Me Over: Players have to grab a pole, and push their opponent backwards toward their own barrels. The first player to knock over their opponent's barrels twice wins.
  - Played by: Brandon vs. Ty, Camila vs. Katie, Derrick vs. Tyler and Emily vs. Paula

=== Czech Point final challenge ===
The final challenge begins with each team sprinting to the first checkpoint, "Seeing Spots," in which each team has to designate one player to stand in front of a wall containing five white targets, and one teammate has to hit each target with a paint ball gun before advancing. The next checkpoint is "So Tired," in which teams have to roll oversize tires on the tarmac. The next checkpoint is "Down & Dirty," in which players have to slide through an obstacle course containing a dirt pit. At the "Free Ride" checkpoint, one player from each team has to lie on a stretcher while their teammate carries them to the next check point. (Note: Since the Blue Team only had two members — Emily & Jenn, they instead carried a mannequin on the stretcher.) At the "Hard Wood" checkpoint, each team must transfer a pile of wood to the top of a hangar in a designated area before advancing to the "Sign Language" checkpoint, in which each team has to memorize the placement of a sign post containing Czech road signs, then crawl through an obstacle course through mud and under barb wire, then swim through a lake. After swimming through a lake, each team has to slide a series of Czech road signs through a pole to duplicate the sign post from the earlier "Sign Language" checkpoint. If a team slides in each sign correctly, they can advance, otherwise, they have to return to the original "Sign Language" checkpoint. The final stretch involves a sprint to the top of Bezděz Castle.

- Winner: Red Team

== Game summary ==
Episode		Winners	Gulag nominees			Gulag game	Gulag outcome	
#	Challenge	Winners	Red	Grey	Blue	Gulag game	Winner	Eliminated
1	Gas Problems	Grey Team	Brandon	—N/a	Derek	Handcuffs	Brandon	Derek
1	Gas Problems	Grey Team	Camila	—N/a	Emilee	Handcuffs	Camila	Emilee
2	Brain Buster	Blue Team	Brandon	JD	—N/a	Back Up Off Me	Brandon	JD
2	Brain Buster	Blue Team	Mandi	Cara Maria	—N/a	Back Up Off Me	Cara Maria	Mandi
3	Bed Head	Red Team	—N/a	Vinny	Eric	Die Hard	Eric	Vinny
3	Bed Head	Red Team	—N/a	Shauvon	Katie	Die Hard	—N/a	
4	Bottleneck Stampede	Red Team	—N/a	Ayiiia	Katie	Swat	Katie	Ayiiia
4	Bottleneck Stampede	Red Team	—N/a	Luke	Eric	Swat	Luke	Eric
5	Surf's Up	Grey Team	Brandon	—N/a	Ty	Pole Me Over	Brandon	Ty
5	Surf's Up	Grey Team	Camila	—N/a	Katie	Pole Me Over	Camila	Katie
6	Sky Hook	Grey Team	Melinda	—N/a	Emily	Handcuffs	Emily	Melinda
6	Sky Hook	Grey Team	Brandon	—N/a	Derrick	Handcuffs	Derrick	Brandon
7	Gimme a Hand	Blue Team	Dunbar	Dan	—N/a	Die Hard	Dunbar	Dan
7	Gimme a Hand	Blue Team	Camila	Laurel	—N/a	Die Hard	Laurel	Camila
8/9	High Ball	Grey Team	Tori	—N/a	Theresa	Back Up Off Me	Tori	Theresa
8/9	High Ball	Grey Team	Tyler	—N/a	Johnny	Back Up Off Me	Tyler	Johnny
9/10	Riot Act	Grey Team	Tyler	—N/a	Derrick	Pole Me Over	Tyler	Derrick
9/10	Riot Act	Grey Team	Paula	—N/a	Emily	Pole Me Over	Emily	Paula (Note: Paula was disqualified for repeatedly grabbing the boundary chains in the "Pole Me Over" Gulag. Therefore, Emily was declared the winner by default.)
10	Czech Points	Red Team	2nd place: Grey Team; 3rd place: Blue Team					

=== Elimination progress ===
Contestants	Challenges									
Contestants	1	2	3	4	5	6	7	8/9	9/10	Finale
Brad	SAFE	SAFE	WIN	WIN	SAFE	SAFE	SAFE	SAFE	SAFE	WINNER
Dunbar	SAFE	SAFE	WIN	WIN	SAFE	SAFE	ELIM	SAFE	SAFE	WINNER
Tori	SAFE	SAFE	WIN	WIN	SAFE	SAFE	SAFE	ELIM	SAFE	WINNER
Tyler	SAFE	SAFE	WIN	WIN	SAFE	SAFE	SAFE	ELIM	ELIM	WINNER
Cara Maria	WIN	ELIM	SAFE	SAFE	WIN	WIN	SAFE	WIN	WIN	SECOND
Laurel	WIN	SAFE	SAFE	SAFE	WIN	WIN	ELIM	WIN	WIN	SECOND
Luke	WIN	SAFE	SAFE	ELIM	WIN	WIN	SAFE	WIN	WIN	SECOND
Abram	WIN	SAFE	SAFE	SAFE	WIN	WIN	SAFE	WIN	WIN	SECOND
Sarah	WIN	SAFE	SAFE	SAFE	WIN	WIN	SAFE	WIN	WIN	SECOND
Emily	SAFE	WIN	SAFE	SAFE	SAFE	ELIM	WIN	SAFE	ELIM	THIRD
Jenn	SAFE	WIN	SAFE	SAFE	SAFE	SAFE	WIN	SAFE	SAFE	THIRD
Paula	SAFE	SAFE	WIN	WIN	SAFE	SAFE	SAFE	SAFE	DQ	
Derrick K.	SAFE	WIN	SAFE	SAFE	SAFE	ELIM	WIN	SAFE	OUT	
Johnny	SAFE	WIN	SAFE	SAFE	SAFE	SAFE	WIN	OUT		
Theresa	SAFE	WIN	SAFE	SAFE	SAFE	SAFE	WIN	OUT		
Camila	ELIM	SAFE	WIN	WIN	ELIM	SAFE	OUT			
Dan	WIN	SAFE	SAFE	SAFE	WIN	WIN	OUT			
Brandon	ELIM	ELIM	WIN	WIN	ELIM	OUT				
Melinda	SAFE	SAFE	WIN	WIN	SAFE	OUT				
Chet	SAFE	SAFE	WIN	WIN	SAFE	MED				
Katie	SAFE	WIN	SAVE	ELIM	OUT					
Ty	SAFE	WIN	SAFE	SAFE	DQ					
Eric	SAFE	WIN	ELIM	OUT						
Ayiiia	WIN	SAFE	SAFE	OUT						
Shauvon	WIN	SAFE	QUIT							
Vinny	WIN	SAFE	OUT							
Mandi	SAFE	OUT								
JD	WIN	OUT								
Emilee	OUT									
Derek C.	OUT									

Teams
The contestant is on the Red team
The contestant is on the Blue team
The contestant is on the Grey team
Competition
The contestant's team won the competition
The contestant's team did not win the final challenge
The contestant's team won the challenge and was safe from the Gulag
The contestant's team lost the challenge, but the contestant was not chosen for the Gulag
The contestant was chosen for the Gulag, but did not have to compete
The contestant won the Gulag
The contestant lost the Gulag and was eliminated
The contestant was disqualified in the Gulag and was eliminated
The contestant withdrew from the competition prior to the Gulag
The contestant was removed from the competition due to medical reasons

=== Voting progress ===
Voted Into the Gulag	Brandon; 8 of 10 votes	JD; 6 of 10 votes	Eric; 5 of 8 votes	Luke; 7 of 7 votes		Ty; 7 of 7 votes	Derrick; 5 of 5 votes	Dunbar; 3 of 6 votes	Tyler; 5 of 5 votes	Tyler; 3 of 5 votes
Voted Into the Gulag	Camila; 9 of 10 votes	Cara Maria; 7 of 10 votes	Katie; 5 of 8 votes	Ayiiia; 4 of 7 votes		Katie; 7 of 7 votes	Emily; 5 of 5 votes	Camila; 5 of 6 votes	Tori; 5 of 5 votes	Paula; 4 of 5 votes
Voted Into the Gulag	Derek; 8 of 10 votes	Brandon; 8 of 10 votes	Vinny; 6 of 9 votes	Tie Vote	Eric; 6 of 8 votes	Brandon; 8 of 8 votes	Brandon; 6 of 8 votes	Dan; 6 of 6 votes	Johnny; 5 of 5 votes	Derrick; By Default
Voted Into the Gulag	Emilee; 9 of 10 votes	Mandi; 8 of 10 votes	Shauvon; 9 of 9 votes	Katie; 8 of 8 votes		Camila; 7 of 8 votes	Melinda; 6 of 8 votes	Laurel; 4 of 6 votes	Theresa; 5 of 5 votes	Emily; 3 of 3 votes
Voter	Episodes									
Voter	1	2	3	4		5	6	7	8/9	9/10
Brad	Brandon	Brandon				Brandon	Brandon	Tyler	Tyler	Tyler
Brad	Camila	Mandi				Camila	Melinda	Camila	Tori	Paula
Dunbar	Brandon	Brandon				Brandon	Brandon	Tyler	Tyler	Tyler
Dunbar	Camila	Mandi				Camila	Melinda	Camila	Tori	Paula
Tori	Brandon	Brandon				Brandon	Brandon	Dunbar	Tyler	Tyler
Tori	Camila	Mandi				Camila	Melinda	Camila	Tori	Paula
Tyler	Brandon	Brandon				Brandon	Brandon	Dunbar	Tyler	Brad
Tyler	Camila	Mandi				Camila	Melinda	Camila	Tori	Paula
Abram		Abram	Luke	Luke				Dan		
Abram		Shauvon	Shauvon	Sarah				Laurel		
Cara Maria		Luke	Vinny	Luke				Dan		
Cara Maria		Shauvon	Shauvon	Ayiiia				Laurel		
Laurel		JD	Vinny	Luke				Dan		
Laurel		Cara Maria	Shauvon	Cara Maria				Cara Maria		
Luke		JD	Vinny	Luke				Dan		
Luke		Cara Maria	Shauvon	Ayiiia				Laurel		
Sarah		JD	Vinny	Luke				Dan		
Sarah		Cara Maria	Shauvon	Ayiiia				Cara Maria		
Emily	Derek		Eric	Eric	Eric	Ty	Derrick		Johnny	Derrick
Emily	Emilee		Katie	Katie		Katie	Emily		Theresa	Emily
Jenn	Derek		Eric	Ty	Eric	Ty	Derrick		Johnny	Derrick
Jenn	Emilee		Katie	Katie		Katie	Emily		Theresa	Emily
Paula	Brandon	Brandon				Brandon	Brandon	Dunbar	Tyler	Dunbar
Paula	Camila	Mandi				Camila	Melinda	Camila	Tori	Tori
Derrick	Derek		Ty	Ty	Eric	Ty	Derrick		Johnny	Derrick
Derrick	Emilee		Emily	Katie		Katie	Emily		Theresa	Emily
Johnny	Derek		Eric	Eric	Eric	Ty	Derrick		Johnny	
Johnny	Emilee		Katie	Katie		Katie	Emily		Theresa	
Theresa	Derek		Eric	Eric	Eric	Ty	Derrick		Johnny	
Theresa	Emilee		Katie	Katie		Katie	Emily		Theresa	
Camila	Brandon	Dunbar				Brandon	Brad	Brad		
Camila	Mandi	Mandi				Melinda	Melinda	Tori		
Dan		JD	Luke	Luke				Dan		
Dan		Cara Maria	Shauvon	Ayiiia				Laurel		
Brandon	Chet	Dunbar				Brandon	Dunbar			
Brandon	Camila	Camila				Camila	Paula			
Melinda	Dunbar	Brandon				Brandon	Brandon			
Melinda	Camila	Mandi				Camila	Camila			
Chet	Brandon	Brandon								
Chet	Camila	Mandi								
Katie	Derek		Ty	Ty	Ty	Ty				
Katie	Emilee		Theresa	Katie		Katie				
Ty	Derek		Eric	Eric	Eric	Ty				
Ty	Emilee		Katie	Katie		Katie				
Eric	Derek		Ty	Ty	Ty					
Eric	Emilee		Theresa	Katie						
Ayiiia		JD	Vinny	Luke						
Ayiiia		Cara Maria	Shauvon	Cara Maria						
Shauvon		Luke	Vinny							
Shauvon		Cara Maria	Shauvon							
Vinny		JD	Luke							
Vinny		Shauvon	Shauvon							
Mandi	Brandon	Brandon								
Mandi	Camila	Camila								
JD		Luke								
JD		Cara Maria								
Emilee	Ty									
Emilee	Katie									
Derek	Ty									
Derek	Emilee									

== Partners ==
Gas Problems (Episode 1)
Red Team	Grey Team	Blue Team
Dunbar & Camila	Abram & Cara Maria	Johnny & Emilee
Brad & Tori	Laurel & Luke	Derrick & Emily
Tyler & Paula	JD & Shauvon	Derek & Jenn
Chet & Mandi	Dan & Sarah	Ty & Katie
Brandon & Melinda	Vinny & Laurel	Eric & Theresa

Surf's Up (Episode 5)
Blue Team	Grey Team	Red Team
Derrick & Johnny	Abram & Luke	Chet & Tyler
Emily & Jenn	Laurel & Sarah	Camila & Tori
Katie & Theresa	Cara Maria & Dan	Melinda & Paula
Derrick & Ty		Brandon & Dunbar
		Brad & Tyler

Gimme a Hand (Episode 7)
Blue Team	Red Team	Grey Team
Johnny & Theresa	Tyler & Camila	Abram & Cara Maria
Emily & Jenn	Dunbar & Paula	Laurel & Sarah
Derrick & Johnny	Brad & Tori	Dan & Luke

== Episodes ==
In contrast to past seasons of The Challenge, the title sequence features only the players that are still in the game for that episode (in past seasons, every player that participated would be shown, even after elimination).

No. overall	No. in season	Title	Original release date	US viewers (millions)
251	1	"Czech Yourself Before You Wreck Yourself"	October 6, 2010	1.74
252	2	"Newbie Doobie Doo"	October 13, 2010	1.27
253	3	"Karma's a Bitch"	October 20, 2010	1.28
254	4	"Swat the Hell?"	October 27, 2010	1.44
255	5	"Couching Tyger, Hidden Danimal"	November 3, 2010	1.31
256	6	"Where The Red Team Blows"	November 10, 2010	1.47
257	7	"Hell Hath No Fury"	November 17, 2010	1.41
258	8	"Back With a Vengeance"	December 1, 2010	1.05
259	9	"Always a Bridesmaid..."	December 8, 2010	1.24
260	10	"Czechmate"	December 15, 2010	1.39

=== Reunion special ===
The Challenge: Cutthroat Reunion was aired after the season finale on December 15, 2010, and was hosted by Maria Menounos. The cast members who attended the reunion were: Brad, Dunbar, Tori, Tyler, Cara Maria, Laurel, Luke, Abram, Sarah, Emily, Jenn, Derrick, Paula, Johnny and Eric.

== Controversy ==
During the third episode of the season, which aired on October 20, 2010, contestant Laurel Stucky drunkenly directed a series of insults at fellow contestant Eric Banks, regarding Banks' body image. Stucky later issued an apology on MTV.com after the episode aired. At the Reunion special, Banks confronted Stucky for the lack of sincerity and for making the apology on MTV.com instead of apologizing to him in person, though Stucky claimed that Banks brushed her off following the incident.
