= Eric Nies =

American model and television personality (born 1971)

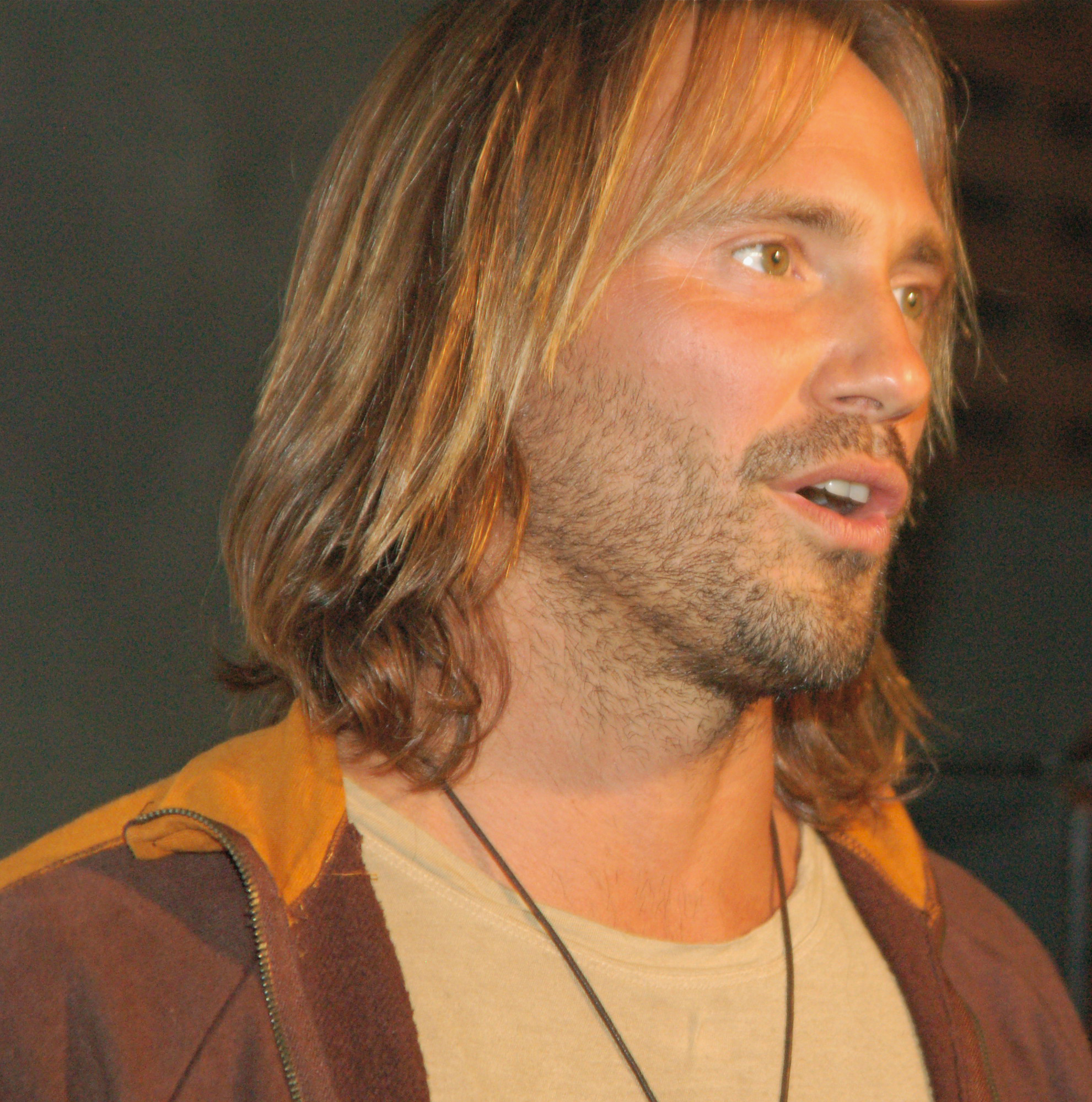
- Nies in October 2008
- Born: May 23, 1971 (age 55); Ocean Township, New Jersey

Eric Nies (born May 23, 1971) is an American former model and reality television personality. He first gained fame as a cast member on MTV's The Real World: New York, before going on to appear on that show's spinoffs and other reality shows, such as The Grind and Confessions of a Teen Idol. Nies revealed on the 2000 special The Real World 10th Anniversary Special that three years into hosting The Grind, a business manager stole a quarter million dollars from him, effectively leaving him destitute and ruining his career, after which he contemplated suicide. In November 2026 he was sued by his former friend Durek Verrett and his wife Princess Märtha Louise of Norway.

== Filmography ==
- The Real World: New York (1992)
- The Grind (1992) Host
- Hangin' w/MTV (1992) Host
- Days of Our Lives (1993) Disc Jockey
- Above the Rim (1994) Montrose
- The Brady Bunch Movie (1995) Hip MC
- The Real World Reunion (1995)
- The Real World Vacations: Behind the Scenes (1995)
- The Real World Reunion: Inside Out (1996)
- The Real World You Never Saw (1997)
- Real World/Road Rules Challenge: Road Rules: All-Stars (1998)
- The Real World You Never Saw: Boston + Seattle (1998)
- The Real World: Tenth Anniversary Special (2000) Host
- Real World/Road Rules Challenge: Battle of the Seasons (2002) Co-Host
- Dance Fever (2003)
- The Road to Reality (2003)
- Real World/Road Rules Challenge: Battle of the Sexes (2003)
- RopeSport: Extreme Workout (2003) Host
- RopeSport: Advanced Workout (2003) Host
- RopeSport: Intermediate Workout (2003) Host
- RopeSport: Basic Workout (2003) Host
- Real Hot (2004)
- I Love the '90s (2004)
- Real World/Road Rules Challenge: Battle of the Sexes 2 (2004)
- Celebrity Paranormal Project - Episode: Wooden Lucy (2006)
- The Real World Awards Bash (2008)
- Confessions of a Teen Idol (2009)
- The Real World Homecoming: New York (2021)
