= Mark Long =

American television personality (born 1971)

- Born: June 2, 1971 (age 55); Philadelphia, Pennsylvania, U.S.
- Education: University of Florida
- Years active: 1995–present
- Known for: The Challenge: All Stars
- Height: 1.91 m (6 ft 3 in)

Mark Long (born June 2, 1971) is an American reality television personality, actor, host, and professional wrestler, known for his appearances on MTV reality television series Road Rules: USA – The First Adventure, Challenge, The Challenge: All Stars and an appearance on Even Stevens.

== Early life and career ==
Long was born in Philadelphia, Pennsylvania in 1971 and is a 1994 graduate from the University of Florida, where he was a member of the Sigma Phi Epsilon fraternity. Long also revealed on the Reality Life With Kate Casey podcast that he was involved in making music in the late 1990's. In 1995, he appeared in his first reality TV show, Road Rules: USA – The First Adventure, where viewers initially saw Long try out as Puck's replacement on The Real World: San Francisco. In 2001, he also made a guest appearance on American Disney Channel original series Even Stevens. In 2021, Long became an executive producer of The Challenge: All Stars, while also starring as a contestant on the show. In late 2022, he appeared in WWE programming as an audience member in WWE NXT. Long now wrestles for Boca Raton Championship Wrestling.

== Personal life ==
Long was previously in a relationship with Robin Hibbard of The Real World.

Long is currently single, as he stated in an episode of The Mark Long Show in 2026.

== Filmography ==
=== Television ===
Year	Title	Role	Notes
1995	Road Rules: USA – The First Adventure	Contestant	
1996	Sweet Valley High	Band Member (4 Episodes)	
1998	The Real World/Road Rules Aqua Games	Host (with Kit Hoover)	
1999	Real World/Road Rules Challenge	Contestant	Winner
2001	Even Stevens	Actor (S2.E11 'Wild Child')	
2002	Real World/Road Rules Challenge: Battle of the Seasons	Host	
2003	Real World/Road Rules Challenge: Battle of the Sexes	Contestant	Winner
2004–2005	Real World/Road Rules Challenge: Battle of the Sexes 2	Contestant	Eliminated
2004–2005	Extreme Dodgeball	Contestant as part of Reef Sharks	Semifinalist
2005–2006	Real World/Road Rules Challenge: The Gauntlet 2	Contestant	Runner-up
2009	Real World/Road Rules Challenge: The Duel II	Contestant	Third place
2012	The Challenge: Battle of the Exes	Contestant	Eliminated
2021	The Challenge: All Stars season 1	Contestant	Fifth place
2022	The Challenge: All Stars season 3	Contestant	Fourth place
2022	Worst Cooks in America season 24	Contestant	Eliminated
2024	The Challenge 40: Battle of the Eras	Contestant	Eliminated

=== Film ===
Year	Title	Role	Notes
1997	Guarded Secrets	Pace Bradley	Thriller

== Awards ==
2009 Fox Reality Awards: Totally Robbed

== Championships and accomplishments ==
- Boca Raton Championship Wrestling
  - BRCW All-Star Championship (1 time, current)
