= The Challenge 40: Battle of the Eras =

40th season of the reality television series

Battle of the Eras
- Season 40
- Presented by: T. J. Lavin
- No. of contestants: 40
- Winners: Jenny West; Jordan Wiseley; Rachel Robinson
- Location: Ho Chi Minh City, Vietnam; Palawan, Philippines
- No. of episodes: 21 (including the two-part Reunion special)

Release
- Original network: MTV
- Original release: August 14, 2024 – January 22, 2025

Season chronology
- ← Previous; Battle for a New Champion Next → Vets & New Threats

The Challenge 40: Battle of the Eras is the 40th season of the MTV reality competition series The Challenge, featuring alumni from The Real World, Road Rules, The Challenge, Are You the One?, Big Brother, Survivor, Love Island (U.S. and UK), Survival of the Fittest, and Exatlon (U.S.) competing for a share at a $1 million prize. A launch special titled "Eras Only" aired on August 7, 2024, followed by the season premiere on August 14, 2024.

== Format ==
Battle of the Eras features 40 contestants split into four teams based on which season of The Challenge they debuted on. Those who debuted during the first ten seasons (Road Rules: All Stars through The Inferno II) comprised Era I; those who debuted between the eleventh and twentieth seasons (The Gauntlet 2 through Cutthroat) made up Era II; those who debuted between the twenty-first and thirtieth seasons (Rivals through XXX: Dirty 30) made up Era III; and those who debuted between the thirty-first and thirty-ninth seasons (Vendettas through Battle for a New Champion) made up Era IV.

Following the opening "Era Invitational" twist, the format of the game from episode 3–9 is as follows:

- Daily challenges: Players compete in a challenge as teams. Each team has a male and female target selected by the winners of the previous elimination round (known as "representatives" for episode 3, who were instead elected by their team). The winning team's targets are safe from elimination while the last-place team's targets are automatically sent to the elimination round.
- Nominations (The Chamber): The targets of the winning team must select a male and female target from one of the teams that did not win to compete against the last-place team's targets in the elimination round. If the winners do not agree, they are sent to the elimination round instead.
- Eliminations (The Arena): The targets of the last-place team individually compete in an elimination round against the targets selected by the winning team's targets. The winners of the elimination round continue in the competition and earn the power to choose the next targets, while the losers are eliminated.

From episode 10–17, the game modified to an individual format where eliminations alternate between male and female cycles, with the first cycle determined by a coin toss. In the daily challenge, the last-place player of the designated gender is automatically sent to the Arena while the last-place player of the non-designated gender receives a disadvantage for the following challenge. (Note: As the "Duned" challenge in episode 12 was also a Purge, the last-place male and female players were eliminated. The second-to-last male contestant was automatically sent to the Arena, while the second-to-last female contestant received a disadvantage for the next challenge.) The winning male and female player of the daily challenge are immune and receive the power to select one of the targets to compete in the elimination round against the last-place player of the daily challenge. If the winners do not agree, the decision of the winner of the gender not competing in the elimination takes precedence.

In episode 18/19, the final eight contestants compete in the Final Challenge to determine the champions of the season.

Twists

- Era Invitational: For the first challenge, contestants compete against members of their Era, as part of the "Era Invitational" twist which culminates in eight eliminations. The last-place male and female player from each Era are automatically sent to the elimination round. The winning male and female player are immune and earn the power to select two members of their own Era to compete against the last-place players in the elimination round.
- Karma Vote: In a twist unknown to contestants at the time, each eliminated contestant is given the chance to rate the remaining contestants from one (lowest) to five (highest). In the finale, it is revealed that the points cast for each finalist from the Karma Vote contribute to the scoring of the Final Challenge to determine the final placements.
- Targets: From episodes 3-9, the winners of elimination round earn the power to select one male and female player from each team as new targets for the next cycle. From episodes 10-16, the winner of the elimination round selects three targets of the opposite gender (with the challenge winners immune from selection) for the next cycle.
- Purge: In episode 12, the "Duned" challenge doubled as a Purge where the last-place male and female player were automatically eliminated from the competition. The regular penalties for last place were instead given to the second to last player of each gender.

== Contestants ==
Male contestants	Original season	Finish
Jordan Wiseley	The Real World: Portland	Winner
Derek Chavez	The Real World: Cancun	Runner-up
Johnny "Bananas" Devenanzio	The Real World: Key West	Third place
Kyland Young	Big Brother 23	Fourth place
Cory Wharton	Real World: Ex-Plosion	Episode 16
Josh Martinez	Big Brother 19	Episode 14
Theo Campbell	Love Island UK 3	Episode 12
Nehemiah Clark	The Real World: Austin	Episode 12
Ryan Kehoe	Real World/Road Rules Challenge: Fresh Meat	Episode 10
Devin Walker-Molaghan	Are You the One? 3	Episode 9
Derrick Kosinski	Road Rules: X-Treme	Episode 8
Darrell Taylor	Road Rules: Campus Crawl	Episode 7
Brad Fiorenza	The Real World: San Diego (2004)	Episode 6
Chris "CT" Tamburello	The Real World: Paris	Episode 5
Horacio Gutiérrez	Exatlón Estados Unidos 5	Episode 4
Tony Raines	Real World: Skeletons	Episode 3
Brandon Nelson	The Challenge: Fresh Meat II	Episode 2
Paulie Calafiore	Big Brother 18	Episode 2
Mark Long	Road Rules: USA – The First Adventure	Episode 2
Leroy Garrett	The Real World: Las Vegas (2011)	Episode 2

Female contestants	Original season	Finish
Jenny West	Survival of the Fittest	Winner (Note: Jenny and Rachel ended up tied in points in the Final Challenge, and both contestants were crowned champions. They split the first and second place prize for the female finalists, winning $237,500 each.)
Rachel Robinson	Road Rules: Campus Crawl	Winner
Michele Fitzgerald	Survivor: Kaôh Rōng	Third place
Tori Deal	Are You the One? 4	Fourth place
Cara Maria Sorbello	The Challenge: Fresh Meat II	Episode 17
Aviv Melmed	Real World/Road Rules Challenge: Fresh Meat	Episode 15
Olivia Kaiser	Love Island USA 3	Episode 13
Laurel Stucky	The Challenge: Fresh Meat II	Episode 12
Nia Moore	The Real World: Portland	Episode 11
Kaycee Clark	Big Brother 20	Episode 9
Averey Tressler	The Real World: Portland	Episode 8
Tina Barta	Road Rules: South Pacific	Episode 7
Jonna Mannion	The Real World: Cancun	Episode 6
Emily Schromm	The Real World: D.C.	Episode 5
Aneesa Ferreira	The Real World: Chicago	Episode 4
Jodi Weatherton	Road Rules: X-Treme	Episode 3
KellyAnne Judd	The Real World: Sydney	Episode 2
Nurys Mateo	Are You the One? 6	Episode 2
Katie Cooley	Road Rules: The Quest	Episode 2
Amanda Garcia	Are You the One? 3	Episode 2

=== Teams ===
Era I	Era II	Era III	Era IV
Aneesa (Note: Battle of the Sexes)	Aviv (Note: Fresh Meat)	Amanda (Note: Rivals III)	Horacio (Note: Ride or Dies)
Brad (Note: Battle of the Sexes 2)	Bananas (Note: The Duel)	Averey (Note: Battle of the Exes II)	Jenny (Note: War of the Worlds 2)
CT (Note: The Inferno)	Brandon (Note: Fresh Meat II)	Cory (Note: Battle of the Bloodlines)	Josh (Note: War of the Worlds)
Darrell (Note: The Gauntlet)	Cara Maria	Devin	Kaycee (Note: Total Madness)
Derrick K.	Derek C. (Note: Cutthroat)	Jonna (Note: Rivals)	Kyland (Note: Battle for a New Champion)
Jodi (Note: The Inferno II)	Emily	Jordan (Note: Rivals II)	Michele (Note: Spies, Lies & Allies)
Katie	KellyAnne (Note: The Island)	Leroy	Nurys
Mark (Note: Real World vs. Road Rules)	Laurel	Nia (Note: Free Agents)	Olivia
Rachel	Nehemiah	Tony	Paulie (Note: Final Reckoning)
Tina	Ryan	Tori (Note: XXX: Dirty 30)	Theo

Debut season

== Gameplay ==
=== Challenge games ===
- Light It Up: Players must assemble a three-dimensional puzzle, paddle a coracle to collect ten lights of their Era's color from buoys in a lake, then place them on their board onshore. The first male and female players from each Era to finish win, while the last-place male and female players from each Era are automatically sent to the elimination round.
  - Winners: CT and Rachel (Era I), Bananas and Laurel (Era II), Cory and Tori (Era III), Horacio and Michele (Era IV)
- Gladieater: Teams must paddle a dragon boat around an island. Once complete, each team member must consume one of eight delicacy dishes. Afterwards, teams must hang shields with logos of all 40 seasons of The Challenge to date in chronological order. The first team to finish wins while the last team to finish has their representatives automatically sent to the Arena.
  - Winners: Era III
- Cradled Cranium: Teams begin harnessed 30-feet above water. Each round, one member from each team selects an unrevealed trivia question from among various categories to answer, which also vary in points based on their difficulty. If they answer correctly, their team earns the points assigned to that question. However, if they answer incorrectly, two members of their team are dropped into the water and eliminated from the challenge. The team with the most points by the time all their team members are eliminated wins while the team with the fewest points have their targets automatically sent to the Arena. In the event of a tie, a sudden death round involving one member from each tied team is held.
  - Winners: Era II
- Fast Pass: Teams must carry and maneuver a large Y-shaped beam around various trees to reach eight sandbags, and return them to the start four at a time. Afterwards, two team members must distribute the sandbags on a balance beam so that the weight balances out. The first team to finish wins while the last team to finish has their targets automatically sent to the Arena.
  - Winners: Era IV
- Cloud Catcher: Three team members at a time race to collect large helium balloons attached to their team's poles and attempt to return them to their team's station intact. While returning the balloons, players must take them through a pergola covered in spikes. Once teams collect all their balloons, either intact or popped, they must solve a riddle and use the answer to unlock a chest to stop their time. The team with the most intact balloons collected wins, with ties broken based on time, while the team with the fewest intact balloons (or slowest time) has their targets automatically sent to the Arena.
  - Winners: Era IV
- Leap of Faith: Four team members are selected to be harnessed and jump off the helipad of the Bitexco Financial Tower to grab one of four hanging flags. After one team member jumps, the three other members must pull them back up before the next player can jump. Teams are imposed varying time penalties for dropping or missing a flag or collecting two flags at once. There is also a bonus flag which deducts three minutes from teams' overall time if collected. After all four flags are collected, the non-jumping team members must solve a puzzle to have their team's time stopped. For teams with only four members, one team member who jumped must also solve the puzzle on their team's behalf. The team with the fastest time wins while the team with the slowest time has their targets automatically sent to the Arena.
  - Winners: Era III
- Battle for Honor: Inspired by the film Gladiator II, the challenge is played in 20-minute male and female rounds. Players begin on a muddy platform and attempt to push their opponents into the surrounding water using a shield while avoiding being pushed off themselves. Players are eliminated from the challenge if they are pushed into the water or get held down for an extended time. The team with the most players still standing by the end of both rounds wins while the team with the fewest players has their targets automatically sent to the Arena.
  - Winners: Era IV
- Bottoms Out: Teams attempt to answer 27 math questions, with each equation only displayed briefly before the next one is shown. For each equation teams answer correctly, they receive one climbing hold for the next part of the challenge. Afterwards, teams enter a shipping container above water, where the walls are mounted with the climbing holds they earned. Once the bottom of the container opens, teams attempt to hold themselves up for as long as possible from the climbing holds. The team that holds on for the longest time wins while the team with the shortest time has their targets automatically sent to the Arena.
  - Winners: Era I
- Fire Away: A trebuchet launches balls into a field which players must collect and place in a tube at their station two at a time. After collecting enough balls to fill the tube, players must then solve a puzzle. The first male and female player to solve their puzzle wins while the last-place female player receives a disadvantage at the next challenge and the last-place male player is automatically sent to the Arena.
  - Winners: Jordan and Tori
- Building Bridges: Players climb up a tower then slide down a pole onto a wall with platforms on it (or the ground if they miss). They must ascend the wall, collect three coins along the way, and deposit the coins in a slot at the top. Afterwards, players must solve a puzzle, cross a bridge, then collect and deposit three coins from a second wall. Lastly, they must swing from a rope into a stack of boxes below. Players are disqualified from the challenge if they fall off the course. The male and female player with the fastest time wins while the male player with the slowest time receives a disadvantage at the next challenge and the female player with the slowest time is automatically sent to the Arena. If multiple players are disqualified, last-place is determined by distance progressed along the course. As a disadvantage for placing last in the previous challenge, Michele is imposed a 30-second time penalty.
  - Winners: Jenny and Kyland
- Duned: Players race to complete a three-checkpoint "mini-final" across a series of sand dunes. The first male and female player to finish wins while the last-place male and female player are eliminated from the competition. The second-last female player receives a disadvantage at the next challenge and the second-last male player is automatically sent to the Arena. As a disadvantage for placing last in the previous challenge, Theo is imposed a two-minute time penalty.
  - Checkpoint 1: Players must dig through sand to find a key, or time-out after 30 minutes, before proceeding to the next checkpoint.
  - Checkpoint 2: Players must use their key to unlock a stand-up paddleboard, paddle down a river, then proceed on foot to the next checkpoint.
  - Checkpoint 3: Players complete a memory game by flipping over coracles to reveal a previous season of The Challenge and match it to a letter on the coracle in the corresponding position on the other side of the area. Once complete, players proceed to the finish line.
  - Winners: Kyland and Tori
  - Eliminated: Laurel and Nehemiah
- 40 Yard Dash: Players race through various obstacles in a trench to collect six puzzle pieces and return them to their station one at a time, before using the pieces to assemble a puzzle. The first male and female player to solve the puzzle wins. The last-place male player receives a disadvantage at the next challenge while the last-place female player is automatically sent to the Arena. As a disadvantage for placing second-last in the previous challenge, Michele is imposed a one-minute time penalty.
  - Winners: Cara Maria and Jordan
- 'Nother Trucker: Two players at a time are harnessed on top of a truck. As the truck speeds down a road, they must swing from a rope and try to hit 12 roadside targets. The male and female player with the most targets hit wins. In the event of a tie for first, a sudden-death round is held. The female player with the fewest targets hit receives a disadvantage at the next challenge while the male player with the fewest targets hit is automatically sent to the Arena. As a disadvantage for placing last in the previous challenge, Cory is imposed a one-target penalty.
  - Winners: Derek C. and Rachel
- Tight Quarters: Players must navigate the Củ Chi tunnels to locate and solve a slide puzzle before collecting a bag of puzzle pieces. They must then take the pieces through a second tunnel before using them to solve another puzzle. There is a 30-minute time-limit before players time out, and players are disqualified from the challenge if they cross any barriers set in the tunnels. The male and female player with the fastest time wins. The male player with the slowest time receives a disadvantage at the next challenge while the female player with the slowest time is automatically sent to the Arena. As a disadvantage for placing last in the previous challenge, Aviv is imposed a two-minute time penalty.
  - Winners: Kyland and Tori
- Fire Plunge: One at a time, players are harnessed inside a convertible which they must "hot-wire" by connecting four cables to illuminate four lights. Once complete, the convertible drives off a cliff, leaving players harnessed above the water. Players must then unclip into the water and swim 500 metres (547 yd) to shore. The male and female player with the fastest time wins and receive a cash prize of $5,000 each. The female player with the slowest time receives a disadvantage at the next challenge while the male player with the slowest time is automatically sent to the Arena. As a disadvantage for placing last in the previous challenge, Bananas is imposed a 30-second time penalty.
  - Winners: Jordan and Tori
- Fortress Bricks: Players must carry 40 cinder blocks, two at a time, from their puzzle station within Fort Santa Isabel and deposit them outside. After depositing four cinder blocks, players can take one of ten planks to their puzzle station, repeating this process until they collect all ten planks. Afterwards, players must use the planks to assemble a puzzle. The first male and female player to assemble the puzzle wins. The last-place male player receives a disadvantage for the Final Challenge while the last-place female player is automatically sent to the Arena. As a disadvantage for placing last in the previous challenge, Cara Maria is imposed a three-minute time penalty.
  - Winners: Jenny and Jordan

=== Arena games ===
- Balls In: Each round, players play both offense and defense. The offense player has one attempt to deposit a ball into a goal at the center of a ring (or enter the inner boundary surrounding the ring with the ball) while the defense player attempts to stop them by blocking them and knocking the ball out of bounds. Players then switch roles and repeat the process before the end of the round. The first player to score in two out of three rounds wins.
  - Played by: Amanda vs. Nia, Leroy vs. Tony
- Pole Wrestle: Players begin at the center of a ring with both hands on a pole. The first player to wrestle the pole out of their opponent's hands two out of three times wins.
  - Played by: Aneesa vs. Katie, Derrick vs. Mark
- Hall Brawl: Players must run through a narrow hallway, past/through their opponent and push a button at the opposite end. The player to hit the button first in two of three rounds wins.
  - Played by: Olivia vs. Nurys, Paulie vs. Theo
- Take Shelter: Players have 20 minutes to barricade the entrance to a bunker using provided materials. After those 20 minutes are up, players attempt to break into their opponent's bunker. The first player to break into the bunker and switch on the light inside wins.
  - Played by: Cara Maria vs. KellyAnne, Brandon vs. Ryan
- One Step at a Time: Following the directions/restrictions listed on a board, players must place colored tiles onto a frame one at a time to create a path to the other side of the Arena. Each time they make a mistake, they must remove the incorrect tiles one at a time. The first player to correctly place their path to the other side of the Arena wins.
  - Played by: Averey vs. Jodi, Darrell vs. Tony
- Pick It Up: Players must throw a ball into an overhead track, collect as many bamboo jacks scattered around the Arena as possible, and catch the ball as it rolls out the other end of the track. After catching the ball, players can place the jacks they are holding on a board, and repeat this process until they collect 40 jacks. Each time players miss the ball, they must place the jacks they are holding behind a line further from their original point and collect them from there instead. The first player to collect 40 jacks on their board wins.
  - Played by: Aneesa vs. Jenny, Derrick vs. Horacio
- Getting Hammered: Players must remove 100 nails from a board, hammer them into an adjacent board, then press a button at the center of the Arena. The first player to finish wins.
  - Played by: Emily vs. Tina, CT vs. Nehemiah
- To the Point: Players begin in opposite sides of a cage which has a wall of spikes on each side and dozens of balls in the center for either player to throw. Players attempt to throw the balls onto their opponent's spikes, or block their opponent's shots, while their opponent tries to do the same. If a ball lands in the boundary in front of the wall, it is considered "dead" and can no longer be thrown. The player with the most balls landed on their opponent's spikes once all the balls are used up wins.
  - Played by: Brad vs. Cory, Jonna vs. Rachel
- Boxster-Phobia: Players begin behind a structure containing five sliding doors blocked by rods. They must slide the rods out of the structure to open the doors and make their way to the other end. Each door also has numbers on them which form an equation, the solution of which is the combination to unlock a button at the end of the structure. The first player to make their way through the structure, solve the equation and press their button wins.
  - Played by: Darrell vs. Kyland, Michele vs. Tina
- Fate of the Gladiators: Inspired by the film Gladiator II, players begin inside a boxing ring, with one player designated as the "striker" and the other as the "evader". The striker is blindfolded and attempts to strike as many of the 16 targets on the chest guard the evader is wearing as they can, while the evader tries to avoid them. Players then switch roles and repeat this process. The player who hits the most targets during their turn as striker wins, with ties broken based on time. Additionally, the winners also receive tickets to the world premiere of Gladiator II.
  - Played by: Cory vs. Derrick K., Averey vs. Rachel
- Cable Connection Showdown: Players must untangle a bundle of cords and plug the cords into the corresponding outlet on a motherboard in order to light up a board with all 40 logos of The Challenge to date. The first player to correctly connect the plugs and press a button to light up all 40 logos wins.
  - Played by: Devin vs. Kyland, Kaycee vs. Tori
- Killer Quads: Players begin on quad bikes on opposite sides of a course. They must drive around the course and attempt to catch up to their opponent and take a ribbon hanging from their opponent's bike. The first player to collect their opponent's ribbon two out of three times wins.
  - Played by: Bananas vs. Ryan
- Forty-Fication: Each player has a stack of 40 chained-together crates which they must transfer to their designated square. To release the crates, players must solve math equations and enter the solutions to unlock and remove the chains. The first player to transfer all 40 crates to their designated area wins.
  - Played by: Michele vs. Nia
- Cramping Out: To begin, players place eight poles through their opponent's tube, making it harder for them to crawl through. Each round, players have one minute to crawl through their tube. After both players are through, they compete in a game of "high low" where the first player through their tube guesses whether the next card in a deck is higher or lower in the previous one. The winner gets to add two poles to their opponent's tube for the next round while the loser can only add one pole. This process then repeats until one player is unable to make it through their tube in time, with the time-limit reduced to 30 seconds after an extended period. The last player standing wins.
  - Played by: Bananas vs. Theo
- Stranded: Players assemble a ladder by placing 40 rungs in their correct position within a DNA-shaped frame. Once complete, they must climb the ladder to collect a bag of letter tiles and use the letters to solve the three-word phrase: "Not Eliminated Tonight". The first player to solve the phrase wins.
  - Played by: Michele vs. Olivia
- Coming from Behind: Players alternate rounds playing "offense" and "defense". The offense player attempts to run down a track and ring a bell at the end to score a point. Meanwhile, the defense player runs down a shorter track on the opposite side of a wall, jumps over a hay bale at the end, then attempts to knock the offense player out of bounds before they reach the bell to earn the point instead. The first player to score four points wins.
  - Played by: Cory vs. Josh
- Iron Triangle: Players begin in a triangular cage, where physical contact is permitted, containing a ball inside. Each round, players attempt to retrieve the ball, throw it out of the cage and have it land in an outer circle surrounding the cage to score a point. The first player to score two points wins.
  - Played by: Aviv vs. Jenny
- Closing Time: Players must spin a wheel to open a gate, make their way through before it closes, then carry as many cinder blocks as they can from a platform onto their station at once, repeating this process until they collect all their cinder blocks. Afterwards, players must use the cinder blocks to assemble a puzzle. The first player to finish wins.
  - Played by: Cory vs. Derek C.
- The Final Elimination: Players must tread water in the sea for as long as possible. After two hours, they must keep their hands, and later their elbows, above the surface. The last player standing wins.
  - Played by: Cara Maria vs. Tori

=== Final Challenge ===
For the Final Challenge, players complete a series of checkpoints to earn points based on their placements. Between checkpoints, players are transported by a boat called the Sinister, which serves as the start and end point for each checkpoint, and must remain standing while in transit.

At the start of the Final Challenge, it is revealed that the final placements are determined both by points earned from checkpoints of the Final Challenge, as well as points cast by eliminated players as part of the Karma Vote twist. The male and female player with the most combined points are declared the champions of Battle of the Eras and receive $400,000 each; second place receive $75,000 each; third place receive $25,000 each.

The scoring system was revealed at the end of the Final Challenge. The winning male and female player of each checkpoint receive four points; second place receive three; third receive two; fourth receive one. For the Karma Vote, the male and female player awarded the most points from the eliminated contestants receive eight points added to their score; second receive six; third receive four; fourth receive two.

Day one

- Checkpoint #1 (Sandblast): Players must swim to shore, then run along the beach to collect five puzzle pieces, one at a time, and return them to their puzzle station. Afterwards, they must use the pieces to solve a three-dimensional puzzle before swimming back to the Sinister. As a disadvantage for placing last in the "Fortress Bricks" challenge, Derek C. is imposed a three-minute time penalty.
- Checkpoint #2 (Ghost Ship): Players must swim to a ship where they are instructed to dive to view and memorize a board of symbols underneath the ship, before replicating them at their station using tiles onboard. Afterwards, players must swim back to the Sinister.
- Checkpoint #3 (A Thousand Steps): Players must swim to shore, then follow a trail of 1,000 steps across an island. There, players find signs instructing them to swim 500 metres (547 yd) to a raft offshore to view an image painted on nearby trees, proceed to their puzzle station and replicate the image using blocks. If players recreate the image incorrectly, they must recomplete the trail before they can try again. Afterwards, players must swim back to the Sinister.
- Checkpoint #4 (The Overnight Checkpoint): Each player has a chest and a bag containing thousands of coins. They must count the coins and slot them in the chest for 30 minutes, then spend 30 minutes singing "Show Me the Way to Go Home", repeating this process throughout the night until they have slotted all their coins into the chest. Placements are determined based on how accurately the coins are counted by the end. After slotting all the coins into the chest, players spend the rest of the night on the Sinister.

Day two

- Checkpoint #5 (Submerging Terror): Players swim to a floating platform. From there, they must swim through a cave towards a beach, collect a paddle and return to the platform. Afterwards, players must retrieve a key from a cage submerged under the platform, use it to unlock a bangka boat, then paddle back to the Sinister.
- Checkpoint #6 (Mathematical Leisure): Players swim to an island where they can replenish themselves with coconut water. There, the first two players to arrive compete to answer a math question as fast as possible. The first player to answer correctly can swim back to the Sinister while the defeated player competes against the next player to arrive, with this process repeating for every arriving finalist. The player who loses the final matchup must wait until the second-last player reaches the Sinister before they can return.
- Checkpoint #7 (Champions Cove): Players swim from the Sinister to a buoy where they are instructed to ride an underwater scooter and follow a series of buoys into a cove. There, players must collect a token submerged underwater before riding back to the Sinister where the final results are announced.

Final results

- Winners: Jenny and Rachel ($237,500 each), Jordan ($400,000)
- Runner-up: Derek C. ($75,000)
- Third place: Bananas and Michele ($25,000 each)
- Fourth place: Kyland and Tori

== Game summary ==
Eras phase
#	Challenge	Winners		Era representatives/targets				Arena contestants		Arena game	Arena outcome	
#	Challenge	Era	Contestant	Era I	Era II	Era III	Era IV	Last-place	Winner's pick	Arena game	Winner	Eliminated
1/2	Light It Up	Era III	Tori	—N/a				Nia	Amanda	Balls In	Nia	Amanda
1/2	Light It Up	Era III	Cory	—N/a				Leroy	Tony	Balls In	Tony	Leroy
1/2	Light It Up	Era I	CT	—N/a				Mark	Derrick K.	Pole Wrestle	Derrick K.	Mark
1/2	Light It Up	Era I	Rachel	—N/a				Katie	Aneesa	Pole Wrestle	Aneesa	Katie
1/2	Light It Up	Era IV	Horacio	—N/a				Theo	Paulie	Hall Brawl	Theo	Paulie
1/2	Light It Up	Era IV	Michele	—N/a				Nurys	Olivia	Hall Brawl	Olivia	Nurys
1/2	Light It Up	Era II	Laurel	—N/a				KellyAnne	Cara Maria	Take Shelter	Cara Maria	KellyAnne
1/2	Light It Up	Era II	Bananas	—N/a				Ryan	Brandon	Take Shelter	Ryan	Brandon
3	Gladieater	Era III	Tony	Darrell	Derek C.	—N/a	Kyland	Darrell	—N/a (Note: In episode 3, the winning representatives from Era III, Tony and Averey, failed to reach a decision. This led to a stalemate and resulted in them being sent into the elimination round against Darrell and Jodi, respectively.)	One Step at a Time	Darrell	Tony
3	Gladieater	Era III	Averey	Jodi	Aviv	—N/a	Kaycee	Jodi	—N/a	One Step at a Time	Averey	Jodi
4	Cradled Cranium	Era II	Laurel	Aneesa	—N/a	Nia	Jenny	Jenny	Aneesa	Pick It Up	Jenny	Aneesa
4	Cradled Cranium	Era II	Bananas	Derrick K.	—N/a	Jordan	Horacio	Horacio	Derrick K.	Pick It Up	Derrick K.	Horacio
5	Fast Pass	Era IV	Olivia	Tina	Emily	Tori	—N/a	Tina	Emily	Getting Hammered	Tina	Emily
5	Fast Pass	Era IV	Kyland	CT	Nehemiah	Devin	—N/a	CT	Nehemiah	Getting Hammered	Nehemiah	CT
6	Cloud Catcher	Era IV	Josh	Brad	Bananas	Cory	—N/a	Brad	Cory	To the Point	Cory	Brad
6	Cloud Catcher	Era IV	Jenny	Rachel	Laurel	Jonna	—N/a	Rachel	Jonna	To the Point	Rachel	Jonna
7	Leap of Faith	Era III	Nia	Tina	Aviv	—N/a	Michele	Michele	Tina	Boxster-Phobia	Michele	Tina
7	Leap of Faith	Era III	Jordan	Darrell	Nehemiah	—N/a	Kyland	Kyland	Darrell	Boxster-Phobia	Kyland	Darrell
8	Battle for Honor	Era IV	Jenny	Rachel	Cara Maria	Averey	—N/a	Rachel	Averey	Fate of the Gladiators	Rachel	Averey
8	Battle for Honor	Era IV	Theo	Derrick K.	Derek C.	Cory	—N/a	Derrick K.	Cory	Fate of the Gladiators	Cory	Derrick K.
9	Bottoms Out	Era I	Rachel	—N/a	Ryan	Devin	Kyland	Devin	Kyland	Cable Connection Showdown	Kyland	Devin
9	Bottoms Out	Era I	Rachel	—N/a	Laurel	Tori	Kaycee	Tori	Kaycee	Cable Connection Showdown	Tori	Kaycee
Individual phase
#	Challenge	Gender	Winners	Targets				Arena Contestants		Arena Game	Winner	Eliminated
#	Challenge	Gender	Winners	Targets				Last-place	Winner's pick	Arena Game	Winner	Eliminated
10	Fire Away	Male	Jordan	Bananas	Derek C.	~~Ryan~~		Ryan	Bananas	Killer Quads	Bananas	Ryan
10	Fire Away	Male	Tori	~~Aviv~~	~~Jenny~~	~~Rachel~~		Michele	Bananas	Killer Quads	Bananas	Ryan
11	Building Bridges	Female	Jenny	Michele	~~Nia~~	Olivia		Nia	Michele	Forty-fication	Michele	Nia
11	Building Bridges	Female	Kyland	Michele	~~Nia~~	Olivia		Theo	Michele	Forty-fication	Michele	Nia
12	Duned											Laurel
12	Duned											Nehemiah
12	Duned	Male	Kyland	Bananas	Jordan	~~Nehemiah~~		Theo	Bananas	Cramping Out	Bananas	Theo
12	Duned	Male	Tori	Bananas	Jordan	~~Nehemiah~~		Michele	Bananas	Cramping Out	Bananas	Theo
13	40 Yard Dash	Female	Cara Maria	~~Cara Maria~~	~~Michele~~	Olivia		Michele	Olivia (Note: A winner's choice was not held in episode 13 as Olivia was the only target left to be chosen after Cara Maria won the "40 Yard Dash" challenge and Michele placed last.)	Stranded	Michele	Olivia
13	40 Yard Dash	Female	Jordan	~~Cara Maria~~	~~Michele~~	Olivia		Cory	Olivia	Stranded	Michele	Olivia
14	'Nother Trucker	Male	Derek C.	Bananas	Cory	~~Josh~~		Josh	Cory	Coming from Behind	Cory	Josh
14	'Nother Trucker	Male	Rachel	Bananas	Cory	~~Josh~~		Aviv	Cory	Coming from Behind	Cory	Josh
15	Tight Quarters	Female	Kyland	~~Aviv~~	Jenny	Michele		Aviv	Jenny	Iron Triangle	Jenny	Aviv
15	Tight Quarters	Female	Tori	~~Aviv~~	Jenny	Michele		Bananas	Jenny	Iron Triangle	Jenny	Aviv
16	Fire Plunge	Male	Jordan	Cory	~~Derek C.~~	~~Jordan~~		Derek C.	Cory (Note: A winner's choice was not held in episode 16 as Cory was the only target left to be chosen after Jordan won the "Fire Plunge" challenge and Derek C. placed last.)	Closing Time	Derek C.	Cory
16	Fire Plunge	Male	Tori	Cory	~~Derek C.~~	~~Jordan~~		Cara Maria	Cory	Closing Time	Derek C.	Cory
17	Fortress Bricks	Female	Jordan	Cara Maria	~~Jenny~~	Rachel		Tori	Cara Maria	The Final Elimination	Tori	Cara Maria
17	Fortress Bricks	Female	Jenny	Cara Maria	~~Jenny~~	Rachel		Derek C.	Cara Maria	The Final Elimination	Tori	Cara Maria
18/19	Final Challenge	Male	Jordan	2nd: Derek C.; 3rd: Bananas; 4th: Kyland								
18/19	Final Challenge	Female	Jenny	3rd: Michele; 4th: Tori								
18/19	Final Challenge	Female	Rachel	3rd: Michele; 4th: Tori								

=== Episode progress ===
Contestants	Episodes																
Contestants	1/2	3	4	5	6	7	8	9	10	11	12	13	14	15	16	17	Finale
Jenny	SAFE	SAFE	ELIM	SAFE	WIN	SAFE	WIN	SAFE	RISK	WIN	SAFE	SAFE	SAFE	ELIM	SAFE	WIN	WINNER
Jordan	SAFE	SAFE	RISK	SAFE	SAFE	WIN	SAFE	SAFE	WIN	SAFE	RISK	WIN	SAFE	SAFE	WIN	WIN	WINNER
Rachel	WIN	SAFE	SAFE	SAFE	ELIM	SAFE	ELIM	WIN	RISK	SAFE	SAFE	SAFE	WIN	SAFE	SAFE	RISK	WINNER
Derek C.	SAFE	RISK	SAFE	SAFE	SAFE	SAFE	RISK	SAFE	RISK	SAFE	SAFE	SAFE	WIN	SAFE	ELIM	LOSE	SECOND
Bananas	WIN	SAFE	WIN	SAFE	RISK	SAFE	SAFE	SAFE	ELIM	SAFE	ELIM	SAFE	RISK	LOSE	SAFE	SAFE	THIRD
Michele	WIN	SAFE	SAFE	SAFE	SAFE	ELIM	SAFE	SAFE	LOSE	ELIM	LOSE	ELIM	SAFE	RISK	SAFE	SAFE	THIRD
Kyland	SAFE	RISK	SAFE	WIN	SAFE	ELIM	SAFE	ELIM	SAFE	WIN	WIN	SAFE	SAFE	WIN	SAFE	SAFE	FOURTH
Tori	WIN	SAFE	SAFE	RISK	SAFE	SAFE	SAFE	ELIM	WIN	SAFE	WIN	SAFE	SAFE	WIN	WIN	ELIM	FOURTH
Cara Maria	ELIM	SAFE	SAFE	SAFE	SAFE	SAFE	RISK	SAFE	SAFE	SAFE	SAFE	WIN	SAFE	SAFE	LOSE	OUT	
Cory	WIN	SAFE	SAFE	SAFE	ELIM	SAFE	ELIM	SAFE	SAFE	SAFE	SAFE	LOSE	ELIM	SAFE	OUT		
Aviv	SAFE	RISK	SAFE	SAFE	SAFE	RISK	SAFE	SAFE	RISK	SAFE	SAFE	SAFE	LOSE	OUT			
Josh	SAFE	SAFE	SAFE	SAFE	WIN	SAFE	SAFE	SAFE	SAFE	SAFE	SAFE	SAFE	OUT				
Olivia	ELIM	SAFE	SAFE	WIN	SAFE	SAFE	SAFE	SAFE	SAFE	RISK	SAFE	OUT					
Theo	ELIM	SAFE	SAFE	SAFE	SAFE	SAFE	WIN	SAFE	SAFE	LOSE	OUT						
Nehemiah	SAFE	SAFE	SAFE	ELIM	SAFE	RISK	SAFE	SAFE	SAFE	SAFE	LAST						
Laurel	WIN	SAFE	WIN	SAFE	RISK	SAFE	SAFE	RISK	SAFE	SAFE	LAST						
Nia	ELIM	SAFE	RISK	SAFE	SAFE	WIN	SAFE	SAFE	SAFE	OUT							
Ryan	ELIM	SAFE	SAFE	SAFE	SAFE	SAFE	SAFE	RISK	OUT								
Kaycee	SAFE	RISK	SAFE	SAFE	SAFE	SAFE	SAFE	OUT									
Devin	SAFE	SAFE	SAFE	RISK	SAFE	SAFE	SAFE	OUT									
Derrick K.	ELIM	SAFE	ELIM	SAFE	SAFE	SAFE	OUT										
Averey	SAFE	REP	SAFE	SAFE	SAFE	SAFE	OUT										
Darrell	SAFE	ELIM	SAFE	SAFE	SAFE	OUT											
Tina	SAFE	SAFE	SAFE	ELIM	SAFE	OUT											
Jonna	SAFE	SAFE	SAFE	SAFE	OUT												
Brad	SAFE	SAFE	SAFE	SAFE	OUT												
CT	WIN	SAFE	SAFE	OUT													
Emily	SAFE	SAFE	SAFE	OUT													
Horacio	WIN	SAFE	OUT														
Aneesa	ELIM	SAFE	OUT														
Jodi	SAFE	OUT															
Tony	ELIM	LOST															
Brandon	OUT																
KellyAnne	OUT																
Nurys	OUT																
Paulie	OUT																
Katie	OUT																
Mark	OUT																
Leroy	OUT																
Amanda	OUT																

Color key:

The contestant won the Final Challenge
The contestant did not win the Final Challenge
The contestant won the daily challenge, was immune from elimination, and selected the elimination contestants
The contestant's team won the daily challenge, had the power to select the elimination contestants, but could not come to a decision and was sent into the elimination round and won
The contestant was not selected for the elimination round
The contestant was nominated for the elimination round (as a result of being a representative or target) but was not selected to compete
The contestant placed last in the daily challenge and received a disadvantage at the next challenge
The contestant won the elimination in the elimination round
The contestant lost in the elimination round and was eliminated
The contestant placed last in the challenge and was eliminated
The contestant's team won the daily challenge, had the power to select the elimination contestants, but could not come to a decision and was sent into the elimination round, lost and was eliminated

=== Final Challenge scoreboard ===
Contestant	Checkpoint							Karma	Total	Placement
Contestant	1	2	3	4	5	6	7	Karma	Total	Placement
Jenny	3	4	4	2	4	4	1	2	24	1st
Jordan	4	4	4	3	4	4	4	4	31	1st
Rachel	1	2	2	4	2	2	3	8	24	1st
Derek C.	3	2	2	4	3	3	2	8	27	2nd
Bananas	2	3	3	1	2	1	3	2	17	3rd
Michele	4	1	3	3	1	3	4	4	23	3rd
Kyland	1	1	1	2	1	2	1	6	15	4th
Tori	2	3	1	1	3	1	2	6	19	4th

== Episodes ==
No. overall	No. in season	Title	Original release date	US viewers (millions)
546	1	"The Era Invitational, Part 1"	August 14, 2024	0.43
547	2	"The Era Invitational, Part 2"	August 21, 2024	0.47
548	3	"A Fatal Era"	August 28, 2024	0.41
549	4	"My Trivia Era"	September 4, 2024	0.48
550	5	"An Era Tradition"	September 18, 2024	0.41
551	6	"My Real Friends Era"	September 25, 2024	0.38
552	7	"Trust in Your Era"	October 2, 2024	0.52
553	8	"The Era of the Gladiator"	October 9, 2024	0.38
554	9	"An Era of One"	October 16, 2024	0.38
555	10	"A New Era"	October 23, 2024	0.40
556	11	"Payback Era"	October 30, 2024	0.40
557	12	"The Era of the Purge"	November 6, 2024	0.42
558	13	"Best Friends 4Era"	November 13, 2024	0.42
559	14	"Swinging Era"	November 20, 2024	0.34
560	15	"Thinking Thin Era"	December 4, 2024	0.48
561	16	"Must Win Era"	December 11, 2024	0.45
562	17	"Location Change Era"	December 18, 2024	0.42
563	18	"The End of An Era, Part 1"	January 1, 2025	0.42
564	19	"The End of An Era, Part 2"	January 8, 2025	0.57

=== Reunion special ===
The two-part reunion special aired on January 15 and January 22, 2025 and was hosted by entertainment personality Maria Menounos. The reunion was filmed in October 2024 in Amsterdam, Netherlands.

== Reception ==
The season received a nomination in the "Outstanding Reality Competition Program" category at the 36th GLAAD Media Awards.
