= The Real World: Austin =

Coordinates: 30°15′53″N 97°44′28″W

- Season 16
- The cast of The Real World: Austin
- Starring: Wes Bergmann; Lacey Buehler; Rachel Moyal; Nehemiah Clark; Johanna Botta; Danny Jamieson; Melinda Stolp
- No. of episodes: 24

Release
- Original network: MTV
- Original release: June 21 – November 22, 2005

Season chronology
- ← Previous; The Real World: Philadelphia Next → The Real World: Key West

The Real World: Austin is the sixteenth season of MTV's reality television series The Real World, which focuses on a group of diverse strangers living together for several months in a different city each season, as cameras follow their lives and interpersonal relationships. It is the second season to be filmed in the West South Central States region of the United States, specifically in Texas.

The season featured seven people who lived in a converted warehouse, which production started from January to May 2005. Consisting of 24 episodes, the season premiered on June 21 later that year and was watched by nearly 4 million viewers. The Real World: Austin won "Favorite Season" at the 2008 The Real World Awards Bash.

In 2019, the season was made available for streaming on Facebook Watch (alongside the seventeenth and twenty-eighth seasons) ahead of The Real World: Atlanta's premiere.

== Assignment ==
Almost every season of The Real World, beginning with its fifth season, has included the assignment of a season-long group job or task to the housemates, continued participation in which has been mandatory to remain part of the cast since the Back to New York season. The Austin cast had to shoot, edit and direct their own documentary on the South by Southwest music festival. Their "boss" was Paul Stekler, an award-winning documentary filmmaker who taught at the University of Texas.

== The residence ==
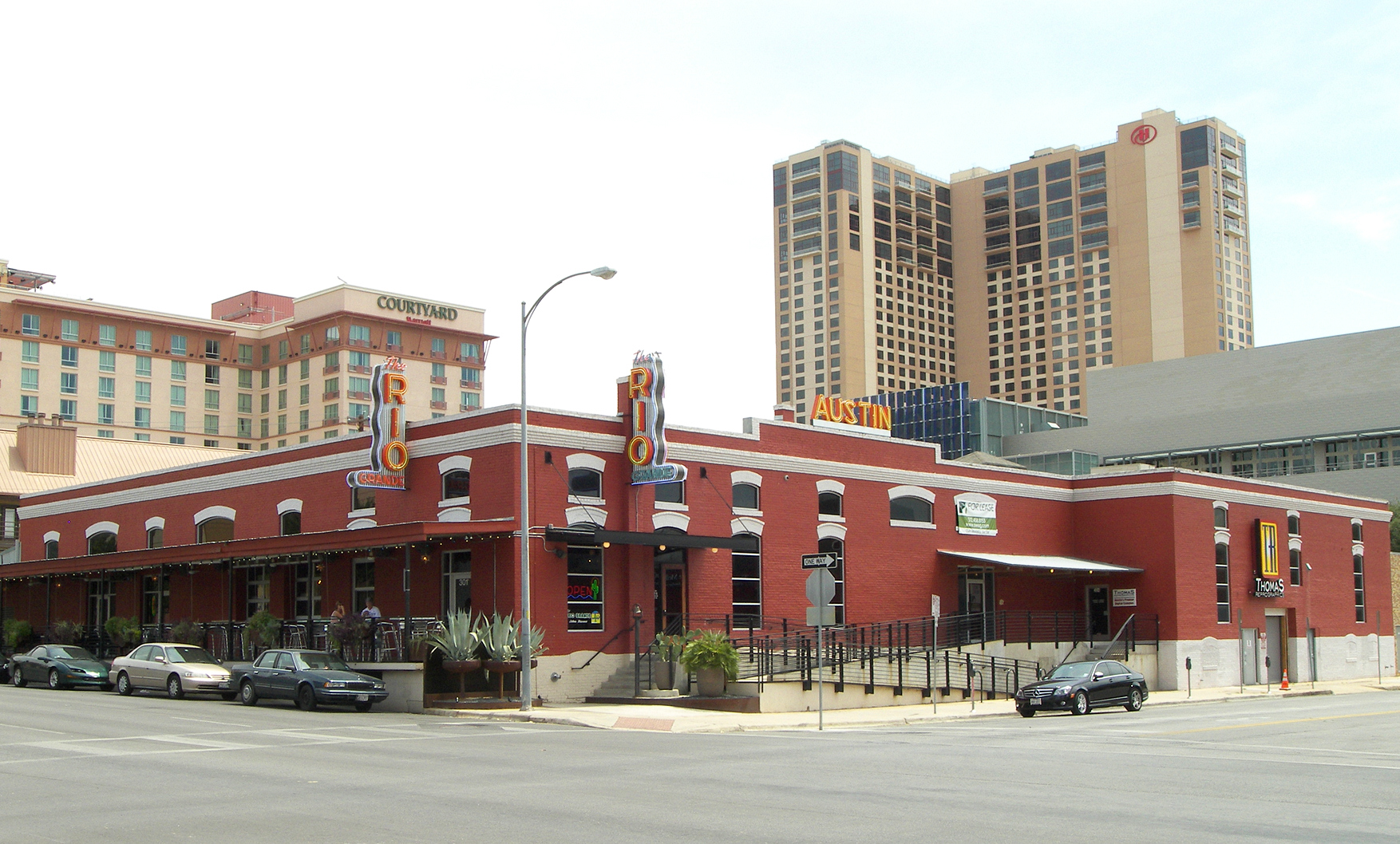
The San Jacinto Boulevard warehouse where the cast resided

This season the cast was housed in the west half of a 23,552-square-foot (2,188.1 m^{2}) warehouse at 301 San Jacinto Boulevard at East 3rd Street in Austin, Texas, 8,000 square feet (740 m^{2}) of which were used for filming. The interior used for the series was designed by Austin designer Joel Mozersky. Construction took three and a half weeks. 44 cameras were mounted on walls for filming. After filming ended, the warehouse was completely gutted. The west half of it was turned into a Mexican restaurant called The Rio Grande. The east half was leased to a printing services company. The house was converted into the Vince Young Steakhouse, which opened in November 2010.

== Cast ==
Cast member	Age^{1}	Hometown
Danny Jamieson	21	Billerica, Massachusetts
MTV.com describes Danny as a humble, sensitive, attractive, and assertive man. Before filming he wanted to become a lawyer, but has chosen to help his father with the family business first.
Johanna Botta	21	Riverside, California
Johanna is Peruvian, born in Lima, Peru, who moved to the U.S. when she was eleven, and had been living in Southern California when she was cast. She aspires to be a clinical therapist, specializing in marriage and counseling for families. MTV.com describes her as highly opinionated and argumentative.
Lacey Buehler	23	Tallahassee, Florida
Lacey was raised by ex-hippie-turned devoutly religious parents who raised her in a strict manner, monitoring the TV and movies that she viewed. This made socialization at school difficult for her, but according to MTV, has given her a unique style.
Melinda Stolp	21	Germantown, Wisconsin
Melinda is an aspiring dentist working as a waitress when she was cast. MTV.com describes her "sexy, creative, and quick witted", and as a "once shy girl [who] has completely come out of her shell and truly lives by the saying 'I will try anything once.'" She had a boyfriend, but she fell in love with castmate Danny.
Nehemiah Clark	19	Rancho Cucamonga, California
Nehemiah was born to a mother who was currently in rehab, and mtv.com describes his life as "a combination of heartbreaking and hopeful", and Nehemiah himself as a "bright, charismatic young man who has the wisdom and experience of someone far beyond his years."
Rachel Moyal	21	Valencia, California
Rachel is a Jewish former U.S. Army combat nurse and Iraq War veteran who enlisted in the military to pay for college. According to mtv.com, her military experience made her resilient, confident, and outspoken. According to MTV, she possesses a high sex drive, and sees Jenna Jameson as her hero, which may call into question whether she will be able to remain faithful to her boyfriend, whom she met in Iraq.
Wes Bergmann	19	Leawood, Kansas
MTV.com describes Wes, a junior and a frat boy at Arizona State University, as an "obnoxious, super-competitive jock", "the guy you love to hate", but also "bright and entrepreneurial." He cannot wait to graduate so he can start his own business.

^Note 1: Age at the time of filming.

== Episodes ==
No. overall	No. in season	Title	Original release date
340	1	"Howdy, Welcome to Austin!"	June 21, 2005
The Austin cast is introduced: Rachel, who served as a combat nurse in Iraq; free-spirited Melinda, from Milwaukee; Johanna, who works in a children's shelter; virginal Lacey, who works in a beauty salon in Tallahassee and has a steady boyfriend; sheltered Danny, from Billerica; competitive Wes, from near Kansas City; and Nehemiah, from Mesa.
341	2	"Chaos on 6th Street"	June 21, 2005
The housemates settle into their quarters and bond in a hot tub. Both Danny and Wes are interested in Melinda. Johanna is attracted to Danny and wonders if he will reciprocate. Nehemiah is strongly attracted to Johanna. The group goes out drinking on the second night, Johanna asks Nehemiah to not let her drink too much and watch out for her. But when he tries to intercede at a bar, she pushes him away and Nehemiah leaves so as not to get into a fight with some of the locals who come to Johanna's aid. Danny and Wes run outside looking for Nehemiah and run into some local revelers. A fistfight erupts between the housemates and several townies. As a drunk Danny is pushed down in the street, one of the men smashes his face with his fist and the men run off. Danny sustains a severe fracture of the zygomatic bone surrounding his left eye, which will require surgery to fix.
342	3	"One Man's Loss; Another's Gain"	June 28, 2005
Melinda breaks up with her boyfriend and grows closer to Danny. The housemates are taken to the outskirts of Austin where they meet John Pierson, an independent film maker with the Austin Film Society. They learn that their Real World job assignment will be creating a 15-minute documentary on the music and film festival South by Southwest, under the supervision of Paul Stekler, a professor and documentary film maker at the University of Texas-Austin.
343	4	"Danny's Surgery"	July 5, 2005
Melinda dotes on Danny, who is nervous about his surgery and the arrival of his father. Rachel is attracted to Wes but the feelings are not reciprocated. Wes pines for Johanna, who meanwhile is attracted to Leo, the bartender at a club they frequent. Wes decides to bide his time, confident that he will conquer Johanna at some point.
344	5	"Love & War"	July 12, 2005
The housemates go out drinking while Danny stays home recuperating. Rachel and Nehemiah get into a heated argument when Nehemiah questions her combat service in the Iraq War. The next morning they meet PJ and Jenn, assistants of Stek, for some training on the cameras. Nehemiah writes an apology to Rachel and the two talk and begin to see each other's side in the anti-war argument. Danny becomes jealous when he learns about the kiss between Melinda and Wes.
345	6	"First Dates"	July 19, 2005
Wes and Nehemiah continue their hook-up competition by inviting a bevy of girls over to the house for a party. Although fond of her boyfriend Erik in Iraq, Rachel wants to use the Real World experience to play the field and learn if her boyfriend is really right for her. She meets a bouncer named Collin and the two go out on a date and cuddle in bed afterwards. Wes learns from a friend that Collin has a girlfriend and isn't interested in Rachel; he divulges the information to Rachel who is merely amused.
346	7	"Mel and Danny Get Up Close and Personal"	July 26, 2005
Danny, who has finally recovered from his injuries, seeks to emulate Wes and Nehemiah's partying ways by hitting the bars. Melinda, however, threatens to end their relationship if he brings anyone home.
347	8	"A Heartbreaking Valentine's Day"	August 2, 2005
Danny spends Valentine's Day with Melinda, buys her flowers and plans to take her out to a romantic dinner. However, he receives the tragic news from his dad that his mother died earlier in the day.
348	9	"Heading Home"	August 9, 2005
Melinda worries that Danny, who is home burying his mother, may not return to Austin. Nehemiah recalls Danny's words of deep regret that he couldn't have been with his mother when she died. He re-evaluates his own relationship with his mother, who has an alcohol and addiction problem similar to Danny's mom. Lacey's boyfriend Ryan comes to visit. Although Ryan is a paraplegic due to a car accident, the other housemates marvel at how full of life he is and note the deep love Lacey feels for him.
349	10	"Jo and Leo Sittin' in a Tree?"	August 16, 2005
The housemates get an assignment to video-tape a rock band playing at a local bar. Leo joins them and afterwards he and Johanna retire to the house. Although Leo attempts to put some moves on her, Johanna acts coy and rebuffs him. A jealous Wes brings home a groupie for sex in an attempt to upset Johanna. Later, Wes accuses Johanna of playing Leo for her own amusement, which angers Johanna but also causes her to reflect.
350	11	"Danny's Back!"	August 23, 2005
The housemates receive their next assignment: filming a raw video portrait of each other, which they will later have to edit. One of Stek's graduate assistants comes over to the house and unlocks a hidden room in the basement, it's an editing room with individual workstations for each housemate. Danny returns but his grief over losing his mother makes it hard for him to resume an intimate relationship with Melinda. Instead of hanging out with her, Danny goes out with the guys, which upsets Melinda. Melinda gets drunk and Danny ends up taking care of her.
351	12	"Things are Heating Up"	August 30, 2005
Rachel has a meltdown during a quarrel with Nehemiah and thinks her outburst is probably symptomatic of Post-Traumatic Stress Disorder due to her Iraq war service. Wes's long-running pursuit of Johanna finally leads to some sexy kissing, but he seems over his crush on her after meeting a new girl, Wren.
352	13	"Trouble's in the Air"	September 6, 2005
Nehemiah is involved in a street brawl, putting his Real World future and good relations with his housemates at risk. To make amends, Nehemiah helps Danny edit his video portrait. The roommates complete their assignments and begin quarreling about which bands they want to feature in their documentary on South by Southwest.
353	14	"Ranchin' It"	September 13, 2005
Melinda arranges a weekend excursion to a ranch for the housemates. After they return home, Melinda and Danny have a heart-to-heart about their relationship.
354	15	"Johanna's Jailbreak"	September 20, 2005
Danny writes Melinda a letter that details his feelings for her; and they later run into each other at a bar. Johanna is arrested for public intoxication.
355	16	"Jo and Leo: To Be or Not To Be?"	September 27, 2005
Wes becomes frustrated as Johanna and Leo grow closer. The bartender spends the night, but then fails to call her. As a result, Johanna visits him at work and doesn't like what she hears from him.
356	17	"The Best Documentarians Yet"	October 4, 2005
Danny asks Melinda to be his girlfriend. In other events, the housemates start filming the documentary and learn they have a week to put together a rough cut.
357	18	"SxSW All the Way"	October 11, 2005
The housemates work on their South by Southwest documentary; and hang out with the band Halifax. Later, Danny, Wes and Rachel set out to interview the band Hellogoodbye, but can't find their campsite. Lacey is caught on film talking trash about Rachel.
358	19	"Love Hurts"	October 18, 2005
Rachel's boyfriend Erik visits with her dog Reese in tow. Danny helps the police search for the guy who punched him.
359	20	"The Pressure's On"	October 25, 2005
With the deadline on the documentary looming, the housemates leave the editing to budding filmmaker Nehemiah. The night before the film is due to premiere at the Austin Film Society, however, he heads out to a club, and Lacey and Melinda take turns editing the project. The housemates learn that they will be vacationing in Costa Rica.
360	21	"Watch Out, Costa Rica"	November 1, 2005
The housemates vacation in Costa Rica. Wes pretends to be Prince Harry to impress some women; a drunken Danny misunderstands something Melinda says and leaves her at a bar.
361	22	"Nehemiah's Actin' Up"	November 8, 2005
The housemates meet Ondi Timoner, the director of the documentary Dig!; and she gives Nehemiah professional advice. Wes and Johanna flirt at a bar, which makes Wren jealous.
362	23	"Who's In Jail?"	November 15, 2005
The roommates have to post bail for Nehemiah who is arrested for assault.
363	24	"Goodbye Austin"	November 22, 2005
The gang says goodbye to each other and Austin. Danny and Melinda contemplate their future. Wren slaps Wes for bragging to the roommates about having sex with her. In return, Wes confronts Rachel, who told Wren about it.

== After filming ==
Six months after the cast left the Real World house, all seven of them appeared to discuss their experiences both during and since their time on the show, Tex, Hugs, & Rock 'n' Roll: The Real World Austin Reunion, which premiered on November 29, 2005, and was hosted by Susie Castillo.

The four female cast mates posed in lingerie for a cover feature in Stuff magazine.

At the 2008 The Real World Awards Bash, the Austin season won "Favorite Season", Danny and Melinda won "Favorite Love Story" and Johanna won "Best Dance-Off". The cast also received a nomination for "Steamiest Scene", Melinda was nominated for "Hottest Female", Danny for "Hottest Male", Johanna for "Best Brush with the Law", Rachel for "Best Meltdown".

When filming ended Melinda moved to Boston to be with Danny. A film crew followed them in New York City as they took a carriage ride through Central Park and he proposed before the reunion show. On August 2, 2008, they married at Castle Hill outside Boston, with most of their former cast members among those in attendance. Danny owns a construction company while Melinda is planning a career in dentistry. During the premiere of The Challenge: Cutthroat, Melinda revealed in a confessional that she and Danny were going through a divorce. In 2016, Melinda married Matt Collins. Their first child, Camden, was born in 2019. After suffering a miscarriage, their second child, Hayden Thomas, was born in 2022.

Wes and Johanna announced during the reunion show that they began dating several months after the conclusion of filming the show. They appeared together on Real World/Road Rules Challenge: Fresh Meat, and Wes promised to use his prize money to pay for the engagement ring as he won the Real World/Road Rules Challenge: The Duel. At the Real World/Road Rules Challenge: The Gauntlet III reunion show Johanna announced that she and Wes were no longer together. During the reunion special for Real World/Road Rules Challenge: The Island, it was revealed that KellyAnne Judd from The Real World: Sydney was dating Wes at the time. Wes and Johanna both appeared on the Real World/Road Rules Challenge: The Ruins (as did KellyAnne Judd), during the season they experienced interpersonal conflicts stemming from the game and relationship issues. In a clip from Real World/Road Rules Challenge: The Ruins reunion, which aired on December 16, 2009, Wes and KellyAnne revealed that they were no longer a couple.

Johanna married Willem Marx. Together they have a child, Diego.

Wes proposed to Amanda Hornick in September 2016 at a Royals baseball game and got married in June 2018. Former roommates Lacey, Melinda, Rachel, Nehemiah and The Challenge costar Devin Walker-Molaghan were in attendance. The couple's first daughter was born on September 28, 2023. Outside of The Challenge, Wes competed on the second season of House of Villains, the twenty-eighth season of Worst Cooks in America, and the third season of The Traitors.

=== The Challenge ===
This is the third season of The Real World whose entire cast has competed on The Real World/Road Rules Challenge. The first two are The Real World: Boston and The Real World: New Orleans.

Cast member	Seasons of The Challenge	Other appearances
Danny Jamieson	Fresh Meat, The Inferno 3, The Gauntlet III, The Ruins, Fresh Meat II, Battle of the Seasons (2012)	—N/a
Johanna Botta	Fresh Meat, The Gauntlet III, The Island, The Ruins	—N/a
Lacey Buehler	Battle of the Seasons (2012)	—N/a
Melinda Stolp	Fresh Meat, The Gauntlet III, Cutthroat (2010), Battle of the Seasons (2012)	The Challenge: All Stars (season 2), The Challenge: All Stars (season 3)
Nehemiah Clark	The Duel, The Gauntlet III, The Duel II, Rivals, Battle of the Eras	The Challenge: All Stars (season 1), The Challenge: All Stars (season 2), The Challenge: All Stars (season 3)
Rachel Moyal	The Inferno 3, The Gauntlet III	—N/a
Wes Bergmann	Fresh Meat, The Duel, The Ruins, Fresh Meat II, Rivals, Battle of the Exes, Battle of the Seasons (2012), Rivals II, Battle of the Exes II, Rivals III, War of the Worlds, War of the Worlds 2, Total Madness, Double Agents	Spring Break Challenge, The Challenge: Champs vs. Pros, The Challenge: Champs vs. Stars (season 1), The Challenge: Champs vs. Stars (season 2), The Challenge: All Stars (season 3), The Challenge: World Championship, The Challenge: USA (season 2)
