= Real World/Road Rules Challenge: Fresh Meat =

12th season of the reality television series

Fresh Meat
- Season 12
- Presented by: T. J. Lavin
- No. of contestants: 24
- Winners: Darrell Taylor; Aviv Melmed
- Location: Myocum, Australia
- Opening theme: "Good to Go" performed by General Midi
- No. of episodes: 16

Release
- Original network: MTV
- Original release: May 29 – September 11, 2006

Season chronology
- ← Previous; The Gauntlet 2 Next → The Duel

Real World/Road Rules Challenge: Fresh Meat is the 12th season of the MTV reality game show, The Challenge (at the time known as Real World/Road Rules Challenge).

Fresh Meat is the first season to include previously unknown contestants as part of the cast. Previous to Fresh Meat, all seasons functioned solely by the program's trademark: strictly using contestants that were previously cast on past seasons of The Real World or Road Rules.

Filmed in Australia, Fresh Meat featured two-player teams; each team had an alumnus of The Real World or Road Rules partnered with a newcomer to the series (collectively known as the "Fresh Meat"). A launch special aired May 22, 2006, a week before the season premiere.

This is the first edition of the Fresh Meat series, with Fresh Meat II following in 2010.

== Format ==
Prior to the season, each of the 12 newcomers (referred to as "Fresh Meat") participates in a series of challenges to test their skills. Each alumnus selects one of the rookies of the opposite sex to be their partner for the entire season, using the stats from the pre-season challenges.

In odd-numbered episodes, teams participate in a challenge. (Challenges are sometimes called "missions.") The winner of the challenge has immunity from going into Exile, and selects one team to go into Exile. They also get the chance to pick the order in the next challenge. The remaining teams get together to vote for the other Exile team; the winning team and their pick for the Exile are not present during the process. Each individual gets a vote, and voting is not secret. The team with the most votes is picked to go into Exile.

In even-numbered episodes, teams participate in another challenge. If one of the two teams picked for Exile wins the challenge (sometimes referred to on the show as winning the "pardon"), they can select another team to go into Exile in their place, however, they cannot pick the team that won the previous challenge as that team has immunity. They also receive a prize and will get to pick the order in the next challenge. The challenge of this episode is followed by the Exile.

Exile is a race between two teams. Unlike the elimination games of other seasons of The Challenge, the remaining teams do not watch the battle between the two Exile teams. The Exile teams run a course and whoever crosses the finish line first stays, while the other team goes home. Along the way, there are two optional puzzle stations where, if the puzzle is solved correctly, they will get a prize that will benefit them in the race (such as dropping their bags or taking minutes off their total time.) To make matters more difficult, each member will be carrying bags equal to the weight of the luggage they brought to the Challenge.

A car picks them up and they are taken, blindfolded, to the race course. Once the car stops, they must jump out and go on with the race. Both team members must cross the finish line, but it doesn't matter who carries what bags.

Initially, the final challenge was to consist of four teams, with first-place winning $250,000, second place $30,000, third place $20,000 and fourth place winning nothing. However, due to the medical disqualification of Team Coral & Evan, the final challenge only featured three teams, with all finalists winning money.

== Contestants ==
Alumni	Original season	Fresh Meat	Age	Origin	Finish
Darrell Taylor	Road Rules: Campus Crawl	Aviv Melmed	21	Columbus, Ohio	Winners
Tina Barta	Road Rules: South Pacific	Kenny Santucci	22	Cedar Grove, New Jersey	Runners-up
Wes Bergmann	The Real World: Austin	Casey Cooper	18	The Woodlands, Texas	Third place
Derrick Kosinski	Road Rules: X-Treme	Diem Brown	25	Roswell, Georgia	Episode 15
Theo Vonkurnatowski	Road Rules: Maximum Velocity Tour	Chanda Sneed	24	Long Island, New York	Episode 14
Shane Landrum	Road Rules: Campus Crawl	Linette Gallo	21	Palmetto, Florida	Episode 12
Coral Smith	The Real World: Back to New York	Evan Starkman	20	Perth, Ontario	Episode 11 (Note: Prior to the "Batten Down The Hatches" challenge in Episode 11, Coral & Evan were removed from the competition due to their injuries. Evan initially suffered a ruptured hernia in Episode 7, and defied doctor's orders throughout the next three episodes, while Coral had a severe breathing problem and suffered a kneecap injury after the "Human Ox-Pull" challenge in Episode 10.)
Katie Doyle	Road Rules: The Quest	Eric Banks	23	Nicholasville, Kentucky	Episode 10
Tonya Cooley	The Real World: Chicago	Johnnie McBride	24	Savannah, Georgia	Episode 8
Johanna Botta	The Real World: Austin	Jesse Stark	19	Albuquerque, New Mexico	Episode 6
Melinda Stolp	The Real World: Austin	Ryan Kehoe	24	Paramus, New Jersey	Episode 4
Danny Jamieson	The Real World: Austin	Evelyn Smith	18	Harrison, New York	Episode 2

=== Teams ===
==== Stats ====
Each of the 12 Fresh Meat cast members participated in a multi-challenge obstacle course, testing their strength, stamina, and mental ability. The multi-challenge obstacle course included:

1. A 40-yard dash
2. A series of wall climbs
3. Precision throwing
4. A brainteaser puzzle

The alumni used the stats from each player's obstacle course performance to determine their partner.

Fresh Meat	40-yard Dash	Up and Over	Hand-Eye Coord.	Logic
Aviv Melmed	6.28 sec	0 min 52.87 sec	0 of 5	0 min 3.16 sec
Casey Cooper	7.22 sec	8 min 59.21 sec	1 of 5	9 min 34.78 sec
Chanda Sneed	5.69 sec	0 min 25.40 sec	0 of 5	12 min 20.29 sec
Diem Brown	7.59 sec	0 min 33.88 sec	0 of 5	3 min 9.14 sec
Eric Banks	6.03 sec	0 min 37.06 sec	2 of 5	11 min 45.72 sec
Evan Starkman	5.66 sec	0 min 12.85 sec	1 of 5	2 min 28.00 sec
Evelyn Smith	6.16 sec	0 min 18.91 sec	1 of 5	1 min 41.89 sec
Jesse Stark	6.15 sec	0 min 15.84 sec	0 of 5	0 min 35.91 sec
Johnnie McBride	5.84 sec	0 min 15.47 sec	1 of 5	2 min 15.40 sec
Kenny Santucci	6.07 sec	0 min 52.87 sec	0 of 5	7 min 14.94 sec
Linette Gallo	7.66 sec	0 min 52.87 sec	0 of 5	0 min 15.92 sec
Ryan Kehoe	6.00 sec	0 min 14.97 sec	0 of 5	22 min 16.85 sec

==== Draft selections ====
Pick #	Alumni	Draft pick	Team	Weight of bags
1	Danny Jamieson	Evelyn Smith	Danny & Evelyn	150 lbs
2	Coral Smith	Evan Starkman	Coral & Evan	—N/a
3	Darrell Taylor	Aviv Melmed	Darrell & Aviv	140 lbs
4	Tonya Cooley	Johnnie McBride	Tonya & Johnnie	253 lbs
5	Theo Vonkurnatowski	Chanda Sneed	Theo & Chanda	186 lbs
6	Tina Barta	Kenny Santucci	Tina & Kenny	164 lbs
7	Wes Bergmann	Casey Cooper	Wes & Casey	113 lbs
8	Johanna Botta	Jesse Stark	Johanna & Jesse	133 lbs
9	Derrick Kosinski	Diem Brown	Derrick & Diem	215 lbs
10	Katie Doyle	Eric Banks	Katie & Eric	216 lbs
11	Melinda Stolp	Ryan Kehoe	Melinda & Ryan	156 lbs
12	Shane Landrum	Linette Gallo	Shane & Linette	171 lbs

== Gameplay ==
=== Challenge games ===
- Stuck On Me: Players are connected to their partners, back-to-back, by a harness, on a 25-foot narrow balance beam that is hanging from the top of the Q1 building. Each team has to walk toward a white line at the end of the beam, then do a full 360° turn, and walk back to the beginning of the beam. The team that walks to the end of the beam and back in the fastest time wins.
  - Winners: Coral & Evan
- Bush Whacked: Twenty tree stumps are placed within a circle — eight on an interior ring, and twelve on the exterior ring. The stumps on the interior ring are two feet high, while the stumps on the exterior ring are three feet high. Each team stands on a designated stump on the interior ring, and has to swing a hanging medicine ball in an attempt to knock an opposing team off their stump. A team is disqualified if one player holds the medicine ball for more than three seconds. The challenge is played in three rounds, and after four teams are eliminated from the first round, each team moves to the three-foot stumps. The last team standing on their designated stump wins.
  - Winners: Coral & Evan
- Hang On: The male players from each team are hanging upside down from leg harnesses, and have to "hang on" to their female partners, while being hoisted 20 feet above water. A team's time stops once a player falls into the water. The team that hangs on the longest time wins.
  - Winners: Coral & Evan
- Jail Break: Players from each team have to escape from a jail cell, by finding three keys that are located inside six bowls of "prison slop." Each player is suited up in "jailbird" jumpsuits, with their hands behind their backs in handcuffs and their legs in shackles. Each player has to search through each bowl of slop using only their faces and mouths. Once a team has found the three keys that are needed to unlock each other's handcuffs and the jail cell, each player will sprint down a 50-yard dash (with their legs still in shackles) to a finish line. The team with the fastest time wins.
  - Winners: Theo & Chanda
- Climber's Paradise: Each team has to ascend up a 25-foot climbing wall, by using pegs of different shapes and colors. Each player has to carry the pegs up, and communicate with each other in order to determine the peg shapes necessary to ascend the wall. A team is disqualified if they do not make it to the top of the wall within a 10-minute time limit, or if one or both players falls off the climbing wall. The team that makes it to the top of the wall and retrieves a flag in the fastest time wins.
  - Winners: Coral & Evan
- Rollin' In Oats: Two tubs of rolled oats are located across a grass field from corresponding deposit tubs. Players from each team have to smother their bodies with oatmeal, then sprint toward their designated deposit tubs, and scrape off the oatmeal from their bodies into the tubs. Each team goes back and forth for a two-minute period, trying to deposit as much oatmeal into their tubs as possible. The team that distributes the heaviest weight of oatmeal into their designated tub wins.
  - Winners: Coral & Evan
- Crossed Paths: A rope that is suspended 25 feet above water connects two platforms, and the goal for each team is for each player to make their way from one platform to the other. Players will meet their teammate midway through, in which they will "cross paths," and make their way toward the opposite platforms. A team is disqualified if one player falls into the water. The team with the fastest time wins.
  - Winners: Theo & Chanda
- Incredible Deflating Kayak: Teams have to inflate a kayak using either their mouths or foot pedals, then paddle their way across to an opposite side of a river, grab their team flag, then paddle their way back to the original launching area. A team has to start over if one or both players sticks their hands or legs outside of the kayak while in the paddling process. Once each team had paddled back to the original launching area, they have to deflate their kayak, and stuff it back in the bags that contained the kayaks. The team with the fastest time wins.
  - Winners: Shane & Linette
- Swimming With Sharks: Teams have to solve a puzzle that is floating on a frame within a shark lagoon. Players from each team have to swim down into the lagoon, relay style, and retrieve the pieces needed to solve the puzzle. A team has ten minutes to assemble the puzzle pieces together, or they will be disqualified. Only one team competes at a time, and all other teams are quarantined in order to avoid getting an advantage prior to their turn. The team that solves a puzzle in the fastest time wins.
  - Winners: Shane & Linette
- Human Ox Pull: Teams have to pull and drag a heavy sled across a dirt field. The challenge is played in multiple rounds, with eight teams split up into two separate teams of four. In the first round, each teams has to drag an 850-pound sled with a bale of hay from one side of a dirt field to another. The first team to drag their sled to the finish line wins the first round. The four winning teams from the first round are then split up into two teams of two, and have to drag a 350-pound sled to the finish line. The team that makes it to the finish line first wins. In the final round, the same process continues, with the final two 2-player teams competing to win the challenge.
  - Winners: Darrell & Aviv
- Batten Down The Hatches: Teams have to make their way up and down a dive boat that is hanging 25 feet above a lake, with rope ladders hanging from both sides. First, each player has to climb down to the bottom of the hanging ladder, with both feet on the bottom rung, then each player has to swing toward their partner and trade ladders, then climb back to the top of the ladder, and into the boat. The team time stops when both partners have made their way back into the boat. The team that climbs back into the boat in the fastest time wins.
  - Winners: Derrick & Diem
- Jump Down Under: Teams have to jump 12 metres (39 ft) from a platform down into a lake, swim 20 feet toward an oversize super launch, then climb atop the launch in the middle of the lake that is supported by a rope ladder, grab their team flag, then swim toward a pair of floating flag poles located 30 feet from the super launch. The team that completes the challenge in the fastest time wins.
  - Winners: Derrick & Diem
- Deep Blue: On a boat traveling along Australia's Gold Coast, teams have to drop 30 feet into the water, from a free-diving sled attached to a boat, retrieve their team flag attached to the bottom of the rope, then hold their breath under water for as long as possible. A team's time stops once a player's head pokes above the water's surface. The team that can hold their breath under water for the longest time wins.
  - Winners: Derrick & Diem
- Target Training: Two teams at a time have to race through dual obstacle courses, grab a pair of paintball guns at the end of the course, knock down four targets, retrieve a 70-pound Aboriginal artifact, then make their way back to the start of the course with the artifact. The team that makes it through the obstacle course, with their artifact, in the fastest time wins $1,500.
  - Winners: Darrell & Aviv
- What a Croc: Teams are placed on a "crocodile wheel," and are spun around until at least one body part touches the end of the wheel, or if one player falls off the wheel, in which a team's time will be stopped. Each team is spun around three times. The team with the longest combined time not only wins an automatic bid in the final challenge, but also chooses two of the final three remaining teams for the last Exile.
  - Winners: Tina & Kenny

=== Exiles ===
Exile is a race between two teams with a start and a finish, and two puzzles in between. The puzzles are optional and can be skipped by the teams, however, teams must grab their flag at each puzzle before proceeding. Puzzles that are completed may result in a reward significant to the remainder of the race. Couples will be carrying bags that, when combined, equal the amount of luggage each cast member brought with them to the Challenge. Couples must carry the bags at all times, unless a reward allows them to drop them.

There are three different Exile courses on this season: Beach, Forest, and Cliffside. Each Exile contains a start, a finish, and two puzzles; however, the terrain of the course may affect a team's performance. Teams that participated on each course are as follows:

- Beach Course: Wes & Casey vs. Danny & Evelyn, Tina & Kenny vs. Katie & Eric, Tina & Kenny vs. Theo & Chanda
- Forest Course: Wes & Casey vs. Melinda & Ryan, Wes & Casey vs. Tonya & Johnnie, Darrell & Aviv vs. Derrick & Diem
- Cliffside Course: Wes & Casey vs. Johanna & Jesse, Wes & Casey vs. Shane & Linette

=== Final challenge ===
- Miles of Exile: The three remaining teams compete in a 10-mile sprint along the beach, with teammates roped to each other, and have to encounter several checkpoints and solve two puzzles. At the first checkpoint, each team has to run outside of buoys, through the water, to the second checkpoint, which is a "peg-jumping" puzzle station. There are four sandbags that weigh 25 pounds each next to an empty duffle bag. Each team will be given three attempts to correctly solve a puzzle. If a team solves the puzzle on the first attempt, they will be allowed to continue to the next checkpoint without having to carry any sandbags into their designated duffle bag. After the second unsuccessful attempt, a team will be required to add 50 pounds to their designated duffle bag. If a team does not correctly solve a puzzle after the third attempt, that team will be required to add all four sandbags to their duffle bag, and carry it to the next checkpoint. Darrell & Aviv solved the puzzle after the third attempt, in which they were required to add 50 pounds to their duffle bag, while Tina & Kenny and Wes Casey each failed to solve the puzzles after three attempts. The third checkpoint is "Military Crawl," in which each team has to crawl under military-style posts, but have to drag their duffle bags under the posts, and are not allowed to throw their duffle bags over the posts. After the military crawl, each team must still carry the weight of their designated duffle bags to the fourth checkpoint, "Carry Your Partner," in which the male partners carry their female partners to the next checkpoint while continuing to carry their duffle bags until they reach a sign that says "continue to your next checkpoint." The fifth checkpoint is "Stick Squares" puzzle station, in which teams must make two equal squares by moving four sticks. This puzzle station is the reverse of the first puzzle station, in which teams can remove all 100 pounds from their duffle bags if they correctly solve a puzzle on their first attempt, 50 pounds if they solve a puzzle on a second attempt, but will be required to carry the weight of all sandbags if they do not correctly solve a puzzle after the third attempt. Darrell & Aviv correctly solved the puzzle after the first attempt, in which they removed all weight from their duffle bags. Neither Tina & Kenny nor Wes & Casey solved the second puzzle after three attempts, and were forced to carry all of the weight of their duffle bags up a mountain side to the finish line.
  - Winners: Darrell & Aviv (won $250,000)
  - Second place: Tina & Kenny (won $30,000)
  - Third place: Wes & Casey (won $20,000)

== Game summary ==
Episode		Winners	Exile contestants		Exile game	Exile outcome	
#	Challenge	Winners	Winners' pick	Voted In	Exile game	Winners	Eliminated
1	Stuck On Me	Coral & Evan	Wes & Casey	Danny & Evelyn			
2	Bush Whacked	Coral & Evan			Beach Course	Wes & Casey	Danny & Evelyn
3	Hang On	Coral & Evan	Melinda & Ryan	Wes & Casey			
4	Jail Break	Theo & Chanda			Forest Course	Wes & Casey	Melinda & Ryan
5	Climber's Paradise	Coral & Evan	Wes & Casey	Johanna & Jesse			
6	Rollin' In Oats	Coral & Evan			Cliffside Course	Wes & Casey	Johanna & Jesse
7	Crossed Paths	Theo & Chanda	Wes & Casey	Tonya & Johnnie			
8	Incredible Deflating Kayak	Shane & Linette			Forest Course	Wes & Casey	Tonya & Johnnie
9	Swimming With Sharks	Shane & Linette	Katie & Eric	Tina & Kenny			
10	Human Ox Pull	Darrell & Aviv			Beach Course	Tina & Kenny	Katie & Eric
11	Batten Down The Hatches	Derrick & Diem	Shane & Linette	Wes & Casey			
12	Jump Down Under	Derrick & Diem			Cliffside Course	Wes & Casey	Shane & Linette
13	Deep Blue	Derrick & Diem	Theo & Chanda	Darrell & Aviv			
14	Target Training	Darrell & Aviv	Tina & Kenny (Note: Darrell & Aviv won a pardon from going into Exile in Episode 14 and chose Tina & Kenny to go in their place. This is the only time that a team won a pardon.)		Beach Course	Tina & Kenny	Theo & Chanda
15	What A Croc	Tina & Kenny	Darrell & Aviv	—N/a (Note: Tina & Kenny had to choose both Exile teams in Episode 15 rather than just one team.)	Forest Course	Darrell & Aviv	Derrick & Diem
15	What A Croc	Tina & Kenny	Derrick & Diem	—N/a	Forest Course	Darrell & Aviv	Derrick & Diem
16	Miles of Exile	Darrell & Aviv	2nd place: Tina & Kenny; 3rd place: Wes & Casey				

=== Elimination progress ===
Teams	Episodes															
Teams	1	2	3	4	5	6	7	8	9	10	11	12	13	14	15	Finale
Darrell & Aviv	SAFE	SAFE	SAFE	SAFE	SAFE	SAFE	SAFE	SAFE	SAFE	WIN	SAFE	SAFE	NOM	WON	ELIM	WINNERS
Tina & Kenny	SAFE	SAFE	SAFE	SAFE	SAFE	SAFE	SAFE	SAFE	NOM	ELIM	SAFE	SAFE	SAFE	EXILE	WIN	SECOND
Wes & Casey	NOM	ELIM	NOM	ELIM	NOM	ELIM	NOM	ELIM	SAFE	SAFE	NOM	ELIM	SAFE	SAFE	SAFE	THIRD
Derrick & Diem	SAFE	SAFE	SAFE	SAFE	SAFE	SAFE	SAFE	SAFE	SAFE	SAFE	WIN	WIN	WIN	SAFE	OUT	
Theo & Chanda	SAFE	SAFE	SAFE	WIN	SAFE	SAFE	WIN	SAFE	SAFE	SAFE	SAFE	SAFE	NOM	OUT		
Shane & Linette	SAFE	SAFE	SAFE	SAFE	SAFE	SAFE	SAFE	WIN	WIN	SAFE	NOM	OUT				
Coral & Evan	WIN	WIN	WIN	SAFE	WIN	WIN	SAFE	SAFE	SAFE	SAFE	MED					
Katie & Eric	SAFE	SAFE	SAFE	SAFE	SAFE	SAFE	SAFE	SAFE	NOM	OUT						
Tonya & Johnnie	SAFE	SAFE	SAFE	SAFE	SAFE	SAFE	NOM	OUT								
Johanna & Jesse	SAFE	SAFE	SAFE	SAFE	NOM	OUT										
Melinda & Ryan	SAFE	SAFE	NOM	OUT												
Danny & Evelyn	NOM	OUT														

The team won the competition
The team did not win the final challenge
The team won the challenge
The team won the challenge and a pardon
The team was selected for the Exile
The team won the Exile
The team was put into Exile by the team that won a pardon and won
The team lost in the Exile and was eliminated
The team was removed from the competition due to medical reasons

== Voting progress ==
Winner's Pick	Wes & Casey; 1 of 1 vote	Melinda & Ryan; 1 of 1 vote	Wes & Casey; 1 of 1 vote	Wes & Casey; 1 of 1 vote	Katie & Eric; 1 of 1 vote	Shane & Linette; 1 of 1 vote	Theo & Chanda; 1 of 1 vote	Tina & Kenny; 1 of 1 vote	Darrell & Aviv; 1 of 1 vote
Winner's Pick	Wes & Casey; 1 of 1 vote	Melinda & Ryan; 1 of 1 vote	Wes & Casey; 1 of 1 vote	Wes & Casey; 1 of 1 vote	Katie & Eric; 1 of 1 vote	Shane & Linette; 1 of 1 vote	Theo & Chanda; 1 of 1 vote	Tina & Kenny; 1 of 1 vote	Derrick & Diem; 1 of 1 vote
Voted Into Exile	Danny & Evelyn; 10 of 20 votes	Wes & Casey; 16 of 18 votes	Johanna & Jesse; 10 of 12 votes (Note: Some of the votes were not shown during the episode.)	Tonya & Johnnie; 10 of 14 votes	Tina & Kenny; 11 of 12 votes	Wes & Casey; 6 of 8 votes	Darrell & Aviv; 4 of 6 votes	—N/a	
Voter	Episode								
Voter	1/2	3/4	5/6	7/8	9/10	11/12	13	14	15
Darrell	Danny & Evelyn	Wes & Casey	Johanna & Jesse	Tonya & Johnnie	Tina & Kenny	Wes & Casey	Tina & Kenny	Tina & Kenny	
Aviv	Danny & Evelyn	Wes & Casey	Johanna & Jesse	Tonya & Johnnie	Tina & Kenny	Wes & Casey	Tina & Kenny	Tina & Kenny	
Tina	Tonya & Johnnie	Wes & Casey	—N/a	Tonya & Johnnie	Wes & Casey	Wes & Casey	Darrell & Aviv		Darrell & Aviv; Derrick & Diem
Kenny	Tonya & Johnnie	Wes & Casey	—N/a	Tonya & Johnnie	Tina & Kenny	Wes & Casey	Darrell & Aviv		Darrell & Aviv; Derrick & Diem
Wes	Ineligible	Wes & Casey	Ineligible	Ineligible	Tina & Kenny	Tina & Kenny	Darrell & Aviv		
Casey	Ineligible	Wes & Casey	Ineligible	Ineligible	Tina & Kenny	Tina & Kenny	Darrell & Aviv		
Derrick	Danny & Evelyn	Wes & Casey	Johanna & Jesse	Tonya & Johnnie	Tina & Kenny	Shane & Linette	Theo & Chanda		
Diem	Danny & Evelyn	Wes & Casey	Johanna & Jesse	Tonya & Johnnie	Tina & Kenny	Shane & Linette	Theo & Chanda		
Theo	Tonya & Johnnie	Wes & Casey	Tina & Kenny	Wes & Casey	Tina & Kenny	Wes & Casey	Ineligible		
Chanda	Tonya & Johnnie	Wes & Casey	Tina & Kenny	Wes & Casey	Tina & Kenny	Wes & Casey	Ineligible		
Shane	Danny & Evelyn	Wes & Casey	Johanna & Jesse	Tonya & Johnnie	Katie & Eric	Ineligible			
Linette	Danny & Evelyn	Wes & Casey	Johanna & Jesse	Tonya & Johnnie	Katie & Eric	Ineligible			
Coral	Wes & Casey	Melinda & Ryan	Wes & Casey	Tina & Kenny	Tina & Kenny				
Evan	Wes & Casey	Melinda & Ryan	Wes & Casey	Tina & Kenny	Tina & Kenny				
Katie	Danny & Evelyn	Wes & Casey	Johanna & Jesse	Tonya & Johnnie	Ineligible				
Eric	Danny & Evelyn	Wes & Casey	Johanna & Jesse	Tonya & Johnnie	Ineligible				
Tonya	Danny & Evelyn	Wes & Casey	Johanna & Jesse	Tina & Kenny					
Johnnie	Danny & Evelyn	Wes & Casey	Johanna & Jesse	Tina & Kenny					
Johanna	Shane & Linette	Johanna & Jesse	—N/a						
Jesse	Shane & Linette	Johanna & Jesse	—N/a						
Melinda	Shane & Linette	Ineligible							
Ryan	Derrick & Diem	Ineligible							
Danny	Tonya & Johnnie								
Evelyn	Tonya & Johnnie								

== Episodes ==
No. overall	No. in season	Title	Original release date
156	1	"Kickin' Things Off"	May 29, 2006
157	2	"Anxieties Run High"	May 29, 2006
158	3	"Hanging Tough"	June 5, 2006
159	4	"Jailbirds"	June 12, 2006
160	5	"Climber's Paradise"	June 19, 2006
161	6	"Costume Extravaganza"	June 26, 2006
162	7	"Crossing Paths"	July 3, 2006
163	8	"Kayak Challenge"	July 10, 2006
165	9	"Kenny VS Tina?"	July 17, 2006
165	10	"Game Over?"	July 24, 2006
166	11	"Money or Friendship?"	July 31, 2006
167	12	"Jump Down Under"	August 7, 2006
168	13	"Diving In"	August 14, 2006
169	14	"Kenny & Tina's Triumph"	August 21, 2006
170	15	"The Death Roll"	August 28, 2006
171	16	"And The Winners Are..."	September 4, 2006

=== Reunion special ===
The reunion special, Well Done: The Fresh Meat Reunion, was aired on September 11, 2006, and was hosted by Susie Castillo. It was revealed on the reunion show that Casey spent her $10,000 on breast implants, and Wes said he spent his on Johanna. Kenny spent his $15,000 on a wrestling ring.

== After filming ==
In October 2011, Starkman and Santucci were named in a lawsuit filed by fellow castmember Tonya Cooley, in which Cooley claimed that she was raped with a toothbrush while passed out from heavy drinking, during filming of season 18 of The Real World/Road Rules Challenge. The case was settled out of court on October 24, 2012. The details of the settlement have not been made public. Since then, Starkman got married and welcomed his first son.

Casey Cooper and Ryan Kehoe were flown out to Argentina with the initial cast of The Challenge: All Stars to serve as alternates although both were sent home after not being used. Both Cooper and Kehoe were ultimately cast on the second season of The Challenge: All Stars. Shortly after her appearance on the reality competition series, Cooper announced her pregnancy, and married husband Kyle Toups on December 7, 2021.

=== Death of Diem Brown ===
During the filming of Fresh Meat, Diem Brown revealed to her partner Derrick Kosinski and Aviv Melmed that she was diagnosed with ovarian cancer. During the Fresh Meat reunion show in 2006, MTV donated $5,000 to her then-charity organization liveforthechallenge. In June 2012, after six years of remission, she announced that she was diagnosed with cancer for a second time. Shortly after successful completion of chemotherapy in February 2013, she competed in The Challenge: Rivals II. One year later, while filming The Challenge: Battle of the Exes II in Panama, she collapsed on set and was air-lifted to a New York-area hospital, where she was subsequently diagnosed with cancer for a third time, though she kept it hidden for two months prior to filming. Brown died on November 14, 2014, at the age of 34.

=== Subsequent seasons of The Challenge ===
Cast member	Subsequent seasons of The Challenge	Other appearances
Aviv Melmed	Battle of the Eras, Vets & New Threats	—N/a
Casey Cooper	The Duel, The Gauntlet III, The Ruins	The Challenge: All Stars (season 2)
Chanda Sneed	—N/a	—N/a
Diem Brown	The Duel, The Gauntlet III, The Duel II, The Ruins, Battle of the Exes, Rivals II, Battle of the Exes II	—N/a
Eric Banks	The Duel, The Gauntlet III, The Duel II, Cutthroat (2010), Battle of the Seasons (2012)	The Challenge: All Stars (season 1)
Evan Starkman	The Duel, The Gauntlet III, The Duel II, The Ruins, Rivals	—N/a
Evelyn Smith	The Inferno 3, The Gauntlet III, The Island, The Ruins, Fresh Meat II, Rivals	Spring Break Challenge
Jesse Stark	—N/a	—N/a
Johnnie McBride	—N/a	—N/a
Kenny Santucci	The Duel, The Inferno 3, The Gauntlet III, The Island, The Ruins, Fresh Meat II, Rivals	Spring Break Challenge
Linette Gallo	—N/a	—N/a
Ryan Kehoe	The Gauntlet III, The Island, The Duel II, Fresh Meat II, Battle of the Eras	The Challenge: All Stars (season 2), The Challenge: All Stars (season 4)

Note: Evan appeared as a color commentator on Spring Break Challenge
