= Cara Zavaleta =

American model and actress (born 1980)

Playboy centerfold appearance
- November 2004
- Preceded by: Kimberly Holland
- Succeeded by: Tiffany Fallon

Personal details
- Born: June 15, 1980 (age 46) Bowling Green, Ohio, U.S.
- Height: 5 ft 6 in (1.68 m)

Cara Zavaleta (born June 15, 1980) is an American model, actress and television personality known for her appearances on the MTV reality series Road Rules: South Pacific, and as the November 2004 Playboy Playmate.

== Reality television career ==
Zavaleta was a cast member of MTV's reality show Road Rules during the Road Rules: South Pacific season. During the season, she was voted off by her team and replaced by Tina Barta.

Zavaleta was originally cast as part of the alumni team in 2007 Road Rules 2007: Viewers' Revenge, but dropped out before filming began. She was replaced by Susie Meister. She has also participated on several of Real World/Road Rules Challenges including Real World/Road Rules Challenge: The Gauntlet, which she won, Real World/Road Rules Challenge: The Gauntlet 2, and Real World/Road Rules Challenge: The Inferno III.

== Playboy ==
After her stint on Road Rules, she posed for Playboy, becoming the Playboy Playmate for November 2004, after calling them to ask if they were interested in her.

== Personal life ==
On December 23, 2010, Zavaleta announced on her official YouTube page that she and her boyfriend were expecting their first child together, a boy due at the end of March 2011. To be closer to her immediate family, Cara moved back to Chicago in the Fall of 2010.

== Filmography ==
Film
Year	Film	Role	Notes
2005	Playboy Videos: Playmate Calendar 2006	Herself / Miss November	Playboy Videos
Television
Year	Title	Role	Notes
2003	Road Rules: South Pacific	Herself	MTV Reality TV
2003	Real World/Road Rules Challenge: The Gauntlet	Herself/Winner	MTV Reality TV
2005	Real World/Road Rules Challenge: The Gauntlet 2	Herself	MTV Reality TV
2007	Real World/Road Rules Challenge: The Inferno III	Herself	MTV Reality TV
2007–2008	The Girls Next Door	Herself	Episodes: "P.M.O. Why Not?" and "Girl Crazy: Part 1"
2009	Bridget's Sexiest Beaches	Herself	Episodes: "Thailand", "Southern California", and "Best of Bridget's Sexiest Beaches"
2010	Playboy Shootout	Herself	Playboy TV reality show
2010	Get Out!	Herself	Host (Seasons 12 and 13)

Colleen Shannon	Aliya Wolf	Sandra Hubby	Krista Kelly	Nicole Whitehead	Hiromi Oshima
Stephanie Glasson	Pilar Lastra	Scarlett Keegan	Kimberly Holland	Cara Zavaleta	Tiffany Fallon
