= Real World/Road Rules Challenge: The Inferno 3 =

14th season of the reality television series

Coordinates: 34°06′56.6″S 18°56′53.2″E

The Inferno 3
- Season 14
- Presented by: T. J. Lavin
- No. of contestants: 21
- Winners: Abram Boise; Derrick Kosinski; Evelyn Smith; Janelle Casanave; Kenny Santucci; Tonya Cooley
- Location: Cape Town, South Africa
- No. of episodes: 17 (including the "Top 10 Moments" special)

Release
- Original network: MTV
- Original release: April 10 – July 3, 2007

Season chronology
- ← Previous; The Duel Next → The Gauntlet III

Real World/Road Rules Challenge: The Inferno 3 is the 14th season of the MTV reality game show, The Challenge (at the time known as Real World/Road Rules Challenge).

The Inferno 3 marked the show's first trilogy, continuing on from The Inferno and The Inferno II. Filming took place in Cape Town, South Africa, with cast members from The Real World, Road Rules and Real World/Road Rules Challenge: Fresh Meat competing. The teams were in the format of The Inferno II, "Good Guys" versus "Bad Asses." Contrary to the previous Inferno shows, the Lifesaver competitions have been limited to gender-only winners. The season premiered on Tuesday April 10, 2007 on MTV.

There were $400,000 in prizes.

== Format ==
The competition consists of a series of team and individual challenges (sometimes called "missions"), with an elimination challenge known as the "Inferno." At the end of each challenge, $10,000 is awarded to the winning team to be banked into the team's bank account.

Odd-numbered challenges are designated as team challenges (for the exception of Episode 15), while even-numbered challenges are designated as individual challenges. At the end of team challenges, one player from each team is nominated by the opposing team for the Inferno, depending on gender. If a gender-designated player who was nominated for the Inferno out-performs his/her respective teammates on the individual challenges, that player is awarded a Life Shield, and is required to replace himself/herself with a teammate of the same gender in the Inferno. If a player who was not nominated for the Inferno in a team challenge wins a Life Shield in the ensuing individual challenge, that player has the option as to whether or not to replace himself/herself in the Inferno with a teammate of the same gender. Each Inferno alternates between male and female.

The winning players from the Inferno rejoin their respective teams and stay in the game for a chance at a share of $150,000, coupled with the accumulated money earned from the team and individual challenges, while the losing players is eliminated from the game.

== Contestants ==
Bad Asses team
Player	Original season	Finish
Abram Boise	Road Rules: South Pacific	Winner
Derrick Kosinski (Note: Before any challenges took place, CT was disqualified from the game for punching Davis in the face. Derrick was brought in as CT's replacement.)	Road Rules: X-Treme	Winner
Evelyn Smith	Real World/Road Rules Challenge: Fresh Meat	Winner
Janelle Casanave	The Real World: Key West	Winner
Kenny Santucci	Real World/Road Rules Challenge: Fresh Meat	Winner
Tonya Cooley	The Real World: Chicago	Winner
Aneesa Ferreira	The Real World: Chicago	Episode 15
Jenn Grijalva	The Real World: Denver	Episode 12
Danny Jamieson	The Real World: Austin	Episode 6
Tyrie Ballard	The Real World: Denver	Episode 3
Chris "CT" Tamburello	The Real World: Paris	Episode 1

Good Guys team
Player	Original season	Finish
Ace Amerson	The Real World: Paris	Runner-up
Alton Williams	The Real World: Las Vegas	Runner-up
Cara Zavaleta	Road Rules: South Pacific	Runner-up
John Devenanzio	The Real World: Key West	Runner-up
Paula Meronek	The Real World: Key West	Runner-up
Susie Meister	Road Rules: Down Under	Runner-up
Davis Mallory	The Real World: Denver	Episode 14
Timmy Beggy	Road Rules: USA – The Second Adventure	Episode 10 (Note: Timmy was the first contestant to finish the "Smash House" inferno, but missed a pane of glass in the process and was thus disqualified. Abram was declared the winner by default.)
Colie Edison	The Real World: Denver	Episode 8
Rachel Moyal	The Real World: Austin	Episode 4

== Gameplay ==
=== Challenge games ===
- Unbraided: Players from each team are tangled together from multiple ropes hanging from a platform 30 feet above the water. After grabbing a team flag, each player must untangle themselves and maneuver their way around their teammates before detaching from a harness that will drop them into the water. A team is disqualified if even one player is detached from their harness before untangling themselves. The team that properly untangles their entire team in the fastest time wins.
  - Winners: Bad Asses
- Ladder Race: Players from each team have to race a ladder up and down a two-story, 40-foot tower as fast as possible. First, each player will race 20 yards to the base of the tower, then use the ladder to climb to the second story, and raise their ladder to the stop of their designated towers in order to climb to the top. Next, each player will use their ladder as a "bridge" to advance from one tower to another, then race back down an adjacent tower by using their ladder to downclimb to the second story, and finally back to ground level, then race back 20 yards to the beginning of the course. One player at a time races against a player from the opposite team – guys vs. guys and girls vs. girls, with a 15-minute time limit. If a player drops a ladder, or falls off the ladder, a 2-minute penalty is added to the team's slowest time. The team with the fastest combined time wins.
  - Winners: Bad Asses
- Battering Ram: Each team must "ram" an oversize log through a pair of 2-ton doors at the Castle of Good Hope that are locked with wooden planks on the other side. The logs have ropes attached to them, and players have to position themselves to where they can swing their log through the doors with the ropes, but without touching the logs. After "ramming" through the doors, the first team to retrieve their team flag wins.
  - Winners: Good Guys
- Wrap and Roll: A 50-foot platform is suspended 1,000 feet above the ground. Played in male/female pairs, the girls from each team have to advance from one of the platform to the middle, where their male partner will be standing. A 20-foot rope is attached to each partner, and the girls have to wrap themselves in the rope in order to advance toward their male partner, then the guys have to twirl around to the other end of the platform, and the process will repeat until each partner has advanced to the opposite end. Players are disqualified if they touch the rope with their hands, their rope makes contact with the platform or they exceed a 10-minute time limit. The team that completes the challenge in the fastest average time wins. Note: Since the Bad Asses team was short one male player, Derrick had to compete twice.
  - Winners: Good Guys
- Rope Burn: A rope is attached from a fire pit to a platform suspended 15 feet above water. Below the platform are fire-building materials resting on a pair of docks, including oil, batteries, matches, logs and bales of hay. Six players from each team have to swim from the shore to the docks, and retrieve the fire-building materials over their heads without getting them wet, while the remaining three players from each team will try to sabotage their opponents by dumping buckets of water from the top of their platforms. The goal is for the players swimming from the shore to the middle of the platform to burn the ropes attached to their opponent's platform with the fire-building materials, which will drop their opponents into the water. The first team to drop their opponents into the lake wins.
  - Winners: Good Guys
- Reversible Climbing Wall: Played in male/female pairs, each team must scale up a 40-foot climbing wall, retrieve their team flag, then climb back down the wall to ground level. One player will be positioned on both sides of the wall, and will have to communicate with their partner by inserting pegs through holes in the wall in order for their partner to climb to the top and retrieve a flag. After the flag is retrieved, that player will pass the flag over the wall to their partner, who will have to scale down the wall, with their partner inserting pegs through the holes. A pair is disqualified if they fall off the wall, or drop their team flag. The team with the fastest accumulated time wins. Note: One girl from the Bad Asses team (Aneesa) sat out this challenge, while one girl from the Good Guys team (Colie) had to compete twice.
  - Winners: Bad Asses
- Grape Smash: Players from each team have to fill up a series of team-designated glass bottles with grape juice on one side of a course, by transferring handfuls of grapes from the bed of a classic truck to a wine tub, then smashing the grapes, which will send juice through a spigot, where players have to transfer the juice with their mouths to the glass bottles. The team that transfers the most juice into their designated bottles within 30 minutes wins. Note: Host T. J. Lavin explained to each team that each player was required to wear speedos and bikinis, resulting in Ace, Alton and Timmy refusing to participate.
  - Winners: Bad Asses
- Steady As You Go: Teams have to build walkways, by using three 8-foot logs for the girls on each team to advance from one platform to another that is separated by 60 feet. If a player falls off the logs, or uses their safety harness to catch their fall, a 15-minute disqualification will be added to their team time. The team that advances their girls from one platform to the other in the fastest average time wins.
  - Winners: Good Guys
- Leaps and Bounds: Players have to advance on a series of five platforms, with trampolines located in between. Each platform decreases in size as each team tries to advance to the end. To start, one player at a time will jump from a trampoline to a platform, without their hands or arms coming in contact with the platform, which would result in a player having to start over. Once players from a team have made their way to the final platform, their team time will stop when they hold their pose for three seconds. The team that advances o the last platform in the fastest time wins. Note: Aneesa was prohibited from participating in this challenge due to a knee injury. As a result, the Good Guys were forced to sit out one player (Paula) in order to even out the teams.
  - Winners: Bad Asses
- Dog Day Afternoon: Teams compete in a 50-yard dash, using dog sleds. The challenge is played in male/female pairs, with each pair dragging sleds with a male/female pair from the opposite team sitting on the sleds. The team that completes the challenge in the fastest average time wins. Note: Two girls from the Good Guys team (Paula and Susie) were required to compete twice, while two girls from the Bad Asses team (Aneesa and Jenn) were forced to sit out the challenge.
  - Winners: Bad Asses
- Hand Car: Teams have to race on a 300-yard railroad track on a "hand car." To start, two players per team will pump their hand car from one end of the track to the other and pick one teammate, then race back to the opposite end of the tracks and pick up another teammate, and the process will continue, until each team picks up all of their teammates, and reaches the stop zone. A hand car must come to a complete stop within the stopping zone before a teammate can climb into the hand car, and each player is required to pump the hand car least once throughout the challenge. The first team to pick up all of their teammates and reach the stop zone wins. Note: Since the Bad Asses had one more player than the Good Guys, one player from the Bad Asses team (Jenn) sat out this challenge.
  - Winners: Good Guys
- Giraffic Park: Players from each team have to transfer hand-carved wooden giraffes across a lake, to one of 15 cages that contains an identical twin giraffe. There are numerous giraffes on the shore across the lake that are in different shapes and sizes, and before advancing across the lake, each player has to randomly uncover one of 15 cages at the start of the course that are covered with white tarps, then memorize the details of the caged wood-carved giraffe inside, then swim across the lake to find the identical matching twin, with a key that will unlock a player's designated cage at the start of the course. Each player will have a 30-minute time limit, and the team that completes the challenge in the fastest average time wins.
  - Winners: Good Guys
- Captain's Chair: Players from each team are asked a series of ten trivia questions regarding information related to the Inferno 3 challenge. One girl from each team is designated by the opposing team as the "Captain," and will be strapped into an African throne, and be connected to designated electric shock boxes. T. J. Lavin will ask the remaining players from each team trivia questions. Each player will write down an answer on an oversize card, and if a player is correct, he/she accumulates points for their team, but if an answer is wrong, the captain will get "zapped." The team that accumulates the most points wins, and a team wins if the captain from the opposing team decide that she can no longer handle the shocks.
  - Winners: Bad Asses
- Hook Me: The male players on each team are positioned on opposite fishing boats, with each boat containing a deep-sea fishing pole. One girl per team will be in the water, attached to the ends of the fishing poles. Each girl will have 30 seconds to swim as far away as possible from the boats, then T. J. Lavin will signal one guy from each team to pick up the fishing poles, and try to reel in their female teammate out of the water. The process continues, until the team whose male players reel in all of their female teammates out of the water in the fastest average time wins.
  - Winners: Bad Asses
- Nothin' But Net: Players from each team have to climb up a cargo net that is hanging from a platform above water, retrieve one team flag, then unhook a rope in order to swing themselves toward another cargo net and retrieve another flag. The process continues until a player retrieves four flags. If a player falls off the rope or the net into water, he/she will be imposed a time of 15 minutes. Each player will have a 15-minute time limit to retrieve four flags, and the team that completes the challenge in the fastest average time wins. Note: Tonya received a medical exemption from this challenge due to dehydration, and did not participate.
  - Winners: Bad Asses

=== Inferno games ===
- Head Rush: The men hang upside down by their ankles and must swing around collecting puzzle pieces. They must then construct the puzzle correctly.
  - Played by: Alton vs. Tyrie
- Ejection: Both opponents must use jousting sticks to hit each other's targets—which in turn causes their opponent's platform to tilt 15 degrees each time the target is hit, until the opponent falls off. The first person to knock their opponent off three times wins.
  - Played by: Rachel vs. Jenn
- Watch Your Back: A game of tag that takes place on a platform with four ladders. Davis starts on top of the platform and Danny starts on the floor. When T. J. Lavin blows the whistle, they have to chase each other until one of them either tags or passes the other. The first person to score twice wins and the loser will be sent packing.
  - Played by: Davis vs. Danny
- Spokesmodel: Jenn and Colie climb to the top of a giant wheel; once T. J. sounds his air horn the wheel begins to spin, the longer the two girls remain on the wheel, the faster it will spin. The girl that remains on the wheel for the longest amount of time will be the winner.
  - Played by: Colie vs. Jenn
- Smash House: In this Inferno both contestants are given a metal ring and placed in a three glass boxes, each one smaller than the next, that are suspended in mid air. After the start is announced, both contestants must race against each other in order to break all of the different panes of glass, the contestant who can achieve this fastest is the winner. Following the Inferno, Timmy announced that he would be retiring from the challenges, saying that he is passing the torch. A montage of Timmy's time on "Road Rules 2" and several challenges was shown.
  - Played by: Timmy vs. Abram
- Zero Gravity: Both girls are put into harnesses that are attached to seventy-five-percent of their weight, making it very easy to climb the ladder, but very difficult to come down. At the top of the ladder there are eight flags; the first team member to get four of the eight flags attached at the bottom of the ladder is the winner.
  - Played by: Susie vs. Jenn
- Corner Ball: Each person stood on opposite sides of a wall that was 9 feet long and in a triangle with a rugby ball in between them. Once T. J. says go, they both go for the ball and try to get the ball to the other person's side of the wall. The first person to get 3 of the rugby balls to the other person's side is the winner.
  - Played by: Davis vs. Derrick
- Shimmy: The opponents must shimmy up between walls, ripping off team flags along the way. The first one to rip off the flag at the top of the walls wins.
  - Played by: Paula vs. Aneesa

=== The final challenge ===
The final challenge revolved around the idea of "The Big Five", which is a reference to the top five animals for hunting in the region. Contestant had to carry square tile puzzle pieces throughout the entire mission, accumulating more pieces along the way to complete bigger puzzles, each being a picture of an animal. The first puzzle is that of a water buffalo, after which each team has to swim across a lake with their puzzle pieces, before reaching the second puzzle station, which is a leopard. After the leopard puzzle station, each team must retrieve puzzle pieces by digging through a pit with a gurney at the bottom that will aid in each team carrying their respective puzzle pieces, before reaching the rhino puzzle station. The fourth puzzle station is that of an elephant. The remaining puzzle pieces for the final checkpoint — a lion puzzle station — are hanging overhead in a net, and players from each team must stay within a designated safe zone in order to untie the knots, which will release the pieces. After each team solves their final puzzle, they will no longer be required to carry any puzzle pieces to the finish line.

In the end, the Bad Asses emerged victorious, winning an additional $150,000 on top of the $90,000 that they earned in the previous missions, for a grand total of $240,000, while the Good Guys earned $60,000.

== Game summary ==
Episode		Gender	Winner	Life Shield		Inferno contestants		Inferno game	Inferno outcome	
#	Challenge	Gender	Winner	Good Guys	Bad Asses	Good Guys	Bad Asses	Inferno game	Winner	Eliminated
1	Unbraided	Male	Bad Asses			Davis	Abram			
2/3	Ladder Race	Male	Bad Asses	Alton	Abram	Alton	Tyrie	Head Rush	Alton	Tyrie
3	Battering Ram	Female	Good Guys			Susie	Jenn			
4	Wrap and Roll	Female	Good Guys	Susie	—N/a (Note: For the "Wrap and Roll" challenge, the Life Shield was only awarded Susie since no other pairs were able to complete the challenge.)	Rachel		Ejection	Jenn	Rachel
5	Rope Burn	Male	Good Guys			Davis	Danny			
6	Reversible Climbing Wall	Male	Bad Asses	John	Abram			Watch Your Back	Davis	Danny
7	Grape Smash	Female	Bad Asses			Susie	Jenn			
8	Steady As You Go	Female	Good Guys	Susie	Tonya	Colie		Spokesmodel	Jenn	Colie
9	Leaps and Bounds	Male	Bad Asses			Ace	Kenny			
10	Dog Day Afternoon	Male	Bad Asses	Ace	Kenny	Timmy	Abram	Smash House	Abram	Timmy
11	Hand Car	Female	Good Guys			Susie	Jenn			
12	Giraffic Park	Female	Good Guys	Paula	Janelle			Zero Gravity	Susie	Jenn
13 (Note: Following the "Captain's Chair" challenge in Episode 13, the players voted both male and female Inferno nominees. The male Inferno elimination was held after the "Hook Me" challenge and the female Inferno elimination was held after the "Nothin' But Net" challenge.)	Captain's Chair	—N/a	Bad Asses			Davis	Derrick			
13	Captain's Chair	—N/a	Bad Asses			Susie	Aneesa			
14	Hook Me	Male	Bad Asses	John	Kenny			Corner Ball	Derrick	Davis
15	Nothin' But Net	Female	Bad Asses	Susie	Evelyn	Paula		Shimmy	Paula	Aneesa
16	The Big Five	—N/a	Bad Asses							

=== Elimination progress ===
Contestants	Episode															
Contestants	1	2/3	3	4	5	6	7	8	9	10	11	12	13	14	15	Finale
Abram	NOM	WIN	SAFE	SAFE	SAFE	WON	SAFE	SAFE	SAFE	ELIM	SAFE	SAFE	SAFE	SAFE	SAFE	WINNER
Derrick	SAFE	SAFE	SAFE	SAFE	SAFE	SAFE	SAFE	SAFE	SAFE	SAFE	SAFE	SAFE	NOM	ELIM	SAFE	WINNER
Evelyn	SAFE	SAFE	SAFE	SAFE	SAFE	SAFE	SAFE	SAFE	SAFE	SAFE	SAFE	SAFE	SAFE	SAFE	WON	WINNER
Janelle	SAFE	SAFE	SAFE	SAFE	SAFE	SAFE	SAFE	SAFE	SAFE	SAFE	SAFE	WON	SAFE	SAFE	SAFE	WINNER
Kenny	SAFE	SAFE	SAFE	SAFE	SAFE	SAFE	SAFE	SAFE	NOM	WIN	SAFE	SAFE	SAFE	WON	SAFE	WINNER
Tonya	SAFE	SAFE	SAFE	SAFE	SAFE	SAFE	SAFE	WON	SAFE	SAFE	SAFE	SAFE	SAFE	SAFE	SAFE	WINNER
Ace	SAFE	SAFE	SAFE	SAFE	SAFE	SAFE	SAFE	SAFE	NOM	WIN	SAFE	SAFE	SAFE	SAFE	SAFE	LOSER
Alton	SAFE	VOL	SAFE	SAFE	SAFE	SAFE	SAFE	SAFE	SAFE	SAFE	SAFE	SAFE	SAFE	SAFE	SAFE	LOSER
Cara	SAFE	SAFE	SAFE	SAFE	SAFE	SAFE	SAFE	SAFE	SAFE	SAFE	SAFE	SAFE	SAFE	SAFE	SAFE	LOSER
John	SAFE	SAFE	SAFE	SAFE	SAFE	WON	SAFE	SAFE	SAFE	SAFE	SAFE	SAFE	SAFE	WON	SAFE	LOSER
Paula	SAFE	SAFE	SAFE	SAFE	SAFE	SAFE	SAFE	SAFE	SAFE	SAFE	SAFE	WON	SAFE	SAFE	ELIM	LOSER
Susie	SAFE	SAFE	NOM	WIN	SAFE	SAFE	NOM	WIN	SAFE	SAFE	NOM	ELIM	NOM	SAFE	WIN	LOSER
Aneesa	SAFE	SAFE	SAFE	SAFE	SAFE	SAFE	SAFE	SAFE	SAFE	SAFE	SAFE	SAFE	NOM	SAFE	OUT	
Davis	NOM	SAVE	SAFE	SAFE	NOM	ELIM	SAFE	SAFE	SAFE	SAFE	SAFE	SAFE	NOM	OUT		
Jenn	SAFE	SAFE	NOM	ELIM	SAFE	SAFE	NOM	ELIM	SAFE	SAFE	SAFE	OUT				
Timmy	SAFE	SAFE	SAFE	SAFE	SAFE	SAFE	SAFE	SAFE	SAFE	DQ						
Colie	SAFE	SAFE	SAFE	SAFE	SAFE	SAFE	SAFE	OUT								
Danny	SAFE	SAFE	SAFE	SAFE	NOM	OUT										
Rachel	SAFE	SAFE	SAFE	OUT												
Tyrie	SAFE	OUT														
CT	DQ															

Teams
The contestant is on the Bad Asses team
The contestant is on the Good Guys team
Competition
The contestant won the final challenge
The contestant lost the final challenge
The contestant won the Life Shield and saved themselves
The contestant won the Life Shield but did not use it
The contestant was safe from the Inferno
The contestant was selected to go into the Inferno
The contestant was saved by the Life Shield winner
The contestant was selected to go into the Inferno and won
The contestant won the Life Shield, went into the Inferno and won
The contestant lost in the Inferno and was eliminated
The contestant was disqualified from the competition

== Partners ==
Wrap and Roll (Ep. 4)
Derrick & Evelyn
Davis & Rachel
Abram & Janelle
Ace & Colie
Kenny & Aneesa
John & Paula
Danny & Tonya
Timmy & Cara
Derrick & Jenn
Alton & Susie

Reversible Climbing Wall (Ep. 6)
Alton & Colie	Abram & Tonya
Timmy & Susie	Derrick & Janelle
Ace & Cara	Kenny & Jenn
John & Paula	Danny & Evelyn
Davis & Colie	

Dog Day Afternoon (Ep. 10)
Davis & Susie	Derrick & Tonya
John & Paula	Abram & Janelle
Ace & Cara	Kenny & Evelyn
Alton & Paula	
Timmy & Susie	

== Episodes ==
No. overall	No. in season	Title	Original release date
188	1	"Welcome to Africa"	April 10, 2007
189	2	"Welcome to Africa"	April 10, 2007
190	3	"The Good Guys Strike Back!"	April 17, 2007
191	4	"Playing The Game"	April 24, 2007
192	5	"Kicking Ace"	May 1, 2007
193	6	"Off The Wall"	May 8, 2007
194	7	"Sour Grapes"	May 8, 2007
195	8	"Walk This Way"	May 15, 2007
196	9	"Bouncing Back"	May 15, 2007
197	10	"Pane In The Glass"	May 22, 2007
198	11	"Workin' On The Railroad"	May 29, 2007
199	12	"Match Point"	June 5, 2007
200	13	"High Voltage"	June 12, 2007
201	14	"Hook The Man"	June 19, 2007
202	15	"Team Girl Squad"	June 26, 2007
203	16	"The Big Five"	July 3, 2007

=== Top 10 moments ===
Instead of a Reunion special, which has aired at the end of each season, excluding the Inferno II, a Top 10 Moments special aired on July 10, 2007. All members who participated in the Final Challenge participated in the special.
