= Road Rules: South Pacific =

- Season 12
- Starring: Abram Boise; Cara Zavaleta; Christena Pyle; Dave Giuntoli; Donell Langham; Mary Beth Decker; Chris Graebe; Tina Barta; Jeremy Blossom
- No. of episodes: 18 (including one special)

Release
- Original network: MTV
- Original release: May 19 – September 15, 2003

Season chronology
- ← Previous; Road Rules: Campus Crawl Next → Road Rules: X-Treme

Road Rules: South Pacific is the twelfth season of the MTV reality television series Road Rules. Taking place in the South Pacific, it was filmed during February and March 2003. A casting special aired on May 19, 2003, and the season premiered one week later on May 26, 2003. This season's working title was Road Rules: South Seas, as heard in their first episode when the cast read their welcome letters.

== Cast ==
Cast member	Age^{1}	Hometown
Abram Boise	20	Bozeman, MT
Cara Zavaleta	22	Bowling Green, OH
Christena Pyle	20	Tampa, FL
Dave Giuntoli	22	St. Louis, MO
Donell Langham	20	Boston, MA
Mary Beth Decker	22	Houston, TX
Chris Graebe	22	Ellettsville, IN
Tina Barta	21	Lincoln, NE
Jeremy Blossom	19	Parma Heights, OH

- ^Note 1: At time of filming.

=== Duration of cast ===
Cast member	Episodes																
Cast member	1	2	3	4	5	6	7	8	9	10	11	12	13	14	15	16	17
Christena	FEAT	FEAT	FEAT	FEAT	FEAT	FEAT	FEAT	FEAT	FEAT	FEAT	FEAT	FEAT	FEAT	FEAT	FEAT	FEAT	FEAT
Dave	FEAT	FEAT	FEAT	FEAT	FEAT	FEAT	FEAT	FEAT	FEAT	FEAT	FEAT	FEAT	FEAT	FEAT	FEAT	FEAT	FEAT
Mary Beth	FEAT	FEAT	FEAT	FEAT	FEAT	FEAT	FEAT	FEAT	FEAT	FEAT	FEAT	FEAT	FEAT	FEAT	FEAT	FEAT	FEAT
Chris							REP. (Note: Chris replaced Abram in Episode 7)	FEAT	FEAT	FEAT	FEAT	FEAT	FEAT	FEAT	FEAT	FEAT	FEAT
Tina										REP. (Note: Tina replaced Cara in Episode 10)	FEAT	FEAT	FEAT	FEAT	FEAT	FEAT	FEAT
Jeremy													REP. (Note: Jeremy replaced Donell in Episode 13)	FEAT	FEAT	FEAT	FEAT
Donell	FEAT	FEAT	FEAT	FEAT	FEAT	FEAT	FEAT	FEAT	FEAT	FEAT	FEAT	FEAT	VOTE (Note: Donell was voted out in Episode 13 as a punishment for losing a mission)				
Cara	FEAT	FEAT	FEAT	FEAT	FEAT	FEAT	FEAT	FEAT	FEAT	VOTE (Note: Cara was voted out in Episode 10 as a punishment for losing a mission)							
Abram	FEAT	FEAT	FEAT	FEAT	FEAT	FEAT	REM. (Note: Abram was removed from the show in Episode 7 after physically attacking Donell)										

Table key
FEAT = Cast member is featured on this episode
REP. = Cast member replaces another cast member
VOTE = Cast member is voted out of the show
REM. = Cast member is removed from the show

== Missions ==
#	Challenge	Result	Notes
1	Around the World	Completed	
2	Buried Alive	Completed	
3	Strong Man Competition	Completed	
4	Search for the Cure	Completed	
5	Family Feud	Completed	
6	Climb to Jump	Completed	
7	Strip Tease	Completed	Abram removed from show for physical violence; Chris replaces him.
8	Catche Me If You Can	Failed	
9	Rock Diving	Completed	
10	Glacier Climb	Failed	Cara voted out; Tina replaces her.
11	Little House on the Prairie	Completed	
12	Sensory Race	Completed	
13	Put the Skills to the Test	Failed	Donell voted out; Jeremy replaces him.
14	Face Off	Failed	Beat by Road Rules: Campus Crawl
15	Trust Me	Completed	
16	Grab the Keys	Completed	

== Episodes ==
No. overall	No. in season	Title	Original release date
172	1	"Around the World"	May 26, 2003
173	2	"Buried Alive"	June 2, 2003
174	3	"Only the Strong Survive"	June 9, 2003
175	4	"Search for the Cure"	June 16, 2003
176	5	"Climb to Jump"	June 23, 2003
177	6	"Family Feud; Roadies Style"	June 30, 2003
178	7	"Strip Tease"	July 7, 2003
179	8	"Catch Me If you Can"	July 14, 2003
180	9	"Rock Diving"	July 21, 2003
181	10	"Glacier Climb"	July 28, 2003
182	11	"Little House on the Prairie"	August 4, 2003
183	12	"Sensory Race"	August 11, 2003
184	13	"Put the Skills to the Test"	August 18, 2003
185	14	"Face Off"	August 25, 2003
186	15	"Face Off (2)"	September 1, 2003
187	16	"Fire Walk"	September 8, 2003
188	17	"Handsome Reward"	September 15, 2003

== After filming ==
The entire cast of this season was trained in public speaking by American University's Department of Communications.

Cara Zavaleta was named Playmate of the Month for November 2004 after the show had already aired.

In 2005, Chris Graebe and his wife Jenni welcomed their son, Kaden Christopher.

In 2007, Mary Beth Decker welcomed her first son, Gavin.

David Giuntoli has become an actor. He's best known for playing Detective Nick Burkhardt in the TV series Grimm. In 2017, he married Grimm his co-star Bitsie Tulloch. Their first daughter, Vivian, was born on February 14, 2019.

Jeremy Blossom is the co-founder and CEO of Strikepoint Media, he is married and has two kids.

Abram returned to the series as part of the alumni cast of Road Rules 2007: Viewers' Revenge. After dating fellow Challenge cast member Cara Maria Sorbello, Boise proposed to Rachel Missie in 2019. The couple married in Montana on June 1, 2019. In 2020, Boise and Missie announced they were expecting their first child. Their son, Atlas Young Boise, was born on April 22, 2021. The couple separated shortly after.

=== The Challenge ===
Cast member	Seasons of The Challenge	Other appearances
Abram Boise	The Gauntlet, The Inferno, Battle of the Sexes 2, The Inferno II, The Inferno 3, The Island, Cutthroat (2010), Battle of the Exes, Battle of the Bloodlines	—N/a
Cara Zavaleta	The Gauntlet, The Gauntlet 2, The Inferno 3	—N/a
Christena Pyle	The Inferno	—N/a
Dave Giuntoli	The Gauntlet	—N/a
Donell Langham	—N/a	—N/a
Mary Beth Decker	—N/a	—N/a
Chris Graebe	Battle of the Sexes 2	—N/a
Tina Barta	The Gauntlet, Battle of the Sexes 2, The Inferno II, Fresh Meat, The Duel, Battle of the Eras	The Challenge: All Stars (season 2), The Challenge: All Stars (season 3), The Challenge: All Stars (season 4)
Jeremy Blossom	The Inferno, The Gauntlet 2	—N/a

Note: Tina appeared on Cutthroat (2010) for an elimination
