= Real World/Road Rules Challenge: The Duel =

13th season of the reality television series

Coordinates: 22°46′27.2″S 41°52′51.5″W

The Duel
- Season 13
- Presented by: T. J. Lavin
- No. of contestants: 20
- Winners: Wes Bergmann; Jodi Weatherton
- Location: Armação dos Búzios, Brazil
- No. of episodes: 17

Release
- Original network: MTV
- Original release: October 12, 2006 – January 18, 2007

Season chronology
- ← Previous; Fresh Meat Next → The Inferno 3

Real World/Road Rules Challenge: The Duel is the 13th season of the MTV reality game show, The Challenge (at the time known as Real World/Road Rules Challenge). This is the first edition of The Duel series, with The Duel II following in 2009.

The Duel took place in Búzios, Brazil, with cast members from The Real World, Road Rules and Real World/Road Rules Challenge: Fresh Meat. The Duel was the first individual season, with no assigned teams. The winning male and female cast member would win $150,000 each. The season was watched by a total of 83 million viewers. The Duel premiered on October 12, 2006, and concluded on January 18, 2007.

On December 15, 2020, the season was made available to stream on Netflix in the United States.

== Format ==
Each player participates in numerous challenges (sometimes called "missions"), which are followed by an elimination round — "The Duel". The challenges can involve either members of the same gender competing against each other, or groups of both men and women competing against each other. Each challenge has a male and a female winner, and is alternatively designated as either a male or a female Duel day. The winner of the gender not entering the Duel is awarded a prize, while the winner of the gender designated for the Duel is safe from the possibility of having to enter the Duel.

The immunity winner begins the Nomination process by picking a member of the opposite gender, who then selects a member of the original gender. This process continues until there is one person remaining of the selected Duel gender of the day; this remaining person is nominated to compete in the Duel that evening. The selected player then challenges a player of the same gender to go against him/her that night, for the exception of that day's daily challenge winner and randomly selects from one of four cards held by the host T. J. Lavin to determine the Duel game in which the two players will compete. Note that this selection process occurs immediately after the challenge, unlike in other Challenges, where there is a period of deliberation between the end of the challenge and the selection of the contestants for the elimination game.

The loser of the Duel is eliminated from the game and is sent home.

At the end of the season, four contestants are left — two of each gender. For each gender, the first-place finishers each win $150,000.

== Contestants ==
Male contestants	Original season	Finish
Wes Bergmann	The Real World: Austin	Winner
Brad Fiorenza	The Real World: San Diego	Runner-up
Chris "CT" Tamburello	The Real World: Paris	Episode 15 (Note: Beth and CT were disqualified from their respective "Push Me" Duels, after improperly unhooking the flag from the carabiner.)
Evan Starkman	Real World/Road Rules Challenge: Fresh Meat	Episode 13
Eric Banks	Real World/Road Rules Challenge: Fresh Meat	Episode 11
Derrick Kosinski	Road Rules: X-Treme	Episode 9
Nehemiah Clark	The Real World: Austin	Episode 7
Kenny Santucci	Real World/Road Rules Challenge: Fresh Meat	Episode 5
Tyler Duckworth	The Real World: Key West	Episode 3
John Devenanzio	The Real World: Key West	Episode 2

Female contestants	Original season	Finish
Jodi Weatherton	Road Rules: X-Treme	Winner
Svetlana Shusterman	The Real World: Key West	Runner-up
Aneesa Ferreira	The Real World: Chicago	Episode 15
Diem Brown	Real World/Road Rules Challenge: Fresh Meat	Episode 14
Kina Dean	Road Rules: X-Treme	Episode 12
Robin Hibbard	The Real World: San Diego	Episode 10
Beth Stolarczyk	The Real World: Los Angeles	Episode 8
Casey Cooper	Real World/Road Rules Challenge: Fresh Meat	Episode 6
Paula Meronek	The Real World: Key West	Episode 4
Tina Barta	Road Rules: South Pacific	Episode 3 (Note: No female Duel was held in Episode 2, after Tina was disqualified from the competition following the "Ring Toss" challenge for punching Beth.)

== Gameplay ==
=== Challenge games ===
- Reaching Out: Ten ropes of equal length are connected to the center of a large circle in the sand. Played in separate male and female rounds, each player is padlocked to their harnesses, and have to crawl and reach out to the end of the circle, where they will dig into the sand in order to retrieve a key needed to unlock the padlock from their harness. The first player from each heat who set himself/herself free from their padlocks first wins.
  - Winners: Eric & Robin
- Ring Toss: Twenty poles are located at the ends of a waist-deep mud pit — ten different-colored poles on each side. On one side, each pole contains six rings of a particular color. Played in separate male and female rounds, each player races from one end of the mud pit to another, and grabs a ring of an opponent's color, and places the ring around an opponent's pole. The goal is to eliminate an opponent by placing six rings round an opponent's pole. The last player standing from each heat wins.
  - Winners: Kenny & Diem
- Pass With Care: A pair of platforms are suspended 20 feet above water, connected by an unstable rope bridge with crooked planks. Unlike the previous two challenge games, this challenge is played with guys and girls partnered together. Each partner starts on opposite sides of the ropes, and have to meet each other halfway through the bridge on a red plank. The catch: A team is disqualified if one player sits, kneels on, or touches any part of the bridge with their hands, or falls off the unstable bridge. Since nobody made it across the bridge on the first go-around, the challenge was repeated in a second round, in which teams were allowed to make it across the bridge by any means possible, including sitting on, crawling and kneeling on the bridge planks. The team that makes it across the bridge in the fastest time wins, with the male partner safe from Duel selection and the female partner winning a prize.
  - Winners: Evan & Jodi
- Roller Derby: Players compete in an oval "roller derby" rink, and each player has to race 10 laps around the rink, using roller skates. The challenge is played in separate rounds for each gender — two 4-player rounds for the men, and three 3-player rounds for the women. When host T. J. Lavin sounds the horn, each player races on their own, competing against opposing players, and can eliminate an opponent out of the action zones by launching their opponents over the crash pads outside the railings. If a player is knocked off the track on the inside of the course, that player has three seconds to get back on the action zone, or he/she will be disqualified. A player is also disqualified if he/she clings onto the railing. The winners of each round advance to the final round, in which the last player standing wins.
  - Winners: Brad & Jodi
- Push Over: A player has to "push" their opponent off a plank that is attached to the end of a boat, with each players' hands tied to where they cannot grab their opponent. Prior to the challenge, match-ups are determined in which T. J. Lavin asks each player to pick colored tokens out of a bag, and players with matching tokens are paired up in same-gender heats. The challenge is played in three rounds of separate male and female rounds. The first player to get pushed into the water is eliminated, and the process repeats until the last player standing wins.
  - Winners: Derrick & Beth
- Flying Leap: Two players at a time jump back and forth from one end of a platform to another that is suspended from a crane 20 feet above water, and grab as many flags as possible with a three-minute time limit, with numerous flags hanging from poles located on both sides of the platform. A player is disqualified if he/she falls into the water. The player that grabs the most flags within three minutes wins. (Note: Casey was disqualified for refusing to compete, due to her fear of heights.)
  - Winners: CT & Svetlana
- Throwback: Played in male/female teams on a Russian swing, each player has to "swing" their partner from a platform into water, then swim 50 feet toward a buoy, retrieve a soccer ball from a ring, then swim with the soccer ball to the other side of the course, and slam dunk the soccer ball into a ring on the opposite side. A pair is disqualified if the soccer ball lands outside of the course boundary. Both partners have to swing each other into the water, and the team with the fastest combined time wins, with the male partner safe from the Duel, and the female partner winning a prize.
  - Winners: Evan & Kina
- Rafty Race: This game consists of multiple checkpoints along the beach. To start, each player must race to put on large swim fins, then run to the first checkpoint. There are a total of 16 swim fins, and three players — one male and two female — will be left without any fins, eliminating them from the remainder of the race. Once each player has put their swim fins on, they race to the first checkpoint, in which they have to pull a tag that is needed to inflate rafts with air pumps and grab color-coded tags at the second checkpoint, which are green for the men and red for the women. There are a total of 10 air pumps, five for each gender, and one player of each gender will be left without an air pump, and eliminated from the race. If a player does not pull a tag, he/she is eliminated. Once the remaining players have inflated their rafts, they will race through the water toward the third checkpoint — a buoy, which contains six oars — three for each gender. For each gender, there is one fewer raft than there are players, so the players that are left without a paddle are eliminated. After grabbing the oars, each player will paddle their way to the fourth checkpoint, which contains one of four keys needed to grab a key that will unlock a treasure chest at the final checkpoint. Only two players per gender will compete for grabbing a flag from the treasure chest, with the first player of each gender racing to the end of the beach, and winning the race.
  - Winners: CT & Jodi
- Pole Dance: First, players are paired together in two teams of six players — three of each gender. The male winners of the previous challenge and duel — CT and Eric — are chosen as team captains, and alternate between choosing guys and girls for their teams. After the two teams are set, each team has to hoist players up a slippery wooden pole in order to retrieve a flag at the top. The team that grabs their flag first wins the first phase of the challenge. The winners of the first phase are split up into separate genders — three guys and three girls — each player for themselves, and the second phase is a race through a sand dune course. The remaining players have to race down a slippery tarp into water, then back up a sand dune. Near the top of the dune, there are two slippery tarps that will be difficult for each player to climb. The first players to race to the top and retrieve a designated flag win the challenge.
  - Winners: Evan & Diem
- Dine-N-Dash: First, players are paired together in two teams of 10 players — two guys and three girls. The female winners of the previous challenge and duel — Diem and Svetlana — are chosen as team captains, and alternate between choosing guys and girls for their teams. After the two teams are set, players from each team are weighed individually, and after each player's weight is combined, and each team is given 20 minutes to eat as much food as possible. The team that gains the higher amount of weight wins the first phase of the challenge. The winners of the first phase are split up into separate genders — two guys and three girls — each player for themselves. In the second phase, the remaining players have to do wind sprints toward a series of 10 poles along the beach, retrieve designated color flags — green for the guys, red for the girls — and deposit 10 flags into their designated baskets. Each player has to retrieve a flag from the first pole, and deposit the flag into their designated basket, before sprinting toward any other pole. The first players to deposit 10 flags into their designated basket win the challenge.
  - Winners: Evan & Diem
- Stacking Stairs: Played in male/female teams, each team has to create an ascending (albeit unstable) staircase by transferring wooden crates toward the base of their designated flags that are hanging from a ceiling. The challenge is played in two different rounds, with three teams competing in the first round, and two teams in the second round. (Aneesa chose which teams would compete in the first round, since she won the duel in the previous episode.) Each team debates amongst themselves as to which player will be harnessed in order to climb to the top of their "staircase," and jump up in an attempt to retrieve their flag. The team from the first round that retrieves their team flag in the fastest time wins the first phase of the challenge, and the two remaining teams in the second round have to beat the time of the winner of the first round. The male partner of the winning team is safe from the duel, while the female partner wins a prize.
  - Winners: Evan & Jodi
- Ice Breakers: Played in separate male and female rounds, each player has to race toward a pile of oversize ice blocks, retrieve one ice block at a time, then race toward their designated tables, and use a sledge hammer to smash as much ice as possible through the grates (while wearing protective goggles and gloves), in which the containers below will be filled with the smashed ice. The process continues for five minutes, after which each container is weighed at a weigh station. The player whose container weighs the most after five minutes wins.
  - Winners: Evan & Jodi
- Sunken Treasure: Played in male/female teams, and one team at a time, each partner must swim down into a deep water tank, inside an oxygen cage, where players can catch their breath. Only one partner at a time is allowed to swim further down toward an anchor that has three 4-digit codes that a player must relay back to his/her partner, and memorize the numbers that are needed to unlock three locks to a treasure chest at the bottom of the tank. Like the anchor, only one partner at a time is allowed to swim toward the treasure chest. Once all three locks to the treasure chest are unlocked, a soccer ball attached to a flag will float to the water's surface. A team is disqualified if both partners swim down toward the anchor.
  - Winners: Wes & Svetlana
- Around the Block: Played in separate male/female rounds, and two players at a time, each player has to climb up a 40-foot, rectangular-shaped truss that is suspended from a crane, and collect as many flags as possible. Sixteen flags are hanging from the vertical section of the truss, which are worth one point each, and there is one flag hanging in the middle of the horizontal truss, which is worth three and a half points. Since there is one more female player than male players, the game is played in two female rounds and a championship, and one male round and a championship. (Note: Since CT won the previous duel, he chose to have a bye in the first heat, and automatically competed in the championship.) The players that earn the most points in the initial rounds advance to their respective championships, and the players that earn the most points win the challenge.
  - Winners: CT & Jodi
- Paddle Me: Played in three male/female teams, each partner has to swim together on three 9-foot surfboards toward an island in the middle of a large harbor. When each player reaches the island, three additional surfboards are awaiting each player. Once each player has reached the island with their own surfboard, it's every man and woman for themselves, and the first man and woman to race back to the shore on their surfboard not only wins the challenge, but also an automatic bid in the final challenge, while the remaining players are automatically sent to the last duel. The second-place male and female get to choose which game will be played in the last duel elimination.
  - Winners: Wes & Jodi

=== Duel games ===
- I Can: Players bet on how many specific items they can lift in a cart, such as watermelons, logs, or coffee bags and there is a limited amount of items. Player must hold up the cart for a full 5 seconds to win.
  - Played by: Tyler vs. John, Eric vs. Nehemiah, Aneesa vs. Diem, Svetlana vs. Aneesa
- Ascender: Players must climb a rope, pull another rope to release a basket containing puzzle pieces, and climb back down the rope to assemble a tiling puzzle similar to a tangram.
  - Played by: Derrick vs. Tyler, Nehemiah vs. Kenny, Aneesa vs. Robin, CT vs. Evan
- Pole Wrestle: Players are placed at the center of a circle and are asked to place both hands on a wooden pole approximately 2 feet (0.61 m) in length. The first contestant to wrestle the pole out of his or her opponent's hands wins the Duel. If the players go out of bounds, they must restart the match.
  - Played by: Aneesa vs. Paula, Robin vs. Casey, Wes vs. Derrick, Brad vs. Eric
- Push Me: This Duel features a pole several yards long, fixed to the ground in the center. A flag is attached by a carabiner to the ground a few yards in front of the pole. Players stand on opposite ends of the pole on the side away from the flag. Each player pushes the pole toward the flag; since the pole is fixed in the center, the players are pushing against each other. They must unclip the flag from the ground (and not merely rip it off the carabiner holding it) to win. Ripping the flag will result in disqualification.
  - Played by: Svetlana vs. Beth, Svetlana vs. Kina, Brad vs. CT

=== Final challenge ===
- The Rio Deal: The final challenge begins with each player attempting to kick five penalty-shot soccer balls into a soccer net, past their opponent. The male and female player that kicks the most penalty shots past their opponent earns a two-minute headstart on their opponents at the trailhead. Each player ascends up a mountainside, to the first checkpoint, "Brazilian Blocks," in which each player must carry four large cubes to their designated puzzle piece stations, and correctly solve their puzzles within 30 minutes. The next checkpoint is "Teeter Totter," in which each player must use rocks to counterbalance their weight on a "teeter totter" for five seconds, after which, the final section is a footrace to grab a designated flag at the top of the mountain, and win $150,000.
  - Winners: Wes and Jodi
  - Runners-up: Brad and Svetlana

== Game summary ==
Episode		Gender	Winners		Duel contestants		Duel game	Duel outcome	
#	Challenge	Gender	Prize	Immune	Selected	Called Out	Duel game	Winner	Eliminated
1/2	Reaching Out	Male	Robin	Eric	Tyler	John	I Can	Tyler	John
2/3	Ring Toss	Female	Kenny	Diem	—N/a				
3	Pass With Care	Male	Jodi	Evan	Tyler	Derrick	Ascender	Derrick	Tyler
4	Roller Derby	Female	Brad	Jodi	Paula	Aneesa	Pole Wrestle	Aneesa	Paula
5	Push Over	Male	Beth	Derrick	Nehemiah	Kenny	Ascender	Nehemiah	Kenny
6	Flying Leap	Female	CT	Svetlana	Casey	Robin	Pole Wrestle	Robin	Casey
7	Throwback	Male	Kina	Evan	Eric	Nehemiah	I Can	Eric	Nehemiah
8	Rafty Race	Female	CT	Jodi	Svetlana	Beth	Push Me	Svetlana	Beth
9	Pole Dance	Male	Diem	Evan	Wes	Derrick	Pole Wrestle	Wes	Derrick
10	Dine-N-Dash	Female	Evan	Diem	Aneesa	Robin	Ascender	Aneesa	Robin
11	Stacking Stairs	Male	Jodi	Evan	Eric	Brad	Pole Wrestle	Brad	Eric
12	Ice Breakers	Female	Evan	Jodi	Svetlana	Kina	Push Me	Svetlana	Kina
13	Sunken Treasure	Male	Svetlana	Wes	Evan	CT	Ascender	CT	Evan
14	Around the Block	Female	CT	Jodi	Aneesa	Diem	I Can	Aneesa	Diem
15	Paddle Me (Note: The "Paddle Me" challenge in Episode 15 was designated as both a male and a female Duel day. Jodi and Wes both won immunity and a prize for winning this challenge. All other competitors were automatically nominated for the Duel. CT and Svetlana came in second place in this challenge, and earned the right to select the Duel they wanted to compete in against Aneesa and Brad, respectively.)	Male	Wes		CT vs. Brad		Push Me	Brad	CT
15	Paddle Me	Female	Jodi		Svetlana vs. Aneesa		I Can	Svetlana	Aneesa
16	The Rio Deal	—N/a	Wes		2nd: Brad				
16	The Rio Deal	—N/a	Jodi		2nd: Svetlana				

=== Elimination progress ===
Contestants	Challenges															
Contestants	1/2	2/3	3	4	5	6	7	8	9	10	11	12	13	14	15	Finale
Jodi	SAFE	SAFE	WON	WIN	SAFE	SAFE	SAFE	WIN	SAFE	SAFE	WON	WIN	SAFE	WIN	WIN	WINNER
Wes	SAFE	SAFE	SAFE	SAFE	SAFE	SAFE	SAFE	SAFE	ELIM	SAFE	SAFE	SAFE	WIN	SAFE	WIN	WINNER
Brad	SAFE	SAFE	SAFE	WON	SAFE	SAFE	SAFE	SAFE	SAFE	SAFE	ELIM	SAFE	SAFE	SAFE	ELIM	LOSER
Svetlana	SAFE	SAFE	SAFE	SAFE	SAFE	WIN	SAFE	ELIM	SAFE	SAFE	SAFE	ELIM	WON	SAFE	ELIM	LOSER
Aneesa	SAFE	SAFE	SAFE	ELIM	SAFE	SAFE	SAFE	SAFE	SAFE	ELIM	SAFE	SAFE	SAFE	ELIM	OUT	
CT	SAFE	SAFE	SAFE	SAFE	SAFE	WON	SAFE	WON	SAFE	SAFE	SAFE	SAFE	ELIM	WON	DQ	
Diem	SAFE	WIN	SAFE	SAFE	SAFE	SAFE	SAFE	SAFE	WON	WIN	SAFE	SAFE	SAFE	OUT		
Evan	SAFE	SAFE	WIN	SAFE	SAFE	SAFE	WIN	SAFE	WIN	WON	WIN	WON	OUT			
Kina	SAFE	SAFE	SAFE	SAFE	SAFE	SAFE	WON	SAFE	SAFE	SAFE	SAFE	OUT				
Eric	WIN	SAFE	SAFE	SAFE	SAFE	SAFE	ELIM	SAFE	SAFE	SAFE	OUT					
Robin	WON	SAFE	SAFE	SAFE	SAFE	ELIM	SAFE	SAFE	SAFE	OUT						
Derrick	SAFE	SAFE	ELIM	SAFE	WIN	SAFE	SAFE	SAFE	OUT							
Beth	SAFE	SAFE	SAFE	SAFE	WON	SAFE	SAFE	DQ								
Nehemiah	SAFE	SAFE	SAFE	SAFE	ELIM	SAFE	OUT									
Casey	SAFE	SAFE	SAFE	SAFE	SAFE	OUT										
Kenny	SAFE	WON	SAFE	SAFE	OUT											
Paula	SAFE	SAFE	SAFE	OUT												
Tyler	ELIM	SAFE	OUT													
Tina	SAFE	REM														
John	OUT															

Competition
The contestant won the final challenge
The contestant was the runner-up in the final challenge
The contestant won the challenge and immunity
The contestant won the challenge and a prize
The contestant won the Duel
The contestant lost the Duel and was eliminated
The contestant was disqualified in the Duel
The contestant was removed from the competition due to disciplinary reasons

=== Selection processes ===
Episodes
1	2	3	4	5	6	7	8	9	10	11	12	13	14	15
Eric	Diem	Evan	Jodi	Derrick	Svetlana	Evan	Jodi	Evan	Diem	Evan	Jodi	Wes	Jodi	Jodi
Robin	—N/a	Beth	Evan	Jodi	Wes	Kina	CT	Diem	CT	Jodi	Evan	Svetlana	CT	Wes
Brad	—N/a	Nehemiah	Robin	Evan	Aneesa	Derrick	Diem	CT	Kina	CT	Diem	Brad	Diem	Aneesa
Jodi	—N/a	Aneesa	Brad	Robin	Nehemiah	Jodi	Evan	Kina	Evan	Diem	CT	Aneesa	Wes	Brad
Derrick	—N/a	Wes	Kina	Brad	Beth	Brad	Robin	Derrick	Jodi	Brad	Kina	Diem	Brad	CT
Kina	—N/a	Robin	Derrick	Diem	CT	Robin	Derrick	Jodi	Brad	Svetlana	Brad	Jodi	Svetlana	Svetlana
CT	—N/a	Eric	Diem	Eric	Kina	CT	Kina	Eric	Robin	Aneesa	Wes	CT	Aneesa	
Aneesa	—N/a	Jodi	Wes	Svetlana	Derrick	Diem	Brad	Robin	Wes	Kina	Aneesa	Evan		
Wes	—N/a	Brad	Aneesa	Kenny	Robin	Wes	Beth	Aneesa	Eric	Wes	Svetlana			
Tina	—N/a	Diem	Nehemiah	Kina	Brad	Beth	Eric	Svetlana	Svetlana	Eric				
Nehemiah	—N/a	CT	Beth	CT	Jodi	Aneesa	Wes	Brad	Aneesa					
Beth	—N/a	Kina	Kenny	Casey	Evan	Svetlana	Aneesa	Wes						
Evan	—N/a	Derrick	Casey	Aneesa	Eric	Nehemiah	Svetlana							
Diem	—N/a	Casey	Eric	Beth	Diem	Eric								
Kenny	—N/a	Paula	CT	Wes	Casey									
Svetlana	—N/a	Svetlana	Svetlana	Nehemiah										
Casey	—N/a	Kenny	Paula											
Paula	—N/a	Tyler												
John														
Tyler														

The contestant won the Challenge and safety from the Duel.
The contestant was selected to go into the Duel by the contestant at the end of the selection process.
The contestant was at the end of the selection process, and was automatically nominated for the Duel.
The contestant was not picked during the selection process, but was safe because it was not their gender's elimination day.

== Teams ==
Pass With Care (Ep. 3)
Kenny & Beth
Derrick & Kina
Nehemiah & Aneesa
Wes & Svetlana
Evan & Jodi
Eric & Robin
CT & Diem
Brad & Casey
Tyler & Paula

Throwback (Ep. 7)
Wes & Svetlana
Nehemiah & Aneesa
CT & Diem
Eric & Beth
Evan & Kina
Derrick & Jodi
Brad & Robin

Pole Dance (Ep. 9)
Team CT	Team Eric
CT	Eric
Diem	Jodi
Wes	Derrick
Robin	Kina
Evan	Brad
Svetlana	Aneesa

Dine-N-Dash (Ep. 10)
Team Svetlana	Team Diem
Svetlana	Diem
Eric	CT
Jodi	Robin
Brad	Evan
Aneesa	Kina

Stacking Stairs (Ep. 11)
Brad & Kina
CT & Diem
Evan & Jodi
Eric & Aneesa
Wes & Svetlana

Sunken Treasure (Ep. 13)
CT & Diem
Evan & Jodi
Brad & Aneesa
Wes & Svetlana

Paddle Me (Ep. 15)
Brad & Aneesa
CT & Jodi
Wes & Svetlana

Notes

- Challenges where no order was present contestants are listed in alphabetical order, based on the male partner.
- In the Stacking Stairs challenge, Brad & Kina, CT & Diem, and Evan & Jodi all competed in the first heat. Eric & Aneesa and Wes & Svetlana both competed in the second heat.

== Episodes ==
No. overall	No. in season	Title	Original release date
172	1	"Welcome to Brazil"	October 12, 2006
173	2	"Welcome to Brazil"	October 12, 2006
174	3	"Goodbye Tina and Tyler"	October 19, 2006
175	4	"Paula vs. Aneesa"	October 26, 2006
176	5	"The Drama Mafia"	November 2, 2006
177	6	"Goodbye Casey"	November 9, 2006
178	7	"Nehemiah's Last Day"	November 16, 2006
179	8	"What Goes Around, Comes Around"	November 23, 2006
180	9	"Until Next Time, Derrick"	November 30, 2006
181	10	"Harsh Words"	December 7, 2006
182	11	"Friend or Foe?"	December 14, 2006
183	12	"Two For Two"	December 21, 2006
184	13	"Fallen Alliances"	January 4, 2007
185	14	"The Big Split"	January 4, 2007
186	15	"The Final Four"	January 11, 2007
187	16	"The Big Payoff"	January 18, 2007

=== Reunion special ===
The reunion special, Real World/Road Rules Challenge: The Duel Ain't Over 'til the Reunion, aired live after the season finale on January 18, 2007 and was hosted by VJ Susie Castillo.
