= The Challenge: Battle of the Bloodlines =

27th season of the reality television series

Battle of the Bloodlines
- Season 27
- Presented by: T. J. Lavin
- No. of contestants: 30
- Winners: Cara Maria Sorbello; Jamie Banks
- Location: Bodrum, Turkey; Berlin, Germany
- No. of episodes: 16 (Reunion and 2 Specials Included)

Release
- Original network: MTV
- Original release: December 2, 2015 – February 17, 2016

Season chronology
- ← Previous; Battle of the Exes II Next → Rivals III

The Challenge: Battle of the Bloodlines (occasionally promoted as The Challenge: Bloodlines) is the 27th season of MTV's reality game show, The Challenge. Filming occurred in Bodrum, Turkey and Berlin, Germany during June and July 2015, with former cast members from The Real World, Road Rules, The Challenge, and Are You the One? competing both with and against their relatives (in a concept similar to Survivor: Blood vs. Water).

A launch special episode, "Meet the New Blood," premiered on November 9, 2015 on the MTV app and website. It later aired on the network on November 18, 2015 to 538,000 first-run viewers. The season premiered with a special 90 minutes episode on December 2, 2015 on the network and app, and concluded its run on February 17, 2016, with the Reunion and "The S... They Should've Shown" specials.

== Format ==
Each team participates in numerous challenges (sometimes called "missions"), which are followed by an elimination round — "The Pit", which is alternated between male and female eliminations. The winning team of each challenge earns immunity from entering The Pit, while the last-place finisher is automatically sent to The Pit based on the designated gender. The winning team also earns the right of choosing the team has at least one player of the matching gender to compete in The Pit against the challenge losers. One player of the designated gender will represent their team in the Pit. The player who wins the elimination round returns, along with their partner to the game and has the opportunity to compete for a share of a $350,000 prize, while the losing player is eliminated from the game, along with their Bloodline.

Beginning in Episode 3, a twist to the game occurred when players were forced to compete against their bloodlines. The winning team would be safe from going into the Pit. The losing team has to send one player from the losing team into The Pit, while the winning team sends another player from the losing team into The Pit. If a player loses in The Pit, that player is not only eliminated, but so is their bloodline. Teams reverted to pairs in episode 10, and followed the original format.

In the final challenge, the final three teams competed for their share of $350,000. The winning team each earned $125,000, second place earned $75,000, and third place earned $25,000.

== Contestants ==
Alumni	Original season	Bloodline	Age^{1}	Relation	Finish
Cara Maria Sorbello	The Challenge: Fresh Meat II	Jamie Banks	28	Cousins	Winners
Cory Wharton	Real World: Ex-Plosion	Mitch Reid	24	Cousins	Runners-up
Jenna Compono	Real World: Ex-Plosion	Brianna Julig	22	Cousins	Third place
Aneesa Ferreira	The Real World: Chicago	Rianna Polin	24	Cousins	Episode 11
Johnny "Bananas" Devenanzio	The Real World: Key West	Vince Gliatta	31	Cousins	Episode 10
Abram Boise (Note: Prior to the "Air to the Throne" challenge, Abram & Mike were brought into the game as replacements for Tony & Shane.)	Road Rules: South Pacific	Mike Boise	29	Brothers	Episode 9
KellyAnne Judd	The Real World: Sydney	Anthony Cuomo	24	Cousins	Episode 8
Thomas Buell	Real World: Ex-Plosion	Stephen Buell	23	Twin brothers	Episode 7
Nany González	The Real World: Las Vegas (2011)	Nicole Ramos	23	Cousins	Episode 6
Dario Medrano	Are You the One? 2	Raphy Medrano	22	Twin brothers	Episode 5
Tony Raines	Real World: Skeletons	Shane Raines	24	Brothers	Episode 4 (Note: Tony was sent to the hospital after he initially thought he suffered a back injury during the "Meet Me Halfway" challenge. As the cast and crew were headed to the third Pit elimination at the end of episode 3, Tony fainted, and was rushed back to the hospital, where his bloodline Shane was summoned to be by Tony's side. Prior to the "Air To The Throne" challenge in episode 4, it was announced that Tony & Shane were removed from the competition. It was later revealed during the aftershow that Tony suffered a ruptured spleen as well as internal bleeding, and underwent emergency surgery.)
Camila Nakagawa	Spring Break Challenge	Larissa Nakagawa	21	Sisters	Episode 4
Leroy Garrett	The Real World: Las Vegas (2011)	Candice Fowler	23	Cousins	Episode 4 (Note: Candice suffered a busted lip and a fractured toe at the "Meet Me Halfway" challenge in episode 3. Prior to the third Pit elimination at the beginning of episode 4, Candice was removed from the game for being medically unable to continue competing. Leroy was sent home as the result of being Candice's bloodline.)
Cohutta Grindstaff	The Real World: Sydney	Jill Tuttle	26	Cousins	Episode 2
Christina LeBlanc	Are You the One? 2	Emily Reese	22	Stepsisters	Episode 1

^1 Age at start of filming.

Note: Chris "CT" Tamburello (The Real World: Paris) and Faith Brown, the sister of the late Diem Brown, make special appearances in Episode 8, while Tamburello and Zach Nichols (The Real World: San Diego) make appearances at the end of Episode 9.

=== Draft ===
The winners of the second challenge were made team captains that would divide the bloodlines into two separate teams. Cara Maria and Jamie were the captains. Challengers in gray cells indicate the bloodlines that team received after the other team chose a veteran.

Round	Red Team	Blue Team
Captain	Cara Maria	Jamie
1	Bananas	Vince
2	Candice	Leroy
3	Tony (Note: After Abram & Mike replaced Tony & Shane, Abram was placed on the red team, and Mike was placed on the blue team.)	Shane
4	Brianna	Jenna
5	Cory	Mitch
6	Nicole	Nany
7	Camila	Larissa
8	Anthony	KellyAnne
9	Thomas	Stephen
10	Rianna	Aneesa
11	Dario	Raphy

== Gameplay ==
=== Challenge games ===
- Water Battle: Played in separate male and female heats, each player runs back and forth with a bucket up a steep pile of dirt, where a water hose is hanging above. Each player tries to accumulate as much water in their bucket as possible, then run back down toward their designated team barrel, and deposit the water in their barrel. Each heat runs for ten minutes, and for the co-ed teams, each player competes against players of their respective gender. The team with the most water in their barrel wins, while the team (with at least one female player) that has the least water is automatically sent to "The Pit."
  - Winners: Cohutta & Jill
- Family Dinner: Within a glass case, players have to devour, then spit a variety of insects through a plastic tube into a measuring cup, while their bloodline has their head in a separate glass case, with a snake crawling down. One player from each team draws either a red or a blue rock out of a bag to determine which glass case they will be in. The team with the highest amount of dead insects within their measuring cup wins, while the team (with at least one male player) that has the lowest amount is automatically sent to "The Pit."
  - Winners: Cara Maria & Jamie
- Meet Me Halfway: A platform, with a narrow, unstable swinging bridge in the middle, is suspended 30 feet above water. Similar in style to "Flying Leap" from The Duel, players from each team are positioned at each end of the platform, and have to transfer one flag at a time back and forth by jumping from one end of the platform, onto the swinging bridge and toward the opposite end of the platform. The challenge is played in two different heats, with host T. J. Lavin flipping a coin to determine which team competes first. A player is disqualified if they fall into the water, which reduces the amount of flags that a team will be able to transfer. The team that transfers up to 30 flags in the least time wins, and has to select one female from the losing team, along with their bloodline, to compete in The Pit against one female (along with their bloodline) voted by the losing team. Note: Prior to the challenge, players were split up into two teams, with Cara Maria & Jamie, the winners of the previous challenge ("Family Dinner"), selecting alumni players for their team. For example, if an alumni player was selected by one team leader, their bloodline was automatically sent to the opposing team.
  - Winners: Red Team
- Heir To The Throne: Host T. J. Lavin asks each team a series of trivia questions. The challenge is played in multiple rounds, with each team splitting their team into pairs — one player is on the platform answering the questions, while the other is hanging from an inflatable tube. If a player gets two questions wrong, their partner is dropped into the water by popping the tube. The last team hanging wins.
  - Winners: Red Team
- Family Connection: Teams have to transfer up to 20 balls from one side of the beach to another, into their team basket. Each player is wearing a helmet with a square panel that resembles a graduation tassel, and after a ball is dispensed, players from each have to transfer the balls by using their heads and not their hands. If a ball hits the ground, it is out of play. The team that transfers the most balls into their basket within a 10-minute limit wins.
  - Winners: Red Team
- Hand Me Down: Players from each team traverse a series of five ropes that are hanging from a platform at the top of the Folkart Towers. A player is disqualified if he/she falls from the rope or refuses to compete. The team to advance the most players from one end of the platform to the other wins.
  - Winners: Red Team
- Too Clingy: A large cargo net is placed above a pond. Players from each team have to race up a ladder and from one end of the net to another, then advance on the underside of the net to the other side. A player is disqualified if he/she falls into the water before reaching the finish line. The team that advances the most players to the finish line or in the least time wins. Note: This challenge was played in honor of the late Diem Brown - for the notable moment in which she (having just completed a cancer treatment) took off her wig before swimming through a muddy pit in "Ring Toss" challenge (The Duel) and winning the challenge.
  - Winners: Red Team
- Air Pockets: Players from each team have to swim 150 feet downward from a yacht to a buoy that is holding a flag, where there are six cages with limited air supply for two players. If one player makes it to the enclosed cage, where they can catch their breath, they have to wait until another teammate joins them before advancing to the next "air pocket." A player is disqualified if he/she makes their way above water before reaching the final "air pocket." After submerging into the sixth "air pocket," where the flag is located, players have to swim back to the yacht. The team to complete the challenge in the fastest time, or have the most players complete the challenge wins.
  - Winners: Red Team
- Weight For Me: Each team hikes up a mountain in an endurance race, with checkpoints reminiscent of the season's missions. The checkpoints include crawling under a cargo net, pulling chains into a designated circle, using a rope to advance on a balance beam and advancing from one end of a set of monkey bars to another. Players from each team have to alternate between carrying up a heavy bag to each checkpoint (75 lbs. for the guys and 40 lbs. for the girls) and having their teammate complete the checkpoints. The final checkpoint at the top of the mountain is a puzzle, in which each partner is required to participate in. The first team to complete each checkpoint and solve their puzzle in the fastest time wins, while the last-place team is automatically sent to The Pit.
  - Winners: Cory & Mitch
- Truck Crossing: Each team has to advance from one tractor trailer to another, with five cars in between, while moving at a speed of 40 mph on a runway. Similar in style to the "Speed Dating" challenge from Battle of the Exes II, each player is attached to a safety harness that is hanging from a platform on one moving trailer. At the end of the first tractor trailer, players have to climb down a cargo net before reaching the first of five cars. The team that advances to the second tractor trailer in the fastest time wins and automatically punches their ticket to the final challenge, while the last-place team is automatically sent to The Pit.
  - Winners: Cory & Mitch

=== Pit games ===
- End Of My Rope: Only one player from each team competes in this elimination, and from a distance, has to unravel their rope over a series of poles in order to create slack, enabling them to clip one end of their rope to a carabiner. The first player to clip their rope to their carabiner wins the elimination round for their team.
  - Played by: Jenna vs. Christina
- Squaring Off: Similar to the "Hall Brawl" eliminations from Battle of the Seasons (2012) and Battle of the Exes II, players have to retrieve a soccer ball within a series of square hallways, and advance the ball past their opponent's goal line. The first player to advance the ball past their opponent's goal line twice wins the elimination round for their team.
  - Played by: Thomas vs. Cohutta
- Door Slammer: Players must push a door and their opponent into a door frame. Played in a best-of-three rounds, the player who wins two rounds wins.
  - Played by: Jenna vs. Larissa
- My Way or the Highway: Players engage in a tug-of-war with chains, and have to pull their opponent forward until a yellow mark on the chain matches with a white line in the middle of the course. The first player to pull their opponent forward wins.
  - Played by: Mitch vs. Raphy
- Ring My Bell: Players have to run back and forth and smack themselves into a mattress, which will ring a bell on the other side. The first player to ring their bell 50 times wins.
  - Played by: KellyAnne vs. Nany
- Home Wrecker: Players are given two identical rooms with furniture and a sledge hammer. In each room is a small slot in the wall to fit all furniture through. The first player to break all of their furniture and fixtures down to small pieces and insert all of it through the slot wins.
  - Played by: Mike vs. Stephen
- Spun Out: Players spin downward from a swing from the top of a platform, then have to perform two tasks while dizzy. The first task is to balance on one foot on a wooden pole for ten seconds, and the second task is to place a series of twelve wooden stumps into a column on top of a wooden pole. Each task is performed in two separate rounds, and the player who completes each task in the least combined amount of time wins.
  - Played by: Jenna vs. KellyAnne
- Hand It Over: Players engage in a tug-of-war with three oversize metal poles that are positioned on both sides of a wall. Each pole is positioned at three different heights. If a player cannot pull their pole from the opponent in a best-of-three match, the winner is determined by which player lasts longer against their opponent.
  - Played by: Jamie vs. CT & Mike vs. Zach (Note: Jamie and Mike were selected for The Pit in episode 9. However, instead of facing each other, each player was set up to face either CT or Zach in the "Hand it Over" pit elimination.)
- Through Thick and Thin: Teams have to solve a multi-colored puzzle, with one player using a sledge hammer to break through a cinderblock wall, allowing their teammate to advance through the wall. Each player participates in the elimination round. The first team to complete their puzzle wins.
  - Played by: Cara Maria & Jamie vs. Bananas & Vince
- Mine Not Yours: The first player to wrestle a handle from their opponent twice wins.
  - Played by: Cara Maria vs. Aneesa

=== Final challenge ===
The final challenge is separated into two different stages.

The first stage, which contains four checkpoints, takes place on four stories of an old CIA facility in Berlin, Germany. Prior to each checkpoint, each competitor has to run one lap around the facility, with a heavy bag strapped to their backs — 120 lbs. for the guys, 60 lbs. for the girls. The first checkpoint is "Barrel Roll," in which each player must roll six barrels up a hill, prior to collecting their team tokens. The second checkpoint is "Flip Flop," in which each player must catapult beer steins into a barrel, from a distance. If a player misses the barrel with their beer steins, they must drink a glass of non-alcoholic beer. For the third checkpoint — "Block Head," players must complete a puzzle using oversize 3D blocks, with each block placed flush against the puzzle board. The final checkpoint of Stage 1 is "Don't Get Tired," in which players must use two tires to form bridge from one end of a course to another. If one player makes any contact with the ground, both teammates must restart the checkpoint.

The second stage begins with "Job Detail" — each player is required to wear business suits, and must carry briefcases required to complete the final challenge. Each team is required to eat a variety of bizarre German foods, and will be assessed a five-minute penalty for each plate that they do not finish within a one-hour time limit. In the next stage, "Train Delay," each player must hold a briefcase and stay in a designated circle within Berlin Innsbrucker Platz station. A time penalty is assessed if a briefcase touches the ground, and if the player holding the briefcase needs sleep on a bench, they must trade places with their teammate. Host T. J. Lavin then revealed to each team that there was no train, with no time penalties assessed. Later, in "Row Hard," each player has to paddle 10 miles down the Spree River, until they reach the Olympiastadion, where puzzle stations await each player at a "Coded Entrance." Each player must use puzzle pieces from their briefcases to solve their puzzles prior to entering the Olympiastadion, then run eight laps inside. The first-place team wins $250,000, second-place wins $75,000 and third-place wins $25,000.

- Winners: Cara Maria & Jamie
- Second place: Cory & Mitch
- Third place: Jenna & Brianna

== Game summary ==
Episode		Gender	Challenge winners	Pit contestants				Pit game	Pit outcome		
#	Challenge	Gender	Challenge winners	Last-place team	Winners' selection	Last-place player	Selected player	Pit game	Winner	Loser	Eliminated
1	Water Battle	Female	Cohutta & Jill	Jenna & Brianna	Christina & Emily	Jenna	Christina	End Of My Rope	Jenna	Christina	Christina & Emily
2	Family Dinner	Male	Cara Maria & Jamie	Cohutta & Jill	Thomas & Stephen	Cohutta	Thomas	Squaring Off	Thomas	Cohutta	Cohutta & Jill
	Challenge	Gender	Winners	—N/a		Losers' pick	Winners' pick	Pit game	Winner	Loser	Eliminated
3/4	Meet Me Halfway	Female	Red Team	—N/a		Larissa	Jenna	Door Slammer	Jenna	Larissa	Camila & Larissa
4/5	Heir To The Throne	Male	Red Team	—N/a		Raphy	Mitch	My Way or the Highway	Mitch	Raphy	Dario & Raphy
6	Family Connection	Female	Red Team	—N/a		KellyAnne	Nany	Ring My Bell	KellyAnne	Nany	Nany & Nicole
7	Hand Me Down	Male	Red Team	—N/a		Mike	Stephen	Home Wrecker	Mike	Stephen	Thomas & Stephen
8	Too Clingy	Female	Red Team	—N/a		Jenna	KellyAnne	Spun Out	Jenna	KellyAnne	KellyAnne & Anthony
9	Air Pockets	Male	Red Team	—N/a		Mike	Jamie	Hand it Over	Jamie	Mike	Abram & Mike
	Challenge	Gender	Winners	Last-place team	Winners' selection	Last-place player	Selected player	Pit game	Winner	Loser	Eliminated
10	Weight for Me	—N/a	Cory & Mitch	Cara Maria & Jamie	Bananas & Vince	—N/a		Through Thick and Thin	Cara Maria & Jamie	Bananas & Vince	Bananas & Vince
11	Truck Crossing	Female	Cory & Mitch	Aneesa & Rianna	Cara Maria & Jamie	Aneesa	Cara Maria	Mine Not Yours	Cara Maria	Aneesa	Aneesa & Rianna
12/13	Final Challenge	—N/a	Cara Maria & Jamie	2nd place: Cory & Mitch; 3rd place: Jenna & Brianna							

=== Elimination progress ===
Contestants	Episodes										
Contestants	1	2	3/4	4/5	6	7	8	9	10	11	Finale
Cara Maria	SAFE	WIN	WIN	WIN	WIN	WIN	WIN	WON	ELIM	ELIM	WINNER
Jamie	SAFE	WIN	SAFE	SAFE	SAFE	SAFE	SAFE	ELIM	ELIM	RISK	WINNER
Cory	SAFE	SAFE	WIN	WON	WIN	WIN	WIN	WIN	WIN	WIN	SECOND
Mitch	SAFE	SAFE	SAFE	ELIM	SAFE	SAFE	SAFE	SAFE	WIN	WIN	SECOND
Jenna	ELIM	SAFE	ELIM	SAFE	SAFE	SAFE	ELIM	SAFE	SAFE	SAFE	THIRD
Brianna	RISK	SAFE	WON	WIN	WIN	WIN	WON	WIN	SAFE	SAFE	THIRD
Rianna	SAFE	SAFE	WIN	WIN	WIN	WIN	WIN	WIN	SAFE	LOST	
Aneesa	SAFE	SAFE	SAFE	SAFE	SAFE	SAFE	SAFE	SAFE	SAFE	OUT	
Bananas	SAFE	SAFE	WIN	WIN	WIN	WIN	WIN	WIN	OUT		
Vince	SAFE	SAFE	SAFE	SAFE	SAFE	SAFE	SAFE	SAFE	OUT		
Abram	—N/a		—N/a	WIN	WIN	WON	WIN	LOST			
Mike	—N/a		—N/a	SAFE	SAFE	ELIM	SAFE	OUT			
Anthony	SAFE	SAFE	WIN	WIN	WON	WIN	LOST				
KellyAnne	SAFE	SAFE	SAFE	SAFE	ELIM	SAFE	OUT				
Thomas	SAFE	ELIM	WIN	WIN	WIN	LOST					
Stephen	SAFE	RISK	SAFE	SAFE	SAFE	OUT					
Nicole	SAFE	SAFE	WIN	WIN	LOST						
Nany	SAFE	SAFE	SAFE	SAFE	OUT						
Dario	SAFE	SAFE	WIN	LOST							
Raphy	SAFE	SAFE	SAFE	OUT							
Shane	SAFE	SAFE	SAFE	DQ							
Tony	SAFE	SAFE	WIN	MED							
Camila	SAFE	SAFE	LOST								
Larissa	SAFE	SAFE	OUT								
Leroy	SAFE	SAFE	DQ								
Candice	SAFE	SAFE	MED								
Jill	WIN	LOST									
Cohutta	WIN	OUT									
Emily	LOST										
Christina	OUT										

Competition
The contestant's team won the final challenge
The contestant's team lost the final challenge
The contestant's team won the mission and was safe
The contestant was safe from the Pit
The contestant was placed into the Pit and won
The contestant's bloodline was placed into the Pit and won
The contestant was on the winning team, however their bloodline was placed into the Pit and won
The contestant was placed into the Pit and lost
The contestant was eliminated due to their bloodline losing in the Pit
The contestant was removed from the competition due to medical reasons
The contestant was forced to leave the competition due to their bloodline being removed

=== Voting ===
Last-place	Jenna & Brianna	Cohutta & Jill	—N/a						Cara Maria & Jamie	Aneesa & Rianna
Voted into the Pit	Christina & Emily; 1 of 1 votes	Thomas & Stephen; 1 of 1 votes	Larissa; 8 of 12 votes	Raphy; 6 of 10 votes	KellyAnne; 9 of 9 votes	Mike; 8 of 8 votes	Jenna; 4 of 7 votes	Mike; 6 of 6 votes	Bananas & Vince; 1 of 1 votes	Cara Maria & Jamie; 1 of 1 votes
Voted into the Pit	Christina & Emily; 1 of 1 votes	Thomas & Stephen; 1 of 1 votes	Jenna; 9 of 11 votes	Mitch; 6 of 10 votes	Nany; 8 of 9 votes	Stephen; 6 of 8 votes	KellyAnne; 5 of 7 votes	Jamie; 6 of 6 votes	Bananas & Vince; 1 of 1 votes	Cara Maria & Jamie; 1 of 1 votes
Voter	Episode									
Voter	1	2	3/4	4/5	6	7	8	9	10	11
Cara Maria		Thomas & Stephen	Jenna	Mitch	Nany	Stephen	KellyAnne	Jamie		
Jamie		Thomas & Stephen	Larissa	Raphy	KellyAnne	Mike	KellyAnne	Mike		
Cory			Jenna	Mike	Nany	Jamie	Aneesa	Jamie	Bananas & Vince	Cara Maria & Jamie
Mitch			Larissa	Mike	KellyAnne	Mike	Jenna	Mike	Bananas & Vince	Cara Maria & Jamie
Jenna			Larissa	Raphy	KellyAnne	Mike	KellyAnne	Mike		
Brianna			KellyAnne	Mitch	Aneesa	Stephen	KellyAnne	Jamie		
Aneesa			KellyAnne	Raphy	KellyAnne	Mike	Jenna	Mike		
Rianna			Jenna	Mike	Nany	Stephen	KellyAnne	Jamie		
Bananas			Jenna	Mitch	Nany	Stephen	KellyAnne	Jamie		
Vince			Larissa	Raphy	KellyAnne	Mike	Jenna	Mike		
Abram				Mitch	Nany	Stephen	KellyAnne	Jamie		
Mike				Raphy	KellyAnne	Mike	KellyAnne	Mike		
KellyAnne			Larissa	Mike	KellyAnne	Mike	Jenna			
Anthony			Jenna	Mitch	Nany	Stephen	Aneesa			
Thomas			Jenna	Mike	Nany	Jamie				
Stephen			Larissa	Mike	KellyAnne	Mike				
Nany			Aneesa	Raphy	KellyAnne					
Nicole			Aneesa	Mitch	Nany					
Dario			Jenna	Mike						
Raphy			Larissa	Mike						
Tony			N/A							
Shane			Jenna							
Camila			Jenna							
Larissa			Jenna							
Leroy			Larissa							
Candice			Jenna							
Cohutta	Christina & Emily									
Jill	Christina & Emily									
Christina										
Emily										

== Episodes ==
No. overall	No. in season	Title	Original release date	US viewers (millions)
329	1	"There Will Be Blood"	December 2, 2015	0.55
330	2	"Bad Blood"	December 9, 2015	0.56
331	3	"Camilanator: Judgement Day"	December 16, 2015	0.68
332	4	"Corneesa"	December 23, 2015	0.69
333	5	"A House Divided"	December 30, 2015	0.84
334	6	"Dirty Little Secret"	December 30, 2015	0.79
335	7	"Blood Brothers"	January 6, 2016	0.76
336	8	"Blood Is Thicker Than Mud"	January 13, 2016	0.88
337	9	"Blood Versus Love"	January 20, 2016	0.93
338	10	"Out For Blood"	January 27, 2016	0.72
339	11	"Tear Down This Wall"	February 3, 2016	0.79
340	12	"True Blood"	February 10, 2016	0.73
341	13	"Family Matters"	February 17, 2016	0.88

=== Reunion special ===
The Reunion special aired on February 17, 2016, following the season finale and was hosted by Nessa. The cast members who attended the reunion were Cara Maria, Jamie, Cory, Mitch, Jenna, Brianna, Aneesa, Rianna, Bananas, Vince, Abram, KellyAnne, Nany and Nicole.

== After filming ==
Nicole Ramos was a main cast member on the second season of Ex on the Beach, which premiered December 20, 2018.

=== Subsequent seasons of The Challenge ===
Cast member	Subsequent seasons of The Challenge
Anthony Cuomo	—N/a
Brianna Julig	—N/a
Candice Fowler	—N/a
Emily Reese	—N/a
Jamie Banks	Rivals III
Jill Tuttle	—N/a
Larissa Nakagawa	—N/a
Mike Boise	—N/a
Mitch Reid	—N/a
Nicole Ramos	Rivals III, XXX: Dirty 30, Vendettas
Raphy Medrano	—N/a
Rianna Polin	—N/a
Shane Raines	XXX: Dirty 30
Stephen Buell	—N/a
Vince Gliatta	Rivals III
