= The Challenge: Battle of the Exes =

22nd season of the reality television series

Coordinates: 19°45′15.1″N 70°28′51.5″W

Battle of the Exes
- Season 22
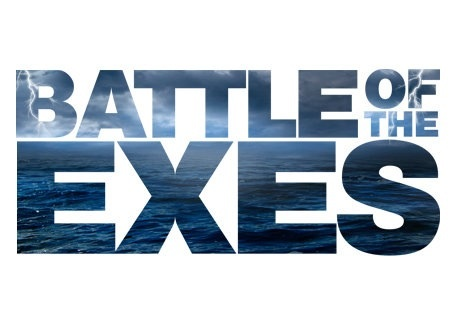
- Presented by: T. J. Lavin
- No. of contestants: 26
- Winners: Johnny Devenanzio; Camila Nakagawa
- Location: Sosúa, Dominican Republic; Reykjavík, Iceland
- No. of episodes: 13 (2 Specials & Reunion Included)

Release
- Original network: MTV
- Original release: January 25 – April 4, 2012

Season chronology
- ← Previous; Rivals Next → Battle of the Seasons

The Challenge: Battle of the Exes is the 22nd season of the MTV reality game show, The Challenge. It took place in the Dominican Republic and Iceland, with cast members from The Real World, Road Rules and The Challenge competing. A launch special, "The Pre-Game," premiered on January 11, 2012, explaining the history behind the couples. The season premiered on January 25, 2012, and concluded on April 4, 2012, with the Reunion special.

This is the first edition of the Battle of the Exes series, with Battle of the Exes II following in 2015.

== Format ==
Each team participates in numerous challenges (sometimes called "missions"), which are followed by an elimination round — "The Dome". The winning team of each challenge earns the title of "Power Couple," as well as immunity from entering The Dome, while the last-place finisher is automatically sent to The Dome. The "Power Couple" also earns the right of choosing the team that has to face the last-place finisher in The Dome (from Episode 6, the "Power Couple" was also awarded a $2,500 prize, in addition to their immunity and nomination power). The team who wins the elimination round returns to the game and has a shot at a $300,000 prize, while the losing team is eliminated from the game.

At the end of the season, three teams compete in the final challenge. The first-place finisher wins $150,000, second-place wins $100,000 and third-place wins $40,000.

== Contestants ==
Male contestants	Original season	Finish
Johnny Devenanzio	The Real World: Key West	Winner
Chris "CT" Tamburello	The Real World: Paris	Runner-up
Ty Ruff	The Real World: D.C.	Third place
Mark Long	Road Rules: USA – The First Adventure	Episode 9
Dunbar Merrill	The Real World: Sydney	Episode 8
Abram Boise	Road Rules: South Pacific	Episode 5
Tyrie Ballard	The Real World: Denver	Episode 4
Leroy Garrett	The Real World: Las Vegas (2011)	Episode 3
Dustin Zito	The Real World: Las Vegas (2011)	Episode 3 (Note: In Episode 3, Dustin suffered a knee injury at the house that required stitches and he was medically prohibited from competing. Heather was sent home as well since she was Dustin's partner.)
Wes Bergmann	The Real World: Austin	Episode 2
Vinny Foti	The Challenge: Fresh Meat II	Episode 2 (Note: Vinny & Sarah won the "Hook Up" challenge in Episode 2. However, they were later disqualified from the competition, following an incident at a nightclub in which Vinny ripped off Mandi's dress in public, exposing her breasts. Sarah was sent home as well since she was Vinny's partner. Because they were the Power Couple at the time of their disqualification, the winning couple of the Dome elimination round became the new Power Couple.)
Nate Stodghill	The Real World: San Diego (2011)	Episode 1

Female contestants	Original season	Finish
Camila Nakagawa	Spring Break Challenge	Winner
Diem Brown	Real World/Road Rules Challenge: Fresh Meat	Runner-up
Emily Schromm	The Real World: D.C.	Third place
Robin Hibbard	The Real World: San Diego (2004)	Episode 9
Paula Meronek	The Real World: Key West	Episode 8
Aneesa Ferreira	The Real World: Chicago	Episode 6
Rachel Robinson	Road Rules: Campus Crawl	Episode 6
Cara Maria Sorbello	The Challenge: Fresh Meat II	Episode 5
Jasmine Reynaud	The Real World: Cancun	Episode 4
Naomi Defensor	The Real World: Las Vegas (2011)	Episode 3
Heather Marter	The Real World: Las Vegas (2011)	Episode 3
Mandi Moyer	The Challenge: Fresh Meat II	Episode 2
Sarah Rice	The Real World: Brooklyn	Episode 2
Priscilla Mendez	The Real World: San Diego (2011)	Episode 1

=== Teams ===
Team	Partner 1	Partner 2
Cara Maria & Abram	Abram Boise	Cara Maria Sorbello
Aneesa & Rachel	Aneesa Ferreira	Rachel Robinson
Diem & CT	Chris "CT" Tamburello	Diem Brown
Dunbar & Paula	Dunbar Merrill	Paula Meronek
Dustin & Heather	Dustin Zito	Heather Marter
Johnny & Camila	Johnny Devenanzio	Camila Nakagawa
Leroy & Naomi	Leroy Garrett	Naomi Defensor
Mark & Robin	Mark Long	Robin Hibbard
Nate & Priscilla	Nate Stodghill	Priscilla Mendez
Ty & Emily	Ty Ruff	Emily Schromm
Tyrie & Jasmine	Tyrie Ballard	Jasmine Reynaud
Vinny & Sarah	Vinny Foti	Sarah Rice
Wes & Mandi	Wes Bergmann	Mandi Moyer

=== Pre-season romantic backgrounds ===
- Abram & Cara Maria: The two met on Cutthroat and began to show affection for each other throughout the entire season of The Challenge. After the show ended, the two continued to date, and Abram provided moral support to Cara Maria over the phone during her stint on Rivals. However, the two separated after Abram was arrested following a disturbing and highly publicized brush with the law.
- Aneesa & Rachel: The two met on Battle of the Sexes and developed a relationship after the show, which was unknown to most viewers until this relationship was revealed during The Duel II, where tension occurred between Aneesa, Rachel, and Rachel's newest partner at the time, Jenn Grijalva.
- CT & Diem: The two met on The Duel, where CT instantly developed a crush on Diem, who, at the time, was dealing with the side-effects of her chemotherapy resulting from her battle with ovarian cancer. CT had helped Diem to feel confident with herself by the end of her time on The Challenge, and the two began dating after. The two were still dating as of The Gauntlet III, but after the show, Diem decided she wanted to pursue a career and felt that a relationship would interfere. Diem broke up with CT prior to the reunion. In The Duel II, Diem indicated that she believed she would marry CT, but that she wanted to put her career first at that time. CT was removed from the show after engaging in an ugly brawl with Adam King relating to CT's and Diem's relationship. CT also mentioned in the season premiere that Diem did not go to the wake after his brother died.
- Dunbar & Paula: The two had a relationship based upon fighting with each other, and kissing and making up throughout The Island and The Duel II. It was revealed on The Duel II Reunion that the two did have sexual intercourse after leaving New Zealand. After feeling betrayed by Dunbar before her elimination on Cutthroat, Paula felt as if she could no longer trust him, and Dunbar stated that he was done with Paula.
- Dustin & Heather: The two were season sweethearts on their season of The Real World: Las Vegas (2011) and dated, until shocking revelations about Dustin's past tore their relationship apart. They later got back together in an on-and-off relationship.
- Johnny & Camila: Camila had stated that she had a crush on Johnny and that she would marry him on Cutthroat, but nothing much was shown happening between the two of them. A possible fling was hinted at during the season's "The S#!% They Should've Shown" special, where Johnny and Camila were suspected of hooking up in the house bathroom and averting detection by having Camila possibly leave through the room's window. Johnny was in a relationship at the time, and in interviews for the special, he and Jenn Grijalva denied any fling between Johnny and Camila, however, RW: Cancun alumna Jonna Mannion hinted on Derrick Kosinski's Ultimate Challenge Radio podcast that a fling between the two did occur during Rivals.
- Leroy & Naomi: The two were "friends with benefits" during their season of The Real World: Las Vegas (2011), but only got together at night if neither had found someone else that day. During this time, Naomi had a medical scare where she believed she might either be pregnant or have contracted an STD, which stressed their casual relationship.
- Mark & Robin: The two met on Battle of the Sexes 2, where the two began a relationship that lasted even after the season had ended. On The Inferno II, Robin and Tonya got into an argument over Mark. In the first episode of The Duel, Robin revealed that she was single, and was no longer dating Mark.
- Nate & Priscilla: Due to Priscilla's underage status during her time on The Real World: San Diego (2011), she was unable to enter the bars and clubs with her 21+ year-old roommates, and one night, Nate stayed home with her, and the two made out while alone in the house. Nothing more occurred after this instance, despite an attempt by an intoxicated Priscilla during a group trip to Cabo San Lucas.
- Ty & Emily: The two quickly connected and began a relationship on their original season of The Real World: DC, but during the season the relationship turned bad when Ty's behavior became too much for Emily to handle, and she became wary of entering a serious relationship with him. Ty and Emily later got into a tumultuous argument on Cutthroat.
- Tyrie & Jasmine: The two began a relationship in the first episode of Rivals, despite Jasmine having a boyfriend at the time.
- Vinny & Sarah: The two were partners on Fresh Meat II, and began a relationship in that season's second episode. On Cutthroat, after Sarah stated that she would be voting Vinny into the Gulag, he expressed that he was done with any kind of friendship with her.
- Wes & Mandi: The two were teammates on Fresh Meat II, but would later hook up on Rivals after CT no longer expressed any interest in Mandi.

== Gameplay ==
=== Challenge games ===
- Give Me Some Honey: Players walk on a beam, from a platform that is suspended above water, from one side to the other, and have to soak themselves in a bathtub filled with honey. The players have to transfer honey to their partners only using their bodies. Once a player has soaked himself/herself with honey, that player has to walk back on the beam to their partner and have their partner scrub off the honey into a bucket. The other partner does the same, and the process repeats for ten minutes or until the bucket is completely filled with honey before the ten-minute time limit expires. The two teams with the most honey then face off in a five-minute competition to determine the winner, while the team with the least honey is automatically sent to "The Dome."
  - Winners: Johnny & Camila
- Hook Up: Teams have to make it from one end of a platform to another that is suspended 30 feet above the water. The platform contains six beams. Players use a metal hook, and have to hang it from rings suspended above them in order to swing from beam to beam. Teams are disqualified if one or both players fall into the water. The teams with the two best performances will then face off in a competition, in which the team that clears the most beams wins, while the team who clears the fewest beams is automatically sent to "The Dome."
  - Winners: Vinny & Sarah
- Mental Connection: T. J. Lavin will ask each team a series of questions, ranging from pop culture to past challenges, while laying on a platform forty feet in the air. If a player gets the question wrong, they will be dropped into the water. Even if one player drops, their teammate can continue to compete, and rack up points for their team. The two teams that have the most points at the end will compete against each other to become the power couple, while the team with the fewest points is automatically sent to "The Dome."
  - Winners: Dunbar & Paula
- Rolling in the Deep: Teams have to hold onto a log that is suspended above water, and will be spun around in circles until players fall into water. Once players fall into the water, they have to swim toward the opposite side of a lagoon, and both players have to ring a bell. The two teams with the fastest time will compete against each other to become the power couple, while the team with the slowest time is automatically sent to "The Dome."
  - Winners: Johnny & Camila
- Don't Rock the Boat: Teams have to climb rigging onto ascending masts to the top of a shipwrecked boat, and ring a bell at the crow's nest. Connected to safety harnesses, the teams must jump from mast to mast but can only do so after both partners are standing or sitting on each. The two teams with the fastest times will compete against each other to become the power couple, while the team with the slowest time is automatically sent to "The Dome."
  - Winners: Mark & Robin
- Lube Me Up: (Note: The same-sex pairing of Aneesa & Rachel would both participate in the female heat - meaning that they both had to get a ball in order to avoid elimination. The pairing did not compete in the male heat.) Players run and slide down a slippery course, and have to advance oversize balls up the slope, while using ropes to guide them, and break a plane halfway toward the top of the course. The challenge is played in multiple rounds, alternating between male and female. In each round, there is one fewer ball than there are players. If a player does not advance a ball toward the goal at the end of the round, that player, along with their partner, is eliminated from remainder of the challenge. The process continues until the player who advances the last ball up the slope wins the challenge for their team earning the Power Couple title and a special prize of $2,500. The team who's eliminated first is automatically sent to "The Dome."
  - Winners: Johnny & Camila
- Race to the Altar: Teams have to race through an obstacle course on the beach, containing check points which includes putting on wedding attire, climbing over a wall, eating the top two layers of a three-tiered wedding cake, changing a flat tire and the male players carrying their female partner to the end of the course. The team that finishes in last place at the end of each check point is eliminated, while the team that makes it to the end of the course wins, while the first team eliminated is automatically sent to "The Dome."
  - Winners: CT & Diem
- Feel the Burn: Teams have to transfer items from a picnic setup on one side of an airfield to another, while batting 80 mph winds generated from a private jet. The items include chairs, tables, beach balls, an umbrella and a couple of mannequins on another side of the airfield. Teams can make as many trips back and forth as possible to transfer each picnic item, but if any items fly away, they must be retrieved as quickly as possible. After teams have built their picnic area, they must race down wind 50 yards, retrieve a parachute, and race against the jet stream to the finish line before a 20-minute time limit expires. The team with the fastest time not only wins the Power Couple, but is also guaranteed a spot in the final challenge, while the team with the slowest time is automatically sent to "The Dome."
  - Winners: CT & Diem

=== Dome games ===
- X Knocks The Spot: Players stand on a platform, across from their partner, in the shape of an "X," and have to jump over and duck under swinging bars. A team loses if both partners fall off their individual platforms.
  - Played by: Wes & Mandi vs. Nate & Priscilla and Aneesa & Rachel vs. Tyrie & Jasmine
- X Battle: Players battle one-on-one against each other, trying to wrestle an "X" from their opponent's hands. Played in two same-gender rounds, the best two out of three wins that round. In the event of a tie, a coin-flip will determine the gender that would go against each other in one sudden death round.
  - Played by: Leroy & Naomi vs. Wes & Mandi, Ty & Emily vs. Abram & Cara Maria and Johnny & Camila vs. Mark & Robin
- Banded Together: Teams will be joined together by a rubber band rope at one pole, and the teams must work together and work their way to the pole on the opposite side of the field, and hold onto the pole for five seconds. The farther the teams get from one pole, the harder it will be to reach the pole. The team that reaches the other pole first and holds on for five seconds wins.
  - Played by: Ty & Emily vs. Leroy & Naomi and Dunbar & Paula vs. Aneesa & Rachel
- Hall Pass: Teams have to transfer colored balls through a narrow passage that contains bails of hay on both sides. Played in two same-gender rounds, the first player to transfer five colored balls from one side to the other wins the round for their team. In the event of a tie, a coin-flip will determine the gender that would go against each other in one sudden death round.
  - Played by: Ty & Emily vs. Dunbar & Paula

=== Viking Quest Final Challenge ===
The final challenge consisted of the following checkpoints:

- Checkpoint 1, "Dog Sledding": Teams start out by racing on dogsleds on an Icelandic glacier for one mile to the first checkpoint, and will collect the first of seven Viking artifacts that will be needed to unlock a giant key to the final prize.
- Checkpoint 2, "River Plunge": Each team has to remove layers of warm clothing, jump into an icy river, tag a buoy in the middle of the river, and run back as fast as possible, where each team will return to a warming van and will be assisted by medics. (Note: It is a timed event that will be added to each team's dog sledding time, and the team with the fastest combined time wins the best sleeping arrangements on the glacier, with each team camping overnight.)
- Checkpoint 3, "Feast For a Viking": Each team has to devour an animal's head and drink sheep's blood out of a Viking horn before they can collect their third artifact.
- Checkpoint 4, "Ice Key": Each team has to break a lock box in order to retrieve a key needed to unchain snow shoes and trekking poles that each team will be required to wear to the next checkpoint.
- Checkpoint 5, "Poled Out": Teams must complete a puzzle using 12 out of 13 oversize logs and boulders to create six boundaries of equal size in the shape of a hexagon, and once the boundaries are complete, each team must carry one oversize log to the next checkpoint. (Note: Ty & Emily were allowed to advance to the next checkpoint, after they failed to complete the puzzle within a 30-minute time limit.)
- Checkpoint 6, "What An Ice Hole": Teams must "tunnel" their way through and under a snow drift using ice axes.
- Checkpoint 7, "Sliced Up": Teams have to spin a giant wooden totem pole (resembling a Rubik's Cube) containing Viking symbols to where each side matches the symbols on all four sides.
- Final Checkpoint, "Finish It": Each team has to correctly place each Viking artifact retrieved from the previous checkpoints on a Viking sundial in order to open up the sundial containing a Viking horn. From there, the final race is a climb up a mountain, where a flag at the finish line is located.
  - Winners: Johnny & Camila ($150,000)
  - Second place: CT & Diem ($100,000)
  - Third place: Ty & Emily ($40,000)

Sources for this section:

== Game summary ==
Episode		Winners	Dome contestants		Dome game	Dome outcome	
#	Challenge	Winners	Last-place	Winners' pick	Dome game	Winners	Eliminated
1	Give Me Some Honey	Johnny & Camila	Nate & Priscilla	Wes & Mandi	X Knocks the Spot	Wes & Mandi	Nate & Priscilla
2	Hook Up	Vinny & Sarah	Leroy & Naomi	Wes & Mandi	X Battle	Leroy & Naomi	Wes & Mandi
3	Mental Connection	Dunbar & Paula	Leroy & Naomi	Ty & Emily	Banded Together	Ty & Emily	Leroy & Naomi
4	Rolling in the Deep	Johnny & Camila	Tyrie & Jasmine	Aneesa & Rachel	X Knocks the Spot	Aneesa & Rachel	Tyrie & Jasmine
5	Don't Rock the Boat	Mark & Robin	Abram & Cara Maria	Ty & Emily	X Battle	Ty & Emily	Abram & Cara Maria
6	Lube Me Up	Johnny & Camila	Dunbar & Paula	Aneesa & Rachel	Banded Together	Dunbar & Paula	Aneesa & Rachel
7/8	Race to the Altar	CT & Diem	Ty & Emily	Dunbar & Paula	Hall Pass	Ty & Emily	Dunbar & Paula
8/9	Feel the Burn	CT & Diem	Johnny & Camila	Mark & Robin	X Battle	Johnny & Camila	Mark & Robin
9/10	Viking Quest	Johnny & Camila	2nd place: CT & Diem; 3rd place: Ty & Emily				

=== Elimination progress ===
Teams	Episode								
Teams	1	2	3	4	5	6	7/8	8/9	Finale
Johnny & Camila	WIN	SAFE	SAFE	WIN	SAFE	WIN	SAFE	ELIM	WINNERS
CT & Diem	SAFE	SAFE	SAFE	SAFE	SAFE	SAFE	WIN	WIN	SECOND
Ty & Emily	SAFE	SAFE	ELIM	SAFE	ELIM	SAFE	ELIM	SAFE	THIRD
Mark & Robin	SAFE	SAFE	SAFE	SAFE	WIN	SAFE	SAFE	OUT	
Dunbar & Paula	SAFE	SAFE	WIN	SAFE	SAFE	ELIM	OUT		
Aneesa & Rachel	SAFE	SAFE	SAFE	ELIM	SAFE	OUT			
Abram & Cara Maria	SAFE	SAFE	SAFE	SAFE	OUT				
Tyrie & Jasmine	SAFE	SAFE	SAFE	OUT					
Leroy & Naomi	SAFE	ELIM	OUT						
Dustin & Heather	SAFE	SAFE	MED						
Wes & Mandi	ELIM	OUT							
Vinny & Sarah	SAFE	DQ							
Nate & Priscilla	OUT								

Competition
The team won the competition
The team did not win the final challenge
The team won the "Power Couple" mission and put another team into the Dome
The team was not selected to go into the Dome
The team won in the Dome
The team lost in the Dome and was eliminated
The team won the "Power Couple" mission and put another team into the Dome, but one contestant's actions later disqualified the team from the competition
A contestant was removed from the competition due to medical reasons, so his/her partner was also eliminated

== Episodes ==
No. overall	No. in season	Title	Original release date	US viewers (millions)
271	1	"Love Is A Battlefield"	January 25, 2012	1.91
272	2	"What's Love Got to Do With It?"	February 1, 2012	2.29
273	3	"Where Did Our Love Go?"	February 8, 2012	1.91
274	4	"Love the Way You Lie"	February 15, 2012	1.94
275	5	"Crazy in Love"	February 22, 2012	1.99
276	6	"Tainted Love"	February 29, 2012	1.90
277	7	"Love and Marriage"	March 7, 2012	1.82
278	8	"On the Wings of Love"	March 14, 2012	1.81
279	9	"Will You Still Love Me Tomorrow?"	March 21, 2012	1.81
280	10	"I Will Always Love You"	March 28, 2012	1.99

=== Reunion special ===
The season concluded with the reunion special on April 4, 2012, which was hosted by Mike "The Miz" Mizanin after a seven-year-long absence from The Challenge. The cast members who attended the reunion were: Johnny, Camila, CT, Diem, Ty, Emily, Mark, Robin, Dunbar, Paula, Rachel and Aneesa.

== Controversy ==
During this season of The Challenge, former The Real World: D.C. cast mates Emily Schromm and Ty Ruff were partnered together. During the 7th episode, which aired on March 7, 2012, Schromm appeared in blackface before the entire house of cast mates by smearing her face in Nutella, mocking Ruff, who is African American, directly in front of him. Camila Nakagawa, originally from Spring Break Challenge, was involved in the incident as well mocking Paula Meronek, Ruff's flirtatious partner on the show. After the show's cast mates were all seen disturbed by Schromm's actions, Schromm would later defend herself by claiming unawareness to blackface as a result of a sheltered childhood; this claim is questionable, however, considering Schromm brought up racism before presenting herself to the rest of the cast mates in blackface, at which point Nagakawa assured her that such actions would not be racist. Schromm is, however, told the action is racist by Ty in the midst of taunting him, before continuing on with it. Despite revelation of its racist history from all the cast mates, Nakagawa is seen complaining to all the cast mates having no sense of humor and being too sensitive. She also stated that Ruff was just offended out of jealousy despite the fact that it was Schromm who was discontented with Ruff's flirtatious relationship with Meronek. After being confronted on the issue by Ruff and Aneesa Ferreira on the season's Reunion special, Schromm made a tearful apology. She also expressed regret for taking advice from Nakagawa, making the point that Nakagawa isn't even from America but Brazil.
