= Diem Brown =

American television personality (1980-2014)

- Born: Danielle Michelle Brown; June 12, 1980; Germany
- Died: November 14, 2014 (aged 34); New York, United States
- Cause of death: Ovarian cancer
- Education: Florida State University
- Occupation: Television personality
- Years active: 2005–2014

Danielle Michelle "Diem" Brown^{[3]} (June 12, 1980 – November 14, 2014) was an American television personality, philanthropist, and entertainment reporter. She was best known as a recurring cast member on the MTV reality television series The Challenge. She also founded MedGift, a web-based advocacy service that provides a gift registry for patients and support pages to both people experiencing illnesses and their caregivers. Before her family settled in the United States, Diem and family moved frequently due to her father’s Army postings. Diem spent a significant amount of her pre-high school childhood in Baumholder, Germany. She attended high school in Roswell, Georgia and obtained her bachelor's degree in communications from Florida State University. She was a member of Delta Gamma sorority.

Since debuting on Real World/Road Rules Challenge: Fresh Meat in 2006, Brown competed in seven additional Challenges. In her debut challenge, filmed in November 2005, she revealed that she had been diagnosed with ovarian cancer, to the surprise of both the cast and the production company. Her final season of The Challenge, Battle of the Exes II, aired in early 2015.

== Reality television appearances ==
Fresh Meat was the twelfth season of Real World/Road Rules Challenge. Filmed in Australia, it featured two-player teams; each team had an alumnus of The Real World or Road Rules partnered with a newcomer to The Challenge (collectively known as "Fresh Meat") who was never part of one of the two aforementioned series. Brown was partnered with Road Rules alumnus Derrick Kosinski, and the pair finished in fourth place in the competition. Brown, who was just completing her treatment for cancer, went on to compete in The Duel. She took off her wig during one of the competitions, and this has been viewed as one of the most memorable and touching Challenge moments.

== Journalism ==
Brown was an entertainment reporter and worked for the Associated Press, Sky Living, and Foxnews.com. She also blogged about her experiences battling cancer and thoughts on The Challenge for People.com and hosted the MTV.com special Surviving Cancer.

== MedGift ==
The website MedGift was the brainchild of Diem. MedGift was a non-profit, web-based application that seeks to connect those in need with those who care. MedGift's objective is to help patients obtain support from family and friends while in treatment. She was also a patient advocate, speaking and appearing on numerous television and online shows and conferences. Brown took part in the first Stand Up to Cancer telethon as well as other charitable efforts such as MTV's Restore the Shore telethon for Hurricane Sandy. She was chosen as one of the initial 100 groundbreaking women to be profiled on MAKERS.com in 2012. MedGift discontinued operations on December 1, 2022.

== Personal life ==
Brown dated fellow Challenge castmember Chris "CT" Tamburello for over a year and a half after meeting on The Duel in 2006. Brown credited Tamburello for playing a role in her remission recovery and giving her confidence. The couple competed on the same team on The Gauntlet III and were featured on the MTV documentary show MADE, on which Brown aspired to learn how to salsa dance to regain her confidence. Following their split, Brown and Tamburello competed on The Duel II as well as a team on Battle of the Exes and The Challenge: Battle of the Exes II — they were the runners-up in the final of the original Exes.

== Final years and death ==
In June 2012, after six years of remission, Brown's ovarian cancer returned. She delayed treatment to harvest eggs before undergoing surgery to remove her ovary and receiving chemotherapy treatments. In an on-air interview with Brown, Dr. Drew Pinsky characterized the choice to delay treatment as "risky." In 2013, Brown's cancer once again went into remission. Brown ended chemotherapy in February 2013, and later competed in her seventh Challenge season, Rivals II, because she was told by doctors during her second bout with cancer that "seeing 2013 was not that likely." Brown and her rival partner Aneesa Ferreira finished in fourth place.

Brown was diagnosed with cancer for a third time in June 2014, but initially shared this information with only close friends. Two months later (August 2014), while filming her eighth and final Challenge competition, Battle of the Exes II in Panama, Brown collapsed on set, and was immediately airlifted to a New York hospital, where doctors performed emergency surgery. Though it was widely reported that she was diagnosed with colon cancer, Brown stated that her ovarian cancer had metastasized to her colon and stomach. Brown died on November 14, 2014. She spent her final hours in the company of friends and family.

Shortly after her death, it was revealed that Brown's age had been misrepresented to the public. Her family supported the false information by including an incorrect age on programs distributed at her funeral, but later her sister was quoted in a People magazine article about the true facts as saying that Brown had felt that many years of her life were taken from her due to cancer and treatments, and that deducting two years was a response to those circumstances. Some media headlines and reports corrected her reported age at the time of her death in response to the later information.

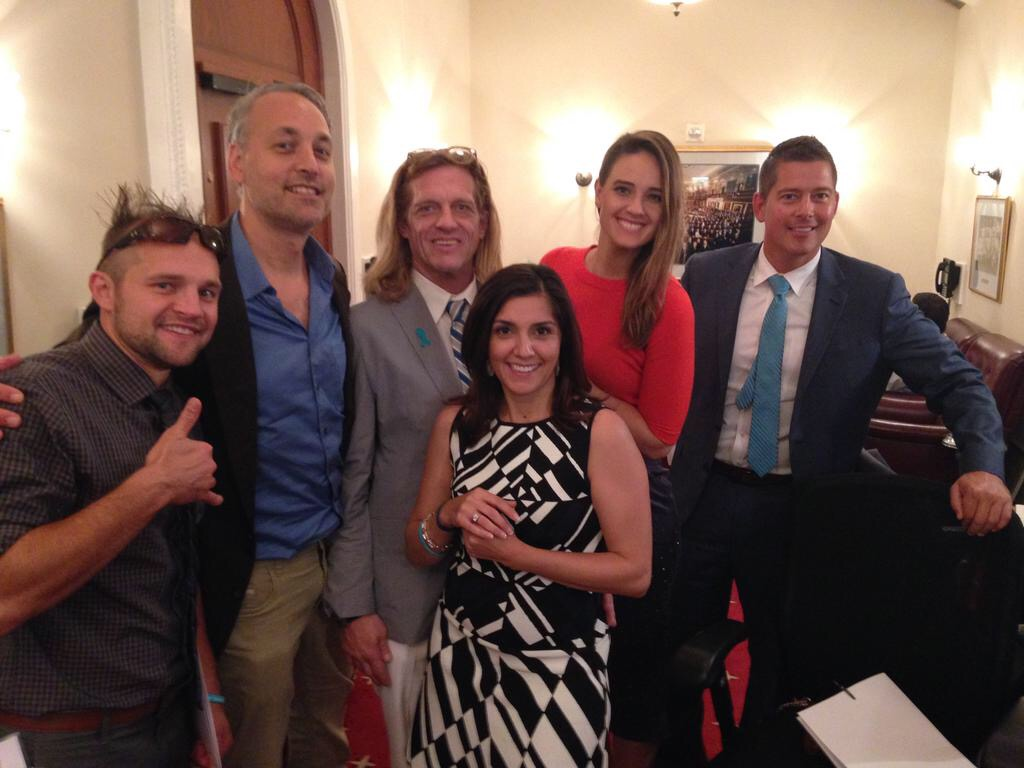
US Congressman Sean Duffy and various MTV alumni at the launch of Congressional Ovarian Cancer Caucus.

== Legacy ==
In 2015, former The Challenge contestant and United States Representative Sean Duffy of Wisconsin, started the Ovarian Cancer Caucus alongside Representative Rosa DeLauro of Connecticut, an ovarian cancer survivor. In attendance were several other contestants from the series, who came to honor Brown, whose death Duffy said "touched our MTV reality-TV family." In attendance were Duffy along with his wife Rachel Campos-Duffy and The Real World: San Francisco castmate David Rainey, Norman Korpi (The Real World: New York), Derrick Kosinski (Road Rules: X-Treme and Brown's Fresh Meat partner), and Laurel Stucky (The Challenge: Fresh Meat II).
