= The Challenge: Fresh Meat II =

19th season of the reality television series

Fresh Meat II
- Season 19
- Presented by: T. J. Lavin
- No. of contestants: 26
- Winners: Landon Lueck; Carley Johnson
- Location: Whistler, British Columbia, Canada
- No. of episodes: 12 (Special & Reunion Included)

Release
- Original network: MTV
- Original release: April 7 – June 9, 2010

Season chronology
- ← Previous; The Ruins Next → Cutthroat

The Challenge: Fresh Meat II is the 19th season of the MTV reality game show The Challenge and is the sequel to the show's 12th season, Fresh Meat. Continuing with the precursor's advent of original contestants, Fresh Meat II also introduced a slew of previously unknown contestants who had never appeared on either The Real World or Road Rules.

Filmed in Whistler, British Columbia, Fresh Meat II featured two-player teams; each team had an alumnus of The Real World, Road Rules or the original Fresh Meat, partnered with a newcomer of the opposite gender (collectively known as "Fresh Meat"). A "Meet the Meat" special premiered on March 31, 2010. The season premiered on April 7, 2010, and concluded on June 9, 2010, with the reunion show. Fresh Meat II marked the second time in which the show was renamed, no longer using Real World/Road Rules as the main title, but simply The Challenge, though host T. J. Lavin used "Real World/Road Rules Challenge" on the first episode in speaking to the contestants.

== Format ==
Fresh Meat II follows the same format as the original Fresh Meat season. The only difference in format is that the teams do not participate in a follow-up challenge prior to the Exile elimination. Therefore, the teams nominated for Exile do not have a chance to win a pardon and replace themselves with a non-winning team from the previous mission, as was the case in original Fresh Meat.

At the end of the season, four teams will compete in the final challenge. First-place wins $200,000, second-place wins $60,000, third-place wins $40,000 and fourth-place wins nothing.

== Contestants ==
Alumni	Original season	Fresh Meat	Age	Hometown	Finish
Landon Lueck	The Real World: Philadelphia	Carley Johnson	25	Las Vegas, Nevada	Winners
Kenny Santucci	Real World/Road Rules Challenge: Fresh Meat	Laurel Stucky	24	Detroit, Michigan	Runners-up
Jillian Zoboroski	Road Rules: X-Treme	Pete Connolly	21	Wellesley, Massachusetts	Third place
Jenn Grijalva	The Real World: Denver	Noor Jehangir	24	Austin, Texas	Fourth place
Ryan Kehoe	Real World/Road Rules Challenge: Fresh Meat	Theresa Gonzalez	24	Milwaukee, Wisconsin	Episode 10
Evelyn Smith (Note: At the end of the draft selections, Fresh Meat II contestant Luke Wolfe was temporarily left without a partner from the alumni, because original contestant Jonna Mannion (from The Real World: Cancun) was unable to make it into the country due to a lost passport prior to the departure. Evelyn Smith was brought in as a last-minute replacement, automatically making her Luke's partner.)	Real World/Road Rules Challenge: Fresh Meat	Luke Wolfe	22	Eugene, Oregon	Episode 9 (Note: Evelyn & Luke were the first to the finish line in this Exile. However, they skipped the last puzzle - which awarded a 5 minute time credit. Landon & Carley completed the puzzle and finished within 5 minutes of Evelyn & Luke. Accounting for the time credit, Landon & Carley had the faster time and won the Exile Challenge, eliminating Evelyn & Luke.)
Wes Bergmann	The Real World: Austin	Mandi Moyer	21	Portland, Oregon	Episode 7
CJ Koegel	The Real World: Cancun	Sydney Walker	21	Washington, D.C.	Episode 6
Danny Jamieson	The Real World: Austin	Sandy Kang	22	Tacoma, Washington	Episode 5
Katelynn Cusanelli	The Real World: Brooklyn	Brandon Nelson	25	Jacksonville, Arkansas	Episode 4 (Note: No Exile was held in Episode 4. CJ & Sydney were selected for Exile, but did not have to compete, because the team that was chosen to face them — Katelynn & Brandon — was disqualified after Brandon consumed alcohol prior to the Exile. It had been implied, though, that Katelynn would have been physically incapable of competing after she suffered a severe knee injury during the "King Of The Wall" challenge.)
Paula Meronek	The Real World: Key West	Jeff Barr	25	Dallas, Texas	Episode 3
Sarah Rice	The Real World: Brooklyn	Vinny Foti	25	Boston, Massachusetts	Episode 2
Darrell Taylor	Road Rules: Campus Crawl	Cara Maria Sorbello	23	Methuen, Massachusetts	Episode 1

^1 Age at the time of filming.

=== Stats ===
Each of the 13 Fresh Meat II cast members participated in a combine, testing their strength, stamina, and mental ability. The alumni used the stats from each player's obstacle course performance to determine their partner.

The multi-challenge obstacle course included:

- Pull-ups
- 40-yard dash
- Vertical leap
- An obstacle course consisting of a series of wall climbs, a Brainteaser puzzle, and a rope climb

Other combine activities were completed (based on the stat sheets shown in the opening episode), but these activities as well as everyone's stats, were not shown in full.

Fresh Meat	Pull-ups	Vertical leap	40-yard Dash	Obstacle course
Brandon Drake Nelson	10	3'6"	5.62 sec	3 min 09 sec
Cara Maria Sorbello	6	2'6"	6.13 sec	6 min 51 sec
Carley Johnson	0	2'4"	7.15 sec	DQ
Jeff Barr	19	3'9"	5.63 sec	5 min 19 sec
Laurel Stucky	2	3'1"	6.42 sec	3 min 00 sec
Luke Wolfe	15	3'8"	5.44 sec	2 min 47 sec
Mandi Moyer	0	1'6"	7.38 sec	DQ
Noor Jehangir	21	3'7"	4.84 sec	2 min 30 sec
Pete Connolly	7	3'6"	5.50 sec	3 min 50 sec
Sandy Kang	0	2'7"	6.83 sec	4 min 27 sec
Sydney Walker	0	2'6"	6.57 sec	5 min 40 sec
Theresa Gonzalez	0	2'2"	6.56 sec	6 min 45 sec
Vinny Foti	11	4'0"	5.53 sec	DQ

=== Draft selections ===
Pick #	Alumni	Draft pick	Team
1	Darrell Taylor	Cara Maria Sorbello	Darrell & Cara Maria
2	Jenn Grijalva	Noor Jehangir	Jenn & Noor
3	Kenny Santucci	Laurel Stucky	Kenny & Laurel
4	Danny Jamieson	Sandy Kang	Danny & Sandy
5	Wes Bergmann	Mandi Moyer	Wes & Mandi
6	Ryan Kehoe	Theresa Gonzalez	Ryan & Theresa
7	CJ Koegel	Sydney Walker	CJ & Sydney
8	Landon Lueck	Carley Johnson	Landon & Carley
9	Paula Meronek	Jeff Barr	Paula & Jeff
10	Sarah Rice	Vinny Foti	Sarah & Vinny
11	Jillian Zoboroski	Pete Connolly	Jillian & Pete
12	Katelynn Cusanelli	Brandon Drake Nelson	Katelynn & Brandon
13	Evelyn Smith	Luke Wolfe	Evelyn & Luke

== Gameplay ==
=== Challenge games ===
- Dirty Mouth: Players have to transfer oversize balls out of a mud pit while blindfolded. The challenge is played in multiple rounds, alternating between male and female. There are fewer balls than players, and the blindfolded players are guided by their partners on the sidelines as to where a ball is located, as well as if they can steal a ball from an opposing player. If a player fails to get out of the pit with a ball before the end of a round, that player, along with their partner, is eliminated from the remainder of the challenge. The last player remaining who transfers a ball out of the mud pit wins the challenge for their team.
  - Winners: Kenny & Laurel
- I'll Be There For You: Teams have to pick up a weighted chest that is chained to a platform submerged 15 feet below water. Once a player swims down to pick up the chest, the chest cannot touch the platform, and their teammate can swim down to relieve their partner if he/she needs to take a breath above the water. If the chest drops down to the platform, or if the heads of both team members go above the water, the team's time is stopped. The two teams that hold the chest above the platform for the longest time without both players going above the water battle it out in a final round, and the team that wins the final round wins the challenge.
  - Winners: Landon & Carley
- Water Logged: Teams have to advance from one end of a platform to another that is suspended high above water. Each player has to swing on a series of logs that is hanging from the base of the platform. Each log is of a different length. A team is disqualified if one or both players falls into the water. The team that advances to the end of the platform in the fastest time wins.
  - Winners: Kenny & Laurel
- King Of The Wall: Teams have to swim 30 yards from a floating dock to a slippery climbing wall that is positioned at a 45° angle. The team that climbs to the top of the wall and rings a bell in the fastest time wins.
  - Winners: Kenny & Laurel
- Drop Out: Teams have to climb up a swivel rope ladder that leads to a platform that is suspended 30 feet above water. After reaching the platform, players have to run, jump and hang onto a large canvas bag that is hanging from above. Both players from each team must hang onto the bag simultaneously for five seconds to stop the team time. If one or both players falls into the water, they must start over, but the timer does not stop. A team is disqualified if they do not complete the challenge within a 15-minute time limit. The team with the fastest time wins.
  - Winners: Kenny & Laurel
- Turn Style: Two giant logs are perpendicularly placed in the center of a "turnstyle," in the shape of a "X," and teams have to push the logs 180° from start to finish. However, other teams try to do the same — with the other log in the opposite direction, making it difficult for any team to push the logs. The challenge is played in multiple rounds — tournament-style, with two teams per log on opposite sides. The team that wins the final round wins the challenge.
  - Winners: Jillian & Pete
- Airheads: Teams have to slide down a 200-foot ramp that launches players into a lake. Each team has to swim to the middle of the lake, where there is a floating log holding up a sign containing a diagram of a puzzle. Each team has to memorize the diagram, then swim back to shore to solve a giant puzzle (resembling a Tetris board) that duplicates the diagram of the sign in the middle of the lake. Each team can swim to and from the diagram and the shore as many times as they need to solve the puzzle. The team that solves the puzzle in the fastest time wins.
  - Winners: Landon & Carley
- Wrecking Ball: Teams have to build an Inukshuk puzzle within a large circular area. The female team member is hanging by a rope, upside down from a platform, thus interfering with the building of the puzzle. The male team member has to swing their female partner around and away from the center in order to collect the puzzle pieces, and keep the female partner from knocking over the pieces. The puzzle pieces have to stand for at least five seconds before the team time is stopped. The team that builds the Inukshuk puzzle in the fastest time wins.
  - Winners: Jenn & Noor
- Obstacle: Teams have to race through an obstacle course that is spread out over half a mile within a field. The course contains ten various obstacles, in which teams have to race through, over and around them as fast as possible. The tenth and final obstacle is "Defender," in which opposing players have to prevent players of the same gender from advancing from one end of a mud pit to another, where the finish line is located. The team that advances through the entire course in the fastest time wins and advances to the final challenge, while the two teams (out of five) that finish in the bottom two automatically go to Exile.
  - Winners: Kenny & Laurel

=== Exiles ===
Note: Each Exile elimination alternated between "Lost & Found" and "Weight For Me" in the first seven episodes (though "Weight For Me" was not played in Episode 4), while "Weight For Me: Blackout" was played in both Episodes 8 and 9.

- Lost & Found: Teams are given a map and must carry two weighted backpacks while running through a course in the woods. Along the way they must complete several puzzles. The first team to reach the finish line wins.
  - Played by: Darrell & Cara Maria vs. Jillian & Pete, Evelyn & Luke vs. Paula & Jeff, Danny & Sandy vs. Jillian & Pete, Evelyn & Luke vs. Wes & Mandi
- Weight For Me: Teams must race up a mountain and complete various brain teaser puzzles. Along the way, they must carry weight of 100 pounds on their shoulders, distributed whichever way they want.
  - Played by: Kenny & Laurel vs. Sarah & Vinny, CJ & Sydney vs. Landon & Carley
- Weight For Me: Blackout: The exile is played the same as Weight For Me, but played at nighttime. Instead of 100 pounds, the teams must carry around 150 pounds of weight distributed in whichever way they want.
  - Played by: Evelyn & Luke vs. Landon & Carley, Jenn & Noor vs. Ryan & Theresa

=== Final challenge ===
First, each team must paddle a canoe across a giant lake to a puzzle. Once they finish that, they can head to a helicopter. Reaching the helicopter first is very important because it determines the penalty that teams will have to take before they can continue on to the second part of the challenge. The team that wins the first phase gets a two-minute headstart, the second-place finisher gets a one-minute headstart while the third-place finisher gets a 30-second headstart. The second phase of the challenge starts with a giant Sudoku puzzle, followed by a mountain bike ride except that the two bikes are tied together with a rope so the teammates have to stay together. After a puzzle that involves carrying color-coded logs to match a diagram, the teams must climb a very steep mountain, carrying a heavy bag. Once completed with a numbered puzzle, they're given helmets and an ice axe and have to climb the top of the mountain. The first team to climb up the mountain and reach the flag, wins Fresh Meat II.

- Winners: Landon & Carley (won $200,000)
- Second place: Kenny & Laurel (won $60,000)
- Third place: Jillian & Pete (won $40,000)
- Fourth place: Jenn & Noor

== Game summary ==
Episode		Winners	Exile contestants		Exile game	Exile outcome	
#	Challenge	Winners	Winner's pick	Voted in	Exile game	Winners	Eliminated
1	Dirty Mouth	Kenny & Laurel	Darrell & Cara Maria	Jillian & Pete	Lost & Found	Jillian & Pete	Darrell & Cara Maria
2	I'll Be There For You	Landon & Carley	Kenny & Laurel	Sarah & Vinny	Weight For Me	Kenny & Laurel	Sarah & Vinny
3	Water Logged	Kenny & Laurel	Evelyn & Luke	Paula & Jeff	Lost & Found	Evelyn & Luke	Paula & Jeff
4	King Of The Wall	Kenny & Laurel	CJ & Sydney	Katelynn & Brandon	—N/a		
5	Drop Out	Kenny & Laurel	Danny & Sandy	Jillian & Pete	Lost & Found	Jillian & Pete	Danny & Sandy
6	Turn Style	Jillian & Pete	Landon & Carley	CJ & Sydney	Weight For Me	Landon & Carley	CJ & Sydney
7	Airheads	Landon & Carley	Wes & Mandi	Evelyn & Luke	Lost & Found	Evelyn & Luke	Wes & Mandi
8/9	Wrecking Ball	Jenn & Noor	Evelyn & Luke	Landon & Carley	Weight For Me: Black Out	Landon & Carley	Evelyn & Luke
9/10	Obstacle	Kenny & Laurel	Jenn & Noor vs. Ryan & Theresa (Note: Jenn & Noor and Ryan & Theresa were automatically sent to Exile, after they placed in the bottom two in the "Obstacle" challenge. The top three finishers were safe from Exile and automatically in the final challenge.)		Weight For Me: Black Out	Jenn & Noor	Ryan & Theresa
10	Final Challenge	Landon & Carley	2nd place: Kenny & Laurel; 3rd place: Jillian & Pete; 4th place: Jenn & Noor				

=== Elimination progress ===
Teams	Challenges									
Teams	1	2	3	4	5	6	7	8/9	9/10	Finale
Landon & Carley	SAFE	WIN	SAFE	SAFE	SAFE	ELIM	WIN	ELIM	SAFE	WINNERS
Kenny & Laurel	WIN	ELIM	WIN	WIN	WIN	SAFE	SAFE	SAFE	WIN	SECOND
Jillian & Pete	ELIM	SAFE	SAFE	SAFE	ELIM	WIN	SAFE	SAFE	SAFE	THIRD
Jenn & Noor	SAFE	SAFE	SAFE	SAFE	SAFE	SAFE	SAFE	WIN	ELIM	FOURTH
Ryan & Theresa	SAFE	SAFE	SAFE	SAFE	SAFE	SAFE	SAFE	SAFE	OUT	
Evelyn & Luke	SAFE	SAFE	ELIM	SAFE	SAFE	SAFE	ELIM	OUT		
Wes & Mandi	SAFE	SAFE	SAFE	SAFE	SAFE	SAFE	OUT			
CJ & Sydney	SAFE	SAFE	SAFE	SAVE	SAFE	OUT				
Danny & Sandy	SAFE	SAFE	SAFE	SAFE	OUT					
Katelynn & Brandon	SAFE	SAFE	SAFE	DQ						
Paula & Jeff	SAFE	SAFE	OUT							
Sarah & Vinny	SAFE	OUT								
Darrell & Cara Maria	OUT									

The team won the competition
The team did not win the final challenge, but was awarded a monetary prize
The team did not win the final challenge and was not awarded a monetary prize
The team won the challenge, and was safe from Exile
The team won the Exile
The team was selected for Exile, but did not have to compete
The team did not win the challenge, but was safe from Exile
The team lost the Exile and was eliminated
The team was disqualified from the competition

=== Voting progress ===
Voted into the Exile	Darrell & Cara Maria; 1 of 1 votes	Kenny & Laurel; 1 of 1 votes	Evelyn & Luke; 1 of 1 votes	CJ & Sydney; 1 of 1 votes	Danny & Sandy; 1 of 1 votes	Landon & Carley; 1 of 1 votes	Wes & Mandi; 1 of 1 votes	Evelyn & Luke; 1 of 1 votes
Voted into the Exile	Jillian & Pete; 20 of 20 votes	Sarah & Vinny; 11 of 20 votes	Paula & Jeff; 6 of 10 votes	Katelynn & Brandon; 14 of 14 votes	Jillian & Pete; 8 of 8 votes	CJ & Sydney; 10 of 10 votes	Evelyn & Luke; 6 of 8 votes	Landon & Carley; 6 of 8 votes
Voter	Episode							
Voter	1	2	3	4	5	6	7	8
Landon	Jillian & Pete	Kenny & Laurel	Paula & Jeff	Katelynn & Brandon	Jillian & Pete	Ineligible	Wes & Mandi	Jillian & Pete
Carley	Jillian & Pete	Kenny & Laurel	Paula & Jeff	Katelynn & Brandon	Jillian & Pete	Ineligible	Wes & Mandi	Jillian & Pete
Kenny	Darrell & Cara Maria	Ineligible	Evelyn & Luke	CJ & Sydney	Danny & Sandy	CJ & Sydney	Evelyn & Luke	Landon & Carley
Laurel	Darrell & Cara Maria	Ineligible	Evelyn & Luke	CJ & Sydney	Danny & Sandy	CJ & Sydney	Evelyn & Luke	Landon & Carley
Jillian	Unknown	Wes & Mandi	Unknown	Katelynn & Brandon	Unknown	Landon & Carley	Evelyn & Luke	Landon & Carley
Pete	Unknown	Sarah & Vinny	Unknown	Katelynn & Brandon	Unknown	Landon & Carley	Evelyn & Luke	Landon & Carley
Jenn	Jillian & Pete	Wes & Mandi	Wes & Mandi	Katelynn & Brandon	Unknown	CJ & Sydney	Unknown	Evelyn & Luke
Noor	Jillian & Pete	Jillian & Pete	Wes & Mandi	Katelynn & Brandon	Unknown	CJ & Sydney	Unknown	Evelyn & Luke
Ryan	Jillian & Pete	Wes & Mandi	Unknown	Katelynn & Brandon	Unknown	CJ & Sydney	Evelyn & Luke	Landon & Carley
Theresa	Jillian & Pete	Katelynn & Brandon	Unknown	Katelynn & Brandon	Unknown	CJ & Sydney	Evelyn & Luke	Landon & Carley
Evelyn	Jillian & Pete	Sarah & Vinny	Ineligible	Katelynn & Brandon	Jillian & Pete	CJ & Sydney	Jillian & Pete	Ineligible
Luke	Jillian & Pete	Sarah & Vinny	Ineligible	Katelynn & Brandon	Jillian & Pete	CJ & Sydney	Jillian & Pete	Ineligible
Wes	Jillian & Pete	Sarah & Vinny	Paula & Jeff	Katelynn & Brandon	Jillian & Pete	CJ & Sydney	Ineligible	
Mandi	Jillian & Pete	Sarah & Vinny	Paula & Jeff	Katelynn & Brandon	Jillian & Pete	CJ & Sydney	Ineligible	
CJ	Jillian & Pete	Sarah & Vinny	Paula & Jeff	Ineligible	Jillian & Pete	Unknown		
Sydney	Jillian & Pete	Sarah & Vinny	Paula & Jeff	Ineligible	Jillian & Pete	Unknown		
Danny	Jillian & Pete	Sarah & Vinny	Unknown	Katelynn & Brandon	Ineligible			
Sandy	Jillian & Pete	Sarah & Vinny	Unknown	Katelynn & Brandon	Ineligible			
Katelynn	Jillian & Pete	Sarah & Vinny	Unknown	Unknown				
Brandon	Jillian & Pete	Sarah & Vinny	Unknown	Unknown				
Paula	Jillian & Pete	Wes & Mandi	Landon & Carley					
Jeff	Jillian & Pete	Wes & Mandi	Landon & Carley					
Sarah	Jillian & Pete	Wes & Mandi						
Vinny	Jillian & Pete	Wes & Mandi						
Darrell	Ineligible							
Cara Maria	Ineligible							

== Teams ==
Turn Style (Ep. 6)
Team Kenny & Laurel	Team Ryan & Theresa	Team Jenn & Noor	Team Wes & Mandi
Kenny & Laurel	Ryan & Theresa	Jenn & Noor	Wes & Mandi
Jillian & Pete	Landon & Carley	Evelyn & Luke	CJ & Sydney

== Episodes ==
No. overall	No. in season	Title	Original release date	US viewers (millions)
241	1	"Nice to Meat You"	April 7, 2010	1.39
242	2	"Meating of the Minds"	April 14, 2010	1.24
243	3	"Sloppy Ho's"	April 21, 2010	1.56
244	4	"Meats 'N Potatoes"	April 28, 2010	1.13
245	5	"Road Kill"	May 5, 2010	1.15
246	6	"Checkmeat!"	May 12, 2010	1.06
247	7	"Trimming The Fat"	May 19, 2010	1.20
248	8	"Spoiled Rotten Meat"	May 26, 2010	0.93
249	9	"All U Can Eat Stakes"	June 2, 2010	1.11
250	10	"Well Done, Meat"	June 9, 2010	1.16

=== Reunion special ===
The Challenge: Fresh Meat II Reunion was aired after the season finale and was hosted by Maria Menounos on June 9, 2010. The cast members who attended the reunion were: Kenny, Wes, Mandi, Carley, Landon, Jenn, Pete, Theresa, Ryan, Ev, Laurel, Noor, Danny and Jillian. A preview for The Real World: New Orleans is shown, thus ending another challenge reunion.

== After filming ==
In 2015, Carley Johnson married Brandon Mundt in Iceland. Together they have one child.

On December 5, 2015, Theresa González and T. J. Jones welcomed their daughter, Easton Kaia, followed by their first son, Maddox, in April 2019. The couple's second daughter, Layla Capri, was born on July 19, 2021.

In 2017, Laurel Stucky appeared on MTV's Fear Factor, where she was paired with Aneesa Ferreira. In 2019, she appeared on the fourth season of Ex on the Beach with former girlfriend Nicole Zanatta from Real World: Skeletons. The two first met on season 29 of The Challenge. In 2020, she revealed she was a victim of sexual assault at the age of 21.

In 2018, Cara Maria Sorbello appeared on Fear Factor alongside Chris Tamburello. In the same year, she also appeared on How Far Is Tattoo Far? with her boyfriend Paulie Calafiore. In 2019, Sorbello appeared on Game of Clones.

In 2018, Vinny Foti was hospitalized after suffering heart failure. He is married to Krista Foti and they have two daughters.

Noor Jehangir competed on the second season of Holey Moley.

=== Subsequent seasons of The Challenge ===
Cast member	Subsequent seasons of The Challenge	Other appearances
Brandon Nelson	Cutthroat (2010), Rivals, Battle of the Seasons (2012), Free Agents, Battle of the Eras	The Challenge: All Stars (season 4)
Cara Maria Sorbello	Cutthroat, Rivals, Battle of the Exes, Battle of the Seasons (2012), Rivals II, Free Agents, Battle of the Bloodlines, Invasion of the Champions, XXX: Dirty 30, Vendettas, Final Reckoning, War of the Worlds, War of the Worlds 2, Battle of the Eras, Vets & New Threats, Cutthroat (2026)	The Challenge: Champs vs. Pros, The Challenge: All Stars (season 4)
Carley Johnson	—N/a	—N/a
Jeff Barr	—N/a	—N/a
Laurel Stucky	Cutthroat (2010), Rivals, Free Agents, Invasion of the Champions, War of the Worlds 2, Ride or Dies, Battle of the Eras	The Challenge: All Stars (season 4)
Luke Wolfe	Cutthroat (2010)	—N/a
Mandi Moyer	Cutthroat (2010), Rivals, Battle of the Exes	—N/a
Noor Jehangir	—N/a	—N/a
Pete Connolly	—N/a	—N/a
Sandy Kang	—N/a	—N/a
Sydney Walker	—N/a	—N/a
Theresa Gonzalez	Cutthroat (2010), Rivals, Rivals II, Free Agents, Battle of the Exes II, Double Agents	—N/a
Vinny Foti	Cutthroat (2010), Battle of the Exes	—N/a

Note: Laurel made an appearance on Vendettas and Battle for a New Champion for an elimination. Cara Maria also appeared on Battle for a New Champion for an elimination.
