= The Real World: San Diego (2011 season) =

Coordinates: 32°48′25″N 117°15′48″W

- Season 26
- The cast of The Real World: San Diego
- Starring: Ashley Kelsey; Frank Sweeney; Nate Stodghill; Priscilla Mendez; Sam McGinn; Zach Nichols; Alexandra Govere
- No. of episodes: 12

Release
- Original network: MTV
- Original release: September 28 – December 21, 2011

Season chronology
- ← Previous; The Real World: Las Vegas Next → The Real World: St. Thomas

The Real World: San Diego is the twenty-sixth season of MTV's reality television series The Real World, which focuses on a group of diverse strangers living together for several months in a different city each season, as cameras follow their lives and interpersonal relationships. It is the sixth season of The Real World to be filmed in the West Coast region of the United States, specifically in California after The Real World: Hollywood.

The season featured a cast of seven people who lived in a house located in the La Jolla community of San Diego. It is the sixth season to take place in a city that had hosted a previous season, as the show's fourteenth season was set in San Diego in 2004. It is also the fifth season to be located in California. San Diego was first reported as the location for the 26th season when a moving company posted pictures of the house on their blog in May 2011, and said it would be used for the series. Production began from June to September 9, 2011 and the season premiered on September 28 of that year, consisting of 12 episodes.

== Assignment ==
Most seasons of The Real World, beginning with its fifth season, have included the assignment of a season-long group job or task to the housemates, continued participation in which has been mandatory to remain part of the cast since the Back to New York season. This season, the cast works at the House of Blues.

== Residence ==
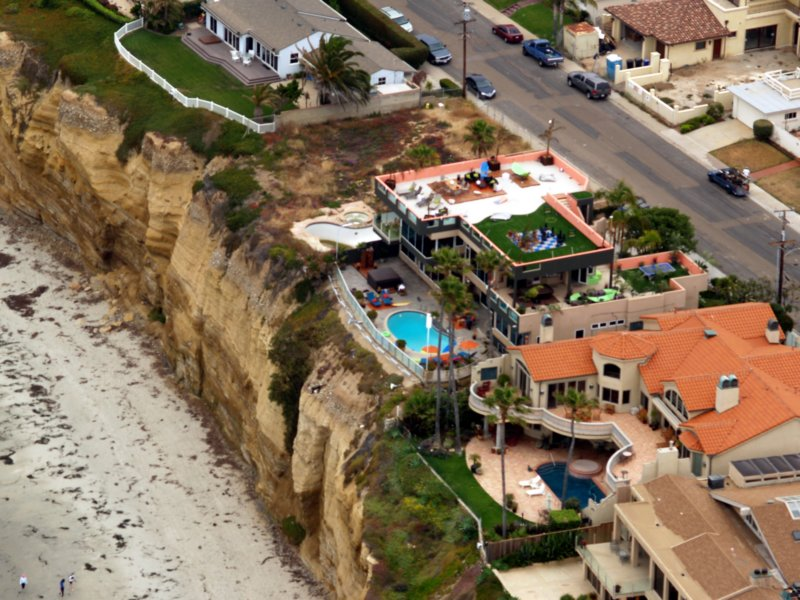
The La Jolla residence, seen in June 2011

The cast resided in a beach house at 5212 Chelsea Street in La Jolla, California, a neighborhood of San Diego, which belongs to an unnamed celebrity who vacated it for the production's use, and removed his belongings from the residence because he "didn't want any of his valuables destroyed by the Real World's notoriously wreckless [sic] cast members." The two story, eight-bedroom house features a large set living room, small pool, a patio overlooking the ocean, and a tennis court on the top deck.

== Cast ==
Cast member	Age^{1}	Hometown
Alexandra Govere	21	Los Angeles, California
Alexandra, who goes by "Alex," was raised in Zimbabwe, in a village with no electricity or running water. She relocated with her family to California. She is of Zimbabwean, French, and American Indian descent. Described by MTV as the most accomplished person to ever appear on the series, She studied calculus at age 10, graduated from high school at 14 and attended Stanford University at 15, studying civil engineering. She is an accomplished ballerina, competition gymnast, singer-songwriter and activist whose co-founding, with her younger sister, of the Kijana Project to support AIDS orphans resulted in a featured appearance in Elle magazine. She lives in Los Angeles with her musician boyfriend of eight months, Byron.
Ashley Kelsey	24	Winsted, Connecticut
Ashley, the oldest cast member, attended the University of Connecticut, where she majored in business. Ashley is also a model, with a profile on a website called Model Mayhem. She is extremely close to her mother, who is the only person she has ever lived with, underlining the new experience of living with six strangers. She hopes to do sideline reporting for the NFL. She prefers tall, athletic men, though she does not date often. She develops a romantic relationship with Zach, in part because, as she explains, they were both raised in a conservative environment, though Priscilla and Nate question the degree to which she grows dependent on Zach, to the exclusion of getting to know the rest of the cast.
Frank Sweeney	22	Canastota, New York
Described by MTV as a "whirlwind of emotions" and a "master of manipulation", Frank, who is nicknamed "Hurricane Frank", grew up in Upstate New York, and graduated from Middlebury College, where he majored in Spanish and molecular biology, and participated in track and hammer throwing. Frank is bisexual and on his 21st birthday, he began a gay relationship for the first time. He also enjoys partying to point of blacking out. A failed past relationship that left him vulnerable is recalled through his unrequited attraction to Alexandra. His conflict with his parents over his sexuality lead him to act belligerent and confrontational when drunk. He bonds with Sam in Episode 5, explaining that he never went to gay bars or wore gay pride paraphernalia before meeting her. His sexual identity brings him into conflict with Zach in Episode 5, though Frank grows closer to Zach and Ashley beginning in Episode 6, due to Frank's relationship with a man named Mike, whom Zach and Ashley believe brings out the best in Frank. Frank and Mike break up in Episode 9, however, due to Frank's infidelity, after which his rift with Ashley and Zach resumes.
Nate Stodghill	22	Grain Valley, Missouri
According to MTV, Nate appears to be a typical fratboy, was a class clown growing up, and was captain of the high school football and baseball teams and senior class president. He was spurred to become an advocate for suicide prevention after one of his friends committed suicide, an experience that he recalls painfully in Episode 4. Nate is a recent graduate of the Missouri University of Science and Technology, where he played football and earned a degree in nuclear engineering. According to MTV, he drinks heavily and engages in promiscuous sex, but considers his promiscuity and his inability to be faithful to any girlfriend he has ever had to be his best and worst trait. He intends to become CEO of a global energy conglomerate.
Priscilla Mendez	19	San Diego, California
Priscilla, who is of Mexican descent and the youngest cast member, graduated from West Hills High School a year early. Currently she is a student at the University of California, Davis, where she graduated with a degree in Psychology. She is currently pursuing a masters degree. She is best friends with her mother, who had her when she was 17, and with whom she discusses extremely intimate subjects. Her large family also includes a younger brother named Jordan a sister, and her grandparents. Mendez is very close with her family. Though described by MTV as "flirtatious", she has only been in one serious relationship, which ended badly and with unresolved issues that may be resolved during the season. In Episodes 7 and 8, Dylan, the boyfriend she broke up with a year ago, comes to visit, during which they try to define their relationship.
Sam McGinn	21	Chesapeake, Virginia
Samantha, who goes by "Sam", is a daughter of military parents and self-described "stud lesbian" whose sexuality initially strained her relationship with her mother, though this eventually improved. Characterized by MTV as a "girlfriend stealer", she was involved in a dramatic love triangle in high school that resulted in two girls being outed. She is passionate about gay rights, and performs as a drag king alter ego named Shawn Jade. She is in college studying to become a parole officer. Sam grows close to Nate, whom Frank describes as Sam's "big brother". Her father's 25-year career in the U.S. Navy provides an important context for her pride in Episode 6 when she sees military servicemen marching in San Diego's Gay Pride event for the first time following the abolition of Don't ask, don't tell. She has been hunting since she was nine years old.
Zach Nichols	23	Brighton, Michigan
Standing at 6'3, Zach played wide receiver at Northern Michigan University, where he graduated with a degree in sports science and exercise physiology. He formerly harbored dreams of playing for the NFL, but today supplements his semi-professional football career by working at a physical therapy clinic. He competes to get women, including older women, with his two best friends, who collectively call themselves "The Goon Squad". His pastimes include going to church and firing guns at shooting ranges, the latter of which he shares with Ashley, as they spend time together during the season. He is a self-described conservative who is taken aback at meeting Sam in the premiere, whose lifestyle choices are the "opposite" of his, though he develops a romantic relationship with Ashley, who was also raised in a conservative environment. He is against the inclusion of homosexuals in the military, and in Episode 5, refuses to participate in charity work during a gay pride parade in which gay service members march. Zach calls a family member who currently serves in the military and gets his advice on this issue. The family member tells Zach not to support gay service in the military. So Zach follows the advice of his family member. In that same episode, a rift forms between him and Sam and Frank after Zach makes a joke alluding to gay bashing to which the latter two take offense. He grows closer to Frank through Frank's relationship with a man named Mike, but when that relationship ends, the rift between the two housemates resumes. He nonetheless remains close with Sam through the remainder of their stay in the house.

^1 Age at time of filming

== Episodes ==
No. overall	No. in season	Title	Original release date	U.S. viewers (millions)
518	1	"First Impressions"	September 28, 2011	1.94
The cast assembles at the La Jolla house. Self-described conservative Zach is reluctant to share a room with lesbian Sam, whose lifestyle choices he says are "opposite" to his, and Nate expresses reservations about rooming with bisexual Frank. Ashley is attracted to Zach, and Nate to Priscilla, but despite returning Nate's kiss, Priscilla insists that she is not attracted to him, and their kiss was not mutual. Frank's unrequited attraction to Alexandra, and the trauma of a past failed relationship of his, leads him to become drunk and confrontational with a woman at a club who calls Sam a "faggot", and exhibit similar behavior with Alexandra that disturbs her.
519	2	"Danas, Derrieres, and Drama"	October 5, 2011	1.22
The cast divert themselves with surfing lessons, and in the case of Sam and Nate, pranks played on the others. Nate briefly sees two women, both named Dana, without success, while Ashley and Zach contemplate their mutual attraction. Frank apologizes to Alexandra for his behavior the other night, explaining his father's negative attitude toward his sexuality as an influence, but his belligerent behavior when drunk recurs.
520	3	"A Pig Walks Into a Gay Bar..."	October 12, 2011	1.49
When Frank romances a man that he brings home with him, the homophobic Nate reacts with aversion to this, leading to an explosive argument between him and a violent Frank, and following a discussion, the decision by Frank to seek counseling for his alcoholism.
521	4	"Hair Razing Arguments and Sticky Situations"	October 19, 2011	1.29
Frank begins going to therapy, though he continues to experience episodes of anger, as when Priscilla's attempt to cut his hair goes poorly. Nate goes to a gay bar to confront his homophobia. The difficulty of Alexandra and Byron's long-distance relationship is underscored by arguments they have over his lack of consideration for her when he visits. A group Fourth of July celebration with Priscilla's family causes Nate to painfully reflect upon his lost loved ones, and embark upon a suicide prevention campaign with two entrepreneurs.
522	5	"Over the Rainbow"	October 26, 2011	1.54
Priscilla expresses aversion to Ashley's attachment and deference to Zach as the latter two spend more time together. Sam reacts to learning that two of her best friends were severely injured in a car accident, which is exacerbated by a comment by Zach alluding to gay bashing that he intended as a joke, but which to both Sam and Frank take offense. Sam and Frank later bond over preparations for a local gay pride parade, at which the entire cast must work as part of their work assignment at the House of Blues, though Zach has reservations about participating in this and other LGBT-related activities.
523	6	"Pride and Prejudice"	November 2, 2011	1.42
Zach and Sam continue to struggle with his aversion to homosexuality, though he and Ashley are surprisingly brought closer to Frank after Frank falls for a man there named Michael, which Zach believes marks a transition from bisexuality to homosexuality for Frank. Echoing this, Frank's mother argues with him over the phone about his self-identifying to her as bisexual. Nate begins setting up his suicide prevention charity with a website called The Living Memoir, but Frank's skepticism about the commercial aspect of it leads him to ask Michael, who formerly ran a non-profit organization, to help out.
524	7	"It's My Party and I'll Bang If I Want To"	November 9, 2011	1.23
The musings about Zach and Ashley's still-platonic relationship on the part of the cast, particularly Sam, upset the conservative couple. The cast is made up to be zombies to promote the House of Blues at San Diego Comic-Con. Zach is admonished by his father for inappropriate behavior. Frank and Michael's talk about moving in together sparks Frank's fears. Priscilla is conflicted during a visit by Dylan, the boyfriend she broke up with a year ago, with whom she has not had closure. The cast celebrates Zach and Ashley's birthdays.
525	8	"Stolen Show, Stolen Hearts, Stolen Motorcycles"	November 16, 2011	1.34
The cast watches Alex perform in public for the first time with her band, Alex and the Hats. As Priscilla and Dylan struggle to rebuild and define their relationship, the rest of the cast plays a prank on Dylan that results in Dylan filing out a police report. The cast competes for a $500 prize as they promote the House of Blues at the Warped Tour. Though the money is coveted by Alex, whose cousin in Zimbabwe needs money for school, Nate, Ashley, Frank and Zach are confident that they will easily win it by working as a team. Nate is attracted to Michelle, the group's boss at the House of Blues.
526	9	"All the Wrong Moves"	November 30, 2011	1.12
Frank deals with the consequences of his infidelity to Mike, and later rebounds with a guy named Todd. Similarly, Nate romances both Michelle and a girl named Kristen, which later brings him into conflict with Michelle, and at a promotional event for The Living Memoir, Ashley reacts to seeing another woman grope Zach.
527	10	"Camp Out, Drag Out, Sing Out"	December 7, 2011	1.32
Ashley and Zach, who enjoyed Mike's company, are less than enthused about Frank's new relationship with Todd. This angers Frank, who directs his ire toward Ashley in order to avoid causing a greater rift with Zach, a choice that Ashley questions, while Nate feels that Ashley is too dependent on Zach, and has not tried to get the know the others. The cast goes on a camping trip. Sam performs locally as her drag king alter ego, Shawn Jade, while Alex gets to perform at the House of Blues.
528	11	"Tick, Tick, Cabo-oom!"	December 7, 2011	1.40
With two weeks left before filming ends, Zach and Ashley continue to distance themselves from the other five housemates, which continues into a cast trip to Cabo San Lucas, resulting in bitterness on the part of Nate and especially Frank. Priscilla takes advantage of Mexico's legal drinking age of 18, resulting in more sexualized behavior on her part, and regrets the next day. Upon returning home, Frank tries to open a dialogue with Zach and Ashley, but it ends in a heated argument and the decision by both parties to remain distant from one another.
529	12	"An End to the Endless Summer"	December 14, 2011	1.39
As filming comes to an end, Frank decides to remain in California, thus moving out of his parents’ home. Zach and Ashley intend to maintain their relationship as they each move back home. Nate and Frank hold a fundraiser at the House of Blues to form a partnership between The Living Memoir and the It Gets Better Project, though complications lead to stress for Nate, who gets drunk at the event, and later has a heated argument with Frank over their responsibilities. The cast spend their last day together handing out sandwiches to the homeless, enjoying Alex and the Hats' music, and a final dip in the pool before saying their emotional good-byes the next day.

== After filming ==
The Real World: San Diego Reunion aired on December 21, 2011. Maria Menounos hosted, and featured the entire cast, as they discussed their time during filming and their lives since the show ended.

Since filming ended, Sam moved back with her parents to Chesapeake, Virginia, where she performs her drag king show. Frank moved to Los Angeles, where he is searching for employment and a graduate school. He also keeps in touch with Alex, who returned to Los Angeles, where she lives with her boyfriend Byron. Nate went home for five days, but quickly returned to San Diego to follow up on his business, The Living Memoir, and hopes to develop a relationship with Michelle. San Diego native Priscilla returned home to her mother, where she is attending the University of California, Davis. Ashley returned home to Connecticut, and maintains a long-distance relationship with Zach, who returned home to Brighton, Michigan, where he works as a personal trainer. He stated that he enjoys his "Michigan housemates" better than his Real World housemates.

Among the topics discussed was Zach's and Ashley's tendency to separate themselves from the rest of the group. Frank's issues with his bisexuality, as well as his frustration over a lack of a relationship with Zach and Ashley, were also discussed. Sam and Frank took exception to Zach's homophobic attitude, especially toward gays in the military. Zach in the end acknowledged that he was a bit ignorant due to his rather sheltered and conservative upbringing in a small Midwestern town and most of his prejudice had more to due with culture shock of being in a different environment than he was accustomed to in Michigan and that he has since become more tolerant of different sexual orientations since the filming of the show. The roommates felt that Ashley did not get to know the roommates well during their time (save Zach), with Nate opining that she was miscast. The roommates had mixed opinions as to who exhibited the greatest sexual prowess in the house, and were puzzled regarding Zach's and Ashley's decision to remain abstinent.

Frank Sweeney got engaged in 2015.

In 2016, Ashley Kelsey appeared on The Runner alongside Heather Rae El Moussa. In 2019, Kelsey started dating National Football League player Kerryon Johnson. In late 2020, the couple announced they were expecting their first child together. Their daughter, Snoh Marie Johnson, was born on June 8, 2021.

Alexandra Govere kept releasing music under the name Shungudzo. She has co-written a number of hit songs such as Little Mix's "Touch" and has released a song on the Fifty Shades Freed soundtrack titled "Come On Back". In 2018, she released her single, "Paper". In 2020, she released the single "Freedom for my People" in collaboration with DJ Oliver Heldens.

In 2019, Zach Nichols proposed to Jenna Compono from Real World: Ex-Plosion. The couple first met on the 26th season of The Challenge and appeared on multiple seasons together afterwards. In 2021, Nichols and Compono announced they were expecting their first child. After postponing the wedding to 2022 due to the COVID-19 pandemic, the couple had a more intimate ceremony on March 13, 2021. Their son, Anthony Joseph Nichols, was born on September 2, 2021. Their daughter, Liliana Marie, was born on December 27, 2022. Second daughter Carmella Jean was born on February 24, 2024. Third daughter Francesca Rose was born on August 10, 2025, and son Vincent John was born on August 2, 2026.

=== The Challenge ===
Cast member	Seasons of The Challenge	Other appearances
Alexandra Govere	—N/a	—N/a
Ashley Kelsey	Battle of the Seasons (2012), Invasion of the Champions	The Challenge: Champs vs. Pros, The Challenge: All Stars (season 5)
Frank Sweeney	Battle of the Seasons (2012), Rivals II, Free Agents	The Challenge: All Stars (season 5)
Nate Stodghill	Battle of the Exes	—N/a
Priscilla Mendez	Battle of the Exes	—N/a
Sam McGinn	Battle of the Seasons (2012)	The Challenge: All Stars (season 5)
Zach Nichols	Battle of the Seasons (2012), Rivals II, Free Agents, Battle of the Exes II, Invasion of the Champions, Vendettas, Final Reckoning, War of the Worlds, War of the Worlds 2	The Challenge: Champs vs. Stars (season 1)

Note: Frank made an appearance on Vendettas for an elimination
