= T. J. Lavin =

American BMX rider and television host (born 1976)

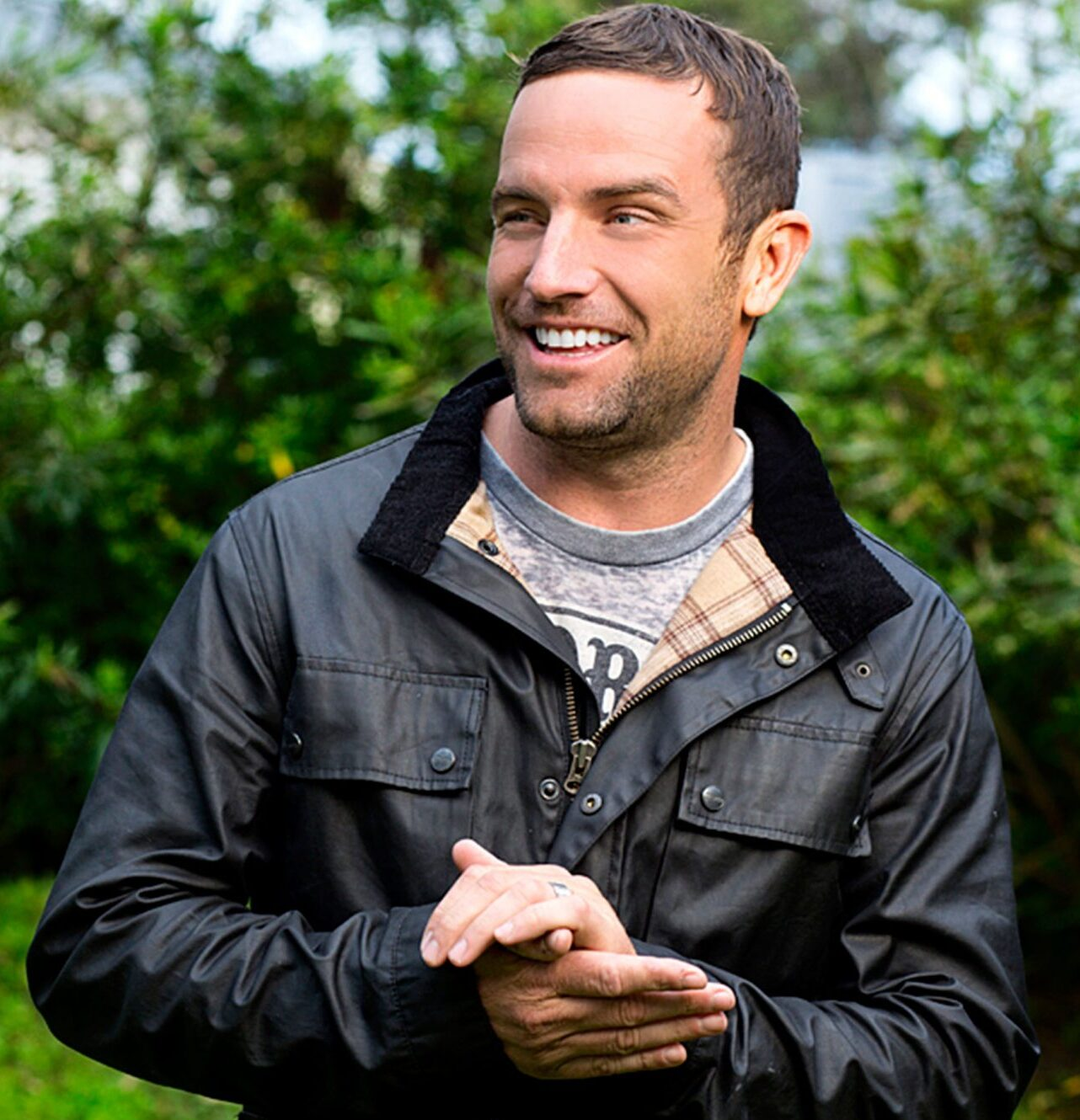
- Born: Thomas Joseph Lavin; December 7, 1976 (age 49); Las Vegas, Nevada, U.S.
- Occupations: Cyclist; television host
- Spouse: Roxanne Siordia (m. 2012)
- Children: 1

Thomas Joseph Lavin (born December 7, 1976) is an American BMX cyclist and the host of MTV's reality competition series The Challenge since its eleventh season.

== Early life ==
Thomas Joseph Lavin was born in Las Vegas, Nevada. Lavin first began to ride bikes when he was two. He eventually became a professional winning his first pro contest at the age of nineteen.

== Career ==
=== BMX ===
He has entered events including the X Games and the Dew Tour. In the X Games he took bronze three times, silver once, and gold three times (One was Australian). He has been a DK Dirt Circuit Champion, a champion in the Gravity Games, a European championship winner, and a CFB Champion. In 1995, he was crowned the "King of Dirt." He has a 1-acre (0.40 ha) BMX track in his backyard which includes several groomed trails and dirt jumps.

Lavin was competing in a Dew Tour event in Las Vegas on October 14, 2010, where he crashed and was rushed to the hospital. Due to the critical injuries he sustained, he was put into a medically induced coma and developed a case of pneumonia shortly after. On October 20, Chas Aday, friend of Lavin, reported that Lavin was breathing on his own, following simple commands like squeezing hands or giving thumbs-up to the doctors and he was expected to make a full recovery. Lavin was able to return home on November 16, 2010.

According to Bleacher Report he is considered one of the greatest BMX riders of all time.

Lavin was included into the USA BMX Hall of Fame on October 29, 2022, in Tulsa, Oklahoma, USA. Source: https://www.usabmx.com/site/sections/8 See photo of Hall of Fame Inductees for 2022..

=== Music ===
Self taught in playing the piano, Lavin used the recording studio in his home to record and release an album called LAVS the First SET. In 2008, Lavin released the single "Soldier", a tribute to his long-time friend Stephen Murray. Stephen crashed during the Dew Action Sports Tour in Baltimore. He suffered a serious spinal injury during a double-backflip attempt on June 22, 2007. All sales from the single were donated to the Stephen Murray Family Fund.

=== MTV ===
Lavin is the subject of the film A Film about T. J. Lavin. He appeared on two episodes of MTV's Cribs.

He has hosted spin-offs, specials, and MTV's reality-competition show The Challenge (originally titled Real World/Road Rules Challenge) since its eleventh season.

== Personal life ==
He married his longtime girlfriend Roxanne Siordia on November 2, 2012, in Las Vegas. The couple had been together for eight years and married on their anniversary. Through Siordia, Lavin has one stepdaughter, whom he has since adopted.

== Filmography ==
=== Television ===
Year	Title	Role	Notes
2002, 2021	MTV Cribs	Himself	Season 6, episode 6; season 18, episode 1
2005–present	The Challenge	Host	Season 11–present
2010	Spring Break Challenge	Host	5 episodes
2021–present	The Challenge: All Stars	Host	Season 1–present
2022–2023	The Challenge: USA	Host	Seasons 1–2
2023	The Challenge: World Championship	Host	12 episodes

== X Games competition history ==
GOLD (2) SILVER (1) BRONZE (3)
YEAR	X GAMES	EVENTS	RANK	MEDAL
1996	Summer X Games II	BMX Dirt	2nd	Silver medal
1997	Summer X Games III	BMX Dirt	1st	Gold medal
1998	Summer X Games IV	BMX Dirt	5th	
1999	Summer X Games V	BMX Dirt	1st	Gold medal
2000	Summer X Games VI	BMX Dirt	3rd	Bronze medal
2001	Summer X Games VII	BMX Dirt	3rd	Bronze medal
2002	Summer X Games VIII	BMX Dirt	4th	
2003	Summer X Games IX	BMX Dirt	6th	
2004	Summer X Games X	BMX Dirt	3rd	Bronze medal
2005	Summer X Games XI	BMX Dirt	5th	
