= List of The Challenge (TV series) contestants =

The Challenge is an American reality television show, which was spun off from the reality shows The Real World and Road Rules. Contestants compete against one another individually, in pairs, or in teams to win cash prizes. First airing in 1998, there have been a total of 40 seasons aired in addition to 12 spin-off seasons, and the show has been filmed on six different continents. The Challenge airs on MTV and is hosted by T. J. Lavin.

Contestants on the show are a combination of alumni from seasons of various reality televisions shows, including The Real World, Road Rules, Are You the One?, Big Brother, and Ex on the Beach, contestants who debuted directly on The Challenge, professional athletes, as well as other celebrities. Prior to the twelfth season, Fresh Meat, contestants had only been from The Real World and Road Rules. The 26th season was the first to feature contestants from Are You the One? Since the 31st season, casting has expanded to feature alumni from several reality television shows, including Big Brother, Ex on the Beach, and Geordie Shore. There has also been one contestant who originated from a special mini-series that aired during MTV's Spring Break programming block in 2010, titled Spring Break Challenge. Contestants are regularly brought back for multiple seasons and use their veteran status along with relationships with other returnees to their advantage.

== Table key ==
Contestant's first appearance on a season of The Challenge
Contestant's first appearance after having previously appeared on a spin-off of The Challenge

== Seasons 1–10 ==
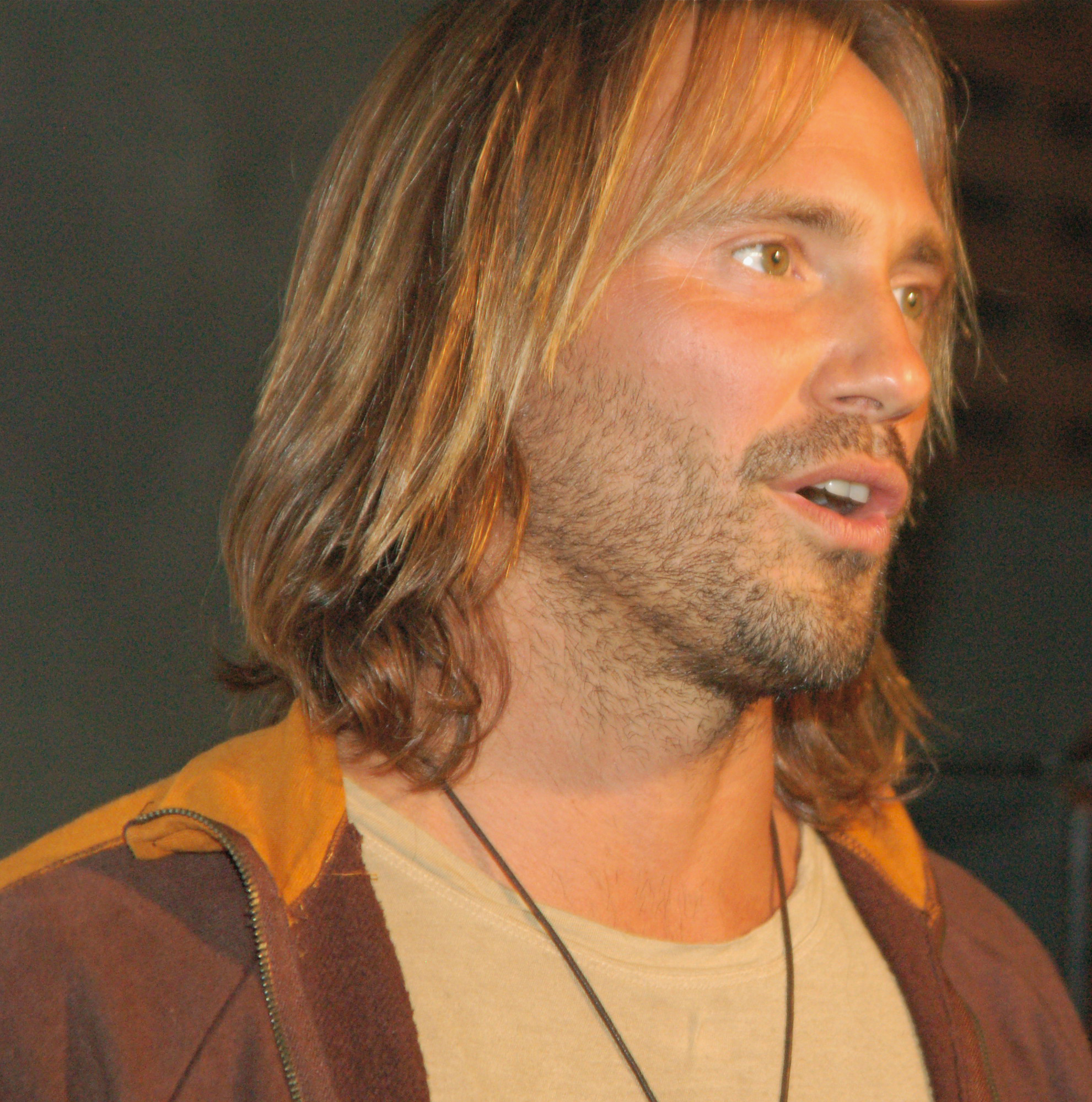
Eric Nies, Road Rules: All Stars, Battle of the Sexes and Battle of the Sexes 2

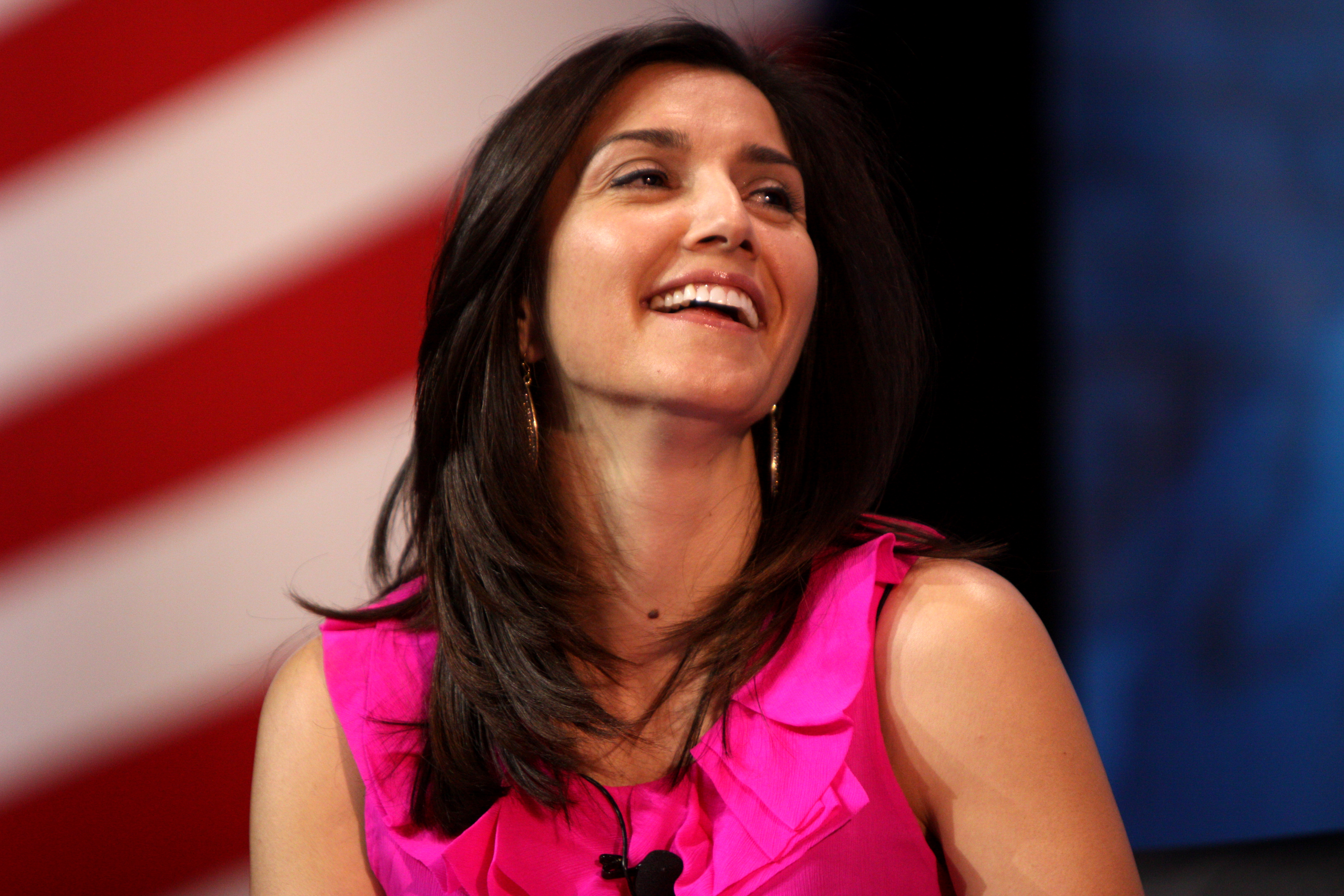
Rachel Campos, Road Rules: All Stars

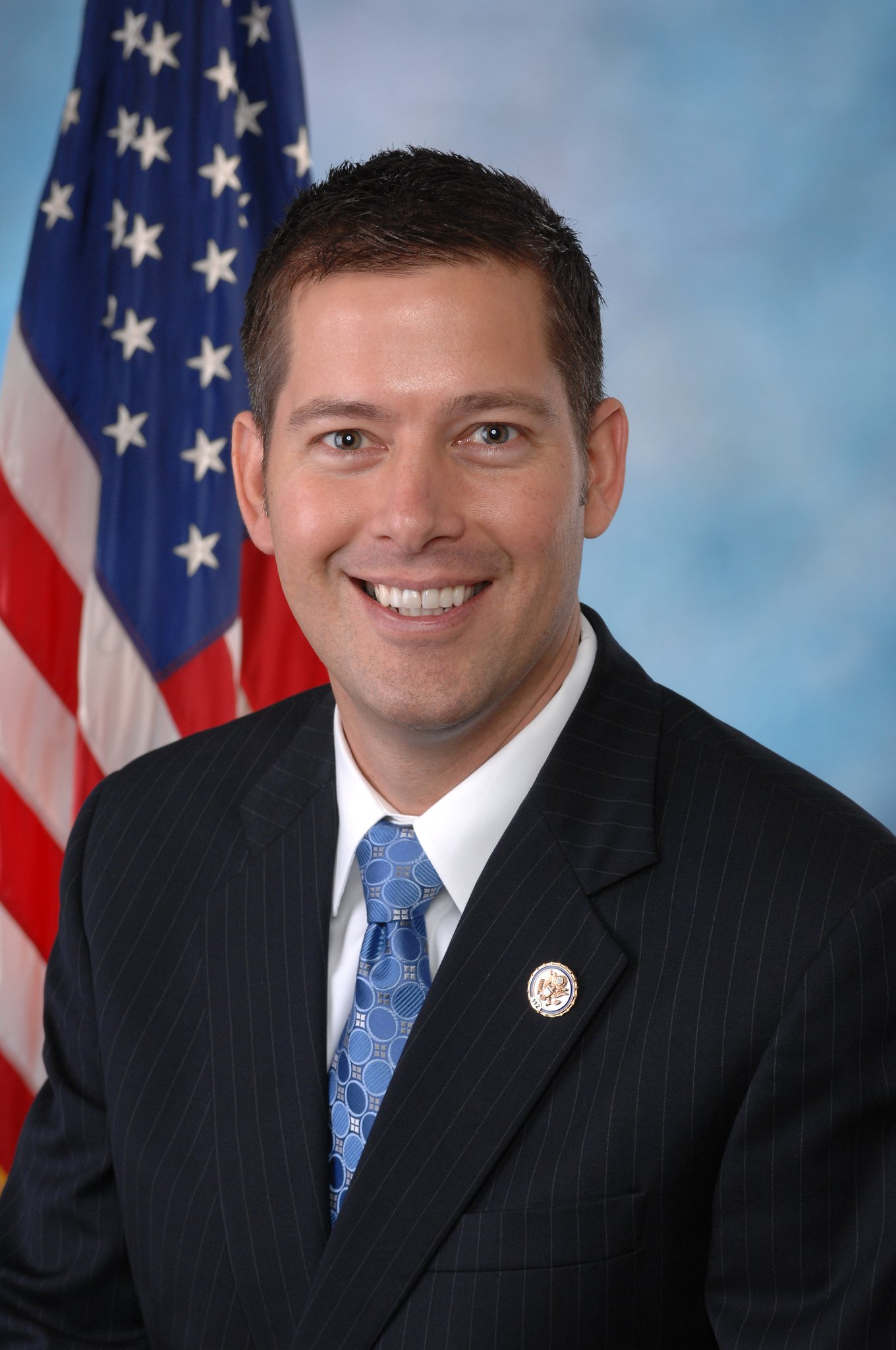
Sean Duffy, Road Rules: All Stars, and Battle of the Seasons

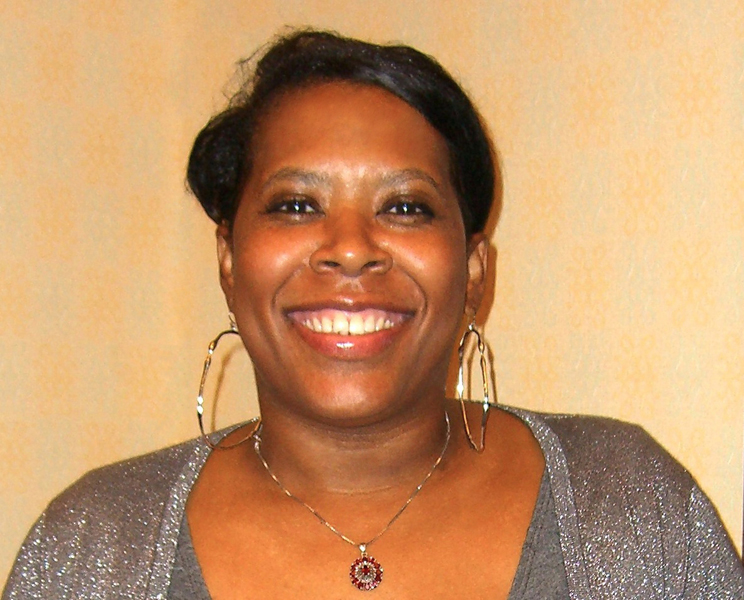
Heather B. Gardner, Challenge 2000

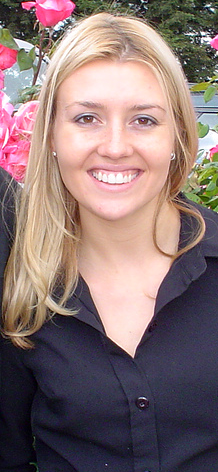
Julie Stoffer, Extreme Challenge, Battle of the Sexes, The Inferno, The Inferno II and The Gauntlet 2

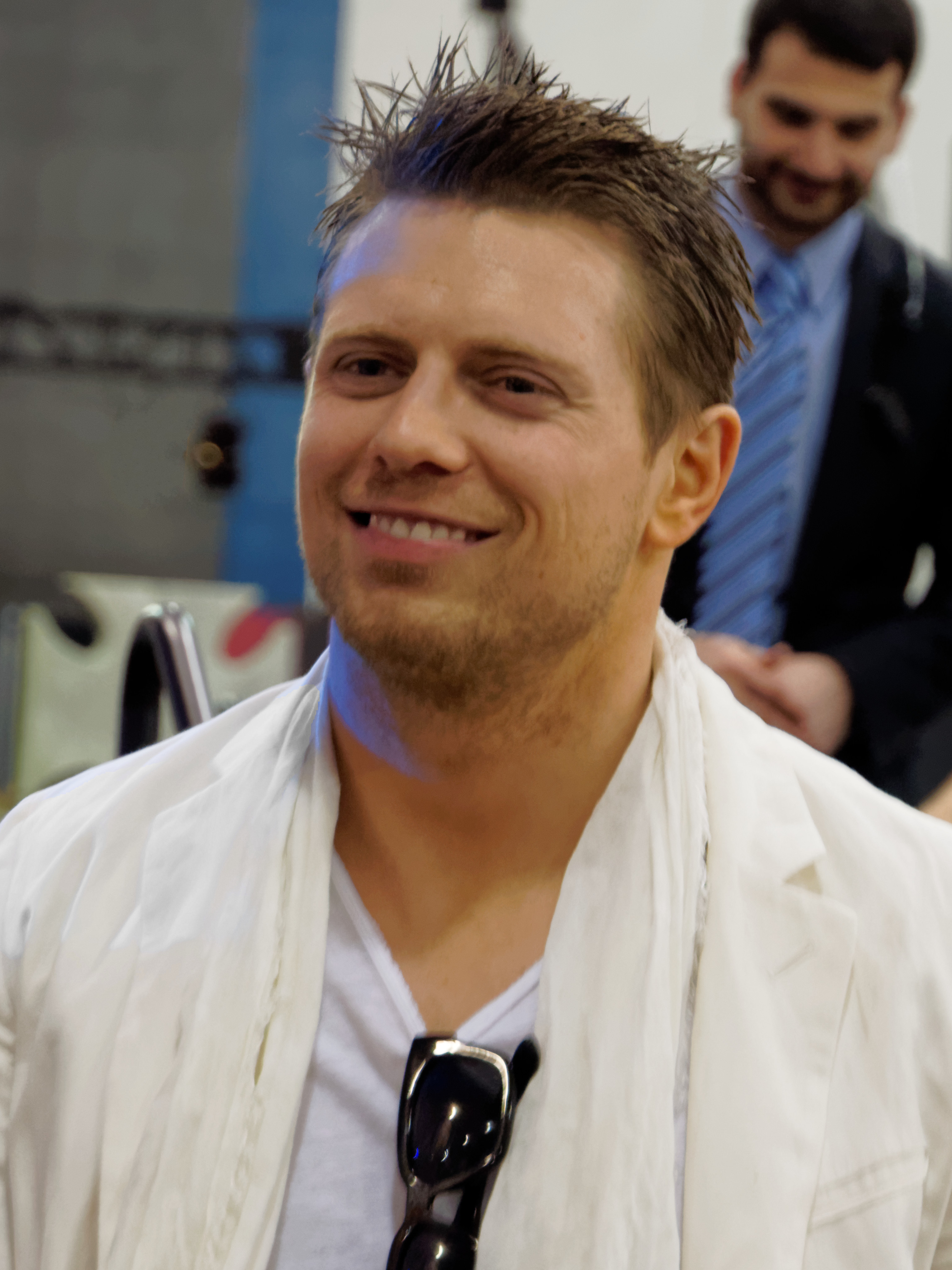
Mike Mizanin, Battle of the Seasons, The Gauntlet, The Inferno, Battle of the Sexes 2 and The Inferno II

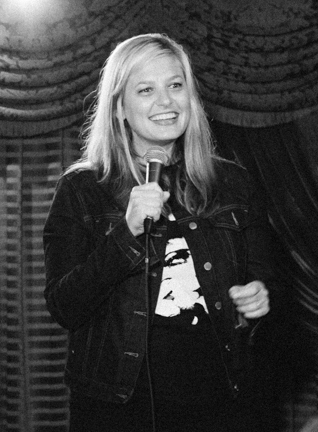
Christina Pazsitzky, Battle of the Sexes

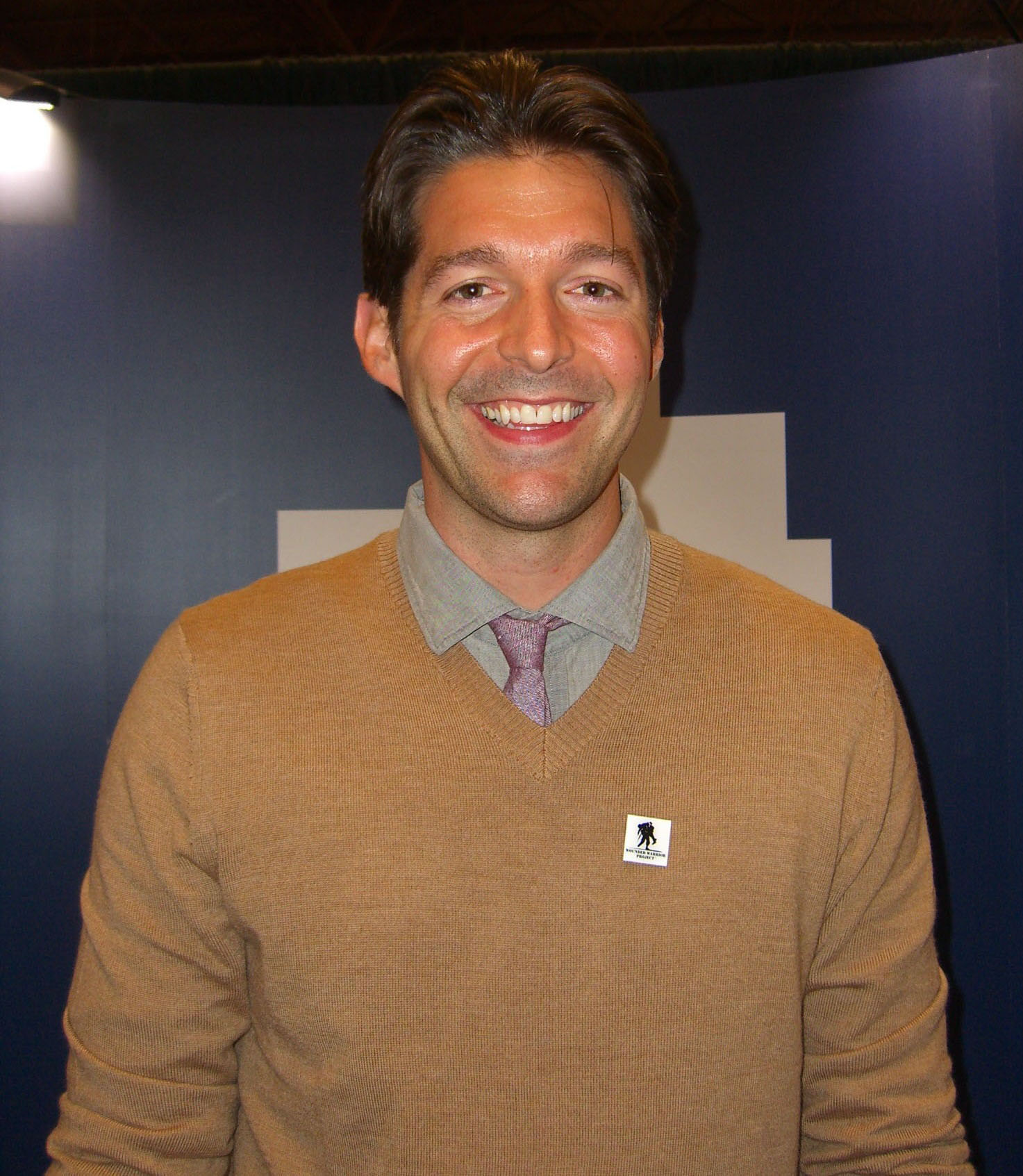
Blair Herter, Battle of the Sexes

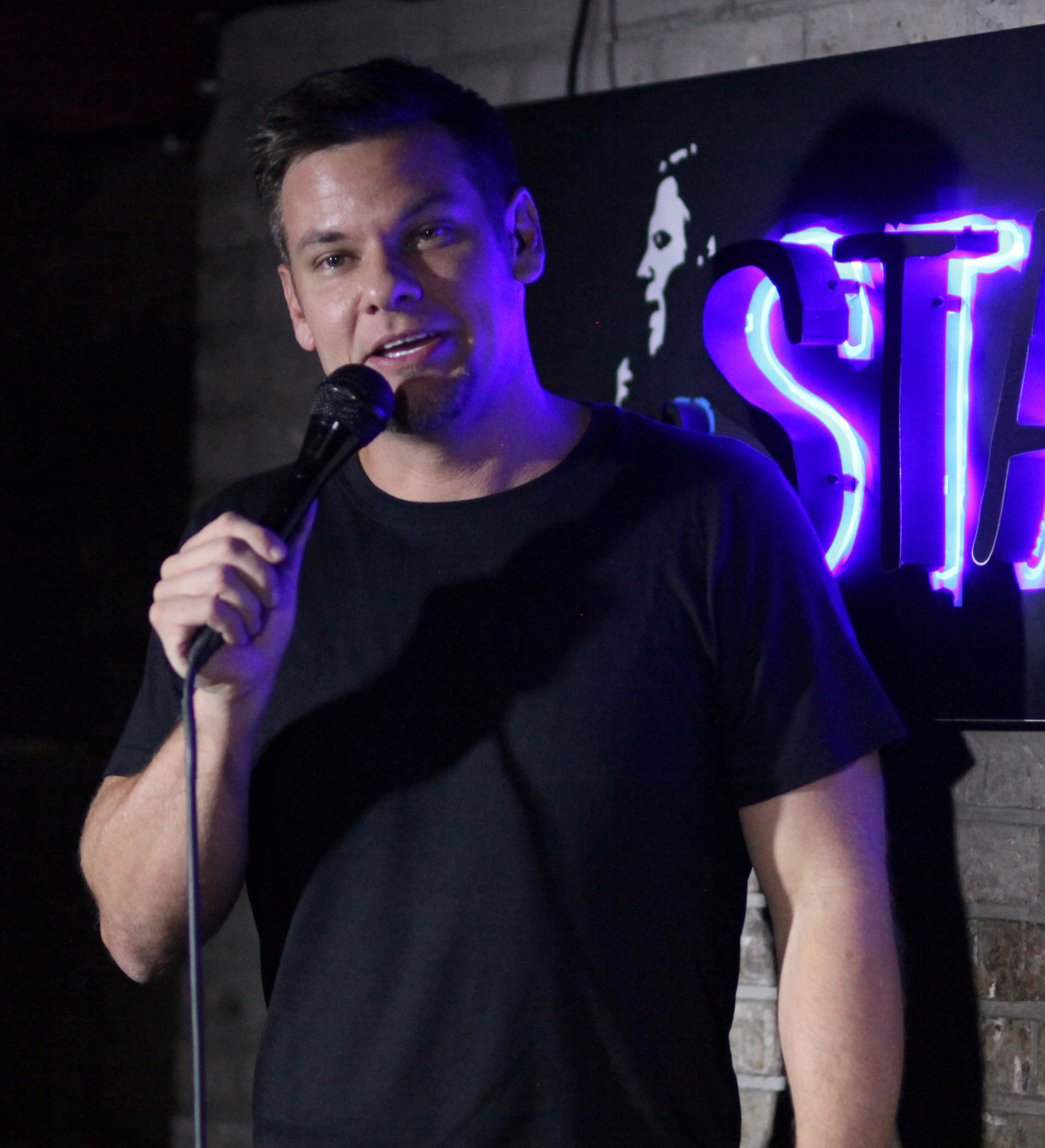
Theo Vonkurnatowski, Battle of the Seasons, The Gauntlet, Battle of the Sexes 2 and Fresh Meat

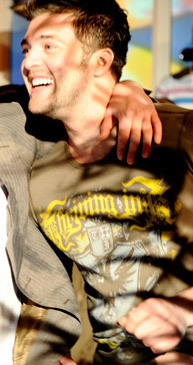
Chris "CT" Tamburello, 22 times contestant

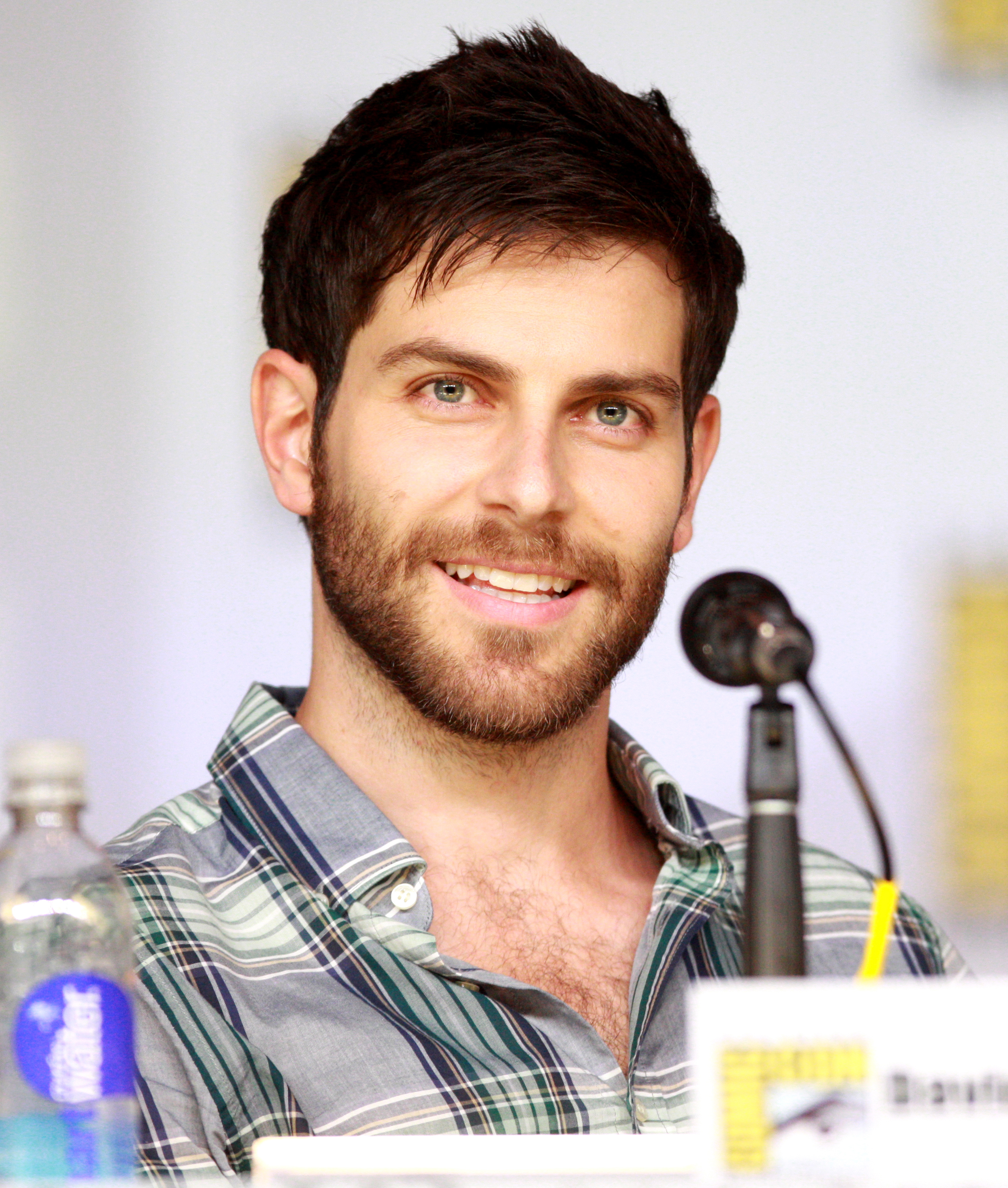
David Giuntoli, The Gauntlet

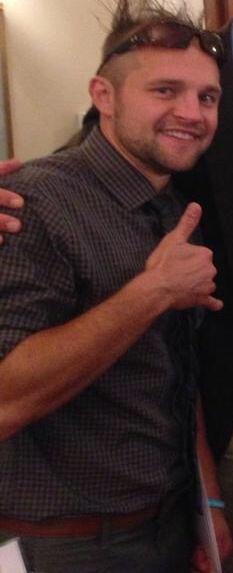
Derrick Kosinski, 12 times contestant

Season	Contestant	Original series	Finish
1. Road Rules: All Stars
1. Road Rules: All Stars	Jon Brennan	The Real World: Los Angeles	Winner
1. Road Rules: All Stars	Rachel Campos	The Real World: San Francisco	Winner
1. Road Rules: All Stars	Sean Duffy	The Real World: Boston	Winner
1. Road Rules: All Stars	Eric Nies	The Real World: New York	Winner
1. Road Rules: All Stars	Cynthia Roberts	The Real World: Miami	Winner
2. Real World vs. Road Rules
2. Real World vs. Road Rules	Kalle Dedolph	Road Rules: Islands	Winner
2. Real World vs. Road Rules	Kefla Hare	Road Rules: Down Under	Winner
2. Real World vs. Road Rules	Mark Long	Road Rules: USA - The First Adventure	Winner
2. Real World vs. Road Rules	Roni Martin	Road Rules: Northern Trail	Winner
2. Real World vs. Road Rules	Noah Rickun	Road Rules: Northern Trail	Winner
2. Real World vs. Road Rules	Anne Wharton	Road Rules: Northern Trail	Winner
2. Real World vs. Road Rules	Nathan Blackburn	The Real World: Seattle	Runner-up
2. Real World vs. Road Rules	Janet Choi	The Real World: Seattle	Runner-up
2. Real World vs. Road Rules	Jason Cornwell	The Real World: Boston	Runner-up
2. Real World vs. Road Rules	Neil Forrester	The Real World: London	Runner-up
2. Real World vs. Road Rules	Montana McGlynn	The Real World: Boston	Runner-up
2. Real World vs. Road Rules	Beth Stolarczyk	The Real World: Los Angeles	Runner-up
3. Challenge 2000
3. Challenge 2000	Yes Duffy	Road Rules: Semester at Sea	Winner
3. Challenge 2000	Carlos "Los" Jackson	Road Rules: USA - The First Adventure	Winner
3. Challenge 2000	Veronica Portillo	Road Rules: Semester at Sea	Winner
3. Challenge 2000	Dan Setzler	Road Rules: Northern Trail	Winner
3. Challenge 2000	Holly Shand	Road Rules: Latin America	Winner
3. Challenge 2000	Bronwen "Piggy" Thomas	Road Rules: Down Under	Winner
3. Challenge 2000	Amaya Brecher	The Real World: Hawaii	Runner-up
3. Challenge 2000	David Burns	The Real World: Seattle	Runner-up
3. Challenge 2000	Heather B. Gardner	The Real World: New York	Runner-up
3. Challenge 2000	Tecumshea "Teck" Holmes III	The Real World: Hawaii	Runner-up
3. Challenge 2000	Mike Lambert	The Real World: Miami	Runner-up
3. Challenge 2000	Kat Ogden	The Real World: London	Runner-up
4. Extreme Challenge
4. Extreme Challenge	Rebecca Lord	The Real World: Seattle	Winner
4. Extreme Challenge	Jamie Murray	The Real World: New Orleans (2000)	Winner
4. Extreme Challenge	Kameelah Phillips	The Real World: Boston	Winner
4. Extreme Challenge	Dan Renzi	The Real World: Miami	Winner
4. Extreme Challenge	Julie Stoffer	The Real World: New Orleans (2000)	Winner
4. Extreme Challenge	Syrus Yarbrough	The Real World: Boston	Winner
4. Extreme Challenge	Emily Bailey	Road Rules: USA - The Second Adventure	Runner-up
4. Extreme Challenge	Christian Breivik	Road Rules: USA - The Second Adventure	Runner-up
4. Extreme Challenge	Susie Meister	Road Rules: Down Under	Runner-up
4. Extreme Challenge	James Orlando	Road Rules: Maximum Velocity Tour	Runner-up
4. Extreme Challenge	Michelle Parma †	Road Rules: Europe	Runner-up
4. Extreme Challenge	Laterrian Wallace	Road Rules: Maximum Velocity Tour	Runner-up
4. Extreme Challenge	Ayanna Mackins	Road Rules: Semester at Sea	Disqualified
5. Battle of the Seasons	Sean Duffy	The Real World: Boston	Winner (2)
5. Battle of the Seasons	Elka Walker	The Real World: Boston	Winner
5. Battle of the Seasons	Mike Mizanin	The Real World: Back to New York	Winner
5. Battle of the Seasons	Coral Smith	The Real World: Back to New York	Winner
5. Battle of the Seasons	Danny Roberts	The Real World: New Orleans (2000)	Winner
5. Battle of the Seasons	Kelley Limp	The Real World: New Orleans (2000)	Winner
5. Battle of the Seasons	Timmy Beggy	Road Rules: USA - The Second Adventure	Runner-up
5. Battle of the Seasons	Emily Bailey	Road Rules: USA - The Second Adventure	Runner-up
5. Battle of the Seasons	Dan Setzler	Road Rules: Northern Trail	Runner-up
5. Battle of the Seasons	Tara McDaniel	Road Rules: Northern Trail	Runner-up
5. Battle of the Seasons	Theo Vonkurnatowski	Road Rules: Maximum Velocity Tour	Runner-up
5. Battle of the Seasons	Holly Brenston	Road Rules: Maximum Velocity Tour	Runner-up
5. Battle of the Seasons	Norman Korpi	The Real World: New York	Eliminated
5. Battle of the Seasons	Rebecca Blasband	The Real World: New York	Eliminated
5. Battle of the Seasons	Josh Florence	Road Rules: Latin America	Eliminated
5. Battle of the Seasons	Holly Shand	Road Rules: Latin America	Eliminated
5. Battle of the Seasons	Mike Lambert	The Real World: Miami	Eliminated
5. Battle of the Seasons	Flora Alekseyeun	The Real World: Miami	Eliminated
5. Battle of the Seasons	Adam Larson	Road Rules: The Quest	Eliminated
5. Battle of the Seasons	Jisela Delgado	Road Rules: The Quest	Eliminated
5. Battle of the Seasons	Stephen Williams IV	The Real World: Seattle	Eliminated
5. Battle of the Seasons	Lindsay Brien	The Real World: Seattle	Eliminated
5. Battle of the Seasons	Chris Melling	Road Rules: Europe	Eliminated
5. Battle of the Seasons	Belou Den Tex	Road Rules: Europe	Eliminated
5. Battle of the Seasons	Mike Johnson	The Real World: London	Eliminated
5. Battle of the Seasons	Sharon Gitau	The Real World: London	Eliminated
5. Battle of the Seasons	Chadwick Pelletier	Road Rules: Down Under	Eliminated
5. Battle of the Seasons	Bronwen "Piggy" Thomas	Road Rules: Down Under	Eliminated
5. Battle of the Seasons	Jon Brennan	The Real World: Los Angeles	Eliminated
5. Battle of the Seasons	Beth Stolarczyk	The Real World: Los Angeles	Eliminated
5. Battle of the Seasons	Yes Duffy	Road Rules: Semester at Sea	Eliminated
5. Battle of the Seasons	Veronica Portillo	Road Rules: Semester at Sea	Eliminated
6. Battle of the Sexes	Mark Long	Road Rules: USA - The First Adventure	Winner (2)
6. Battle of the Sexes	Colin Mortensen	The Real World: Hawaii	Winner
6. Battle of the Sexes	Jamie Murray	The Real World: New Orleans (2000)	Winner (2)
6. Battle of the Sexes	Ruthie Alcaide	The Real World: Hawaii	Runner-up
6. Battle of the Sexes	Ellen Cho	Road Rules: The Quest	Runner-up
6. Battle of the Sexes	Lori Trespicio	The Real World: Back to New York	Runner-up
6. Battle of the Sexes	Antoine de Bouverie	Road Rules: Europe	Eliminated
6. Battle of the Sexes	Melissa Howard	The Real World: New Orleans (2000)	Eliminated
6. Battle of the Sexes	Shane Landrum	Road Rules: Campus Crawl	Eliminated
6. Battle of the Sexes	Genesis Moss	The Real World: Boston	Eliminated
6. Battle of the Sexes	James Orlando	Road Rules: Maximum Velocity Tour	Eliminated
6. Battle of the Sexes	Emily Bailey	Road Rules: USA - The Second Adventure	Eliminated
6. Battle of the Sexes	Eric Nies	The Real World: New York	Eliminated
6. Battle of the Sexes	Anne Wharton	Road Rules: Northern Trail	Eliminated
6. Battle of the Sexes	Blair Herter	Road Rules: The Quest	Eliminated
6. Battle of the Sexes	Ayanna Mackins	Road Rules: Semester at Sea	Eliminated
6. Battle of the Sexes	Syrus Yarbrough	The Real World: Boston	Eliminated
6. Battle of the Sexes	Veronica Portillo	Road Rules: Semester at Sea	Eliminated
6. Battle of the Sexes	Theo Gantt III	The Real World: Chicago	Eliminated
6. Battle of the Sexes	Christina Pazsitzky	Road Rules: Down Under	Eliminated
6. Battle of the Sexes	Jake Bronstein	Road Rules: Islands	Eliminated
6. Battle of the Sexes	Tonya Cooley	The Real World: Chicago	Eliminated
6. Battle of the Sexes	Dan Renzi	The Real World: Miami	Eliminated
6. Battle of the Sexes	Aneesa Ferreira	The Real World: Chicago	Eliminated
6. Battle of the Sexes	David "Puck" Rainey	The Real World: San Francisco	Eliminated
6. Battle of the Sexes	Rachel Robinson	Road Rules: Campus Crawl	Eliminated
6. Battle of the Sexes	Yes Duffy	Road Rules: Semester at Sea	Eliminated
6. Battle of the Sexes	Amaya Brecher	The Real World: Hawaii	Eliminated
6. Battle of the Sexes	David Broom	The Real World: New Orleans (2000)	Eliminated
6. Battle of the Sexes	Jisela Delgado	Road Rules: The Quest	Eliminated
6. Battle of the Sexes	Eric Jones	Road Rules: Campus Crawl	Eliminated
6. Battle of the Sexes	Gladys Sanabria	Road Rules: Latin America	Eliminated
6. Battle of the Sexes	Laterrian Wallace	Road Rules: Maximum Velocity Tour	Eliminated
6. Battle of the Sexes	Beth Stolarczyk	The Real World: Los Angeles	Eliminated
6. Battle of the Sexes	David Edwards	The Real World: Los Angeles	Eliminated
6. Battle of the Sexes	Julie Stoffer	The Real World: New Orleans (2000)	Eliminated
7. The Gauntlet	Adam Larson	Road Rules: The Quest	Winner
7. The Gauntlet	Dave Giuntoli	Road Rules: South Pacific	Winner
7. The Gauntlet	Sarah Greyson	Road Rules: Campus Crawl	Winner
7. The Gauntlet	Roni Martin	Road Rules: Northern Trail	Winner (2)
7. The Gauntlet	Veronica Portillo	Road Rules: Semester at Sea	Winner (2)
7. The Gauntlet	Rachel Robinson	Road Rules: Campus Crawl	Winner
7. The Gauntlet	Darrell Taylor	Road Rules: Campus Crawl	Winner
7. The Gauntlet	Theo Vonkurnatowski	Road Rules: Maximum Velocity Tour	Winner
7. The Gauntlet	Cara Zavaleta	Road Rules: South Pacific	Winner
7. The Gauntlet	Nathan Blackburn	The Real World: Seattle	Runner-up
7. The Gauntlet	Norman Korpi	The Real World: New York	Runner-up
7. The Gauntlet	Mike Mizanin	The Real World: Back to New York	Runner-up
7. The Gauntlet	Coral Smith	The Real World: Back to New York	Runner-up (DNF)
7. The Gauntlet	Alton Williams	The Real World: Las Vegas (2002)	Runner-up
7. The Gauntlet	Theo Gantt III	The Real World: Chicago	Eliminated
7. The Gauntlet	Irulan Wilson	The Real World: Las Vegas (2002)	Eliminated
7. The Gauntlet	Abram Boise	Road Rules: South Pacific	Eliminated
7. The Gauntlet	Laterrian Wallace	Road Rules: Maximum Velocity Tour	Eliminated
7. The Gauntlet	Rachel Braband	The Real World: Back to New York	Eliminated
7. The Gauntlet	Trishelle Cannatella	The Real World: Las Vegas (2002)	Eliminated
7. The Gauntlet	Steve Meinke	Road Rules: The Quest	Eliminated
7. The Gauntlet	Elka Walker	The Real World: Boston	Eliminated
7. The Gauntlet	Matt Smith	The Real World: New Orleans (2000)	Eliminated
7. The Gauntlet	Tina Barta	Road Rules: South Pacific	Eliminated
7. The Gauntlet	Katie Doyle	Road Rules: The Quest	Eliminated
7. The Gauntlet	Tonya Cooley	The Real World: Chicago	Eliminated
7. The Gauntlet	Montana McGlynn	The Real World: Boston	Eliminated
7. The Gauntlet	David Broom	The Real World: New Orleans (2000)	Eliminated
8. The Inferno	Timmy Beggy	Road Rules: USA - The Second Adventure	Winner
8. The Inferno	Abram Boise	Road Rules: South Pacific	Winner
8. The Inferno	Katie Doyle	Road Rules: The Quest	Winner
8. The Inferno	Christena Pyle	Road Rules: South Pacific	Winner
8. The Inferno	Holly Shand	Road Rules: Latin America	Winner (2)
8. The Inferno	Kendal Sheppard	Road Rules: Campus Crawl	Winner
8. The Inferno	Darrell Taylor	Road Rules: Campus Crawl	Winner (2)
8. The Inferno	Veronica Portillo	Road Rules: Semester at Sea	Winner (3)
8. The Inferno	Mike Mizanin	The Real World: Back to New York	Runner-up
8. The Inferno	Coral Smith	The Real World: Back to New York	Runner-up
8. The Inferno	Chris "CT" Tamburello	The Real World: Paris	Runner-up
8. The Inferno	Syrus Yarbrough	The Real World: Boston	Runner-up
8. The Inferno	David Burns	The Real World: Seattle	Eliminated
8. The Inferno	Leah Gillingwater	The Real World: Paris	Eliminated
8. The Inferno	Julie Stoffer	The Real World: New Orleans (2000)	Eliminated
8. The Inferno	Shane Landrum	Road Rules: Campus Crawl	Eliminated
8. The Inferno	Mallory Snyder	The Real World: Paris	Eliminated
8. The Inferno	Jeremy Blossom	Road Rules: South Pacific	Eliminated
8. The Inferno	Trishelle Cannatella	The Real World: Las Vegas (2002)	Eliminated
8. The Inferno	Ace Amerson	The Real World: Paris	Eliminated
9. Battle of the Sexes 2	Eric Nies	The Real World: New York	Winner (2)
9. Battle of the Sexes 2	Dan Setzler	Road Rules: Northern Trail	Winner (2)
9. Battle of the Sexes 2	Theo Vonkurnatowski	Road Rules: Maximum Velocity Tour	Winner (2)
9. Battle of the Sexes 2	Arissa Hill	The Real World: Las Vegas (2002)	Runner-up
9. Battle of the Sexes 2	Sophia Pasquis	Road Rules: The Quest	Runner-up
9. Battle of the Sexes 2	Coral Smith	The Real World: Back to New York	Runner-up
9. Battle of the Sexes 2	Mark Long	Road Rules: USA - The First Adventure	Eliminated
9. Battle of the Sexes 2	Tina Barta	Road Rules: South Pacific	Eliminated
9. Battle of the Sexes 2	Brad Fiorenza	The Real World: San Diego (2004)	Eliminated
9. Battle of the Sexes 2	Ruthie Alcaide	The Real World: Hawaii	Eliminated
9. Battle of the Sexes 2	Shane Landrum	Road Rules: Campus Crawl	Eliminated
9. Battle of the Sexes 2	Robin Hibbard	The Real World: San Diego (2004)	Eliminated
9. Battle of the Sexes 2	Steven Hill	The Real World: Las Vegas (2002)	Eliminated
9. Battle of the Sexes 2	Tonya Cooley	The Real World: Chicago	Eliminated
9. Battle of the Sexes 2	Randy Barry	The Real World: San Diego (2004)	Eliminated
9. Battle of the Sexes 2	Ibis Nieves	Road Rules: X-Treme	Eliminated
9. Battle of the Sexes 2	Frank Roessler	The Real World: Las Vegas (2002)	Eliminated
9. Battle of the Sexes 2	Veronica Portillo	Road Rules: Semester at Sea	Eliminated
9. Battle of the Sexes 2	Nick Haggart	Road Rules: X-Treme	Eliminated
9. Battle of the Sexes 2	Aneesa Ferreira	The Real World: Chicago	Eliminated
9. Battle of the Sexes 2	Chris Graebe	Road Rules: South Pacific	Eliminated
9. Battle of the Sexes 2	Katie Doyle	Road Rules: The Quest	Eliminated
9. Battle of the Sexes 2	Mike Mizanin	The Real World: Back to New York	Eliminated
9. Battle of the Sexes 2	Rachel Robinson	Road Rules: Campus Crawl	Eliminated
9. Battle of the Sexes 2	Shawn Sealy	Road Rules: Semester at Sea	Eliminated
9. Battle of the Sexes 2	Angela Trimbur	Road Rules: X-Treme	Eliminated
9. Battle of the Sexes 2	Derrick Kosinski	Road Rules: X-Treme	Eliminated
9. Battle of the Sexes 2	Cynthia Roberts	The Real World: Miami	Eliminated
9. Battle of the Sexes 2	Abram Boise	Road Rules: South Pacific	Eliminated
9. Battle of the Sexes 2	Ayanna Mackins	Road Rules: Semester at Sea	Eliminated
9. Battle of the Sexes 2	Adam King	The Real World: Paris	Eliminated
9. Battle of the Sexes 2	Kina Dean	Road Rules: X-Treme	Eliminated
9. Battle of the Sexes 2	Ace Amerson	The Real World: Paris	Eliminated
9. Battle of the Sexes 2	Cameran Eubanks	The Real World: San Diego (2004)	Eliminated
9. Battle of the Sexes 2	Jacquese Smith	The Real World: San Diego (2004)	Eliminated
9. Battle of the Sexes 2	Genesis Moss	The Real World: Boston	Eliminated
10. The Inferno II	Darrell Taylor	Road Rules: Campus Crawl	Winner (3)
10. The Inferno II	Jamie Chung	The Real World: San Diego (2004)	Winner
10. The Inferno II	Landon Lueck	The Real World: Philadelphia	Winner
10. The Inferno II	Mike Mizanin	The Real World: Back to New York	Winner (2)
10. The Inferno II	Tina Barta	Road Rules: South Pacific	Runner-up
10. The Inferno II	Abram Boise	Road Rules: South Pacific	Runner-up
10. The Inferno II	Tonya Cooley	The Real World: Chicago	Runner-up
10. The Inferno II	Derrick Kosinski	Road Rules: X-Treme	Runner-up
10. The Inferno II	Veronica Portillo	Road Rules: Semester at Sea	Runner-up
10. The Inferno II	Rachel Robinson	Road Rules: Campus Crawl	Runner-up
10. The Inferno II	Chris "CT" Tamburello	The Real World: Paris	Runner-up
10. The Inferno II	Shavonda Billingslea	The Real World: Philadelphia	Eliminated
10. The Inferno II	Dan Renzi	The Real World: Miami	Eliminated
10. The Inferno II	Julie Stoffer	The Real World: New Orleans (2000)	Eliminated
10. The Inferno II	Brad Fiorenza	The Real World: San Diego (2004)	Eliminated
10. The Inferno II	Jodi Weatherton	Road Rules: X-Treme	Eliminated
10. The Inferno II	Karamo Brown	The Real World: Philadelphia	Eliminated
10. The Inferno II	Beth Stolarczyk	The Real World: Los Angeles	Quit
10. The Inferno II	Robin Hibbard	The Real World: San Diego (2004)	Eliminated
10. The Inferno II	Jon Brennan	The Real World: Los Angeles	Eliminated

== Seasons 11–20 ==
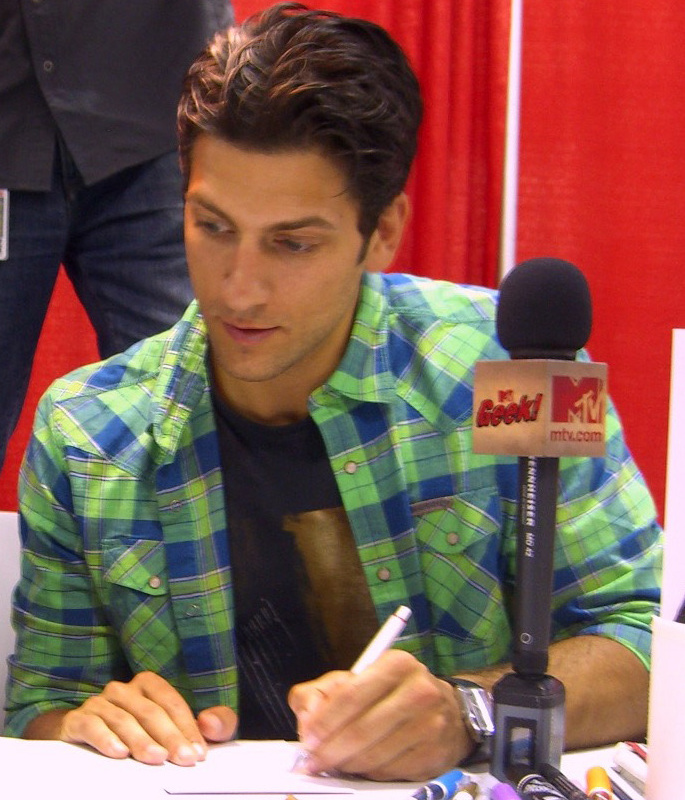
Kenny Santucci, 8 times contestant

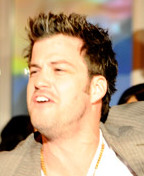
Johnny Devenanzio, 24 times contestant

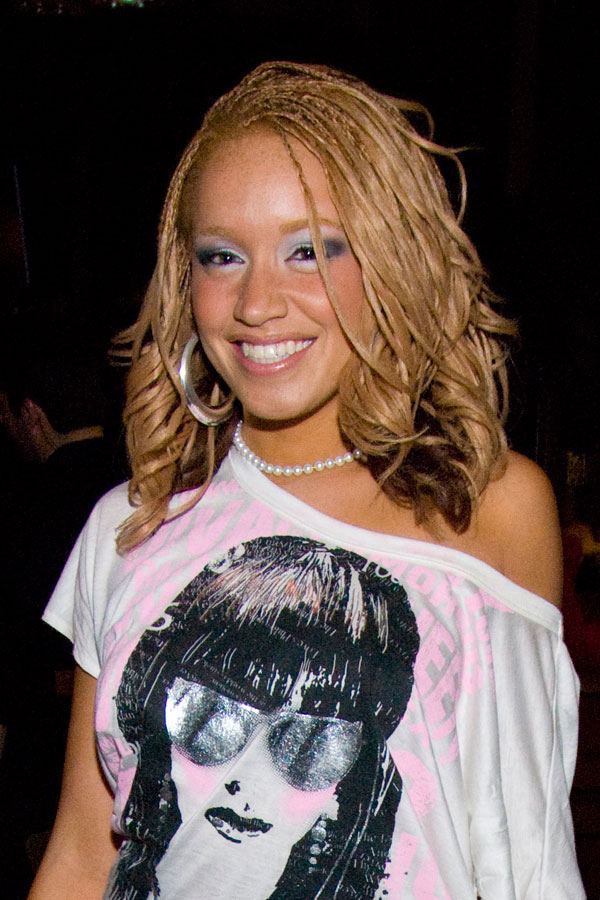
Brianna Taylor, The Ruins

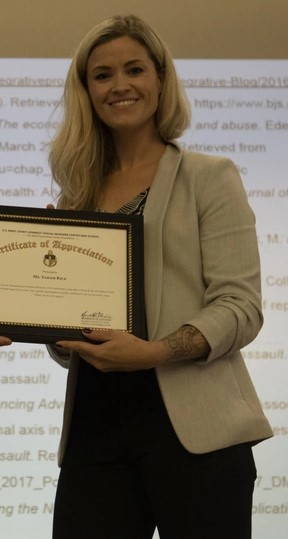
Sarah Rice, 9 times contestant

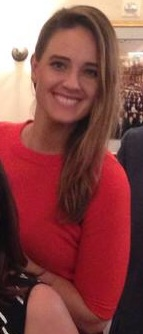
Laurel Stucky, 8 times contestant

Season	Contestant	Original series	Finish
11. The Gauntlet 2	Randy Barry	The Real World: San Diego (2004)	Winner
11. The Gauntlet 2	Kina Dean	Road Rules: X-Treme	Winner
11. The Gauntlet 2	MJ Garrett	The Real World: Philadelphia	Winner
11. The Gauntlet 2	Landon Lueck	The Real World: Philadelphia	Winner (2)
11. The Gauntlet 2	Susie Meister	Road Rules: Down Under	Winner
11. The Gauntlet 2	Jamie Murray	The Real World: New Orleans (2000)	Winner (3)
11. The Gauntlet 2	Ibis Nieves	Road Rules: X-Treme	Winner
11. The Gauntlet 2	Jodi Weatherton	Road Rules: X-Treme	Winner
11. The Gauntlet 2	Alton Williams	The Real World: Las Vegas (2002)	Winner
11. The Gauntlet 2	Timmy Beggy	Road Rules: USA - The Second Adventure	Runner-up
11. The Gauntlet 2	David Burns	The Real World: Seattle	Runner-up
11. The Gauntlet 2	Katie Doyle	Road Rules: The Quest	Runner-up
11. The Gauntlet 2	Aneesa Ferreira	The Real World: Chicago	Runner-up
11. The Gauntlet 2	Robin Hibbard	The Real World: San Diego (2004)	Runner-up
11. The Gauntlet 2	Mark Long	Road Rules: USA - The First Adventure	Runner-up
11. The Gauntlet 2	Julie Stoffer	The Real World: New Orleans (2000)	Runner-up
11. The Gauntlet 2	Derrick Kosinski	Road Rules: X-Treme	Eliminated
11. The Gauntlet 2	Jillian Zoboroski	Road Rules: X-Treme	Eliminated
11. The Gauntlet 2	Brad Fiorenza	The Real World: San Diego (2004)	Eliminated
11. The Gauntlet 2	Beth Stolarczyk	The Real World: Los Angeles	Quit
11. The Gauntlet 2	Jeremy Blossom	Road Rules: South Pacific	Eliminated
11. The Gauntlet 2	Cara Zavaleta	Road Rules: South Pacific	Eliminated
11. The Gauntlet 2	Syrus Yarbrough	The Real World: Boston	Eliminated
11. The Gauntlet 2	Montana McGlynn	The Real World: Boston	Eliminated
11. The Gauntlet 2	Ace Amerson	The Real World: Paris	Eliminated
11. The Gauntlet 2	Ruthie Alcaide	The Real World: Hawaii	Eliminated
11. The Gauntlet 2	Jisela Delgado	Road Rules: The Quest	Eliminated
11. The Gauntlet 2	Adam King	The Real World: Paris	Eliminated
11. The Gauntlet 2	Danny Dias †	Road Rules: X-Treme	Eliminated
11. The Gauntlet 2	Adam Larson	Road Rules: The Quest	Eliminated
11. The Gauntlet 2	Cameran Eubanks	The Real World: San Diego (2004)	Quit
11. The Gauntlet 2	Jo Rhodes	The Real World: San Francisco	Quit
12. Fresh Meat	Darrell Taylor	Road Rules: Campus Crawl	Winner (4)
12. Fresh Meat	Aviv Melmed	Fresh Meat	Winner
12. Fresh Meat	Tina Barta	Road Rules: South Pacific	Runner-up
12. Fresh Meat	Kenny Santucci	Fresh Meat	Runner-up
12. Fresh Meat	Wes Bergmann	The Real World: Austin	Third place
12. Fresh Meat	Casey Cooper	Fresh Meat	Third place
12. Fresh Meat	Derrick Kosinski	Road Rules: X-Treme	Eliminated
12. Fresh Meat	Diem Brown †	Fresh Meat	Eliminated
12. Fresh Meat	Theo Vonkurnatowski	Road Rules: Maximum Velocity Tour	Eliminated
12. Fresh Meat	Chanda Sneed	Fresh Meat	Eliminated
12. Fresh Meat	Shane Landrum	Road Rules: Campus Crawl	Eliminated
12. Fresh Meat	Linette Gallo	Fresh Meat	Eliminated
12. Fresh Meat	Coral Smith	The Real World: Back to New York	Injured
12. Fresh Meat	Evan Starkman	Fresh Meat	Injured
12. Fresh Meat	Katie Doyle	Road Rules: The Quest	Eliminated
12. Fresh Meat	Eric Banks	Fresh Meat	Eliminated
12. Fresh Meat	Tonya Cooley	The Real World: Chicago	Eliminated
12. Fresh Meat	Johnnie McBride	Fresh Meat	Eliminated
12. Fresh Meat	Johanna Botta	The Real World: Austin	Eliminated
12. Fresh Meat	Jesse Stark	Fresh Meat	Eliminated
12. Fresh Meat	Melinda Stolp	The Real World: Austin	Eliminated
12. Fresh Meat	Ryan Kehoe	Fresh Meat	Eliminated
12. Fresh Meat	Danny Jamieson	The Real World: Austin	Eliminated
12. Fresh Meat	Evelyn Smith	Fresh Meat	Eliminated
13. The Duel	Wes Bergmann	The Real World: Austin	Winner
13. The Duel	Jodi Weatherton	Road Rules: X-Treme	Winner (2)
13. The Duel	Brad Fiorenza	The Real World: San Diego (2004)	Runner-up
13. The Duel	Svetlana Shusterman	The Real World: Key West	Runner-up
13. The Duel	Aneesa Ferreira	The Real World: Chicago	Eliminated
13. The Duel	Chris "CT" Tamburello	The Real World: Paris	Eliminated
13. The Duel	Diem Brown †	Fresh Meat	Eliminated
13. The Duel	Evan Starkman	Fresh Meat	Eliminated
13. The Duel	Kina Dean	Road Rules: X-Treme	Eliminated
13. The Duel	Eric Banks	Fresh Meat	Eliminated
13. The Duel	Robin Hibbard	The Real World: San Diego (2004)	Eliminated
13. The Duel	Derrick Kosinski	Road Rules: X-Treme	Eliminated
13. The Duel	Beth Stolarczyk	The Real World: Los Angeles	Eliminated
13. The Duel	Nehemiah Clark	The Real World: Austin	Eliminated
13. The Duel	Casey Cooper	Fresh Meat	Eliminated
13. The Duel	Kenny Santucci	Fresh Meat	Eliminated
13. The Duel	Paula Meronek	The Real World: Key West	Eliminated
13. The Duel	Tyler Duckworth †	The Real World: Key West	Eliminated
13. The Duel	Tina Barta	Road Rules: South Pacific	Disqualified
13. The Duel	Johnny "Bananas" Devenanzio	The Real World: Key West	Eliminated
14. The Inferno 3	Abram Boise	Road Rules: South Pacific	Winner (2)
14. The Inferno 3	Janelle Casanave	The Real World: Key West	Winner
14. The Inferno 3	Tonya Cooley	The Real World: Chicago	Winner
14. The Inferno 3	Derrick Kosinski	Road Rules: X-Treme	Winner
14. The Inferno 3	Kenny Santucci	Fresh Meat	Winner
14. The Inferno 3	Evelyn Smith	Fresh Meat	Winner
14. The Inferno 3	Ace Amerson	The Real World: Paris	Runner-up
14. The Inferno 3	Johnny "Bananas" Devenanzio	The Real World: Key West	Runner-up
14. The Inferno 3	Susie Meister	Road Rules: Down Under	Runner-up
14. The Inferno 3	Paula Meronek	The Real World: Key West	Runner-up
14. The Inferno 3	Alton Williams	The Real World: Las Vegas (2002)	Runner-up
14. The Inferno 3	Cara Zavaleta	Road Rules: South Pacific	Runner-up
14. The Inferno 3	Aneesa Ferreira	The Real World: Chicago	Eliminated
14. The Inferno 3	Davis Mallory	The Real World: Denver	Eliminated
14. The Inferno 3	Jenn Grijalva	The Real World: Denver	Eliminated
14. The Inferno 3	Timmy Beggy	Road Rules: USA - The Second Adventure	Eliminated
14. The Inferno 3	Colie Edison	The Real World: Denver	Eliminated
14. The Inferno 3	Danny Jamieson	The Real World: Austin	Eliminated
14. The Inferno 3	Rachel Moyal	The Real World: Austin	Eliminated
14. The Inferno 3	Tyrie Ballard	The Real World: Denver	Eliminated
14. The Inferno 3	Chris "CT" Tamburello	The Real World: Paris	Disqualified
15. The Gauntlet III	Johanna Botta	The Real World: Austin	Winner
15. The Gauntlet III	Nehemiah Clark	The Real World: Austin	Winner
15. The Gauntlet III	Tori Hall	Road Rules: Viewers' Revenge	Winner
15. The Gauntlet III	Rachel Moyal	The Real World: Austin	Winner
15. The Gauntlet III	Frank Roessler	The Real World: Las Vegas (2002)	Winner
15. The Gauntlet III	Jillian Zoboroski	Road Rules: X-Treme	Winner
15. The Gauntlet III	Diem Brown †	Fresh Meat	Runner-up
15. The Gauntlet III	Brad Fiorenza	The Real World: San Diego (2004)	Runner-up
15. The Gauntlet III	Robin Hibbard	The Real World: San Diego (2004)	Runner-up
15. The Gauntlet III	Adam King	The Real World: Paris	Runner-up
15. The Gauntlet III	Paula Meronek	The Real World: Key West	Runner-up
15. The Gauntlet III	Kenny Santucci	Fresh Meat	Runner-up
15. The Gauntlet III	Evelyn Smith	Fresh Meat	Runner-up
15. The Gauntlet III	Evan Starkman	Fresh Meat	Runner-up
15. The Gauntlet III	Chris "CT" Tamburello	The Real World: Paris	Runner-up
15. The Gauntlet III	Eric Banks	Fresh Meat	Runner-up (DNF)
15. The Gauntlet III	Danny Jamieson	The Real World: Austin	Eliminated
15. The Gauntlet III	Katie Doyle	Road Rules: The Quest	Eliminated
15. The Gauntlet III	Ryan Kehoe	Fresh Meat	Eliminated
15. The Gauntlet III	Casey Cooper	Fresh Meat	Eliminated
15. The Gauntlet III	Coral Smith	The Real World: Back to New York	Eliminated
15. The Gauntlet III	MJ Garrett	The Real World: Philadelphia	Eliminated
15. The Gauntlet III	Melinda Stolp	The Real World: Austin	Eliminated
15. The Gauntlet III	Derek McCray	Road Rules: Viewers' Revenge	Eliminated
15. The Gauntlet III	Beth Stolarczyk	The Real World: Los Angeles	Eliminated
15. The Gauntlet III	Zach Mann	The Real World: Key West	Eliminated
15. The Gauntlet III	Janelle Casanave	The Real World: Key West	Eliminated
15. The Gauntlet III	Tyrie Ballard	The Real World: Denver	Eliminated
15. The Gauntlet III	Brooke LaBarbera	The Real World: Denver	Eliminated
15. The Gauntlet III	Johnny "Bananas" Devenanzio	The Real World: Key West	Eliminated
15. The Gauntlet III	Tyler Duckworth †	The Real World: Key West	Eliminated
15. The Gauntlet III	Angel Turlington	Road Rules: Viewers' Revenge	Eliminated
15. The Gauntlet III	Alex Smith	The Real World: Denver	Eliminated
16. The Island	Johnny "Bananas" Devenanzio	The Real World: Key West	Winner
16. The Island	Derrick Kosinski	Road Rules: X-Treme	Winner (2)
16. The Island	Kenny Santucci	Fresh Meat	Winner (2)
16. The Island	Evelyn Smith	Fresh Meat	Winner (2)
16. The Island	Jenn Grijalva	The Real World: Denver	Runner-up
16. The Island	Robin Hibbard	The Real World: San Diego (2004)	Runner-up
16. The Island	Ryan Kehoe	Fresh Meat	Runner-up
16. The Island	Paula Meronek	The Real World: Key West	Runner-up
16. The Island	Johanna Botta	The Real World: Austin	Eliminated
16. The Island	KellyAnne Judd	The Real World: Sydney	Eliminated
16. The Island	Dunbar Merrill	The Real World: Sydney	Eliminated
16. The Island	Dan Walsh	Road Rules: Viewers' Revenge	Eliminated
16. The Island	Colie Edison	The Real World: Denver	Eliminated
16. The Island	Cohutta Grindstaff	The Real World: Sydney	Eliminated
16. The Island	Tyrie Ballard	The Real World: Denver	Eliminated
16. The Island	Ashli Robson	The Real World: Sydney	Eliminated
16. The Island	Rachel Robinson	Road Rules: Campus Crawl	Eliminated
16. The Island	Abram Boise	Road Rules: South Pacific	Eliminated
16. The Island	Dave Malinosky	The Real World: Hollywood	Quit
16. The Island	Tonya Cooley	The Real World: Chicago	Eliminated
17. The Duel II	Rachel Robinson	Road Rules: Campus Crawl	Winner (2)
17. The Duel II	Evan Starkman	Fresh Meat	Winner
17. The Duel II	Brad Fiorenza	The Real World: San Diego (2004)	Runner-up
17. The Duel II	Brittini Sherrod	The Real World: Hollywood	Runner-up
17. The Duel II	Aneesa Ferreira	The Real World: Chicago	Third place
17. The Duel II	Mark Long	Road Rules: USA - The First Adventure	Third place
17. The Duel II	Diem Brown †	Fresh Meat	Eliminated
17. The Duel II	Landon Lueck	The Real World: Philadelphia	Eliminated
17. The Duel II	MJ Garrett	The Real World: Philadelphia	Eliminated
17. The Duel II	Tori Hall	Road Rules: Viewers' Revenge	Eliminated
17. The Duel II	Derek McCray	Road Rules: Viewers' Revenge	Eliminated
17. The Duel II	Jenn Grijalva	The Real World: Denver	Eliminated
17. The Duel II	Paula Meronek	The Real World: Key West	Eliminated
17. The Duel II	Dunbar Merrill	The Real World: Sydney	Eliminated
17. The Duel II	Kimberly Alexander	The Real World: Hollywood	Eliminated
17. The Duel II	Eric Banks	Fresh Meat	Eliminated
17. The Duel II	Ruthie Alcaide	The Real World: Hawaii	Eliminated
17. The Duel II	Isaac Stout	The Real World: Sydney	Eliminated
17. The Duel II	Nehemiah Clark	The Real World: Austin	Eliminated
17. The Duel II	Katie Doyle	Road Rules: The Quest	Eliminated
17. The Duel II	Brooke LaBarbera	The Real World: Denver	Eliminated
17. The Duel II	Davis Mallory	The Real World: Denver	Eliminated
17. The Duel II	Robin Hibbard	The Real World: San Diego (2004)	Eliminated
17. The Duel II	Ryan Kehoe	Fresh Meat	Eliminated
17. The Duel II	Shauvon Torres	The Real World: Sydney	Eliminated
17. The Duel II	Nick Brown	The Real World: Hollywood	Eliminated
17. The Duel II	Adam King	The Real World: Paris	Disqualified
17. The Duel II	Chris "CT" Tamburello	The Real World: Paris	Disqualified
18. The Ruins	Johnny "Bananas" Devenanzio	The Real World: Key West	Winner (2)
18. The Ruins	Derrick Kosinski	Road Rules: X-Treme	Winner (3)
18. The Ruins	Susie Meister	Road Rules: Down Under	Winner (2)
18. The Ruins	Kenny Santucci	Fresh Meat	Winner (3)
18. The Ruins	Evan Starkman	Fresh Meat	Winner (2)
18. The Ruins	KellyAnne Judd	The Real World: Sydney	Runner-up
18. The Ruins	Sarah Rice	The Real World: Brooklyn	Runner-up
18. The Ruins	Casey Cooper	Fresh Meat	Eliminated
18. The Ruins	Kimberly Alexander	The Real World: Hollywood	Eliminated
18. The Ruins	Dunbar Merrill	The Real World: Sydney	Eliminated
18. The Ruins	Brad Fiorenza	The Real World: San Diego (2004)	Disqualified
18. The Ruins	Darrell Taylor	Road Rules: Campus Crawl	Disqualified
18. The Ruins	Cohutta Grindstaff	The Real World: Sydney	Eliminated
18. The Ruins	Johanna Botta	The Real World: Austin	Eliminated
18. The Ruins	Veronica Portillo	Road Rules: Semester at Sea	Eliminated
18. The Ruins	Syrus Yarbrough	The Real World: Boston	Eliminated
18. The Ruins	Ibis Nieves	Road Rules: X-Treme	Eliminated
18. The Ruins	Wes Bergmann	The Real World: Austin	Eliminated
18. The Ruins	Katie Doyle	Road Rules: The Quest	Eliminated
18. The Ruins	Tonya Cooley	The Real World: Chicago	Disqualified
18. The Ruins	Danny Jamieson	The Real World: Austin	Eliminated
18. The Ruins	Adam King	The Real World: Paris	Eliminated
18. The Ruins	Brianna Taylor	The Real World: Hollywood	Eliminated
18. The Ruins	Nick Brown	The Real World: Hollywood	Eliminated
18. The Ruins	Evelyn Smith	Fresh Meat	Eliminated
18. The Ruins	Shauvon Torres	The Real World: Sydney	Injured
18. The Ruins	Diem Brown †	Fresh Meat	Eliminated
18. The Ruins	Chet Cannon	The Real World: Brooklyn	Eliminated
19. Fresh Meat II	Landon Lueck	The Real World: Philadelphia	Winner (3)
19. Fresh Meat II	Carley Johnson	Fresh Meat II	Winner
19. Fresh Meat II	Kenny Santucci	Fresh Meat	Runner-up
19. Fresh Meat II	Laurel Stucky	Fresh Meat II	Runner-up
19. Fresh Meat II	Jillian Zoboroski	Road Rules: X-Treme	Third place
19. Fresh Meat II	Pete Connolly	Fresh Meat II	Third place
19. Fresh Meat II	Jenn Grijalva	The Real World: Denver	Fourth place
19. Fresh Meat II	Noor Jehangir	Fresh Meat II	Fourth place
19. Fresh Meat II	Ryan Kehoe	Fresh Meat	Eliminated
19. Fresh Meat II	Theresa Gonzalez	Fresh Meat II	Eliminated
19. Fresh Meat II	Evelyn Smith	Fresh Meat	Eliminated
19. Fresh Meat II	Luke Wolfe	Fresh Meat II	Eliminated
19. Fresh Meat II	Wes Bergmann	The Real World: Austin	Eliminated
19. Fresh Meat II	Mandi Moyer	Fresh Meat II	Eliminated
19. Fresh Meat II	CJ Koegel	The Real World: Cancun	Eliminated
19. Fresh Meat II	Sydney Walker	Fresh Meat II	Eliminated
19. Fresh Meat II	Danny Jamieson	The Real World: Austin	Eliminated
19. Fresh Meat II	Sandy Kang	Fresh Meat II	Eliminated
19. Fresh Meat II	Katelynn Cusanelli	The Real World: Brooklyn	Disqualified
19. Fresh Meat II	Brandon Nelson	Fresh Meat II	Disqualified
19. Fresh Meat II	Paula Meronek	The Real World: Key West	Eliminated
19. Fresh Meat II	Jeff Barr	Fresh Meat II	Eliminated
19. Fresh Meat II	Sarah Rice	The Real World: Brooklyn	Eliminated
19. Fresh Meat II	Vinny Foti	Fresh Meat II	Eliminated
19. Fresh Meat II	Darrell Taylor	Road Rules: Campus Crawl	Eliminated
19. Fresh Meat II	Cara Maria Sorbello	Fresh Meat II	Eliminated
20. Cutthroat	Brad Fiorenza	The Real World: San Diego (2004)	Winner
20. Cutthroat	Dunbar Merrill	The Real World: Sydney	Winner
20. Cutthroat	Tori Hall	Road Rules: Viewers' Revenge	Winner (2)
20. Cutthroat	Tyler Duckworth †	The Real World: Key West	Winner
20. Cutthroat	Cara Maria Sorbello	Fresh Meat II	Runner-up
20. Cutthroat	Laurel Stucky	Fresh Meat II	Runner-up
20. Cutthroat	Luke Wolfe	Fresh Meat II	Runner-up
20. Cutthroat	Abram Boise	Road Rules: South Pacific	Runner-up (DNF)
20. Cutthroat	Sarah Rice	The Real World: Brooklyn	Runner-up (DNF)
20. Cutthroat	Jenn Grijalva	The Real World: Denver	Third place
20. Cutthroat	Emily Schromm	The Real World: D.C.	Third place
20. Cutthroat	Derrick Kosinski	Road Rules: X-Treme	Eliminated
20. Cutthroat	Paula Meronek	The Real World: Key West	Eliminated
20. Cutthroat	Johnny Devenanzio	The Real World: Key West	Eliminated
20. Cutthroat	Theresa Gonzalez	Fresh Meat II	Eliminated
20. Cutthroat	Dan Walsh	Road Rules: Viewers' Revenge	Eliminated
20. Cutthroat	Camila Nakagawa	Spring Break Challenge	Eliminated
20. Cutthroat	Brandon Nelson	Fresh Meat II	Eliminated
20. Cutthroat	Melinda Stolp	The Real World: Austin	Eliminated
20. Cutthroat	Chet Cannon	The Real World: Brooklyn	Injured
20. Cutthroat	Katie Doyle	Road Rules: The Quest	Eliminated
20. Cutthroat	Ty Ruff	The Real World: D.C.	Eliminated
20. Cutthroat	Eric "Big Easy" Banks	Fresh Meat	Eliminated
20. Cutthroat	Ayiiia Elizarraras	The Real World: Cancun	Eliminated
20. Cutthroat	Vinny Foti	Fresh Meat II	Eliminated
20. Cutthroat	Shauvon Torres	The Real World: Sydney	Quit
20. Cutthroat	Mandi Moyer	Fresh Meat II	Eliminated
20. Cutthroat	JD Ordoñez	The Real World: Brooklyn	Eliminated
20. Cutthroat	Derek Chavez	The Real World: Cancun	Eliminated
20. Cutthroat	Emilee Fitzpatrick	The Real World: Cancun	Eliminated

== Seasons 21–30 ==
Season	Contestant	Original series	Finish
21. Rivals	Johnny "Bananas" Devenanzio	The Real World: Key West	Winner (3)
21. Rivals	Tyler Duckworth †	The Real World: Key West	Winner (2)
21. Rivals	Paula Meronek	The Real World: Key West	Winner
21. Rivals	Evelyn Smith	Fresh Meat	Winner (3)
21. Rivals	Wes Bergmann	The Real World: Austin	Runner-up
21. Rivals	Kenny Santucci	Fresh Meat	Runner-up
21. Rivals	Cara Maria Sorbello	Fresh Meat II	Runner-up
21. Rivals	Laurel Stucky	Fresh Meat II	Runner-up
21. Rivals	Leroy Garrett	The Real World: Las Vegas (2011)	Third place (DNF)
21. Rivals	Michael Ross	The Real World: Las Vegas (2011)	Third place (DNF)
21. Rivals	Mandi Moyer	Fresh Meat II	Third place (DNF)
21. Rivals	Jenn Grijalva	The Real World: Denver	Third place (DNF)
21. Rivals	Adam King	The Real World: Paris	Eliminated
21. Rivals	Chris "CT" Tamburello	The Real World: Paris	Eliminated
21. Rivals	Jonna Mannion	The Real World: Cancun	Eliminated
21. Rivals	Jasmine Reynaud	The Real World: Cancun	Eliminated
21. Rivals	Nehemiah Clark	The Real World: Austin	Eliminated
21. Rivals	Evan Starkman	Fresh Meat	Eliminated
21. Rivals	Katelynn Cusanelli	The Real World: Brooklyn	Eliminated
21. Rivals	Sarah Rice	The Real World: Brooklyn	Eliminated
21. Rivals	Brandon Nelson	Fresh Meat II	Eliminated
21. Rivals	Ty Ruff	The Real World: D.C.	Eliminated
21. Rivals	Theresa Gonzalez	Fresh Meat II	Eliminated
21. Rivals	Camila Nakagawa	Spring Break Challenge	Eliminated
21. Rivals	Tyrie Ballard	The Real World: Denver	Eliminated
21. Rivals	Davis Mallory	The Real World: Denver	Eliminated
21. Rivals	Aneesa Ferreira	The Real World: Chicago	Eliminated
21. Rivals	Robin Hibbard	The Real World: San Diego (2004)	Eliminated
21. Rivals	Adam Royer	The Real World: Las Vegas (2011)	Disqualified
22. Battle of the Exes	Johnny "Bananas" Devenanzio	The Real World: Key West	Winner (4)
22. Battle of the Exes	Camila Nakagawa	Spring Break Challenge	Winner
22. Battle of the Exes	Diem Brown †	Fresh Meat	Runner-up
22. Battle of the Exes	Chris "CT" Tamburello	The Real World: Paris	Runner-up
22. Battle of the Exes	Ty Ruff	The Real World: D.C.	Third place
22. Battle of the Exes	Emily Schromm	The Real World: D.C.	Third place
22. Battle of the Exes	Mark Long	Road Rules: USA - The First Adventure	Eliminated
22. Battle of the Exes	Robin Hibbard	The Real World: San Diego (2004)	Eliminated
22. Battle of the Exes	Dunbar Merrill	The Real World: Sydney	Eliminated
22. Battle of the Exes	Paula Meronek	The Real World: Key West	Eliminated
22. Battle of the Exes	Aneesa Ferreira	The Real World: Chicago	Eliminated
22. Battle of the Exes	Rachel Robinson	Road Rules: Campus Crawl	Eliminated
22. Battle of the Exes	Abram Boise	Road Rules: South Pacific	Eliminated
22. Battle of the Exes	Cara Maria Sorbello	Fresh Meat II	Eliminated
22. Battle of the Exes	Tyrie Ballard	The Real World: Denver	Eliminated
22. Battle of the Exes	Jasmine Reynaud	The Real World: Cancun	Eliminated
22. Battle of the Exes	Leroy Garrett	The Real World: Las Vegas (2011)	Eliminated
22. Battle of the Exes	Naomi Defensor	The Real World: Las Vegas (2011)	Eliminated
22. Battle of the Exes	Heather Marter	The Real World: Las Vegas (2011)	Disqualified
22. Battle of the Exes	Dustin Zito	The Real World: Las Vegas (2011)	Injured
22. Battle of the Exes	Wes Bergmann	The Real World: Austin	Eliminated
22. Battle of the Exes	Mandi Moyer	Fresh Meat II	Eliminated
22. Battle of the Exes	Vinny Foti	Fresh Meat II	Disqualified
22. Battle of the Exes	Sarah Rice	The Real World: Brooklyn	Disqualified
22. Battle of the Exes	Priscilla Mendez	The Real World: San Diego (2011)	Eliminated
22. Battle of the Exes	Nate Stodghill	The Real World: San Diego (2011)	Eliminated
23. Battle of the Seasons
23. Battle of the Seasons	Ashley Kelsey	The Real World: San Diego (2011)	Winner
23. Battle of the Seasons	Sam McGinn	The Real World: San Diego (2011)	Winner
23. Battle of the Seasons	Zach Nichols	The Real World: San Diego (2011)	Winner
23. Battle of the Seasons	Frank Sweeney	The Real World: San Diego (2011)	Winner
23. Battle of the Seasons	Trishelle Cannatella	The Real World: Las Vegas (2002)	Runner-up
23. Battle of the Seasons	Dustin Zito	The Real World: Las Vegas (2011)	Runner-up
23. Battle of the Seasons	Chet Cannon	The Real World: Brooklyn	Third place
23. Battle of the Seasons	JD Ordoñez	The Real World: Brooklyn	Third place
23. Battle of the Seasons	Sarah Rice	The Real World: Brooklyn	Third place
23. Battle of the Seasons	Devyn Simone	The Real World: Brooklyn	Third place
23. Battle of the Seasons	Jonna Mannion	The Real World: Cancun	Eliminated
23. Battle of the Seasons	Derek Chavez	The Real World: Cancun	Eliminated
23. Battle of the Seasons	Marie Roda	The Real World: St. Thomas	Eliminated
23. Battle of the Seasons	Robb Schreiber	The Real World: St. Thomas	Eliminated
23. Battle of the Seasons	Nany González	The Real World: Las Vegas (2011)	Eliminated
23. Battle of the Seasons	Alton Williams	The Real World: Las Vegas (2002)	Eliminated
23. Battle of the Seasons	CJ Koegel	The Real World: Cancun	Eliminated
23. Battle of the Seasons	Jasmine Reynaud	The Real World: Cancun	Eliminated
23. Battle of the Seasons	Jemmye Carroll	The Real World: New Orleans (2010)	Eliminated
23. Battle of the Seasons	Ryan Knight †	The Real World: New Orleans (2010)	Eliminated
23. Battle of the Seasons	Laura Waller	The Real World: St. Thomas	Eliminated
23. Battle of the Seasons	Trey Weatherholtz	The Real World: St. Thomas	Eliminated
23. Battle of the Seasons	Preston Roberson-Charles	The Real World: New Orleans (2010)	Eliminated
23. Battle of the Seasons	McKenzie Coburn	The Real World: New Orleans (2010)	Eliminated
23. Battle of the Seasons	Eric "Big Easy" Banks	Fresh Meat	Eliminated
23. Battle of the Seasons	Camila Nakagawa	Spring Break Challenge	Eliminated
23. Battle of the Seasons	Brandon Nelson	Fresh Meat II	Eliminated
23. Battle of the Seasons	Cara Maria Sorbello	Fresh Meat II	Eliminated
23. Battle of the Seasons	Danny Jamieson	The Real World: Austin	Eliminated
23. Battle of the Seasons	Melinda Stolp	The Real World: Austin	Eliminated
23. Battle of the Seasons	Wes Bergmann	The Real World: Austin	Eliminated
23. Battle of the Seasons	Lacey Buehler	The Real World: Austin	Eliminated
24. Rivals II	Wes Bergmann	The Real World: Austin	Winner (2)
24. Rivals II	Chris "CT" Tamburello	The Real World: Paris	Winner
24. Rivals II	Paula Meronek	The Real World: Key West	Winner (2)
24. Rivals II	Emily Schromm	The Real World: D.C.	Winner
24. Rivals II	Johnny "Bananas" Devenanzio	The Real World: Key West	Runner-up
24. Rivals II	Frank Sweeney	The Real World: San Diego (2011)	Runner-up
24. Rivals II	Heather Cooke	The Real World: Las Vegas (2011)	Runner-up
24. Rivals II	Cara Maria Sorbello	Fresh Meat II	Runner-up
24. Rivals II	Marlon Williams	The Real World: Portland	Third place
24. Rivals II	Jordan Wiseley	The Real World: Portland	Third place
24. Rivals II	Jemmye Carroll	The Real World: New Orleans (2010)	Third place
24. Rivals II	Camila Nakagawa	Spring Break Challenge	Third place
24. Rivals II	Diem Brown †	Fresh Meat	Eliminated
24. Rivals II	Aneesa Ferreira	The Real World: Chicago	Eliminated
24. Rivals II	Ryan Knight †	The Real World: New Orleans (2010)	Eliminated
24. Rivals II	Preston Roberson-Charles	The Real World: New Orleans (2010)	Eliminated
24. Rivals II	Nany González	The Real World: Las Vegas (2011)	Eliminated
24. Rivals II	Jonna Mannion	The Real World: Cancun	Eliminated
24. Rivals II	Leroy Garrett	The Real World: Las Vegas (2011)	Eliminated
24. Rivals II	Ty Ruff	The Real World: D.C.	Eliminated
24. Rivals II	Theresa Gonzalez	Fresh Meat II	Eliminated
24. Rivals II	Jasmine Reynaud	The Real World: Cancun	Eliminated
24. Rivals II	Zach Nichols	The Real World: San Diego (2011)	Eliminated
24. Rivals II	Trey Weatherholtz	The Real World: St. Thomas	Eliminated
24. Rivals II	Derek Chavez	The Real World: Cancun	Eliminated
24. Rivals II	Robb Schreiber	The Real World: St. Thomas	Eliminated
24. Rivals II	Trishelle Cannatella	The Real World: Las Vegas (2002)	Quit
24. Rivals II	Sarah Rice	The Real World: Brooklyn	Disqualified
24. Rivals II	Jessica McCain	The Real World: Portland	Eliminated
24. Rivals II	Anastasia Miller	The Real World: Portland	Eliminated
24. Rivals II	Tyrie Ballard	The Real World: Denver	Eliminated
24. Rivals II	Dunbar Merrill	The Real World: Sydney	Eliminated
24. Rivals II	Naomi Defensor	The Real World: Las Vegas (2011)	Quit
25. Free Agents	Johnny "Bananas" Devenanzio	The Real World: Key West	Winner (5)
25. Free Agents	Laurel Stucky	Fresh Meat II	Winner
25. Free Agents	Nany González	The Real World: Las Vegas (2011)	Runner-up
25. Free Agents	Johnny Reilly	The Real World: Portland	Runner-up
25. Free Agents	Zach Nichols	The Real World: San Diego (2011)	Third place
25. Free Agents	Devyn Simone	The Real World: Brooklyn	Third place
25. Free Agents	Theresa Gonzalez	Fresh Meat II	Eliminated
25. Free Agents	Chris "CT" Tamburello	The Real World: Paris	Eliminated
25. Free Agents	Leroy Garrett	The Real World: Las Vegas (2011)	Eliminated
25. Free Agents	Cara Maria Sorbello	Fresh Meat II	Eliminated
25. Free Agents	Cohutta Grindstaff	The Real World: Sydney	Eliminated
25. Free Agents	Jessica McCain	The Real World: Portland	Eliminated
25. Free Agents	Aneesa Ferreira	The Real World: Chicago	Eliminated
25. Free Agents	Preston Roberson-Charles	The Real World: New Orleans (2010)	Eliminated
25. Free Agents	Jonna Mannion	The Real World: Cancun	Eliminated
25. Free Agents	Jordan Wiseley	The Real World: Portland	Eliminated
25. Free Agents	Camila Nakagawa	Spring Break Challenge	Eliminated
25. Free Agents	Brandon Swift	The Real World: St. Thomas	Eliminated
25. Free Agents	Jasmine Reynaud	The Real World: Cancun	Eliminated
25. Free Agents	Isaac Stout	The Real World: Sydney	Eliminated
25. Free Agents	LaToya Jackson	The Real World: St. Thomas	Eliminated
25. Free Agents	Brandon Nelson	Fresh Meat II	Eliminated
25. Free Agents	Nia Moore	The Real World: Portland	Eliminated
25. Free Agents	Frank Sweeney	The Real World: San Diego (2011)	Injured
25. Free Agents	Emilee Fitzpatrick	The Real World: Cancun	Eliminated
25. Free Agents	Dustin Zito	The Real World: Las Vegas (2011)	Eliminated
25. Free Agents	Chet Cannon	The Real World: Brooklyn	Injured
25. Free Agents	Jemmye Carroll	The Real World: New Orleans (2010)	Eliminated
26. Battle of the Exes II	Sarah Rice	The Real World: Brooklyn	Winner
26. Battle of the Exes II	Jordan Wiseley	The Real World: Portland	Winner
26. Battle of the Exes II	Leroy Garrett	The Real World: Las Vegas (2011)	Runner-up
26. Battle of the Exes II	Theresa Gonzalez	Fresh Meat II	Runner-up
26. Battle of the Exes II	Jenna Compono	Real World: Ex-Plosion	Third place (DNF)
26. Battle of the Exes II	Jay Mitchell	Real World: Ex-Plosion	Third place (DNF)
26. Battle of the Exes II	Johnny "Bananas" Devenanzio	The Real World: Key West	Eliminated
26. Battle of the Exes II	Nany González	The Real World: Las Vegas (2011)	Eliminated
26. Battle of the Exes II	Nia Moore	The Real World: Portland	Disqualified
26. Battle of the Exes II	Wes Bergmann	The Real World: Austin	Eliminated
26. Battle of the Exes II	Jonna Mannion	The Real World: Cancun	Eliminated
26. Battle of the Exes II	Zach Nichols	The Real World: San Diego (2011)	Eliminated
26. Battle of the Exes II	Johnny Reilly	The Real World: Portland	Eliminated
26. Battle of the Exes II	Averey Tressler	The Real World: Portland	Eliminated
26. Battle of the Exes II	Brittany Baldassari	Are You the One? 1	Eliminated
26. Battle of the Exes II	Adam Kuhn	Are You the One? 1	Eliminated
26. Battle of the Exes II	Jemmye Carroll	The Real World: New Orleans (2010)	Disqualified
26. Battle of the Exes II	Ryan Knight †	The Real World: New Orleans (2010)	Injured
26. Battle of the Exes II	John "JJ" Jacobs	Are You the One? 1	Eliminated
26. Battle of the Exes II	Simone Kelly	Are You the One? 1	Eliminated
26. Battle of the Exes II	Diem Brown †	Fresh Meat	Injured
26. Battle of the Exes II	Chris "CT" Tamburello	The Real World: Paris	Left
26. Battle of the Exes II	Thomas Buell	Real World: Ex-Plosion	Eliminated
26. Battle of the Exes II	Hailey Chivers	Real World: Ex-Plosion	Eliminated
26. Battle of the Exes II	Jessica McCain	The Real World: Portland	Eliminated
26. Battle of the Exes II	Dustin Zito	The Real World: Las Vegas (2011)	Eliminated
27. Battle of the Bloodlines	Cara Maria Sorbello	Fresh Meat II	Winner
27. Battle of the Bloodlines	Jamie Banks	Battle of the Bloodlines	Winner
27. Battle of the Bloodlines	Cory Wharton	Real World: Ex-Plosion	Runner-up
27. Battle of the Bloodlines	Mitch Reid	Battle of the Bloodlines	Runner-up
27. Battle of the Bloodlines	Jenna Compono	Real World: Ex-Plosion	Third place
27. Battle of the Bloodlines	Brianna Julig	Battle of the Bloodlines	Third place
27. Battle of the Bloodlines	Aneesa Ferreira	The Real World: Chicago	Eliminated
27. Battle of the Bloodlines	Rianna Polin	Battle of the Bloodlines	Eliminated
27. Battle of the Bloodlines	Johnny "Bananas" Devenanzio	The Real World: Key West	Eliminated
27. Battle of the Bloodlines	Vince Gliatta	Battle of the Bloodlines	Eliminated
27. Battle of the Bloodlines	Abram Boise	Road Rules: South Pacific	Eliminated
27. Battle of the Bloodlines	Mike Boise	Battle of the Bloodlines	Eliminated
27. Battle of the Bloodlines	KellyAnne Judd	The Real World: Sydney	Eliminated
27. Battle of the Bloodlines	Anthony Cuomo	Battle of the Bloodlines	Eliminated
27. Battle of the Bloodlines	Thomas Buell	Real World: Ex-Plosion	Eliminated
27. Battle of the Bloodlines	Stephen Buell	Battle of the Bloodlines	Eliminated
27. Battle of the Bloodlines	Nany González	The Real World: Las Vegas (2011)	Eliminated
27. Battle of the Bloodlines	Nicole Ramos	Battle of the Bloodlines	Eliminated
27. Battle of the Bloodlines	Dario Medrano	Are You the One? 2	Eliminated
27. Battle of the Bloodlines	Raphy Medrano	Battle of the Bloodlines	Eliminated
27. Battle of the Bloodlines	Tony Raines	Real World: Skeletons	Injured
27. Battle of the Bloodlines	Shane Raines	Battle of the Bloodlines	Disqualified
27. Battle of the Bloodlines	Camila Nakagawa	Spring Break Challenge	Eliminated
27. Battle of the Bloodlines	Larissa Nakagawa	Battle of the Bloodlines	Eliminated
27. Battle of the Bloodlines	Leroy Garrett	The Real World: Las Vegas (2011)	Disqualified
27. Battle of the Bloodlines	Candice Fowler	Battle of the Bloodlines	Injured
27. Battle of the Bloodlines	Cohutta Grindstaff	The Real World: Sydney	Eliminated
27. Battle of the Bloodlines	Jill Tuttle	Battle of the Bloodlines	Eliminated
27. Battle of the Bloodlines	Christina LeBlanc	Are You the One? 2	Eliminated
27. Battle of the Bloodlines	Emily Reese	Battle of the Bloodlines	Eliminated
28. Rivals III	Johnny "Bananas" Devenanzio	The Real World: Key West	Winner (6)
28. Rivals III	Sarah Rice	The Real World: Brooklyn	Winner (2)
28. Rivals III	Jenna Compono	Real World: Ex-Plosion	Runner-up
28. Rivals III	Vince Gliatta	Battle of the Bloodlines	Runner-up
28. Rivals III	Cheyenne Floyd	Are You the One? 3	Third place
28. Rivals III	Devin Walker	Are You the One? 3	Third place
28. Rivals III	Dario Medrano	Are You the One? 2	Eliminated
28. Rivals III	Nicole Ramos	Battle of the Bloodlines	Eliminated
28. Rivals III	Wes Bergmann	The Real World: Austin	Eliminated
28. Rivals III	Nany González	The Real World: Las Vegas (2011)	Eliminated
28. Rivals III	Christina LeBlanc	Are You the One? 2	Eliminated
28. Rivals III	Nate Siebenmark	Are You the One? 2	Eliminated
28. Rivals III	Ashley Mitchell	Real World: Ex-Plosion	Eliminated
28. Rivals III	Cory Wharton	Real World: Ex-Plosion	Eliminated
28. Rivals III	Jamie Banks	Battle of the Bloodlines	Eliminated
28. Rivals III	KellyAnne Judd	The Real World: Sydney	Eliminated
28. Rivals III	Camila Nakagawa	Spring Break Challenge	Disqualified
28. Rivals III	Tony Raines	Real World: Skeletons	Disqualified
28. Rivals III	Amanda Garcia	Are You the One? 3	Eliminated
28. Rivals III	Nelson Thomas	Are You the One? 3	Eliminated
28. Rivals III	Thomas Buell	Real World: Ex-Plosion	Quit
28. Rivals III	Simone Kelly	Are You the One? 1	Quit
28. Rivals III	Jessica McCain	The Real World: Portland	Eliminated
28. Rivals III	Johnny Reilly	The Real World: Portland	Eliminated
28. Rivals III	Briana LaCuesta	Are You the One? 2	Disqualified
28. Rivals III	Brandon Tindel	Are You the One? 2	Quit
28. Rivals III	Leroy Garrett	The Real World: Las Vegas (2011)	Injured
28. Rivals III	Averey Tressler	The Real World: Portland	Disqualified
29. Invasion of the Champions	Ashley Mitchell	Real World: Ex-Plosion	Winner
29. Invasion of the Champions	Chris "CT" Tamburello	The Real World: Paris	Winner (2)
29. Invasion of the Champions	Camila Nakagawa	Spring Break Challenge	Runner-up
29. Invasion of the Champions	Nelson Thomas	Are You the One? 3	Runner-up
29. Invasion of the Champions	Nicole Zanatta	Real World: Skeletons	Third place
29. Invasion of the Champions	Cory Wharton	Real World: Ex-Plosion	Third place
29. Invasion of the Champions	Laurel Stucky	Fresh Meat II	Eliminated
29. Invasion of the Champions	Darrell Taylor	Road Rules: Campus Crawl	Eliminated
29. Invasion of the Champions	Amanda Garcia	Are You the One? 3	Eliminated
29. Invasion of the Champions	Shane Landrum	Road Rules: Campus Crawl	Eliminated
29. Invasion of the Champions	Hunter Barfield	Are You the One? 3	Eliminated
29. Invasion of the Champions	Jenna Compono	Real World: Ex-Plosion	Eliminated
29. Invasion of the Champions	Johnny "Bananas" Devenanzio	The Real World: Key West	Eliminated
29. Invasion of the Champions	Cara Maria Sorbello	Fresh Meat II	Eliminated
29. Invasion of the Champions	Sylvia Elsrode	Real World: Skeletons	Eliminated
29. Invasion of the Champions	Dario Medrano	Are You the One? 2	Eliminated
29. Invasion of the Champions	Ashley Kelsey	The Real World: San Diego (2011)	Eliminated
29. Invasion of the Champions	Zach Nichols	The Real World: San Diego (2011)	Eliminated
29. Invasion of the Champions	Kailah Casillas	Real World: Go Big or Go Home	Eliminated
29. Invasion of the Champions	Tony Raines	Real World: Skeletons	Eliminated
29. Invasion of the Champions	Anthony Bartolotte	Are You the One? 2	Eliminated
29. Invasion of the Champions	LaToya Jackson	The Real World: St. Thomas	Eliminated
29. Invasion of the Champions	Theo Bradley	Real World Seattle: Bad Blood	Quit
29. Invasion of the Champions	Anika Rashaun †	Real World Seattle: Bad Blood	Eliminated
29. Invasion of the Champions	Marie Roda	The Real World: St. Thomas	Eliminated
29. Invasion of the Champions	Bruno Bettencourt	Real World: Skeletons	Eliminated
30. XXX: Dirty 30	Camila Nakagawa	Spring Break Challenge	Winner (2)
30. XXX: Dirty 30	Jordan Wiseley	The Real World: Portland	Winner (2)
30. XXX: Dirty 30	Derrick Kosinski	Road Rules: X-Treme	Runner-up
30. XXX: Dirty 30	Cara Maria Sorbello	Fresh Meat II	Runner-up
30. XXX: Dirty 30	Tori Deal	Are You the One? 4	Third place
30. XXX: Dirty 30	Chris "CT" Tamburello	The Real World: Paris	Third place
30. XXX: Dirty 30	Tony Raines	Real World: Skeletons	Eliminated
30. XXX: Dirty 30	Hunter Barfield	Are You the One? 3	Eliminated
30. XXX: Dirty 30	Kailah Casillas	Real World: Go Big or Go Home	Eliminated
30. XXX: Dirty 30	Jenna Compono	Real World: Ex-Plosion	Eliminated
30. XXX: Dirty 30	Jemmye Carroll	The Real World: New Orleans (2010)	Eliminated
30. XXX: Dirty 30	Johnny "Bananas" Devenanzio	The Real World: Key West	Eliminated
30. XXX: Dirty 30	Aneesa Ferreira	The Real World: Chicago	Eliminated
30. XXX: Dirty 30	Leroy Garrett	The Real World: Las Vegas (2011)	Eliminated
30. XXX: Dirty 30	Dario Medrano	Are You the One? 2	Eliminated
30. XXX: Dirty 30	Veronica Portillo	Road Rules: Semester at Sea	Eliminated
30. XXX: Dirty 30	Britni Thornton	Are You the One? 3	Eliminated
30. XXX: Dirty 30	Nelson Thomas	Are You the One? 3	Disqualified
30. XXX: Dirty 30	Nicole Ramos	Battle of the Bloodlines	Eliminated
30. XXX: Dirty 30	Marie Roda	The Real World: St. Thomas	Eliminated
30. XXX: Dirty 30	Cory Wharton	Real World: Ex-Plosion	Eliminated
30. XXX: Dirty 30	Chris "Ammo" Ammon Hall	Real World: Go Big or Go Home	Eliminated
30. XXX: Dirty 30	Amanda Garcia	Are You the One? 3	Eliminated
30. XXX: Dirty 30	Darrell Taylor	Road Rules: Campus Crawl	Eliminated
30. XXX: Dirty 30	Briana LaCuesta	Are You the One? 2	Eliminated
30. XXX: Dirty 30	Derrick Henry	Are You the One? 5	Eliminated
30. XXX: Dirty 30	LaToya Jackson	The Real World: St. Thomas	Eliminated
30. XXX: Dirty 30	Devin Walker	Are You the One? 3	Eliminated
30. XXX: Dirty 30	Simone Kelly	Are You the One? 1	Disqualified
30. XXX: Dirty 30	Shane Raines	Battle of the Bloodlines	Disqualified
30. XXX: Dirty 30	Ashley Mitchell	Real World: Ex-Plosion	Quit

== Seasons 31–40 ==
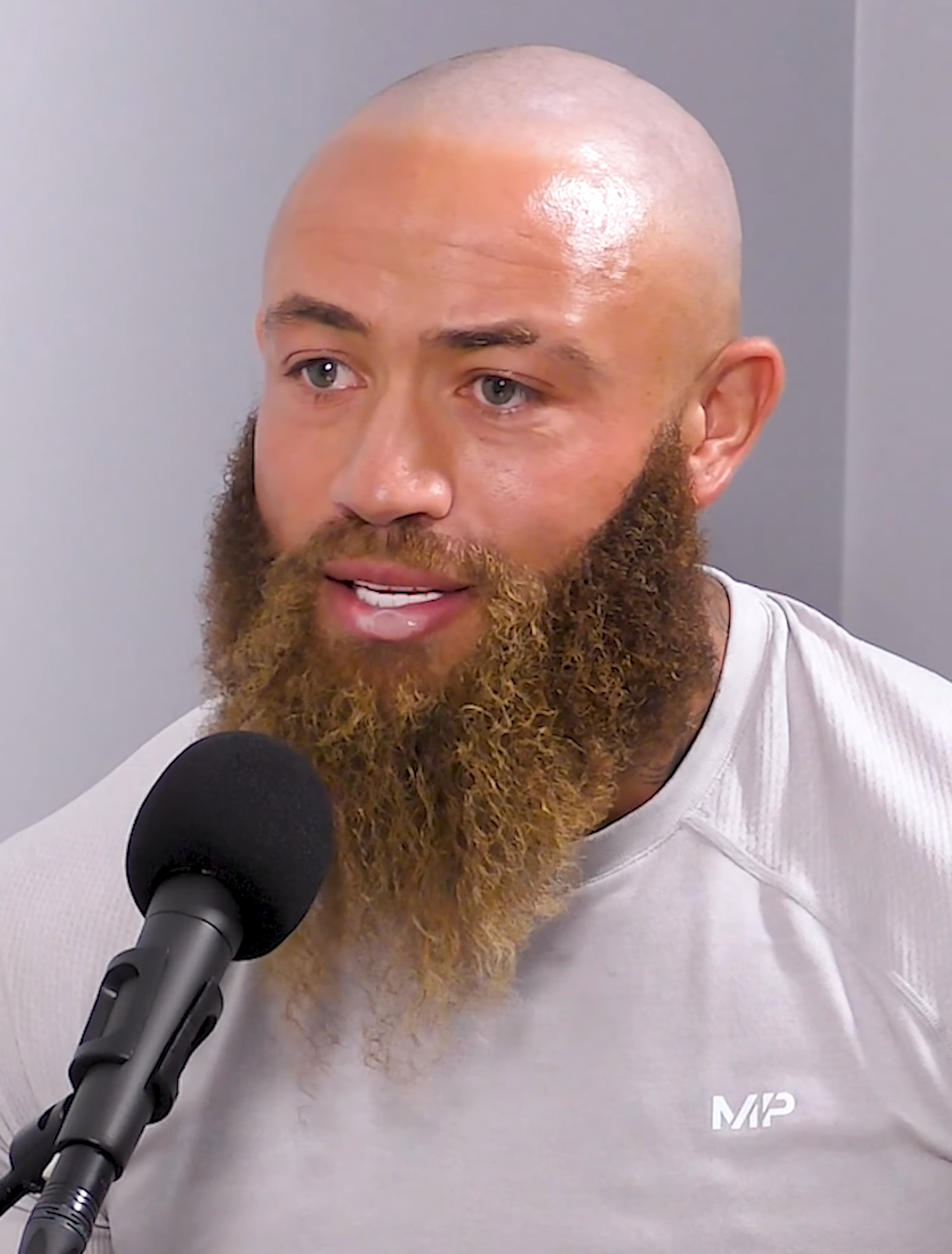
Ashley Cain, War of the Worlds

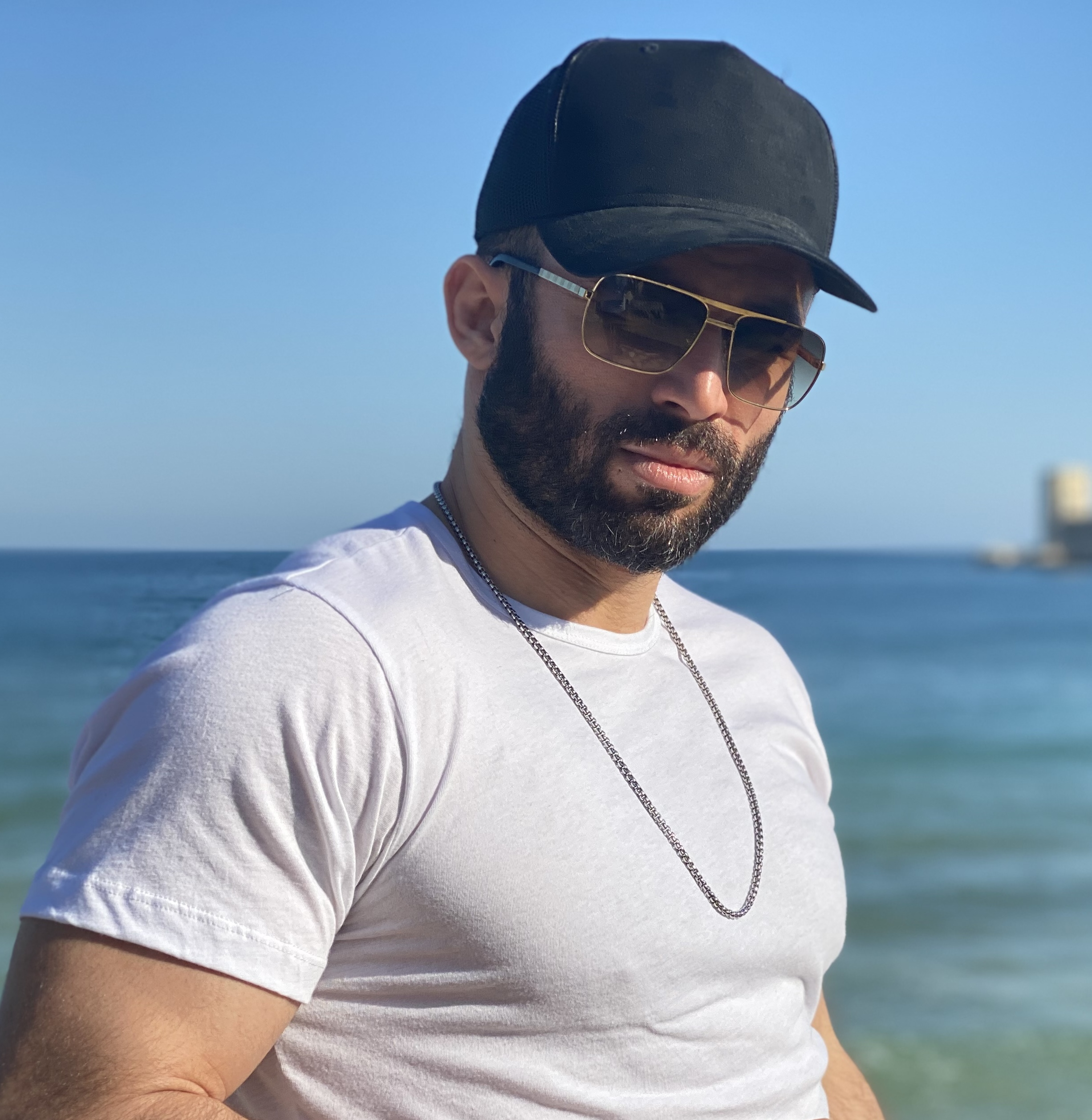
Turabi "Turbo" Çamkıran, 4 times contestant

Season	Contestant	Original series	Finish
31. Vendettas	Cara Maria Sorbello	Fresh Meat II	Winner (2)
31. Vendettas	Zach Nichols	The Real World: San Diego (2011)	Runner-up
31. Vendettas	Kyle Christie	Geordie Shore	Third place
31. Vendettas	Kailah Casillas	Real World: Go Big or Go Home	Fourth place
31. Vendettas	Leroy Garrett	The Real World: Las Vegas (2011)	Fifth place
31. Vendettas	Tony Raines	Real World: Skeletons	Sixth place
31. Vendettas	Kam Williams	Are You the One? 5	Seventh place
31. Vendettas	Nicole Zanatta	Real World: Skeletons	Eighth place (DNF)
31. Vendettas	Brad Fiorenza	The Real World: San Diego (2004)	Eliminated
31. Vendettas	Nelson Thomas	Are You the One? 3	Eliminated
31. Vendettas	Jemmye Carroll	The Real World: New Orleans (2010)	Eliminated
31. Vendettas	Devin Walker-Molaghan	Are You the One? 3	Eliminated
31. Vendettas	Natalie Negrotti	Big Brother 18	Eliminated
31. Vendettas	Britni Thornton	Are You the One? 3	Eliminated
31. Vendettas	Kayleigh Morris	Ex on the Beach UK 2	Quit
31. Vendettas	Johnny "Bananas" Devenanzio	The Real World: Key West	Eliminated
31. Vendettas	Marie Roda	The Real World: St. Thomas	Eliminated
31. Vendettas	Joss Mooney	Ex on the Beach UK 1	Eliminated
31. Vendettas	Veronica Portillo	Road Rules: Semester at Sea	Injured
31. Vendettas	Shane Landrum	Road Rules: Campus Crawl	Eliminated
31. Vendettas	Victor Arroyo	Big Brother 18	Eliminated
31. Vendettas	Sylvia Elsrode	Real World: Skeletons	Injured
31. Vendettas	Melissa Reeves	Ex on the Beach UK 2	Eliminated
31. Vendettas	Alicia Wright	Are You the One? 5	Eliminated
31. Vendettas	Cory Wharton	Real World: Ex-Plosion	Eliminated
31. Vendettas	Eddie Williams	Are You the One? 5	Removed
31. Vendettas	Rogan O'Connor	Ex on the Beach UK 2	Eliminated
31. Vendettas	Nicole Ramos	Battle of the Bloodlines	Eliminated
32. Final Reckoning	Hunter Barfield	Are You the One? 3	Winner
32. Final Reckoning	Ashley Mitchell	Real World: Ex-Plosion	Winner (2)
32. Final Reckoning	Sylvia Elsrode	Real World: Skeletons	Runner-up
32. Final Reckoning	Joss Mooney	Ex on the Beach UK 1	Runner-up
32. Final Reckoning	Paulie Calafiore	Big Brother 18	Third place
32. Final Reckoning	Natalie Negrotti	Big Brother 18	Third place
32. Final Reckoning	Marie Roda	The Real World: St. Thomas	Fourth place
32. Final Reckoning	Cara Maria Sorbello	Fresh Meat II	Fourth place
32. Final Reckoning	Johnny "Bananas" Devenanzio	The Real World: Key West	Eliminated
32. Final Reckoning	Tony Raines	Real World: Skeletons	Eliminated
32. Final Reckoning	Kayleigh Morris	Ex on the Beach UK 2	Eliminated
32. Final Reckoning	Kam Williams	Are You the One? 5	Eliminated
32. Final Reckoning	Kyle Christie	Geordie Shore	Eliminated
32. Final Reckoning	Brad Fiorenza	The Real World: San Diego (2004)	Eliminated
32. Final Reckoning	Shane Landrum	Road Rules: Campus Crawl	Eliminated
32. Final Reckoning	Nelson Thomas	Are You the One? 3	Eliminated
32. Final Reckoning	Devin Walker-Molaghan	Are You the One? 3	Disqualified
32. Final Reckoning	Cory Wharton	Real World: Ex-Plosion	Disqualified
32. Final Reckoning	Jozea Flores	Big Brother 18	Eliminated
32. Final Reckoning	Amanda Garcia	Are You the One? 3	Disqualified
32. Final Reckoning	Zach Nichols	The Real World: San Diego (2011)	Injured
32. Final Reckoning	Da'Vonne Rogers	Big Brother 17	Eliminated
32. Final Reckoning	Angela Babicz	Bad Girls Club: Twisted Sisters	Eliminated
32. Final Reckoning	Faith Stowers	Vanderpump Rules	Eliminated
32. Final Reckoning	Tori Deal	Are You the One? 4	Eliminated
32. Final Reckoning	Derrick Henry	Are You the One? 5	Eliminated
32. Final Reckoning	Veronica Portillo	Road Rules: Semester at Sea	Eliminated
32. Final Reckoning	Chris "CT" Tamburello	The Real World: Paris	Eliminated
32. Final Reckoning	Jemmye Carroll	The Real World: New Orleans (2010)	Eliminated
32. Final Reckoning	Jenna Compono	Real World: Ex-Plosion	Eliminated
32. Final Reckoning	Chuck Mowery	Are You the One? 3	Eliminated
32. Final Reckoning	Britni Thornton	Are You the One? 3	Eliminated
32. Final Reckoning	Kailah Casillas	Real World: Go Big or Go Home	Disqualified
32. Final Reckoning	Melissa Reeves	Ex on the Beach UK 2	Disqualified
33. War of the Worlds
33. War of the Worlds	Turabi "Turbo" Çamkıran	Survivor Turkey 8	Winner
33. War of the Worlds	Theo Campbell	Love Island UK 3	Runner-up
33. War of the Worlds	Wes Bergmann	The Real World: Austin	Third place
33. War of the Worlds	Natalie "Ninja" Duran	American Ninja Warrior	Fourth place
33. War of the Worlds	Cara Maria Sorbello	Fresh Meat II	Fifth place
33. War of the Worlds	Hunter Barfield	Are You the One? 3	Sixth place
33. War of the Worlds	Mattie Lynn Breaux	Party Down South	Seventh place (DNF)
33. War of the Worlds	Georgia Harrison	Love Island UK 3	Eighth place (DNF)
33. War of the Worlds	Paulie Calafiore	Big Brother 18	Eliminated
33. War of the Worlds	Da'Vonne Rogers	Big Brother 17	Eliminated
33. War of the Worlds	Dee Nguyen	Geordie Shore	Eliminated
33. War of the Worlds	Kyle Christie	Geordie Shore	Eliminated
33. War of the Worlds	Nany González	The Real World: Las Vegas (2011)	Eliminated
33. War of the Worlds	Stephen Bear	Celebrity Big Brother UK 18	Eliminated
33. War of the Worlds	Kam Williams	Are You the One? 5	Eliminated
33. War of the Worlds	Ashley Cain	Ex on the Beach UK 1	Eliminated
33. War of the Worlds	Jenna Compono	Real World: Ex-Plosion	Eliminated
33. War of the Worlds	Gus Smyrnios	Floribama Shore	Eliminated
33. War of the Worlds	Amanda Garcia	Are You the One? 3	Eliminated
33. War of the Worlds	Josh Martinez	Big Brother 19	Eliminated
33. War of the Worlds	Leroy Garrett	The Real World: Las Vegas (2011)	Eliminated
33. War of the Worlds	Shaleen Sutherland	The Bachelor Canada 3	Eliminated
33. War of the Worlds	Zach Nichols	The Real World: San Diego (2011)	Eliminated
33. War of the Worlds	Zahida Allen	Ex on the Beach UK 6	Eliminated
33. War of the Worlds	Chris "CT" Tamburello	The Real World: Paris	Eliminated
33. War of the Worlds	Julia Nolan	Big Brother 17	Eliminated
33. War of the Worlds	Natalie Negrotti	Big Brother 18	Eliminated
33. War of the Worlds	João Paulo "JP" Andreade	Ex on the Beach Brazil 2	Eliminated
33. War of the Worlds	Johnny "Bananas" Devenanzio	The Real World: Key West	Eliminated
33. War of the Worlds	Morgan Willett	Big Brother: Over The Top	Eliminated
33. War of the Worlds	Ashley Mitchell	Real World: Ex-Plosion	Eliminated
33. War of the Worlds	Chase McNary	The Bachelorette 12	Eliminated
33. War of the Worlds	Liz Nolan	Big Brother 17	Eliminated
33. War of the Worlds	Alan Valdez	Telemundo	Injured
34. War of the Worlds 2	Chris "CT" Tamburello	The Real World: Paris	Winner (3)
34. War of the Worlds 2	Jordan Wiseley	The Real World: Portland	Winner (3)
34. War of the Worlds 2	Dee Nguyen	Geordie Shore	Winner
34. War of the Worlds 2	Rogan O'Connor	Ex on the Beach UK 2	Winner
34. War of the Worlds 2	Cara Maria Sorbello	Fresh Meat II	Runner-up
34. War of the Worlds 2	Natalie "Ninja" Duran	American Ninja Warrior	Runner-up
34. War of the Worlds 2	Paulie Calafiore	Big Brother 18	Runner-up
34. War of the Worlds 2	Zach Nichols	The Real World: San Diego (2011)	Runner-up
34. War of the Worlds 2	Ashley Mitchell	Real World: Ex-Plosion	Finalist
34. War of the Worlds 2	Kam Williams	Are You the One? 5	Finalist
34. War of the Worlds 2	Tori Deal	Are You the One? 4	Finalist
34. War of the Worlds 2	Leroy Garrett	The Real World: Las Vegas (2011)	Finalist
34. War of the Worlds 2	Nany González	The Real World: Las Vegas (2011)	Eliminated
34. War of the Worlds 2	Josh Martinez	Big Brother 19	Eliminated
34. War of the Worlds 2	Joss Mooney	Ex on the Beach UK 1	Eliminated
34. War of the Worlds 2	Kayleigh Morris	Ex on the Beach UK 2	Eliminated
34. War of the Worlds 2	Jenny West	Survival of the Fittest	Eliminated
34. War of the Worlds 2	Theo Campbell	Love Island UK 3	Eliminated
34. War of the Worlds 2	Georgia Harrison	Love Island UK 3	Eliminated
34. War of the Worlds 2	Turabi "Turbo" Çamkıran	Survivor Turkey 8	Disqualified
34. War of the Worlds 2	Idris Virgo	Love Island UK 4	Eliminated
34. War of the Worlds 2	Kyle Christie	Geordie Shore	Eliminated
34. War of the Worlds 2	Esther Falana	BKCHAT LDN	Eliminated
34. War of the Worlds 2	Stephen Bear	Celebrity Big Brother UK 18	Eliminated
34. War of the Worlds 2	Nicole Bass	Ex on the Beach UK 6	Eliminated
34. War of the Worlds 2	Johnny "Bananas" Devenanzio	The Real World: Key West	Eliminated
34. War of the Worlds 2	Laurel Stucky	Fresh Meat II	Eliminated
34. War of the Worlds 2	Wes Bergmann	The Real World: Austin	Eliminated
34. War of the Worlds 2	Tula "Big T" Fazakerley	Shipwrecked: Battle of the Islands	Eliminated
34. War of the Worlds 2	Faith Stowers	Vanderpump Rules	Quit
34. War of the Worlds 2	Zahida Allen	Ex on the Beach UK 6	Quit
34. War of the Worlds 2	Sean Lineker	Shipwrecked: Battle of the Islands	Eliminated
35. Total Madness	Jenny West	Survival of the Fittest	Winner
35. Total Madness	Johnny "Bananas" Devenanzio	The Real World: Key West	Winner (7)
35. Total Madness	Kaycee Clark	Big Brother 20	Runner-up
35. Total Madness	Kyle Christie	Geordie Shore	Runner-up
35. Total Madness	Cory Wharton	Real World: Ex-Plosion	Third place
35. Total Madness	Bayleigh Dayton	Big Brother 20	Third place (DNF)
35. Total Madness	Faysal "Fessy" Shafaat	Big Brother 20	Fourth place
35. Total Madness	Melissa Reeves	Ex on the Beach UK 2	Fourth place (DNF)
35. Total Madness	Rogan O'Connor	Ex on the Beach UK 2	Fifth place
35. Total Madness	Nelson Thomas	Are You the One? 3	Eliminated
35. Total Madness	Dee Nguyen	Geordie Shore 17	Eliminated
35. Total Madness	Josh Martinez	Big Brother 19	Eliminated
35. Total Madness	Aneesa Ferreira	The Real World: Chicago	Eliminated
35. Total Madness	Nany González	The Real World: Las Vegas (2011)	Eliminated
35. Total Madness	Christopher "Swaggy C" Williams	Big Brother 20	Eliminated
35. Total Madness	Mattie Lynn Breaux	Party Down South	Eliminated
35. Total Madness	Wes Bergmann	The Real World: Austin	Eliminated
35. Total Madness	Jenna Compono	Real World: Ex-Plosion	Eliminated
35. Total Madness	Kailah Casillas	Real World: Go Big or Go Home	Eliminated
35. Total Madness	Tula "Big T" Fazakerley	Shipwrecked: Battle of the Islands	Injured
35. Total Madness	Stephen Bear	Celebrity Big Brother UK 18	Eliminated
35. Total Madness	Jordan Wiseley	The Real World: Portland	Eliminated
35. Total Madness	Tori Deal	Are You the One? 4	Eliminated
35. Total Madness	Justin "Jay" Starrett	Survivor: Millennials vs. Gen X	Injured
35. Total Madness	Ashley Mitchell	Real World: Ex-Plosion	Eliminated
35. Total Madness	Chris "CT" Tamburello	The Real World: Paris	Eliminated
35. Total Madness	Jenn Lee	The Amazing Race 29	Eliminated
35. Total Madness	Asaf Goren	So You Think You Can Dance 12	Eliminated
36. Double Agents
36. Double Agents	Amber Borzotra	Big Brother 16	Winner
36. Double Agents	Chris "CT" Tamburello	The Real World: Paris	Winner (4)
36. Double Agents	Cory Wharton	Real World: Ex-Plosion	Runner-up
36. Double Agents	Kam Williams	Are You the One? 5	Runner-up
36. Double Agents	Leroy Garrett	The Real World: Las Vegas (2011)	Third place
36. Double Agents	Nany González	The Real World: Las Vegas (2011)	Third place
36. Double Agents	Kaycee Clark	Big Brother 20	Fourth place (DNF)
36. Double Agents	Faysal "Fessy" Shafaat	Big Brother 20	Fourth place (DNF)
36. Double Agents	Kyle Christie	Geordie Shore	Injured
36. Double Agents	Tula "Big T" Fazakerley	Shipwrecked: Battle of the Islands	Eliminated
36. Double Agents	Aneesa Ferreira	The Real World: Chicago	Eliminated
36. Double Agents	Darrell Taylor	Road Rules: Campus Crawl	Eliminated
36. Double Agents	Gabby Allen	Love Island UK 3	Eliminated
36. Double Agents	Nam Vo	Ultimate Beastmaster 1	Injured
36. Double Agents	Josh Martinez	Big Brother 19	Eliminated
36. Double Agents	Devin Walker-Molaghan	Are You the One? 3	Eliminated
36. Double Agents	Lolo Jones	Olympic Games	Quit
36. Double Agents	Amber Martinez	Are You the One? 8	Eliminated
36. Double Agents	Theresa Gonzalez	Fresh Meat II	Eliminated
36. Double Agents	Demetrius "Mechie" Harris	Ex on the Beach US 3	Eliminated
36. Double Agents	Justin "Jay" Starrett	Survivor: Millennials vs. Gen X	Eliminated
36. Double Agents	Ashley Mitchell	Real World: Ex-Plosion	Eliminated
36. Double Agents	Lio Rush	WWE NXT	Quit
36. Double Agents	Tori Deal	Are You the One? 4	Eliminated
36. Double Agents	Natalie Anderson	The Amazing Race 21	Injured
36. Double Agents	Nelson Thomas	Are You the One? 3	Eliminated
36. Double Agents	Olivia "Liv" Jawando	Shipwrecked: Battle of the Islands	Injured
36. Double Agents	Wes Bergmann	The Real World: Austin	Eliminated
36. Double Agents	Nicole Zanatta	Real World: Skeletons	Injured
36. Double Agents	Joseph Allen	America's Got Talent 14	Eliminated
37. Spies, Lies & Allies	Chris "CT" Tamburello	The Real World: Paris	Winner (5)
37. Spies, Lies & Allies	Kaycee Clark	Big Brother 20	Winner
37. Spies, Lies & Allies	Kyle Christie	Geordie Shore	Runner-up
37. Spies, Lies & Allies	Tori Deal	Are You the One? 4	Runner-up
37. Spies, Lies & Allies	Devin Walker-Molaghan	Are You the One? 3	Third place
37. Spies, Lies & Allies	Emy Alupei	Survivor Romania 1	Third place
37. Spies, Lies & Allies	Nany González	The Real World: Las Vegas (2011)	Fourth place
37. Spies, Lies & Allies	Nelson Thomas	Are You the One? 3	Fourth place
37. Spies, Lies & Allies	Amanda Garcia	Are You the One? 3	Eliminated
37. Spies, Lies & Allies	Emanuel Neagu	Survivor Romania 1	Eliminated
37. Spies, Lies & Allies	Logan Sampedro	Survivor Spain 13	Eliminated
37. Spies, Lies & Allies	Tula "Big T" Fazakerley	Shipwrecked: Battle of the Islands	Eliminated
37. Spies, Lies & Allies	Josh Martinez	Big Brother 19	Eliminated
37. Spies, Lies & Allies	Ashley Mitchell	Real World: Ex-Plosion	Disqualified
37. Spies, Lies & Allies	Cory Wharton	Real World: Ex-Plosion	Eliminated
37. Spies, Lies & Allies	Bettina Buchanan	Paradise Hotel Sweden 8	Eliminated
37. Spies, Lies & Allies	Ed Eason	The Circle US 1	Eliminated
37. Spies, Lies & Allies	Priscilla Anyabu	Love Island UK 6	Eliminated
37. Spies, Lies & Allies	Amber Borzotra	Big Brother 16	Eliminated
37. Spies, Lies & Allies	Jeremiah White	Love Island USA 2	Eliminated
37. Spies, Lies & Allies	Berna Canbeldek	Survivor Turkey 8	Eliminated
37. Spies, Lies & Allies	Hughie Maughan	Big Brother UK 17	Eliminated
37. Spies, Lies & Allies	Esther Agunbiade	Big Brother Nigeria 4	Eliminated
37. Spies, Lies & Allies	Faysal "Fessy" Shafaat	Big Brother 20	Disqualified
37. Spies, Lies & Allies	Gábor "Gabo" Szabó	Warsaw Shore 12	Eliminated
37. Spies, Lies & Allies	Aneesa Ferreira	The Real World: Chicago	Injured
37. Spies, Lies & Allies	Corey Lay	12 Dates of Christmas	Eliminated
37. Spies, Lies & Allies	Michele Fitzgerald	Survivor: Kaôh Rōng	Eliminated
37. Spies, Lies & Allies	Natacha "Tacha" Akide	Big Brother Nigeria 4	Eliminated
37. Spies, Lies & Allies	Tommy Sheehan	Survivor: Island of the Idols	Injured
37. Spies, Lies & Allies	Kelechi "Kelz" Dyke	Too Hot to Handle 1	Eliminated
37. Spies, Lies & Allies	Tracy Candela	Love Island Germany 2	Eliminated
37. Spies, Lies & Allies	Lauren Coogan	Love Island USA 2	Removed
37. Spies, Lies & Allies	Michaela Bradshaw	Survivor: Millennials vs. Gen X	Eliminated
37. Spies, Lies & Allies	Renan Hellemans	Ex on the Beach: Double Dutch 4	Eliminated
37. Spies, Lies & Allies	Nam Vo	Ultimate Beastmaster 1	Removed
38. Ride or Dies	Devin Walker-Molaghan	Are You the One? 3	Winner
38. Ride or Dies	Tori Deal	Are You the One? 4	Winner
38. Ride or Dies	Johnny "Bananas" Devenanzio	The Real World: Key West	Runner-up
38. Ride or Dies	Nany González	The Real World: Las Vegas (2011)	Runner-up
38. Ride or Dies	Aneesa Ferreira	The Real World: Chicago	Third place
38. Ride or Dies	Jordan Wiseley	The Real World: Portland	Third place
38. Ride or Dies	Horacio Gutiérrez	Exatlón Estados Unidos 5	Fourth place (DNF)
38. Ride or Dies	Olivia Kaiser	Love Island USA 3	Fourth place (DNF)
38. Ride or Dies	Faysal "Fessy" Shafaat	Big Brother 20	Eliminated
38. Ride or Dies	Moriah Jadea	Ride or Dies	Eliminated
38. Ride or Dies	Amber Borzotra	Big Brother 16	Eliminated
38. Ride or Dies	Chauncey Palmer	Ride or Dies	Eliminated
38. Ride or Dies	Kaycee Clark	Big Brother 20	Eliminated
38. Ride or Dies	Kenny Clark	Ride or Dies	Eliminated
38. Ride or Dies	Nelson Thomas	Are You the One? 3	Eliminated
38. Ride or Dies	Nurys Mateo	Are You the One? 6	Eliminated
38. Ride or Dies	Justin "Jay" Starrett	Survivor: Millennials vs. Gen X	Eliminated
38. Ride or Dies	Michele Fitzgerald	Survivor: Kaôh Rōng	Eliminated
38. Ride or Dies	Darrell Taylor	Road Rules: Campus Crawl	Eliminated
38. Ride or Dies	Veronica Portillo	Road Rules: Semester at Sea	Eliminated
38. Ride or Dies	Jakk Maddox	Ex on the Beach: Peak of Love	Eliminated
38. Ride or Dies	Laurel Stucky	Fresh Meat II	Eliminated
38. Ride or Dies	Colleen Schneider	The Mole Germany	Eliminated
38. Ride or Dies	Kim Tränka	Prince Charming 3	Eliminated
38. Ride or Dies	Analyse Talavera	Big Brother 21	Eliminated
38. Ride or Dies	Tommy Bracco	Big Brother 21	Eliminated
38. Ride or Dies	Johnny Middlebrooks	Love Island USA 2	Eliminated
38. Ride or Dies	Ravyn Rochelle	Ride or Dies	Eliminated
38. Ride or Dies	Tamara Alfaro	Ride or Dies	Eliminated
38. Ride or Dies	Turabi "Turbo" Çamkıran	Survivor Turkey 8	Eliminated
38. Ride or Dies	Nam Vo	Ultimate Beastmaster 1	Disqualified
38. Ride or Dies	Emmy Russ	Beauty & The Nerd 2	Quit
38. Ride or Dies	Kailah Casillas	Real World: Go Big or Go Home	Eliminated
38. Ride or Dies	Sam Bird	Love Island UK 4	Eliminated
39. Battle for a New Champion	Emanuel Neagu	Survivor Romania 1	Winner
39. Battle for a New Champion	Nurys Mateo	Are You the One? 6	Runner-up
39. Battle for a New Champion	Colleen Schneider	The Mole Germany	Third place
39. Battle for a New Champion	Corey Lay	12 Dates of Christmas	Fourth place
39. Battle for a New Champion	Berna Canbeldek	Survivor Turkey 8	Fifth place
39. Battle for a New Champion	Moriah Jadea	Ride or Dies	Sixth place
39. Battle for a New Champion	Justin "Jay" Starrett	Survivor: Millennials vs. Gen X	Seventh place
39. Battle for a New Champion	James Lock	The Only Way Is Essex 24	Eliminated
39. Battle for a New Champion	Olivia Kaiser	Love Island USA 3	Eliminated
39. Battle for a New Champion	Michele Fitzgerald	Survivor: Kaôh Rōng	Eliminated
39. Battle for a New Champion	Horacio Gutiérrez	Exatlón Estados Unidos 5	Eliminated
39. Battle for a New Champion	Kyland Young	Big Brother 23	Eliminated
39. Battle for a New Champion	Ed Eason	The Circle US 1	Eliminated
39. Battle for a New Champion	Zara Zoffany	The Royal World	Eliminated
39. Battle for a New Champion	Ravyn Rochelle	Ride or Dies	Eliminated
39. Battle for a New Champion	Asaf Goren	So You Think You Can Dance 12	Eliminated
39. Battle for a New Champion	Melissa Reeves	Ex on the Beach UK 2	Eliminated
39. Battle for a New Champion	Tula "Big T" Fazakerley	Shipwrecked: Battle of the Islands	Eliminated
39. Battle for a New Champion	Callum Izzard	Ibiza Weekender 7	Eliminated
39. Battle for a New Champion	Ciarran Stott	The Bachelorette Australia 5	Eliminated
39. Battle for a New Champion	Hughie Maughan	Big Brother UK 17	Eliminated
39. Battle for a New Champion	Sofia "Jujuy" Jiménez	Dancing with the Stars Argentina 2018	Eliminated
39. Battle for a New Champion	Chauncey Palmer	Ride or Dies	Eliminated
39. Battle for a New Champion	Jessica Brody	The Bachelor Australia 7	Eliminated
40. Battle of the Eras	Jenny West	Survival of the Fittest	Winner (2)
40. Battle of the Eras	Jordan Wiseley	The Real World: Portland	Winner (5)
40. Battle of the Eras	Rachel Robinson	Road Rules: Campus Crawl	Winner (3)
40. Battle of the Eras	Derek Chavez	The Real World: Cancun	Runner-up
40. Battle of the Eras	Johnny "Bananas" Devenanzio	The Real World: Key West	Third place
40. Battle of the Eras	Michele Fitzgerald	Survivor: Kaôh Rōng	Third place
40. Battle of the Eras	Kyland Young	Big Brother 23	Fourth place
40. Battle of the Eras	Tori Deal	Are You the One? 4	Fourth place
40. Battle of the Eras	Cara Maria Sorbello	Fresh Meat II	Eliminated
40. Battle of the Eras	Cory Wharton	Real World: Ex-Plosion	Eliminated
40. Battle of the Eras	Aviv Melmed	Fresh Meat	Eliminated
40. Battle of the Eras	Josh Martinez	Big Brother 19	Eliminated
40. Battle of the Eras	Olivia Kaiser	Love Island USA 3	Eliminated
40. Battle of the Eras	Theo Campbell	Love Island UK 3	Eliminated
40. Battle of the Eras	Nehemiah Clark	The Real World: Austin	Eliminated
40. Battle of the Eras	Laurel Stucky	Fresh Meat II	Eliminated
40. Battle of the Eras	Nia Moore	The Real World: Portland	Eliminated
40. Battle of the Eras	Ryan Kehoe	Fresh Meat	Eliminated
40. Battle of the Eras	Devin Walker-Molaghan	Are You the One? 3	Eliminated
40. Battle of the Eras	Kaycee Clark	Big Brother 20	Eliminated
40. Battle of the Eras	Derrick Kosinski	Road Rules: X-Treme	Eliminated
40. Battle of the Eras	Averey Tressler	The Real World: Portland	Eliminated
40. Battle of the Eras	Darrell Taylor	Road Rules: Campus Crawl	Eliminated
40. Battle of the Eras	Tina Barta	Road Rules: South Pacific	Eliminated
40. Battle of the Eras	Jonna Mannion	The Real World: Cancun	Eliminated
40. Battle of the Eras	Brad Fiorenza	The Real World: San Diego (2004)	Eliminated
40. Battle of the Eras	Chris "CT" Tamburello	The Real World: Paris	Eliminated
40. Battle of the Eras	Emily Schromm	The Real World: D.C.	Eliminated
40. Battle of the Eras	Horacio Gutiérrez	Exatlón Estados Unidos 5	Eliminated
40. Battle of the Eras	Aneesa Ferreira	The Real World: Chicago	Eliminated
40. Battle of the Eras	Jodi Weatherton	Road Rules: X-Treme	Eliminated
40. Battle of the Eras	Tony Raines	Real World: Skeletons	Eliminated
40. Battle of the Eras	Brandon Nelson	Fresh Meat II	Eliminated
40. Battle of the Eras	KellyAnne Judd	The Real World: Sydney	Eliminated
40. Battle of the Eras	Nurys Mateo	Are You the One? 6	Eliminated
40. Battle of the Eras	Paulie Calafiore	Big Brother 18	Eliminated
40. Battle of the Eras	Katie Cooley	Road Rules: The Quest	Eliminated
40. Battle of the Eras	Mark Long	Road Rules: USA - The First Adventure	Eliminated
40. Battle of the Eras	Leroy Garrett	The Real World: Las Vegas (2011)	Eliminated
40. Battle of the Eras	Amanda Garcia	Are You the One? 3	Eliminated

== Seasons 41–present ==
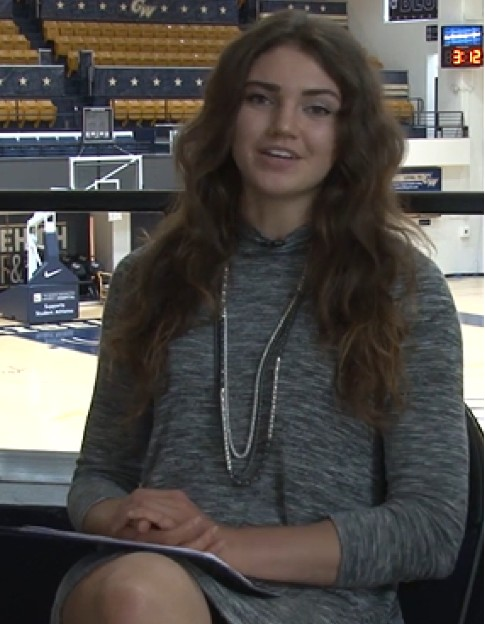
Alexis Lete, Cutthroat

Season	Contestant	Original series	Finish
41. Vets & New Threats	Olivia Kaiser	Love Island USA 3	Winner
41. Vets & New Threats	Yeremi Hykel	The Amazing Race 35	Winner
41. Vets & New Threats	Sydney Segal	Survivor 41	Runner-up
41. Vets & New Threats	Turabi "Turbo" Çamkıran	Survivor Turkey 8	Runner-up
41. Vets & New Threats	Cedric Hodges	Big Brother 26	Third place
41. Vets & New Threats	Michaela Bradshaw	Survivor: Millennials vs. Gen X	Third place
41. Vets & New Threats	Adrienne Naylor	Married at First Sight UK 8	Fourth place (DNF)
41. Vets & New Threats	Theo Campbell	Love Island UK 3	Fourth place (DNF)
41. Vets & New Threats	Justin Hinsley	Cheer 1	Eliminated
41. Vets & New Threats	Nany González	The Real World: Las Vegas (2011)	Eliminated
41. Vets & New Threats	Aviv Melmed	Real World/Road Rules Challenge: Fresh Meat	Eliminated
41. Vets & New Threats	Will Gagnon	Are You the One? 9	Eliminated
41. Vets & New Threats	Aneesa Ferreira	The Real World: Chicago	Eliminated
41. Vets & New Threats	Jake Cornish	Love Island UK 7	Eliminated
41. Vets & New Threats	Ashley Mitchell	Real World: Ex-Plosion	Eliminated
41. Vets & New Threats	Leonardo "Leo" Dionicio	Love Island USA 5	Eliminated
41. Vets & New Threats	America Lopez	Big Brother 25	Eliminated
41. Vets & New Threats	Leroy Garrett	The Real World: Las Vegas (2011)	Eliminated
41. Vets & New Threats	Dee Valladares	Survivor 45	Eliminated
41. Vets & New Threats	Derrick Kosinski	Road Rules: X-Treme	Eliminated
41. Vets & New Threats	Gabe Wai	WWE	Eliminated
41. Vets & New Threats	Jonna Mannion	The Real World: Cancun	Eliminated
41. Vets & New Threats	Chris "CT" Tamburello	The Real World: Paris	Eliminated
41. Vets & New Threats	Tay Wilcoxson	Big Brother Australia 15	Eliminated
41. Vets & New Threats	Derek Chavez	The Real World: Cancun	Eliminated
41. Vets & New Threats	Izzy Fairthorne	Too Hot to Handle 3	Eliminated
41. Vets & New Threats	Ayoleka "Leka" Sodade	Canada's Ultimate Challenge 2	Eliminated
41. Vets & New Threats	Ben Davis	Boxer	Eliminated
41. Vets & New Threats	Cara Maria Sorbello	The Challenge: Fresh Meat II	Quit
41. Vets & New Threats	Johnny "Bananas" Devenanzio	The Real World: Key West	Eliminated
41. Vets & New Threats	Nia Moore	The Real World: Portland	Injured
41. Vets & New Threats	Blue Kim	Big Brother 25	Eliminated
41. Vets & New Threats	Rogan O'Connor	Ex on the Beach UK 2	Eliminated
42. Cutthroat	Chris "CT" Tamburello	The Real World: Paris	Winner (6)
42. Cutthroat	Johnny "Bananas" Devenanzio	The Real World: Key West	Winner (8)
42. Cutthroat	Tori Deal	Are You the One? 4	Winner (2)
42. Cutthroat	Will Gagnon	Are You the One? 9	Winner
42. Cutthroat	Michele Fitzgerald	Survivor: Kaôh Rōng	Winner
42. Cutthroat	Adrienne Naylor	Married at First Sight UK 8	Runner-up
42. Cutthroat	Alexis Lete	WWE NXT	Runner-up
42. Cutthroat	Cara Maria Sorbello	The Challenge: Fresh Meat II	Runner-up
42. Cutthroat	Cassidy Clark	Survivor 43	Runner-up
42. Cutthroat	Justin Hinsley	Cheer	Eliminated
42. Cutthroat	Anna Leigh Wilson	The Amazing Race 35	Eliminated
42. Cutthroat	Chris Underwood	Survivor: Edge of Extinction	Eliminated
42. Cutthroat	Izzy Fairthorne	Too Hot to Handle 3	Eliminated
42. Cutthroat	Josh Goldstein	Love Island USA 3	Disqualified
42. Cutthroat	Leonardo "Leo" Dionicio	Love Island USA 5	Disqualified
42. Cutthroat	Nelson Thomas	Are You the One? 3	Disqualified
42. Cutthroat	Cory Wharton	Real World: Ex-Plosion	Quit
42. Cutthroat	Keanu Soto	Big Brother 27	Eliminated
42. Cutthroat	Deb Chubb	Love Island USA 4	Eliminated
42. Cutthroat	Sydney Segal	Survivor 41	Injured
42. Cutthroat	Nurys Mateo	Are You the One? 6	Eliminated
42. Cutthroat	Brad Fiorenza	The Real World: San Diego (2004)	Eliminated
42. Cutthroat	Reilly Smedley	Big Brother 25	Eliminated
42. Cutthroat	Cedric Hodges	Big Brother 26	Eliminated

== Spin-offs ==
=== The Challenge: Champs vs. Stars ===
Season	Contestant	Original series/known for	Finish
Champs vs. Pros	Cara Maria Sorbello	The Challenge: Fresh Meat II	Winner
Champs vs. Pros	Darrell Taylor	Road Rules: Campus Crawl	Winner
Champs vs. Pros	Kamerion Wimbley	Retired NFL linebacker	Runner-up
Champs vs. Pros	Lindsey Jacobellis	Snowboarder and Olympic Medalist	Runner-up
Champs vs. Pros	Camila Nakagawa	Spring Break Challenge	Third place
Champs vs. Pros	Wes Bergmann	The Real World: Austin	Third place
Champs vs. Pros	Chris "CT" Tamburello	The Real World: Paris	Eliminated
Champs vs. Pros	Gus Kenworthy	Skier and Olympic medalist	Eliminated
Champs vs. Pros	Louise Hazel	Heptathlete and Olympian	Eliminated
Champs vs. Pros	Lolo Jones	Olympic hurdler and bobsledder	Eliminated
Champs vs. Pros	Ashley Mitchell	Real World: Ex-Plosion	Eliminated
Champs vs. Pros	Louie Vito	Snowboarder and Olympian	Eliminated
Champs vs. Pros	Jordan Wiseley	The Real World: Portland	Eliminated
Champs vs. Pros	CM Punk	UFC Fighter/Former Pro Wrestler	Eliminated
Champs vs. Pros	Tia Blanco	Surfer and World Champion	Eliminated
Champs vs. Pros	Ashley Kelsey	The Real World: San Diego (2011)	Eliminated
Champs vs. Pros	Johnny "Bananas" Devenanzio	The Real World: Key West	Eliminated
Champs vs. Pros	Shawne Merriman	Retired NFL linebacker	Eliminated
Champs vs. Pros	Candice Wiggins	Retired WNBA Player	Eliminated
Champs vs. Pros	Veronica Portillo	Road Rules: Semester at Sea	Eliminated
Champs vs. Stars 1	Johnny "Bananas" Devenanzio	The Real World: Key West	Winner
Champs vs. Stars 1	Emily Schromm	The Real World: D.C.	Winner
Champs vs. Stars 1	Chris "CT" Tamburello	The Real World: Paris	Winner
Champs vs. Stars 1	Josh Murray	The Bachelorette US 10	Runner-up
Champs vs. Stars 1	Justina Valentine	Rapper / Wild 'n Out	Runner-up
Champs vs. Stars 1	Michelle Waterson	UFC	Runner-up
Champs vs. Stars 1	Tori Deal	Are You the One? 4	Eliminated
Champs vs. Stars 1	Wes Bergmann	The Real World: Austin	Eliminated
Champs vs. Stars 1	Zach Nichols	The Real World: San Diego (2011)	Eliminated
Champs vs. Stars 1	Ariane Andrew	Former WWE pro wrestler	Eliminated
Champs vs. Stars 1	Kim Glass	Olympic Volleyballer	Eliminated
Champs vs. Stars 1	Matt Rife	Wild 'n Out / TRL	Eliminated
Champs vs. Stars 1	Aneesa Ferreira	The Real World: Chicago	Eliminated
Champs vs. Stars 1	Riff Raff	Hip Hop Artist / From G's to Gents	Eliminated
Champs vs. Stars 1	Shawn Johnson	Olympic Gymnast	Eliminated
Champs vs. Stars 1	Romeo Miller	Rapper / Actor	Eliminated
Champs vs. Stars 1	Ashley Mitchell	Real World: Ex-Plosion	Quit
Champs vs. Stars 1	Terrell Owens	NFL wide receiver	Quit
Champs vs. Stars 1	Jenna Compono	Real World: Ex-Plosion	Injured
Champs vs. Stars 1	Cory Wharton	Real World: Ex-Plosion	Eliminated
Champs vs. Stars 1	Camilla Nakagawa	Spring Break Challenge	Disqualified
Champs vs. Stars 2	Chris "CT" Tamburello	The Real World: Paris	Winner (2)
Champs vs. Stars 2	Tony Raines	Real World: Skeletons	Winner
Champs vs. Stars 2	Casper Smart	Dancer	Runner-up
Champs vs. Stars 2	Louise Hazel	Olympian	Runner-up
Champs vs. Stars 2	Daniel Gibson	Former NBA guard	Third place
Champs vs. Stars 2	Wes Bergmann	The Real World: Austin	Third place
Champs vs. Stars 2	Drake Bell	Actor and singer	Eliminated
Champs vs. Stars 2	Kailah Casillas	Real World: Go Big or Go Home	Eliminated
Champs vs. Stars 2	Lil Mama	Rapper	Eliminated
Champs vs. Stars 2	Tori Deal	Are You the One? 4	Eliminated
Champs vs. Stars 2	Brooke Hogan	TV personality	Eliminated
Champs vs. Stars 2	Shane Landrum	Road Rules: Campus Crawl	Eliminated
Champs vs. Stars 2	Jozea Flores	Big Brother 18	Eliminated
Champs vs. Stars 2	Selita Ebanks	Model	Eliminated
Champs vs. Stars 2	Ashley Mitchell	Real World: Ex-Plosion	Eliminated
Champs vs. Stars 2	Devin Walker	Are You the One? 3	Eliminated
Champs vs. Stars 2	Aneesa Ferreira	The Real World: Chicago	Injured
Champs vs. Stars 2	Hennessy Carolina	Social media personality	Quit
Champs vs. Stars 2	Kam Williams	Are You the One? 5	Eliminated
Champs vs. Stars 2	Arian Foster	NFL running back	Eliminated

=== The Challenge: All Stars ===
Season	Contestant	Original series	Finish
1	Yes Duffy	Road Rules: Semester at Sea	Winner (2)
1	Darrell Taylor	Road Rules: Campus Crawl	Runner-up
1	Jonna Mannion	The Real World: Cancun	Third place
1	KellyAnne Judd	The Real World: Sydney	Third place
1	Mark Long	Road Rules: USA - The First Adventure	Fifth place
1	Alton Williams	The Real World: Las Vegas (2002)	Sixth place
1	Jemmye Carroll	The Real World: New Orleans (2010)	Seventh place
1	Ruthie Alcaide	The Real World: Hawaii	Seventh place
1	Aneesa Ferreira	The Real World: Chicago	Ninth place
1	Eric "Big Easy" Banks	Real World/Road Rules Challenge: Fresh Meat	Tenth place
1	Derrick Kosinski	Road Rules: X-Treme	Eleventh place
1	Jisela Delgado	Road Rules: The Quest	Eleventh place
1	Kendal Darnell	Road Rules: Campus Crawl	Eliminated
1	Nehemiah Clark	The Real World: Austin	Eliminated
1	Katie Cooley	Road Rules: The Quest	Eliminated
1	Laterrian Wallace	Road Rules: Maximum Velocity Tour	Eliminated
1	Beth Stolarczyk	The Real World: Los Angeles	Eliminated
1	Syrus Yarbrough	The Real World: Boston	Eliminated
1	Arissa Hill	The Real World: Las Vegas (2002)	Quit
1	Tecumshea "Teck" Holmes	The Real World: Hawaii	Eliminated
1	Trishelle Cannatella	The Real World: Las Vegas (2002)	Eliminated
1	Ace Amerson	The Real World: Paris	Eliminated
2	Jonna Mannion	The Real World: Cancun	Winner
2	MJ Garrett	The Real World: Philadelphia	Winner (2)
2	Darrell Taylor	Road Rules: Campus Crawl	Runner-up
2	Janelle Casanave	The Real World: Key West	Runner-up
2	Melinda Collins	The Real World: Austin	Runner-up
2	Nehemiah Clark	The Real World: Austin	Runner-up
2	Ayanna Mackins	Road Rules: Semester at Sea	Fourth place (DNF)
2	Tecumshea "Teck" Holmes	The Real World: Hawaii	Fourth place (DNF)
2	Brad Fiorenza	The Real World: San Diego (2004)	Eliminated
2	Jodi Weatherton	Road Rules: X-Treme	Eliminated
2	Jasmine Reynaud	The Real World: Cancun	Eliminated
2	Laterrian Wallace	Road Rules: Maximum Velocity Tour	Eliminated
2	Cohutta Grindstaff	The Real World: Sydney	Disqualified
2	Casey Cooper	Real World/Road Rules Challenge: Fresh Meat	Injured
2	Tyler Duckworth	The Real World: Key West	Eliminated
2	Kendal Darnell	Road Rules: Campus Crawl	Injured
2	Tina Barta	Road Rules: South Pacific	Eliminated
2	Steve Meinke	Road Rules: The Quest	Eliminated
2	Derrick Kosinski	Road Rules: X-Treme	Eliminated
2	Katie Cooley	Road Rules: The Quest	Eliminated
2	Sophia Pasquis	Road Rules: The Quest	Eliminated
2	Ryan Kehoe	Real World/Road Rules Challenge: Fresh Meat	Eliminated
2	Leah Gillingwater	The Real World: Paris	Eliminated
2	Derek Chavez	The Real World: Cancun	Eliminated
3	Jonna Mannion	The Real World: Cancun	Winner (2)
3	Wes Bergmann	The Real World: Austin	Winner (3)
3	Brad Fiorenza	The Real World: San Diego (2004)	Runner-up
3	Kailah Casillas	Real World: Go Big or Go Home	Runner-up
3	Nehemiah Clark	The Real World: Austin	Third place
3	Nia Moore	The Real World: Portland	Third place
3	KellyAnne Judd	The Real World: Sydney	Fourth place
3	Mark Long	Road Rules: USA - The First Adventure	Fourth place
3	Derrick Kosinski	Road Rules: X-Treme	Eliminated
3	Veronica Portillo	Road Rules: Semester at Sea	Injured
3	Jordan Wiseley	The Real World: Portland	Eliminated
3	Roni Martin	Road Rules: Northern Trail	Eliminated
3	MJ Garrett	The Real World: Philadelphia	Eliminated
3	Sylvia Elsrode	Real World: Skeletons	Eliminated
3	Yes Duffy	Road Rules: Semester at Sea	Eliminated
3	Beth Stolarczyk	The Real World: Los Angeles	Quit
3	Darrell Taylor	Road Rules: Campus Crawl	Eliminated
3	Kendal Darnell	Road Rules: Campus Crawl	Eliminated
3	Syrus Yarbrough	The Real World: Boston	Eliminated
3	Jemmye Carroll	The Real World: New Orleans (2010)	Quit
3	Tina Barta	Road Rules: South Pacific	Injured
3	Laterrian Wallace	Road Rules: Maximum Velocity Tour	Eliminated
3	Melinda Collins	The Real World: Austin	Quit
3	Tyler Duckworth	The Real World: Key West	Eliminated
3	Cynthia Roberts	The Real World: Miami	Eliminated
4	Laurel Stucky	The Challenge: Fresh Meat II	Winner (2)
4	Cara Maria Sorbello	The Challenge: Fresh Meat II	Runner-up
4	Steve Meinke	Road Rules: The Quest	Third place
4	Ace Amerson	The Real World: Paris	Fourth place
4	Nicole Zanatta	Real World: Skeletons	Fifth place
4	Veronica Portillo	Road Rules: Semester at Sea	Fifth place
4	Leroy Garrett	The Real World: Las Vegas (2011)	Seventh place
4	Derek Chavez	The Real World: Cancun	Eighth place
4	Adam Larson	Road Rules: The Quest	Eliminated
4	Averey Tressler	The Real World: Portland	Eliminated
4	Ryan Kehoe	Real World/Road Rules Challenge: Fresh Meat	Eliminated
4	Flora Alekseyeun	The Real World: Miami	Quit
4	Jay Mitchell	Real World: Ex-Plosion	Eliminated
4	Kam Williams	Are You the One? 5	Eliminated
4	Tina Barta	Road Rules: South Pacific	Eliminated
4	Brad Fiorenza	The Real World: San Diego (2004)	Eliminated
4	Jasmine Reynaud	The Real World: Cancun	Eliminated
4	Kefla Hare	Road Rules: Down Under	Eliminated
4	Brandon Nelson	The Challenge: Fresh Meat II	Eliminated
4	Rachel Robinson	Road Rules: Campus Crawl	Eliminated
4	Ayanna Mackins	Road Rules: Semester at Sea	Eliminated
4	Syrus Yarbrough	The Real World: Boston	Eliminated
4	Tony Raines	Real World: Skeletons	Quit
4	Janelle Casanave	The Real World: Key West	Quit
4	Tyri Ballard	The Real World: Denver	Eliminated
5	Adam Larson	Road Rules: The Quest	Winner (2)
5	Steve Meinke	Road Rules: The Quest	Winner
5	Da'Vonne Rogers	Big Brother 17	Runner-up
5	Shane Landrum	Road Rules: Campus Crawl	Runner-up
5	Frank Fox	The Real World: San Diego (2011)	Third place
5	Sam McGinn	The Real World: San Diego (2011)	Third place
5	Melissa Reeves	Ex on the Beach UK 2	Fourth place
5	Nicole Zanatta	Real World: Skeletons	Fourth place
5	Nany González	The Real World: Las Vegas (2011)	Eliminated
5	Turabi "Turbo" Çamkıran	Survivor Turkey 8	Eliminated
5	Katie Cooley	Road Rules: The Quest	Eliminated
5	Veronica Portillo	Road Rules: Semester at Sea	Eliminated
5	Ashley Kelsey	The Real World: San Diego (2011)	Eliminated
5	Dario Medrano	Are You the One? 2	Eliminated
5	Amber Borzotra	Big Brother 16	Eliminated
5	Faysal "Fessy" Shafaat	Big Brother 20	Eliminated
5	Corey Lay	12 Dates of Christmas	Eliminated
5	Tula "Big T" Fazakerley	Shipwrecked: Battle of the Islands	Eliminated
5	Devin Walker-Molaghan	Are You the One? 3	Eliminated
5	Leroy Garrett	The Real World: Las Vegas (2011)	Eliminated
5	Aneesa Ferreira	The Real World: Chicago	Eliminated
5	Ashley Mitchell	Real World: Ex-Plosion	Eliminated
5	KellyAnne Judd	The Real World: Sydney	Eliminated
5	Sylvia Elsrode	Real World: Skeletons	Eliminated
5	Beth Stolarczyk	The Real World: Los Angeles	Eliminated
5	Jonna Mannion	The Real World: Cancun	Eliminated

=== World Championship & International series ===
List of international the Challenge spin-offs
Name	Known for	Season	Finish
Danny McCray	Survivor 41	1. USA	Winner
Sarah Lacina	Survivor: Cagayan	1. USA	Winner
Cayla Platt	The Amazing Race 33	1. USA	Runner-up (DNF)
Domenick Abbate	Survivor: Ghost Island	1. USA	Runner-up (DNF)
Justine Ndiba	Love Island 2	1. USA	Runner-up (DNF)
Tyson Apostol	Survivor: Tocantins	1. USA	Runner-up (DNF)
Angela Rummans	Big Brother 20	1. USA	Fourth place (DNF)
Enzo Palumbo	Big Brother 12	1. USA	Fourth place (DNF)
Desi Williams	Survivor: Heroes vs. Healers vs. Hustlers	1. USA	Fifth place (DNF)
Ben Driebergen	Survivor: Heroes vs. Healers vs. Hustlers	1. USA	Fifth place (DNF)
Alyssa Lopez	Big Brother 23	1. USA	Eliminated
David Alexander	Big Brother 21	1. USA	Eliminated
Cashay Proudfoot	Love Island 3	1. USA	Eliminated
Leo Temory	The Amazing Race 23	1. USA	Eliminated
Kyland Young	Big Brother 23	1. USA	Eliminated
Kyra Green	Love Island 1	1. USA	Eliminated
Derek Xiao	Big Brother 23	1. USA	Eliminated
Shannon St. Clair	Love Island 3	1. USA	Eliminated
Azah Awasum	Big Brother 23	1. USA	Eliminated
Melvin "Cinco" Holland Jr.	Love Island 3	1. USA	Eliminated
Shan Smith	Survivor 41	1. USA	Eliminated
Xavier Prather	Big Brother 23	1. USA	Eliminated
James Wallington	The Amazing Race 32	1. USA	Eliminated
Tasha Fox	Survivor: Cagayan	1. USA	Eliminated
Cashel Barnett	Love Island 1	1. USA	Eliminated
Tiffany Mitchell	Big Brother 23	1. USA	Eliminated
Cely Vazquez	Love Island 2	1. USA	Eliminated
Javonny Vega	Love Island 3	1. USA	Eliminated
Troy Cullen	Australian Ninja Warrior 4	2. Australia	Winner
Kiki Morris	The Bachelor Australia 4	2. Australia	Winner
Brooke Jowett	Australian Survivor 3	2. Australia	Runner-up
Ciarran Stott	The Bachelorette Australia 5	2. Australia	Runner-up
Brittany Hockley	The Bachelor Australia 6	2. Australia	Third place
Conor Curran	Masterchef Australia 13	2. Australia	Third place
Brooke Blurton	The Bachelor Australia 6	2. Australia	Eliminated
Konrad Bien-Stephen	The Bachelorette Australia 7	2. Australia	Eliminated
Grant Crapp	Love Island Australia 1	2. Australia	Eliminated
Megan Marx	The Bachelor Australia 4	2. Australia	Eliminated
Emily Seebohm	Olympian	2. Australia	Eliminated
Marley Biyendolo	Big Brother Australia 13	2. Australia	Eliminated
Ryan Gallagher	Married at First Sight Australia 5	2. Australia	Eliminated
Cherneka "Sugar" Johnson	Professional boxer	2. Australia	Eliminated
Cyrell Paule	Married at First Sight Australia 6	2. Australia	Eliminated
Johnny Eastoe	Australian Survivor: Champions vs. Contenders 2	2. Australia	Eliminated
David Subritzky	I'm a Celebrity...Get Me Out of Here! Australia 8	2. Australia	Eliminated
Jessica Brody	The Bachelor Australia 7	2. Australia	Eliminated
Audrey Kanongara	Love Island Australia 3	2. Australia	Eliminated
Jack Vidgen	Australia's Got Talent 5	2. Australia	Eliminated
Billy Dib	Professional boxer	2. Australia	Eliminated
Suzan Mutesi	Actress & Influencer	2. Australia	Eliminated
Sol Pérez	Model and presenter	3. Argentina: El Desafio	Winner
Oky Appo	YouTuber	3. Argentina: El Desafio	Runner-up
Stéfano "Yeyo" de Gregorio	Actor	3. Argentina: El Desafio	Third place
Rodrigo "Rodri" Cascón	Celebrity chef	3. Argentina: El Desafio	Fourth place
Eva Bargiela	Model	3. Argentina: El Desafio	Fifth place
Claudia Albertario	Model and actress	3. Argentina: El Desafio	Sixth place
Lionel "Lio" Ferro	Influencer	3. Argentina: El Desafio	Seventh place
Julieta "Juli" de la Puente	Influencer	3. Argentina: El Desafio	Eighth place
Adrián "Adro" Cormillot	Celebrity physician	3. Argentina: El Desafio	Eliminated
María Fernanda Callejón	Actress	3. Argentina: El Desafio	Eliminated
Virginia "Virgie" Elizalde	Former model	3. Argentina: El Desafio	Eliminated
Benjamín "Benja" Alfonso	Actor	3. Argentina: El Desafio	Eliminated
Sofia "Jujuy" Jiménez	Model	3. Argentina: El Desafio	Eliminated
Rodrigo "Morita" Mora	Former football player	3. Argentina: El Desafio	Eliminated
Florencia "Floppy" Tesouro	Model and vedette	3. Argentina: El Desafio	Eliminated
Lizardo Ponce	Influencer	3. Argentina: El Desafio	Eliminated
Fernando Burlando	Celebrity lawyer	3. Argentina: El Desafio	Eliminated
Carolina Duer	Professional boxer	3. Argentina: El Desafio	Eliminated
Kaz Crossley	Love Island 4	4. UK	Winner
Tristan Phipps	Made in Chelsea 16	4. UK	Winner
Nathan Henry	Geordie Shore 10	4. UK	Runner-up
Zara Zoffany	The Royal World	4. UK	Runner-up
Callum Izzard	Ibiza Weekender 7	4. UK	Third place
Courtney Veale	Below Deck Mediterranean 6	4. UK	Third place
AJ Pritchard	Strictly Come Dancing 14	4. UK	Fourth place
Arabella Chi	Love Island 5	4. UK	Fourth place
Ashley McKenzie	Celebrity Big Brother 10	4. UK	Eliminated
Ella Wise	The Only Way Is Essex 24	4. UK	Eliminated
Danni Menzies	A Place in the Sun	4. UK	Eliminated
Marcel Somerville	Love Island 3	4. UK	Eliminated
Curtis Pritchard	Love Island 5	4. UK	Eliminated
Kaz Kamwi	Love Island 7	4. UK	Eliminated
Aisleyne Horgan-Wallace	Big Brother 7	4. UK	Eliminated
James Lock	The Only Way Is Essex 24	4. UK	Eliminated
Jordan Wiseley	The Real World: Portland	5. World Championship	Winner (4)
Kaz Crossley	Love Island 4	5. World Championship	Winner (2)
Danny McCray	Survivor 41	5. World Championship	Runner-up
Tori Deal	Are You the One? 4	5. World Championship	Runner-up
Kaycee Clark	Big Brother 20	5. World Championship	Third place
Troy Cullen	Australian Ninja Warrior 4	5. World Championship	Third place
Sarah Lacina	Survivor: Cagayan	5. World Championship	Fourth place (DNF)
Theo Campbell	Love Island UK 3	5. World Championship	Fourth place (DNF)
Emily Seebohm	Olympian	5. World Championship	Eliminated
Yes Duffy	Road Rules: Semester at Sea	5. World Championship	Eliminated
Darrell Taylor	Road Rules: Campus Crawl	5. World Championship	Eliminated
Kiki Morris	The Bachelor Australia 4	5. World Championship	Eliminated
KellyAnne Judd	The Real World: Sydney	5. World Championship	Eliminated
Tristan Phipps	Made in Chelsea 16	5. World Championship	Eliminated
Benjamín "Benja" Alfonso	Actor	5. World Championship	Eliminated
Jodi Weatherton	Road Rules: X-Treme	5. World Championship	Eliminated
Amber Borzotra	Big Brother 16	5. World Championship	Quit
Ben Driebergen	Survivor: Heroes vs. Healers vs. Hustlers	5. World Championship	Injured
Johnny "Bananas" Devenanzio	The Real World: Key West	5. World Championship	Eliminated
Justine Ndiba	Love Island 2	5. World Championship	Eliminated
Grant Crapp	Love Island Australia 1	5. World Championship	Injured
Jonna Mannion	The Real World: Cancun	5. World Championship	Disqualified
Wes Bergmann	The Real World: Austin	5. World Championship	Eliminated
Zara Zoffany	The Royal World	5. World Championship	Eliminated
Nia Moore	The Real World: Portland	5. World Championship	Eliminated
Rodrigo "Rodri" Cascón	Celebrity chef	5. World Championship	Eliminated
Sofia "Jujuy" Jiménez	Model	5. World Championship	Eliminated
Nelson Thomas	Are You the One? 3	5. World Championship	Eliminated
Claudia Albertario	Model and actress	5. World Championship	Eliminated
Nathan Henry	Geordie Shore 10	5. World Championship	Injured
Chris Underwood	Survivor: Edge of Extinction	6. USA 2	Winner
Desi Williams	Survivor: Heroes vs. Healers vs. Hustlers	6. USA 2	Winner
Chanelle Howell	Survivor 42	6. USA 2	Runner-up
Cory Wharton	Real World: Ex-Plosion	6. USA 2	Runner-up
Johnny "Bananas" Devenanzio	The Real World: Key West	6. USA 2	Third place
Michaela Bradshaw	Survivor: Millennials vs. Gen X	6. USA 2	Third place (DNF)
Faysal "Fessy" Shafaat	Big Brother 20	6. USA 2	Fourth place
Tori Deal	Are You the One? 4	6. USA 2	Fourth place
Josh Martinez	Big Brother 19	6. USA 2	Eliminated
Cassidy Clark	Survivor 43	6. USA 2	Eliminated
Michele Fitzgerald	Survivor: Kaôh Rōng	6. USA 2	Eliminated
Tyler Crispen	Big Brother 20	6. USA 2	Eliminated
Wes Bergmann	The Real World: Austin	6. USA 2	Eliminated
Alyssa Snider	Big Brother 24	6. USA 2	Eliminated
Sebastian Noel	Survivor: Ghost Island	6. USA 2	Eliminated
Monte Taylor	Big Brother 24	6. USA 2	Eliminated
Tiffany Mitchell	Big Brother 23	6. USA 2	Eliminated
Dusty Harris	The Amazing Race 33	6. USA 2	Eliminated
Alyssa Lopez	Big Brother 23	6. USA 2	Eliminated
Amanda Garcia	Are You the One? 3	6. USA 2	Eliminated
Luis Colón	The Amazing Race 34	6. USA 2	Eliminated
Paulie Calafiore	Big Brother 18	6. USA 2	Eliminated
Jonna Mannion	The Real World: Cancun	6. USA 2	Eliminated
Ameerah Jones	Big Brother 24	6. USA 2	Eliminated
Jens Thomas Rönnqvist	The Farm 2020	7. Sverige	Winner
Sandra Cucarano	Robinson 2022	7. Sverige	Winner
Jennifer Schill	The Farm 2021	7. Sverige	Runner-up
Viktor Bergström	The Farm 2023	7. Sverige	Runner-up
Anthony Yigit	SAS: Who Dares Wins Sweden 2021	7. Sverige	Eliminated
Elvira Svensson	The Bachelor Sweden 2021	7. Sverige	Eliminated
Robin Johansen	The Farm 2018	7. Sverige	Eliminated
Matilda Borgström	The Bachelor Sweden 2021	7. Sverige	Quit
Alexander Segerström	The Farm 2022	7. Sverige	Eliminated
Joanna Swica	Robinson 2021	7. Sverige	Eliminated
Helené Fransson	The Farm 2022	7. Sverige	Eliminated
Homayon Sytes	Robinson: Malaysia	7. Sverige	Eliminated
Cruise Ferreira	Robinson 2020	7. Sverige	Eliminated
Elin Härkönen	SAS: Who Dares Wins Sweden 2021	7. Sverige	Quit
Phillip-Lloyd Rochester	The Farm 2021	7. Sverige	Injured
Emmy Rönning	The Bachelor Sweden 2019	7. Sverige	Quit
Fabian Thingwall	Robinson 2020	7. Sverige	Eliminated
Izabella Anderson	The Farm 2022	7. Sverige	Eliminated
Joshua Akena	The Bachelorette Sweden 2022	7. Sverige	Quit
Isabella Resmark	Robinson 2022	7. Sverige	Eliminated
Carl Bengtsson	The Bachelorette Sweden 2021	7. Sverige	Eliminated
Olivia Baldwin	Robinson 2021	7. Sverige	Eliminated
Greta Pierre	Robinson: Malaysia	7. Sverige	Eliminated
Valentino Demina	Robinson: Malaysia	7. Sverige	Eliminated

== See also ==
- List of The Real World cast members
