= List of Ex on the Beach (American TV series) cast members =

The following is a list of cast members who have appeared in the American reality television series Ex on the Beach.

== Cast ==
- **Bold** indicates original cast member; all other cast were brought into the series as an ex.

Season	Cast member	Exes
1	**Alicia Wright**	Derrick Henry, Cory Wharton, Andre Siemers
1	**Angela Babicz**	Derrick Henry
1	**Chase McNary**	Skyler Mikkelson
1	**Chris Pearson**	Chelsko Thompson, Haley Read
1	**Cory Wharton**	Alicia Wright
1	**Faith Stowers**	Marcus Rosenzweig, June Robinson
1	**Jasmine Goode**	Marco Delvecchio
1	**Paulie Calafiore**	Lexi Marsella
1	**Taylor Selfridge**	Andre Siemers, Joe Torgerson, Cameron Kolbo
1	**Tor'i Brooks**	—
1	**Victoria Alario**	Luis Rivera
1	Derrick Henry	Angela Babicz, Alicia Wright
1	Lexi Marsella	Paulie Calafiore
1	Skyler Mikkelson	Chase McNary
1	Chelsko Thompson	Chris Pearson
1	Andre Siemers	Taylor Selfridge, Alicia Wright
1	Haley Read	Chris Pearson
1	Cameron Kolbo	Taylor Selfridge, Shanley McIntee
1	June Robinson	Faith Stowers
1	Luis Rivera	Victoria Alario
1	Shanley McIntee	Cameron Kolbo
1	Marcus Rosenzweig	Faith Stowers
1	Marco Delvecchio	Jasmine Goode
1	Charles Davis	—
1	Joe Torgerson	Taylor Selfridge
2	**Chad Johnson**	Madeline Sullivan
2	**Cheyenne Parker**	Murray Swanby
2	**Farrah Abraham**	Simon Saran
2	**Janelle Shanks**	Darian Vandermark (Nelson Thomas)
2	**Jozea Flores**	Rob Tini
2	**Malcolm Drummer**	Diandra Delgado, Nurys Mateo
2	**Maya Benberry**	Kareem Peterson, J.D. Harmon, Perez Carothers
2	**Morgan Willett**	Jay Starrett, Corey Brooks, Monte Massongill
2	**Nicole Ramos**	Nate Sestok
2	**Corey Brooks**	Morgan Willett, Sha Carrell
2	**Angela Babicz**	Tor'i Brooks
2	Diandra Delgado	Malcolm Drummer (Nelson Thomas)
2	Jay Starrett	Morgan Willett
2	Kareem Peterson	Maya Benberry
2	Murray Swanby	Cheyenne Parker, Cory Zwierzynski
2	Simon Saran	Farrah Abraham
2	Cory Zwierzynski	Murray Swanby
2	Sha Carrell	Corey Brooks
2	Nurys Mateo	Malcolm Drummer, Nelson Thomas
2	Nelson Thomas	Nurys Mateo (Janelle Shanks, Diandra Delgado)
2	Rob Tini	Jozea Flores
2	Darian Vandermark	Janelle Shanks
2	Monte Massongill	Morgan Willett
2	J.D. Harmon	Maya Benberry
2	Madeline Sullivan	Chad Johnson
2	Nate Sestok	Nicole Ramos
2	Perez Carothers	Maya Benberry
2	Tor'i Brooks	Angela Babicz
3	**Alexa "Lexi" Kaplan**	Max-Davis Kurtzman
3	**Allie Kaplan**	—
3	**Aubrey O'Day**	Lisa Coffey
3	**Billy Reilich**	Cara Cooper, Emily Arreseigor, Tyler Garrigus
3	**Cameron Armstrong**	Alexis McNeal, Ariana Nova
3	**Demetrius "Mechie" Harris**	Kellie Sweet, Danielle Clarke
3	**Devin Walker-Molaghan**	Marie Roda
3	**Geles Rodriguez**	Anthony Martin
3	**Kenya Scott**	Tevin Grant
3	**Mark Jansen**	Elena Davies
3	Tevin Grant	Kenya Scott
3	Marie Roda	Devin Walker-Molaghan, Anthony Bartolotte, Jason Walsh
3	Anthony Martin	Shannon Duffy, Geles Rodriguez
3	Shannon Duffy	Anthony Martin
3	Elena Davies	Mark Jensen
3	Anthony Bartolotte	Marie Roda
3	Lisa Coffey	Aubrey O'Day
3	Ariana Nova	Cameron Amstrong
3	Alexis McNeal	Cameron Armstrong
3	Cara Cooper	Billy Reilich
3	Kellie Sweet	Demetrius "Mechie" Harris
3	Emily Arreseigor	Billy Reilich
3	Danielle Clarke	Demetrius "Mechie" Harris
3	Max-Davis Kurtzman	Alexa "Lexi" Kaplan
3	Jason Walsh	Marie Roda
3	Tyler Garrigus	Billy Reilich
4	**Adore Delano**	Jakk Maddox, Trenton Clark
4	**Allie DiMeco**	Cameron Sikes, Carlos Chavez
4	**Callum Izzard**	Megan Nash, Paris Decaro
4	**Daniel Maguire**	Sydney Langston
4	**Georgia Steel**	Niall Aslam, Sam Bird
4	**La Demi Martinez**	Tyler Ash
4	**Marlon Williams**	Jemmye Carroll, Todd Maurer
4	**Nicole Zanatta**	Ashley Ceasar, Laurel Stucky (Jemmye Carroll)
4	**Ryan Gallagher**	Magdalena Ruiz
4	**Tyranny Todd**	E'Mari Stevenson
4	Laurel Stucky	Nicole Zanatta
4	Megan Nash	Callum Izzard
4	Jakk Maddox	Adore Delano
4	Sydney Langston	Daniel Maguire
4	Ashley Ceasar	Nicole Zanatta
4	Cameron Sikes	Allie DiMeco
4	Carlos Chavez	Allie DiMeco
4	E'Mari Stevenson	Tyranny Todd
4	Jemmye Carroll	Marlon Williams (Nicole Zanatta)
4	Magdalena Ruiz	Ryan Gallagher
4	Niall Aslam	Georgia Steel
4	Paris Decaro	Calum Izzard
4	Sam Bird	Georgia Steel
4	Todd Mauer	Marlon Williams
4	Trenton Clark	Adore Delano
4	Tyler Ash	La Demi Martinez
5	**Alain Lorenzo**	Sher Suarez
5	**Arisce Wanzer**	Mike Mulderrig
5	**Bryce Hirschberg**	Nicole O'Brien
5	**Da'Vonne Rogers**	Jamar Lee
5	**David Barta**	Danielle Cohen (Mike Mulderrig)
5	**Derynn Paige**	Ricky Rogers
5	**Jonathan Troncoso**	Joelle Brian
5	**Kyra Green**	Emily Salch
5	**Ranin Karim**	Elias Abreu
5	**Ray Gantt**	Caro Viee, Nicole Amelia, Alexis Christina
5	Nicole O'Brien	Bryce Hirschberg
5	Caro Viee	Ray Gantt
5	Emily Salch	Kyra Green
5	Sher Suarez	Alain Lorenzo
5	Kathryn Dunn	Ricky Rogers
5	Jamar Lee	Da'Vonne Rogers, Minh-Ly Nguyen-Cao
5	Minh-Ly Nguyen-Cao	Jamar Lee
5	Ricky Rogers	Derynn Paige, Kathryn Dunn
5	Mike Mulderrig	Arisce Wanzer (David Barta)
5	Danielle Cohen	David Barta
5	Elias Abreu	Ranin Karim
5	Nicole Amelia	Ray Gantt
5	Joelle Brian	Jonathan Troncoso
5	Alexis Christina	Ray Gantt
6	**Ben Salmon**	Kellie Ross
6	**Jade Croft**	—
6	**Holly MacAlpine**	—
6	**Jake O'Brien**	Pala Negara
6	**Jamie Dragon**	—
6	**Thailah T**	Charlie Low
6	**Liam Forrest**	—
6	**Leylah Linda**	Samura Kamara
6	**Sorinn Lillico**	—
6	**Lola De Lepine**	Christopher Patrone
6	**Spari**	Ri Nelson
6	**Shayla Cruz**	—
6	Ri Nelson	Spari
6	Christopher Patrone	Lola De Lepin
6	Samura Kamara	Leylah Linda
6	Charlie Low	Thailah T
6	Pala Negara	Jake O'Brien
6	Ben Salmon	Kellie Ross

Table key
Key: = "Cast member" returns to the beach for the second time.

== Other appearances ==
16 and Pregnant

- Farrah Abraham

The Amazing Race Australia

- Holly MacAlpine – season 6
- Jake O'Brien – season 6

American Idol

- Dani Noriega
- Ryan Gallagher

Are You Smarter than a 5th Grader?

- Danielle Cohen

Are You the One?

- Shanley McIntee – season 1
- Anthony Bartolotte – season 2
- Nelson Thomas – season 3
- Devin Walker-Molaghan – season 3
- Cameron Kolbo – season 4
- Alicia Wright – season 5
- Taylor Selfridge – season 5
- Derrick Henry – season 5
- Andre Siemers – season 5
- Shannon Duffy – season 5
- Tyranny Todd – season 5
- Joe Torgerson – season 6
- Malcolm Drummer – season 6
- Diandra Delgado – season 6
- Nurys Mateo – season 6
- Geles Rodriguez – season 6
- Anthony Martin – season 6
- Kenya Scott – season 7
- Tevin Grant – season 7

Are You the One? Second Chances

- Devin Walker-Molaghan
- Shanley McIntee
- Cameron Kolbo
- Alicia Wright
- Derrick Henry

The Bachelor

- Jasmine Goode – season 21

The Bachelorette

- Chad Johnson – season 12
- Chase McNary – season 12
- Daniel Maguire – season 12

Bachelor in Paradise

- Chad Johnson – season 3
- Daniel Maguire – seasons 3 and 4
- Jasmine Goode – season 4
- Chase McNary – season 6

Bachelor in Paradise Australia

- Daniel Maguire – seasons 1 and 2

Bad Girls Club

- Janelle Shanks – Bad Girls Club: Miami
- Angela Babicz – Bad Girls Club: Twisted Sisters

Big Brother

- Da'Vonne Rogers — seasons 17, 18 and 22
- Paulie Calafiore — season 18
- Jozea Flores — season 18
- Corey Brooks – season 18
- Mark Jensen — season 19
- Elena Davies – season 19
- Kathryn Dunn – season 21

Big Brother Canada

- Jamar Lee — season 8
- Minh-Ly Nguyen-Cao — season 8

Big Brother: Over the Top

- Morgan Willett
- Monte Massongill

Catching Kelce

- Maya Benberry

Celebrity Big Brother UK

- Farrah Abraham — series 16
- Aubrey O'Day — series 18
- Chad Johnson — series 20

La casa de los famosos

- Carlos Chavez — season 5

The Challenge

Cast member	Seasons of The Challenge
Alicia Wright	Vendettas
Angela Babicz	Final Reckoning
Anthony Bartolotte	Invasion of the Champions
Callum Izzard	Battle for a New Champion
Chase McNary	War of the Worlds
Cory Wharton	Battle of the Bloodlines, Rivals III, Invasion of the Champions, XXX: Dirty 30, Vendettas, Final Reckoning, Total Madness, Double Agents, Spies, Lies & Allies, Battle of the Eras
Da'Vonne Rogers	Final Reckoning, War of the Worlds
Demetrius "Mechie" Harris	Double Agents
Derrick Henry	XXX: Dirty 30, Final Reckoning
Devin Walker-Molaghan	Rivals III, XXX: Dirty 30, Vendettas, Final Reckoning, Double Agents, Spies, Lies & Allies, Ride or Dies, Battle of the Eras
Faith Stowers	Final Reckoning, War of the Worlds 2
Jakk Maddox	Ride or Dies
Jay Starrett	Total Madness, Double Agents, Ride or Dies, Battle for a New Champion
Jemmye Carroll	Battle of the Seasons (2012), Rivals II, Free Agents, Battle of the Exes II, XXX: Dirty 30, Vendettas, Final Reckoning
Jozea Flores	Final Reckoning
Laurel Stucky	Fresh Meat II, Cutthroat, Rivals, Free Agents, Invasion of the Champions, War of the Worlds 2, Ride or Dies, Battle of the Eras
Marie Roda	Battle of the Seasons (2012), Invasion of the Champions, XXX: Dirty 30, Vendettas, Final Reckoning
Marlon Williams	Rivals II
Morgan Willett	War of the Worlds
Nelson Thomas	Rivals III, Invasion of the Champions, XXX: Dirty 30, Vendettas, Final Reckoning, Total Madness, Double Agents, Spies, Lies & Allies, Ride or Dies
Nicole Ramos	Battle of the Bloodlines, Rivals III, XXX: Dirty 30, Vendettas
Nicole Zanatta	Invasion of the Champions, Vendettas, Double Agents
Nurys Mateo	Ride or Dies, Battle for a New Champion, Battle of the Eras
Paulie Calafiore	Final Reckoning, War of the Worlds, War of the Worlds 2, Battle of the Eras
Sam Bird	Ride or Dies

The Challenge: All Stars

- Da'Vonne Rogers — season 5
- Devin Walker-Molaghan — season 5
- Jemmye Carroll — seasons 1 and 3
- Laurel Stucky — seasons 4 and 5
- Nicole Zanatta — seasons 4 and 5

The Challenge: Champs vs. Stars

- Cory Wharton — season 1
- Devin Walker-Molaghan — season 2
- Jozea Flores — season 2

The Challenge: USA

- Cory Wharton — season 2
- Paulie Calafiore – season 2

The Challenge UK

- Callum Izzard

The Celebrity Apprentice

- Aubrey O'Day - season 12

Double Shot at Love

- Derynn Paige — season 1
- Ricky Rogers — season 2

Exatlón Estados Unidos

- Carlos Chavez — season 6

Famously Single

- Aubrey O'Day — season 1
- Chad Johnson — season 2

Fire Island

- Cheyenne Parker

Glam Masters

- La Demi Martinez

How Far Is Tattoo Far?

- Paulie Calafiore — season 1
- Cory Wharton — season 2

Inst@famous

- Alexa "Lexi" Kaplan
- Allie Kaplan

Lindsay Lohan's Beach Club

- Mike Mulderrig

Love Island UK

- Georgia Steel – series 4
- Niall Aslam – series 4
- Sam Bird – series 4

Love Island

- Caro Viee – season 1
- Emily Salch – season 1
- Kyra Green – season 1
- Ray Gantt – season 1
- Sher Suarez – season 2

Making the Band

- Aubrey O'Day

Marriage Boot Camp

- Aubrey O'Day – seasons 5 and 13
- Farrah Abraham – season 10

Paradise Hotel

- David Barta – season 3

The Real World

- Jemmye Carroll — The Real World: New Orleans
- Marie Roda — The Real World: St. Thomas
- Marlon Williams — The Real World: Portland
- Ashley Ceasar — Real World: Ex-Plosion
- Cory Wharton — Real World: Ex-Plosion
- Nicole Zanatta — Real World: Skeletons

RuPaul's Drag Race

- Adore Delano — season 6

Survivor

- Jay Starrett — Survivor: Millennials vs. Gen X

Strut

- Arisce Wanzer

Teen Mom

- Farrah Abraham
- Simon Saran
- Cory Wharton
- Taylor Selfridge

Too Hot to Handle

- Bryce Hirschberg – season 1
- Nicole O'Brien – season 1

What Happens at The Abbey

- Murray Swanby
- Cory Zwierzynski
- Billy Reilich

World of Dance

- Jonathan Troncoso – season 3
