= Ex on the Beach (American TV series) season 1 =

Ex on the Beach
- Season 1
- Presented by: Romeo Miller
- No. of housemates: 25
- Location: Hilo, Hawaii
- No. of episodes: 11

Release
- Original network: MTV
- Original release: April 19 – June 28, 2018

Season chronology
- Next → Season 2

The first season of the American version of the reality television show Ex on the Beach, premiered on April 19, 2018, with a launch special airing on April 12. It featured cast members from various reality television shows and first time reality participants living together in Hawaii with their exes.

== Cast ==
Cast member	Original series	Exes
Angela Babicz	Bad Girls Club: Twisted Sisters	Derrick Henry
Chase McNary	The Bachelorette 12	Skyler Mikkelson
Chris Pearson †	—N/a	Chelsko Thompson, Haley Read
Cory Wharton	Real World: Ex-Plosion	Alicia Wright
Faith Stowers	Vanderpump Rules	Marcus Rosenzweig, June Robinson
Jasmine Goode	The Bachelor 21	Marco Delvecchio
Paulie Calafiore	Big Brother 18	Lexi Marsella
Taylor Selfridge	Are You the One? 5	Andre Siemers, Joe Torgerson, Cameron Kolbo
Tor'i Brooks	—N/a	—N/a
Victoria Alario	—N/a	Luis Rivera
Alicia Wright	Are You the One? 5	Derrick Henry, Cory Wharton, Andre Siemers
Derrick Henry	Are You the One? 5	Angela Babicz, Alicia Wright
Skyler Mikkelson	—N/a	Chase McNary
Lexi Marsalla	—N/a	Paulie Calafiore
Chelsko Thompson	—N/a	Chris Pearson
Andre Siemers	Are You the One? 5	Taylor Selfridge, Alicia Wright
Haley Read	—N/a	Chris Pearson
Cameron Kolbo	Are You the One? 4	Taylor Selfridge, Shanley McIntee
June Robinson	—N/a	Faith Stowers
Luis Rivera	—N/a	Victoria Alario
Shanley McIntee	Are You the One? 1	Cameron Kolbo
Marcus Rosenzweig	—N/a	Faith Stowers
Marco Delvecchio	—N/a	Jasmine Goode
Charles Davis	—N/a	—N/a
Joe Torgerson	Are You the One? 6	Taylor Selfridge

=== Cast duration ===
Cast members	Episodes										
Cast members	1	2	3	4	5	6	7	8	9	10	11
Angela											
Chase											
Chris											
Cory											
Faith											
Jasmine											
Paulie											
Taylor											
Tor'i											
Victoria											
Alicia											
Derrick											
Lexi											
Skyler											
Chelsko											
Andre											
Haley											
Cameron											
June											
Luis											
Shanley											
Marcus											
Marco											
Charles											
Joe											

Table key
= The cast member is featured in this episode
= The cast member arrives on the beach
= The cast member has an ex arrive on the beach
= The cast member has two exes arrive on the beach
= The cast member arrives on the beach and has an ex arrive during the same episode
= The cast member leaves the beach
= The cast member arrives on the beach and leaves during the same episode
= The cast member does not feature in this episode

== Episodes ==
No. overall	No. in season	Title	Original release date	U.S. viewers (millions)
1	1	"Welcome to Ex on the Beach"	April 19, 2018	0.93
2	2	"Exed Out"	April 26, 2018	0.72
3	3	"Two Exes Don't Make a Right"	May 3, 2018	0.73
4	4	"I Wanna Call You Babe"	May 10, 2018	0.88
5	5	"Who's Exed Next?"	May 17, 2018	0.84
6	6	"Bye Alicia Hi Alicia"	May 24, 2018	0.69
7	7	"Party Foul"	May 31, 2018	0.89
8	8	"Monster Mode"	June 7, 2018	0.85
9	9	"You Can't Handle the Truth"	June 14, 2018	0.86
10	10	"Return of All the Exes"	June 21, 2018	0.86
11	11	"Can You Ever Get Over Your Ex?"	June 28, 2018	0.84
