= Paulie Calafiore =

American television personality

- Born: Paul R. Calafiore; November 13, 1988 (age 37); Howell Township, New Jersey, U.S.
- Education: Rutgers University
- Occupation: Television personality
- Television: Big Brother (season 18); Ex on the Beach (season 1); How Far Is Tattoo Far?; The Challenge; The Challenge: USA (season 2)
- Relatives: Cody Calafiore (brother)

Paul R. "Paulie" Calafiore (born November 13, 1988) is an American television personality who has competed on season 18 of Big Brother, as well as multiple seasons of The Challenge, and the second season of its spin-off The Challenge: USA. He and his brother Cody Calafiore played in The Soccer Tournament in 2023.

== Early life and education ==
Paulie Calafiore was born in Howell Township, New Jersey, to Paul Jr. and Linda Calafiore. He attended Howell High School, where he says he was bullied, and later played on the soccer team while attending Rutgers University. He was a defensive back and team captain for the Scarlet Knights. His brother is Cody Calafiore, the winner of season 22 of Big Brother. Paulie and Cody also have a sister.

== Career ==
Calafiore is a former professional soccer player. He "had a brief spell" with the Colorado Rapids. Calafiore and his brother played in The Soccer Tournament in 2023. He is also a disc jockey, a model, and a personal trainer.

Calafiore has been cast on multiple television series, including season 18 of Big Brother, season 1 of Ex on the Beach (2018), and multiple iterations of The Challenge: Final Reckoning (2018), War of the Worlds (2019), War of the Worlds 2 (2019), USA (season 2, 2023), and The Challenge 40: Battle of the Eras (2024). On season 18 of Big Brother, he placed eighth overall. Calafiore suffered two concussions on Battle of the Eras. He also made a guest appearance on the second season of Vanderpump Villa.

== Personal life ==
Calafiore has lived in North Carolina. He and co-star Cara Maria Sorbello dated on and off from 2018-2026, after meeting on The Challenge. He came out as bisexual in 2023. He and Sorbello have relocated to Montana.

Calafiore plays the guitar, has practiced martial arts (particularly Krav Maga), and has trained in bobsledding. Queerty has described him as a "fitness pro". He creates content on OnlyFans.

== Filmography ==
=== Television ===
Year	Title	Role	Notes
2016	Big Brother 18	Contestant	8th place
2018	Ex on the Beach	Himself	Season 1, 11 episodes
2018	The Challenge: Final Reckoning	Contestant	3rd place
2018	How Far Is Tattoo Far?	Himself	1 episode
2019	The Challenge: War of the Worlds	Contestant	9th place
2019	The Challenge: War of the Worlds 2	Contestant	Runner-up
2023	The Challenge: USA 2	Contestant	12th place
2024	The Challenge 40: Battle of the Eras	Contestant	20th place
2025	Vanderpump Villa	Himself	Season 2

== See also ==
- List of Big Brother (American TV series) houseguests
- List of bisexual people (A–F)
- List of Ex on the Beach (American TV series) cast members
- List of Rutgers University people
- List of The Challenge (TV series) contestants
