= Game of Clones =

- Genre: Reality dating show
- Narrated by: Carlie Craig
- Country of origin: United States
- Original language: English
- No. of seasons: 1
- No. of episodes: 8

Production
- Executive producers: Jason A. Carbone; Jim Dubensky; Chris Wagner; Jim Roush
- Producer: Sam Bullard
- Cinematography: Mark S. Jacobs
- Production companies: The Roush Wagner Company; Youngest Media

Original release
- Network: MTV
- Release: February 21 – April 4, 2019

Game of Clones is an American reality television dating game show based on a British show of the same name. It premiered on MTV on February 21, 2019.

== Cast ==
Cast member	Original series	Celebrity clones
Pauly D	Jersey Shore	Megan Fox
Kailyn Lowry	Teen Mom 2	Quavo
Nicole Zanatta	Real World: Skeletons	Ciara
Derrick Henry	Are You the One? 5	Gigi Hadid
Kam Williams	Are You the One? 5	Dwayne Johnson
Cara Maria Sorbello	The Challenge: Fresh Meat II	Jason Momoa
Leroy Garrett	The Real World: Las Vegas	Jennifer Lopez

== Episodes ==
No.	Title	Original release date	U.S. viewers (millions)
1	"Clones Are Here!"	February 21, 2019	0.47
2	"Clone Culture"	February 28, 2019	0.36
3	"Clones Make It Twerk"	March 7, 2019	0.31
4	"Super Model Citizens"	March 14, 2019	0.32
5	"Kam on The Rocks"	March 21, 2019	0.26
6	"Cara Maria and Her Man-oas"	March 28, 2019	0.21
7	"Leroy Waits For Tonight"	April 4, 2019	0.33
8	"Final One and Clonely"	April 4, 2019	0.24

== International versions ==
Country	Local title	Original channel	Premiere date	Ref
Brazil	Game dos Clones	Amazon Prime Video	October 16, 2020	
France	Game of Clones - Au-delà des Apparences	NRJ12	2018	
Germany	Game of Clones - Ein Klon zum Verlieben	RTL2	2019	
United Kingdom	Game of Clones	E4	27 February-24 March 2017	
