= Real World: Skeletons =

Coordinates: 41°53′04.5″N 87°39′16.8″W

- Season 30
- The cast of Real World: Skeletons
- Starring: Bruno Bettencourt; Jason Hill; Madison Walls; Nicole Zanatta; Sylvia Elsrode; Tony Raines; Violetta Milerman
- No. of episodes: 13

Release
- Original network: MTV
- Original release: December 16, 2014 – March 10, 2015

Season chronology
- ← Previous; Real World: Ex-Plosion Next → Real World: Go Big or Go Home

Real World: Skeletons is the thirtieth season of MTV's reality television series Real World, which focuses on a group of diverse strangers living together for several months in a different city each season, as cameras document their lives and interpersonal relationships. It is the second season of Real World to be filmed in the East North Central States region of the United States, specifically in Chicago, Illinois after The Real World: Chicago.

The season featured a total of seven people with an additional 11 rotating guests who were the "Skeletons." It is the eighth season to take place in a city that had hosted a previous season, as the show's eleventh season was set in Chicago in 2002. Chicago was first reported as the location for the 30th season in a June 2014 article by Crain's Chicago Business. Production began on August 8, 2014, and concluded on October 20, 2014 totaling up to 74 days of filming. The season premiered on December 16 of that year, consisting of 13 episodes.

This season marks the first time that the show has aired on a night other than a Wednesday since the seventeenth season. No reunion special was produced, marking the first time since the tenth season in 2001.

== Season changes ==
Each week, one cast member is faced with people from their past ("skeletons") who they have unresolved issues with at the moment relating to family, romance, work, and socialization. Unlike the previous season, the surprise guests only have the option to live in the house for only one week.

== Employment ==
Beginning in the 28th season, certain jobs in the area were approved by production that the cast had the liberty to apply for independently if desired. This season, the entire cast worked in groups of two or three as bartenders, barbacks, and waiters at three Chicago bars and nightclubs: Vincenzo’s Sports Tavern, Old Fifth, and Red Kiva. Red Kiva was located next door to the cast residence before being demolished in 2019.

== Residence ==
During shooting, the cast lived at 1100 W. Randolph Street in the West Loop neighborhood, the location of Bon V, a former nightclub. The property was demolished in late September 2019 along with the cast's workplace Red Kiva.

== Cast ==
The season started off with seven roommates, and then the cast was joined at different points by eleven additional guests, who each were chosen to visit for a week. The additional guests are Skeletons, people who have unresolved issues with the originals at the moment relating to family, romance, work, and socialization, but they are not officially part of the cast.

| Cast member | Age^{1} | Hometown | Biography |
|---|---|---|---|
| Bruno Bettencourt | 24 | East Providence, Rhode Island | Bruno is a Portuguese-American fitness fanatic from Rhode Island who works for his father's construction company. His skeleton is his brother Briah, who arrived to the house in episode 10, whom he has not spoken to in three years after Briah personally attacked him during a verbal argument over a tuna sandwich. In episode 10, Bruno shares his history with anger, and explains how it came from his father giving him tough love when he was younger. |
| Jason Hill | 24 | Raleigh, North Carolina | Jason is originally from Fayetteville, North Carolina, but lives in Raleigh, North Carolina where he worked as a car salesman. He was raised by a single mother and played football at Campbell University and resents his father for leaving when Jason was a baby. His father, Lafayette, is his skeleton, who arrived to the house in the season finale. While being in Chicago, Jason has a daughter on the way. |
| Madison Walls | 23 | Austin, Texas | Madison is a former child actress who recovered from a heroin addiction two years ago and is seeking a fresh start. Her skeletons are former acquaintances who suffered as a result of her addiction: her stepsister Rachel, who arrived to the house in episode 11, and ex Skyler, who arrived to the house in episode 12. |
| Nicole Zanatta | 23 | Annadale, New York | Nicole participated in track and field at Tottenville High School, graduated from St. John's University, and works as an EMT on Staten Island. Her skeletons are her triplet sisters, Ashley and Samantha, who both arrived to the house in episode 9, whom are both about to get married and move out while Nicole has no interest in settling down. |
| Sylvia Elsrode | 25 | Kansas City, Missouri | Sylvia graduated from Oak Park High School in 2007, and works as a bartender, saleswoman, and aspiring actress in Kansas City. Her skeleton is a former "boss from hell", Alicia, who arrived to the house in episode 4. In episode 2, she explains her past with abuse from her ex-boyfriend when she was 15. She also reveals that she was pregnant by him, but she had a miscarriage. |
| Tony Raines | 25 | Folsom, Louisiana | Tony is an aspiring actor and is a former chemical plant worker who is originally from Metairie, Louisiana, and lived in Baton Rouge, Louisiana before leaving for the show. His skeletons are former girlfriends, Elizabeth and Alyssa, who both arrived to the house in episode 6. |
| Violetta Milerman | 23 | Sarasota, Florida | Violetta is originally from Moldova, but moved to the United States over 10 years ago. She currently resides in Sarasota, Florida, where she graduated from high school in 2009, and is enrolled in college at State College of Florida, Manatee-Sarasota. Her skeletons are former acquaintances, Jessica and Tia, who both arrived to the house in episode 8, whom have been involved in cyber and verbal harassment with Violetta. Milerman later reveals she is suffering from anorexia and bulimia due to past bullying about her weight. |
The Skeletons
| Alicia Glenny | 24 | Kansas City, Missouri | Designated as Sylvia's "Boss from hell". Alicia and Sylvia used to be friends until Alicia earned her role of the boss which is when she and Sylvia's friendship went sour. After she and Sylvia were no longer friends Alicia then started telling people that Sylvia slept with one of her closest friends' boyfriends causing her to quit. Entering the Real World house, Alicia gets into a heated argument with roommate Violetta turning everyone in the house (except for Madison) against her. In episode 5, Alicia voluntarily leaves the house after not feeling welcomed, leaving her and Sylvia's relationship undecided. |
| Elizabeth Hagan | 25 | Baton Rouge, Louisiana | Elizabeth is Tony's girl from back home but they decided to break up when Tony came to the Real World. Elizabeth quickly rubs all of the roommates the wrong way with her princess-like attitude and accuses the cast of acting for camera time. Elizabeth and Tony come to an equal decision to no longer speak to each other when the show is over. |
| Alyssa Giacone | 23 | Walker, Louisiana | Alyssa is Tony's Stalker/ex-girlfriend, the two met in high school where they were inseparable. Alyssa claims she is still in love with Tony. |
| Tia Kuttig | 23 | Sarasota, Florida | Tia is Violetta's ½ enemies. Tia and Violetta do not like each other because of reasons undisclosed on the show. Tia and Violetta connected over Violetta's eating disorder. |
| Jessica Marino | 25 | Sarasota, Florida | Jessica is Violetta's enemy. Violetta claims Jessica made an Instagram account bashing Violetta and her friends, possibly in retaliation to Violetta posting Jessica's nose-job pictures on Facebook. |
| Ashley & Samantha Zanatta | 23 | Staten Island, New York | Ashley and Samantha are Nicole's sisters. They grew up very close and were always inseparable with them being triplets. With both Samantha and Ashley getting married, them coming to Chicago is the last time they have together before going their separate ways. |
| Briah Bettencourt | 22 | East Providence, Rhode Island | Briah is Bruno's brother, the two no longer speak due to a heated argument over a tuna fish sandwich in which Briah told Bruno he wished he died in the car accident Bruno suffered a few years back. Briah apologized to Bruno for the comment and the two rekindled the relationship. |
| Rachel Shapshak | 20 | Austin, Texas | Rachel is Madison's step-sister, the two were really close growing up but when Madison started falling into a drug addiction their relationship began to fade. Rachel and Madison have since become closer. |
| Skyler Russ | 21 | Austin, Texas | Skyler is Madison's ex, the two were dating for a couple years, but when Madison started her drug addiction he backed away from that relationship. |
| Lafayette Ricks | 50 | Durham, North Carolina | Lafayette Ricks is Jason's father, at a very young age Lafayette left Jason with only his mother to raise him. With Jason having a child on the way he wants to break the cycle and be there for his daughter like his father never was. The two rekindled things and have plans to keep in contact. |

^1 Age at time of filming
Skeletons in order of arrival

== Episodes ==
| No. overall | No. in season | Title | Original release date | U.S. viewers (millions) |
|---|---|---|---|---|
| 566 | 1 | "Skeleton Keys" | December 16, 2014 | 0.65 |
Seven strangers move in together. They will soon be forced to confront the last person on Earth they want to see.
| 567 | 2 | "Love and Other Drugs" | December 23, 2014 | 0.51 |
When the roommates clash with Madison, she reveals a haunting secret; Bruno and Sylvia's romance is jeopardized by jealousy.
| 568 | 3 | "Three Way" | December 30, 2014 | 0.67 |
Tension between the housemates rises over wild parties and scandalous hookups; a battle between Jason and Violetta results in the revelation of another secret.
| 569 | 4 | "Blast From The Past" | January 6, 2015 | 0.84 |
Tensions come to head when Sylvia's skeleton comes into the house.
| 570 | 5 | "Dirty Laundry" | January 12, 2015 | 0.81 |
The first Skeleton ambushes the roommates; Sylvia's past returns to haunt her; Tony and Madison restart their romance.
| 571 | 6 | "A Royal Nightmare" | January 20, 2015 | 1.02 |
Tony is shocked when two of his Skeletons move in, creating a battle for his affection between them and Madison.
| 572 | 7 | "All the King's Women" | January 27, 2015 | 1.13 |
Tony has his work cut out for him with three of his lovers in the house. Violetta's annoyance with Madison erupts into a physical altercation which Sylvia jumps into in order to defend Violetta. After watching the fight back, Violetta is disgusted by her actions and apologizes to Madison. Sylvia doesn't feel like she needs to but also apologizes. Tony attempts to sort out his feelings for the girls in his life. He finally tells Alyssa what she needed to hear: that he doesn't love her anymore. Elizabeth officially breaks things off with Tony for good.
| 573 | 8 | "Sarasota's Finest" | February 3, 2015 | 0.94 |
The roommates worry about Violetta's eating habits when she quickly loses weight. Violetta is in for a shock when two of her enemies arrive at the house: Jessica, who is rumored to have started a hateful Instagram page about her and Tia, who called Violetta and her friends "coke-whores." After Violetta and Bruno trade negative remarks at each other, Bruno explodes in anger and Violetta finally talks about her eating disorder. Tony juggles his feelings for Jessica and Madison. Violetta, Tia and Jessica learn a valuable lesson about gossiping when they decide to bury the hatchet.
| 574 | 9 | "Where's the Beef?" | February 10, 2015 | 0.99 |
Nicole receives two surprising skeletons. Tensions run high after the new skeleton is arriving into the house.
| 575 | 10 | "Brother in Arms" | February 17, 2015 | 0.95 |
Bruno's skeleton comes into the house. Tony gets a visit from his brother Shane. Also tensions blow between Sylvia, Tony and Shane against Bruno and Briah.
| 576 | 11 | "Breaking Mad" | February 24, 2015 | 0.86 |
Madison's sister and first skeleton comes into the house to confront her about her past drug addiction. Also Jason embraces fatherhood.
| 577 | 12 | "Wine and Roses" | March 3, 2015 | 1.03 |
A surprise mystery skeleton leaves the house scrambling when Madison receives another skeleton. Tensions run high between Jason and Nicole after a bar fight.
| 578 | 13 | "The Final Skeleton" | March 10, 2015 | 0.97 |
After a shocking fight between best friends Jason and Nicole, Jason receives the biggest skeleton this season. The cast say goodbye to Chicago.

== After filming ==
On August 10, 2015, it was announced that Madison and Tony were expecting their first child. On February 16, 2016, Madison and Tony welcomed their daughter, Harper. Nine months after Harper was born, on November 7, 2016, Tony and his former skeleton, Alyssa Giacone, welcomed a daughter, Isla. In July 2018, Madison's parents requested sole custody of Harper. In October of the same year, Madison' parents and Tony agreed to a temporary custody order amid claims that Walls relapsed on drugs use.

In 2017, Walls briefly dated Teen Mom 2 star Javi Marroquin.

Tony and Alyssa appeared on the second season of How Far Is Tattoo Far? The couple got engaged at the Reunion special of The Challenge: Final Reckoning, and ultimately got married on October 14, 2023.

In 2019, Nicole appeared on Game of Clones looking for a Ciara lookalike, and later on the fourth season of Ex on the Beach with exes Laurel Stucky, Ashley Ceasar and Jemmye Carroll. After exiting Ex on the Beach together, Nicole and Ashley appeared on True Life Presents: Quarantine Stories. Zanatta welcomed twin daughters Seraphina and Madyson on May 1, 2026.

Sylvia Elsrode became a real estate agent and appeared on House Hunters. On September 21, 2024, Elsrode married Sergio Lira, with whom she shares two children.

=== The Challenge ===
| Cast member | Seasons of The Challenge | Other appearances |
|---|---|---|
| Bruno Bettencourt | Invasion of the Champions | —N/a |
| Jason Hill | —N/a | —N/a |
| Madison Walls | —N/a | —N/a |
| Nicole Zanatta | Invasion of the Champions, Vendettas, Double Agents | The Challenge: All Stars (season 4), The Challenge: All Stars (season 5) |
| Sylvia Elsrode | Invasion of the Champions, Vendettas, Final Reckoning | The Challenge: All Stars (season 3), The Challenge: All Stars (season 5) |
| Tony Raines | Battle of the Bloodlines, Rivals III, Invasion of the Champions, XXX: Dirty 30, Vendettas, Final Reckoning, Battle of the Eras | The Challenge: Champs vs. Stars (season 2), The Challenge: All Stars (season 4) |
| Violetta Milerman | —N/a | —N/a |
