= The Challenge: Vendettas =

31st season of the reality television series

Vendettas
- Season 31
- Presented by: T. J. Lavin
- No. of contestants: 28
- Winner: Cara Maria Sorbello
- Location: Gibraltar, BOT; Marbella, Spain; Prague, Czech Republic
- No. of episodes: 16 (including the two-part Reunion special/finale)

Release
- Original network: MTV
- Original release: January 2 – April 17, 2018

Season chronology
- ← Previous; XXX: Dirty 30 Next → Final Reckoning

The Challenge: Vendettas is the 31st season of MTV reality competition series, The Challenge. For the first time, this season featured alumni from the US version of Big Brother, and the UK TV shows Ex on the Beach and Geordie Shore, competing with alumni from The Real World, Road Rules, The Challenge, and Are You the One?. For the first time ever, there was only one winner.

== Format ==
The cast of the thirty-first season of The Challenge, excluding Tony Raines

28 players – each with unresolved grudges with other contestants – compete to survive in the game and win their share of $500,000. Each round is designated as a male, female or genderless round. The main elements of the game are as follows:

- Daily Missions: Each round, the players compete in a challenge. The challenges vary between individual and team challenges. The winners split $25,000 for their individual bank accounts.
  - In an individual challenge, the three best performers in the challenge form the Troika, while the worst-performer of the designated gender is nominated for elimination.
  - In team challenges, the winning team elects the Troika among themselves, while the losing team must vote immediately and publicly for a teammate of the designated gender to face elimination.
- Troika & Inquisition: The three players in the Troika are immune from entering the Elimination Round. They nominate three players of the designated gender for the Elimination Round. The nominees face the "Inquisition", where they have the chance to plead their case to the Troika as to why they should not be voted-in to the Elimination Round.
- Elimination Rounds (The Ring): In "The Ring", the Troika votes for one of the players who faced the Inquisition to compete in the Elimination Round. The winners stay in the game, and earn a "Grenade". Grenades hold power that can be used on any other player by the elimination winner. The losers of the elimination round go home, and their individual bank accounts total is added to the final prize fund.

When eight players remain, they compete individually in the Final Challenge for their share of the $500,000 prize. Only the Top 4 players win the money in their bank account. Additionally, first place is awarded the money from the bank accounts of every eliminated player as well as an additional $150,000. Second place receives an additional $35,000, third place an additional $10,000 and the fourth place an additional $5,000. The other four finalists receive nothing.

Twists

- Purges: Some challenges are designated as Purges, where the worst competitors are immediately eliminated.
  - In the opening "Get Off the Rock" challenge, the worst-performing male and female are eliminated.
  - In the "Help Me, Rhonda" challenge, the worst-performing male and female are eliminated.
  - Due to uneven ratio of Males to Females, the "Outside the Box" challenge is also a Male Purge, with the worst-finishing male being eliminated.
- Mercenaries: For some of the Elimination Rounds, the nominated players face the Mercenaries instead of each other. The Mercenaries are experienced veterans, returning to The Challenge for a one-off challenge. Mercenary rounds occur during rounds that feature both a male and female elimination. A player winning against the Mercenary stays in the game, losing against the Mercenary eliminates the player. This means that all four or none of the nominated players could be eliminated depending on the results of each test.
  - In the "Crazy 8" Elimination Round, the female nominees would face either Aneesa Ferreira or Tori Deal. The male nominees would face either Derrick Kosinski or Jordan Wiseley.
  - In the "Yankin' My Chain" challenge, the female nominees would face either Ashley Mitchell or Laurel Stucky. The male nominees face either Darrell Taylor or Frank Sweeney.

== Contestants ==
Male contestants	Original season	Finish
Zach Nichols	The Real World: San Diego (2011)	Runner-up
Kyle Christie	Geordie Shore 8	Third place
Leroy Garrett	The Real World: Las Vegas (2011)	Finalist
Tony Raines	Real World: Skeletons	Finalist
Brad Fiorenza	The Real World: San Diego (2004)	Episode 13
Nelson Thomas	Are You the One? 3	Episode 13
Devin Walker-Molaghan	Are You the One? 3	Episode 13
Johnny "Bananas" Devenanzio	The Real World: Key West	Episode 10
Joss Mooney	Ex on the Beach UK 1	Episode 8
Shane Landrum	Road Rules: Campus Crawl	Episode 7
Victor Arroyo	Big Brother 18	Episode 7
Cory Wharton	Real World: Ex-Plosion	Episode 3
Eddie Williams	Are You the One? 5	Episode 2 (Note: Eddie withdrew from the competition prior the "Who's Got Balls?" challenge in episode 2. His exit was not shown on-screen.)
Rogan O'Connor	Ex on the Beach UK 2	Episode 1

Female contestants	Original season	Finish
Cara Maria Sorbello	The Challenge: Fresh Meat II	Winner
Kailah Casillas	Real World: Go Big or Go Home	Fourth place
Kam Williams	Are You the One? 5	Finalist
Nicole Zanatta	Real World: Skeletons	Finalist (Note: Nicole Z. was forced to withdraw from the final challenge, after she suffered an ankle injury on the first stage.)
Jemmye Carroll	The Real World: New Orleans (2010)	Episode 13
Natalie Negrotti	Big Brother 18	Episode 12
Britni Thornton	Are You the One? 3	Episode 11
Kayleigh Morris	Ex on the Beach UK 2	Episode 10 (Note: At the end of Episode 10, Kayleigh withdrew from the competition, following an incident in which Britni, Jemmye and Kailah threw her belongings from a balcony at the house.)
Marie Roda	The Real World: St. Thomas	Episode 9
Veronica Portillo	Road Rules: Semester at Sea	Episode 7/8 (Note: Veronica was forced to withdraw after dislocating her finger against Aneesa in the "Crazy 8" elimination.)
Sylvia Elsrode	Real World: Skeletons	Episode 7 (Note: Prior to the "Puppet Master" challenge in episode 7, Sylvia was medically removed from the competition, after she was deemed too sick to continue competing.)
Melissa Reeves	Ex on the Beach UK 2	Episode 5
Alicia Wright	Are You the One? 5	Episode 4
Nicole Ramos	The Challenge: Battle of the Bloodlines	Episode 1

=== Mercenaries ===
Mercenaries	Original season
Aneesa Ferreira	The Real World: Chicago
Ashley Mitchell	Real World: Ex-Plosion
Darrell Taylor	Road Rules: Campus Crawl
Derrick Kosinski	Road Rules: X-Treme
Frank Sweeney	The Real World: San Diego (2011)
Jordan Wiseley	The Real World: Portland
Laurel Stucky	The Challenge: Fresh Meat II
Tori Deal	Are You the One? 4

== Gameplay ==
=== Challenge games ===
- Get Off the Rock: This purge challenge is an overnight endurance race up the 1400-foot Rock of Gibraltar. For the first phase, contestants race through the streets of Gibraltar to a checkpoint in tunnels at the base of the rock, where they then must stand in a subway car overnight holding weighted boxes. The following day, players continue the race up the Rock of Gibraltar with staggered starts based on how they finished the first phase. The first-place finisher wins $25,000, while the slowest male and female contestants are immediately eliminated.
  - Winner: Joss
  - Eliminated: Nicole R. & Rogan
- Who's Got Balls?: Played in two heats, male and female, contestants must dive into a soapy pit and retrieve soccer balls, pull themselves back out of the pit using ropes, and deposit the balls into their respective bin. The first contestant to deposit three balls into their bin wins.
  - Winners: Bananas & Britni
- #Vendettas: Played on a giant hashtag structure lifted above water, this challenge is played in heats separated by gender. Contestants must take their 4 "hashtag" figures, and place them onto 4 separate opponents' poles. The fastest male and female to place their hashtags on their opponents' poles and make it back to their own pole win the challenge.
  - Winners: Devin & Natalie
- Food Wars: Contestants are divided into 7 teams of 3 and 1 team of 2. At the beginning of each round, they are asked a question, and the first team to buzz in is allowed to answer. If they get it right, they win that question and will then be able to select one other team to be safe from eating while every other team has to select a member to consume a food of the winning choosing team's choosing. If the members of the eating team are unable to finish their dish in the allotted time, their team is eliminated. The final round between the final two teams is an eating competition, with the first team to finish the dish winning.
  - Winners: Marie, Tony & Zach
- Gasping for Air: Played at night, contestants are divided into 4 teams. Each contestant takes a turn diving underwater down 15 feet, and then moving a metal ring along a rope stretched 150 feet underwater. There are three checkpoint stations for the contestants to stop and breathe out of oxygen tanks while underwater. The team that moves their rings the overall longest distance wins.
  - Winners: Bananas, Kailah, Kyle, Tony & Zach
- Puppet Master: Contestants are split into two teams and are chained together in one long chain. While chained together, contestants must work together to assemble pieces of a giant puppet together (with Aneesa and CT heads). The first team to do so, and pull the rope raising their puppet, wins.
  - Winners: Bananas, Brad, Cara Maria, Jemmye, Kayleigh, Kyle, Natalie, Nicole Z., Shane & Tony
- Car Crash: This challenge entails five cars that are lifting into the air over water and are being sprayed with water. Contestants are separated into 4 teams. Each member of the team must jump from car to car, going through the backseat once completing the jump. The team with the fastest contestant to complete the jumps wins.
  - Winners: Bananas, Cara Maria, Natalie & Nelson
- Kicking Ass: Contestants are divided into two teams and are playing a game of soccer. However, they will be playing on pogo stilts while in giant plastic bubbles. The first team to score two goals on their opponents wins.
  - Winners: Brad, Kailah, Kam, Kyle, Natalie, Nicole Z., Tony & Zach
- This Land Is My Land: Competitors are split into three teams. Each team has to stack up forty-five palates in order to raise their flag. Each team is split into three groups: Fabricators, who stack the palates; Suppliers, in charge of supplying the palates by running the palates that roamers supply them to the Fabricators; and Roamers, who must run across the beach and are in charge of supplying the Suppliers through a reservoir or stealing from other teams. The first team to stack their palates and raise their flag wins.
  - Winners: Britni, Natalie, Nicole Z., Tony & Zach
- Spanish Treasure: Contestants are divided into two teams. Each competitor on the team has to go one at a time to swim over to retrieve a ball. The competitor then has to dive down underwater and place the ball into a net attached to a treasure chest, elevating it slightly. They then swim back and touch a checkpoint before the next competitor on their team can go. Once the chest is brought up to the surface, the team is allowed to bring it back to shore, ending the mission. The team who does this the fastest wins.
  - Winners: Brad, Devin, Jemmye, Natalie, Nicole Z., Tony & Zach
- Help Me, Rhonda: This is an individual endurance competition. Competitors each have to race one mile up a hill towards Puente Nuevo bridge, where they then have to zipline across a chasm. They then have to run through the streets of Ronda back towards the bridge, before rappelling down the side of the bridge and then running to the finish line. The fastest male and female contestants win, while the slowest male and female contestants are eliminated.
  - Winners: Nicole Z. & Zach
  - Eliminated: Devin & Jemmye
- Outside the Box: Played individually, players are hooked to a moving semi-truck and forced to traverse from the truck to a dangling pillar with stacked boxes in-between. Players push themselves, alternating between the truck and pillars, weaving between the stacks of boxes. The boxes have varying point values, and if the player knocks over the stack of boxes, those points are added to their overall score. In addition, if a player fails to make the transfer, they receive a transfer penalty. Those with the fewest points wins and gets an automatic ticket into the final challenge. The last place male is eliminated.
  - Winners: Kailah & Tony
  - Eliminated: Nelson

=== Ring games ===
- Balls of Fire: Placed on opposite sides of the Ring in front of two goals, players must kick soccer balls through a wall of fire into their opponent's goal. The player to score the best of three wins and earns a grenade. In the event that nobody can score a goal for an extended period of time the game would be played in a sudden death round.
  - Played by: Cory vs. Nelson
- Chain Reaction: Players start at the bottom of a chain ladder with only one rung connected on it and the remaining ones disconnected. Players must build the rungs one by one while climbing their ladder until they can reach a bell. The first player to ring the bell wins and earns a grenade.
  - Played by: Alicia vs. Melissa
- Oil and Water: While in an oil pit, players must retrieve a ball that is dropped down a peg board. Once they have retrieved the ball they must place it in their basket to score a point. During this elimination players must remain on their hands and knees at all time unless they are about to score. The first player to score three points wins and earns a grenade.
  - Played by: Melissa vs. Sylvia
- Troubled Water: While in a tank of water, the contestants have to use their bodies to remove water until they reach the red line in the tank. Once they get to the red line, they use a hammer to break the bottom of the tank. The first player to do so wins and earns a grenade.
  - Played by: Brad vs. Victor
- Crazy 8: Players wrestle for a ring in the shape of a figure 8. The first player to get the ring to their side twice wins the elimination. The players who win against the Mercenaries stay in the game and earn a grenade.
  - Played by: Jordan vs. Shane, Aneesa vs. Veronica, Kam vs. Tori, Derrick vs. Joss
- Basket Case: Players start locked inside of a Spanish basket and must claw, smash, and tear their way out of their basket as quickly as they can. Once they have left their basket, players must run to their puzzle board and complete it as quickly as possible. The first player to successfully complete their puzzle wins and earns a grenade.
  - Played by: Kailah vs. Marie
- Not So Bright: Players will each start in front of their podiums facing their puzzle board. They press the button on their podium causing the lights on their board to partially light up. The players must then run to their board and flip the switches for those lights that are off. The puzzle board only remains lit when a player is touching their button so the players have to memorize which switches need to be turned on without accidentally turning any off. The first player to successfully light their puzzle board in its entirety wins and earns a grenade.
  - Played by: Bananas vs. Devin
- Yankin' My Chain: Players start harnessed together, back-to-back, on a circular track and must run around the track to reach a bell that is on their opponent's side. The first player to reach and ring their bell wins. The players who win against the Mercenaries stay in the game and earn a grenade.
  - Played by: Brad vs. Frank, Ashley vs. Kam, Darrell vs. Nelson, Britni vs. Laurel
- Spanish Torture: Players are tied and harnessed to two ropes running across the ring, one for their hands and one for their feet, and must shimmy across these ropes in order to ring a bell at the end. The first player to make it across and ring their bell wins and earns a grenade.
  - Played by: Kam vs. Natalie
- Head Banger: Players start on either side of a wall and charge through two walls as quickly as possible. After breaking through the second wall, players find two oversized balls that they must use to smash through a metal grate that reveals two smaller balls that must be deposited in their tube. The first player to deposit both smaller balls into their tube wins.
  - Played by: Brad vs. Leroy

=== Final Challenge ===
First Stage: In the first stage of the final challenge, players must run along a course and complete three checkpoints. Before attempting each checkpoint players must retrieve a token found at the end of the mile and a half long course. Additionally, players will be required to wear various pieces of medieval equipment that will slow them down. For the lap to the first checkpoint players feet will be shackled together by chains. For the lap to the final checkpoint, players must each wear an entire suit of armor while they finish the course. The first two male players and first two female players to complete the stage advance to Stage 2. The remaining four players are eliminated from the final challenge and their bank accounts is added to the final prize.

Checkpoints

- This is Torch'er: Each player start with their own basket of torches. One at a time, players must take their entire basket of torches to the opposite end of the muddy field. Once a player has moved all of their torches they may advance to the next checkpoint.
  - Grenade: Players may simply return to their basket after depositing their torch or they may take a torch from their opponent's basket and return it to their starting basket before retrieving their own torch.
- Decked Out: Players enter a dungeon where they face either Bananas or Melissa who serve as Mercenaries. The Mercenaries serve as card dealers and each player must guess whether the next card is going to be higher or lower than the first, aces being high. If the player correctly guesses two of three cards they advance to the final checkpoint. If the Mercenary wins they assign the player a grenade that they must complete before advancing.
  - Grenade: If a Mercenary won, they could decide between drinking a glass of water, completing 50 jumping jacks or burying a log in the ground, as a grenade for their opponent.
- Backstabber: Upon reaching the checkpoint each player must wait for the next of their fellow players to arrive before playing. Competing one on one, one by one, players must remove swords from their board in amounts of one, two, or three. The player with one sword remaining on their board wins and advance to the finish line. (Note: Because Nicole Z. was disqualified due to an injury, Kam, the last person to arrive to the checkpoint. simply had to remove all of the swords before advancing.)
  - Grenade: The winner also assign their opponent one of three "ancient" dishes; cheese, hot chocolate, or spicy tripe soup, to consume before being able to advance.
- Eliminated: Kam, Leroy, Tony, Nicole Z. (DQ)
- Memory Smash: In the second stage of the final challenge players must memorize a puzzle key featuring various colored circles. Once they have memorized a portion of their puzzle they must go inside the castle and to the courtyard where they must recreate the puzzle on their own individual board. The first male and female to finish stage 1 were given a 30-second head start. The first player to successfully match their color board with the answer key is declared the winner and receive over $370,000, the final prize plus the cumulated bank accounts of all of the eliminated players. Second, third, and fourth place receive $35,000, $10,000, and $5,000 respectively. Each finalist also receive the money earned from their bank accounts throughout the season.

Final results

- Winner: Cara Maria ($378,750)
- Runner-up: Zach ($72,125)
- Third place: Kyle ($20,625)
- Fourth place: Kailah ($25,625)

== Game summary ==
Episode		Gender	Challenge type	Winners	Troika	Ring contestants				Ring game	Ring outcome	
#	Challenge	Gender	Challenge type	Winners	Troika	Last-place	Troika's pick			Ring game	Winner	Eliminated
1	Get Off the Rock	—N/a	Individual	Joss	—N/a							Rogan
1	Get Off the Rock	—N/a	Individual	Joss	—N/a							Nicole R.
2/3	Who's Got Balls?	Male	Individual	Bananas	Bananas, Kyle, Brad	Nelson	**Cory**	Tony	Victor	Balls of Fire	Nelson	Cory
2/3	Who's Got Balls?	Male	Individual	Britni	Bananas, Kyle, Brad	Nelson	**Cory**	Tony	Victor	Balls of Fire	Nelson	Cory
3/4	#Vendettas	Female	Individual	Devin	Devin, Natalie, Bananas	Melissa (Note: In episode 3, Melissa suffered an accident at the house in which she lacerated her foot and was medically prohibited from competing in the "#Vendettas" challenge, due to the fact that it involved water. As a result, Melissa was automatically sent to "The Ring", instead of the last-place male.)	**Alicia**	Kam	Kayleigh	Chain Reaction	Melissa	Alicia
3/4	#Vendettas	Female	Individual	Natalie	Devin, Natalie, Bananas	Melissa	**Alicia**	Kam	Kayleigh	Chain Reaction	Melissa	Alicia
4/5	Food Wars	Female (Note: In episode 4, "The Ring" was deemed genderless; however, as Sylvia was named the last place competitor, it became a female elimination week.)	7 teams of 3 & 1 team of 2	Team 6	Marie, Tony, Zach	Sylvia	Britni	Kayleigh	**Melissa**	Oil and Water	Sylvia	Melissa
6/7 (Note: In episode 6, Natalie and Sylvia were deemed too sick to compete in the "Gasping for Air" challenge, but were safe due to the fact that it was a male elimination week. In addition, the grenade that Sylvia earned as the result of winning in "The Ring" in the previous episode was a "dud.")	Gasping for Air	Male	4 teams of 5	Team 4	Tony, Bananas, Kyle	Brad	Devin	Shane	**Victor**	Troubled Water	Brad	Victor
7/8 (Note: Jordan Wiseley, Derrick Kosinski, Aneesa Ferreira, and Tori Deal were brought in as Mercenaries to compete against Shane, Joss, Veronica, and Kam respectively.)	Puppet Master	—N/a	2 teams of 10	Green Team	Kyle, Nicole Z, Tony	Joss	Devin	Nelson	**Shane**	Crazy 8	Jordan	Shane
7/8	Puppet Master	—N/a	2 teams of 10	Green Team	Kyle, Nicole Z, Tony	Joss	Devin	Nelson	**Shane**	Crazy 8	Aneesa	Veronica
7/8	Puppet Master	—N/a	2 teams of 10	Green Team	Kyle, Nicole Z, Tony	Veronica	**Kam**	Kayleigh	Natalie	Crazy 8	Kam	Tori
7/8	Puppet Master	—N/a	2 teams of 10	Green Team	Kyle, Nicole Z, Tony	Veronica	**Kam**	Kayleigh	Natalie	Crazy 8	Derrick	Joss
8/9	Car Crash	Female	3 teams of 4 & 1 team of 5	Team 1	Bananas, Natalie, Nelson	Marie	Cara Maria	**Kailah**	Nicole Z.	Basket Case	Kailah	Marie
9/10	Kickin' Ass	Male	2 teams of 8	Blue Team	Kailah, Tony, Zach	Devin	**Bananas**	Leroy	Nelson	Not So Bright	Devin	Bananas
11 (Note: Frank Sweeney, Ashley Mitchell, Darrell Taylor, and Laurel Stucky were brought in as Mercenaries to compete against Brad, Kam, Nelson, and Britni respectively.)	This Land Is My Land	—N/a	2 teams of 5 & 1 team of 4	Green Team	Natalie, Tony, Zach	Brad	Kyle	Leroy	**Nelson**	Yankin' My Chain	Brad	Frank
11	This Land Is My Land	—N/a	2 teams of 5 & 1 team of 4	Green Team	Natalie, Tony, Zach	Brad	Kyle	Leroy	**Nelson**	Yankin' My Chain	Kam	Ashley
11	This Land Is My Land	—N/a	2 teams of 5 & 1 team of 4	Green Team	Natalie, Tony, Zach	Kam	**Britni**	Cara Maria	Jemmye	Yankin' My Chain	Nelson	Darrell (Note: In episode 11, the elimination between Nelson and the Mercenary, Darrell, came to a draw after they reached the time limit. Thus Nelson was allowed back into the game, but was not rewarded a Grenade.)
11	This Land Is My Land	—N/a	2 teams of 5 & 1 team of 4	Green Team	Natalie, Tony, Zach	Kam	**Britni**	Cara Maria	Jemmye	Yankin' My Chain	Laurel	Britni
12	Spanish Treasure	Female	1 team of 7 & 1 team of 6	Team 1	Brad, Tony, Zach	Kam	Cara Maria	Kailah	**Natalie**	Spanish Torture	Kam	Natalie
12/13	Help Me, Rhonda	—N/a	Individual	Zach	—N/a							Jemmye
12/13	Help Me, Rhonda	—N/a	Individual	Nicole Z	—N/a							Devin
13	Outside the Box	Male	Individual	Kailah	Tony, Kailah, Cara Maria	—N/a						Nelson
13	Outside the Box	Male	Individual	Tony	Tony, Kailah, Cara Maria	—N/a	**Brad**	Kyle	**Leroy**	Head Banger	Leroy	Brad
14	Final Challenge	—N/a	Individual	—N/a								Nicole Z
14	Final Challenge	—N/a	Individual	—N/a								Kam
14	Final Challenge	—N/a	Individual	—N/a								Leroy
14	Final Challenge	—N/a	Individual	—N/a								Tony
14	Final Challenge	—N/a	Individual	Cara Maria	2nd: Zach; 3rd: Kyle; 4th: Kailah							

=== Elimination progress ===
Contestants	Episodes												
Contestants	1	2/3	3/4	4/5	6/7	7/8	8/9	9/10	11	12	12/13	13	Finale
Cara Maria	SAFE	SAFE	SAFE	SAFE	SAFE	WON	SAVE	SAFE	NOM	NOM	SAFE	HIGH	WINNER
Zach	SAFE	SAFE	SAFE	WIN	WON	SAFE	SAFE	WIN	WIN	WIN	WON	SAFE	SECOND
Kyle	SAFE	HIGH	SAFE	SAFE	WIN	WIN	SAFE	WON	NOM	SAFE	SAFE	NOM	THIRD
Kailah	SAFE	SAFE	SAFE	SAFE	WON	SAFE	ELIM	WIN	SAFE	NOM	SAFE	WIN	FOURTH
Kam	SAFE	SAFE	NOM	SAFE	SAFE	ELIM	SAFE	WON	ELIM	ELIM	SAFE	SAFE	PURGED
Leroy	SAFE	SAFE	SAFE	SAFE	SAFE	SAFE	SAFE	NOM	NOM	SAFE	SAFE	ELIM	PURGED
Tony	SAFE	NOM	SAFE	WIN	WIN	WIN	SAFE	WIN	WIN	WIN	SAFE	WIN	PURGED
Nicole Z.	SAFE	SAFE	SAFE	SAFE	SAFE	WIN	NOM	WON	WON	WON	WON	SAFE	MED
Brad	SAFE	HIGH	SAFE	SAFE	ELIM	WON	SAFE	WON	ELIM	WIN	SAFE	OUT	
Nelson	SAFE	ELIM	SAFE	SAFE	SAFE	NOM	WIN	NOM	DRAW	SAFE	SAFE	LAST	
Devin	SAFE	SAFE	WIN	SAFE	NOM	NOM	SAFE	ELIM	SAFE	WON	LAST		
Jemmye	SAFE	SAFE	SAFE	SAFE	SAFE	WON	SAFE	SAFE	NOM	WON	LAST		
Natalie	SAFE	SAFE	WIN	SAFE	—N/a	SAVE	WIN	WON	WIN	LOST			
Britni	SAFE	WON	SAFE	NOM	SAFE	SAFE	SAFE	SAFE	LOST				
Kayleigh	SAFE	SAFE	NOM	NOM	SAFE	SAVE	SAFE	QUIT					
Bananas	SAFE	WIN	HIGH	SAFE	WIN	WON	WIN	OUT					
Marie	SAFE	SAFE	SAFE	WIN	SAFE	SAFE	OUT						
Joss	WON	SAFE	SAFE	SAFE	SAFE	OUT							
Veronica	SAFE	SAFE	SAFE	SAFE	SAFE	MED							
Shane	SAFE	SAFE	SAFE	SAFE	NOM	LOST							
Sylvia	SAFE	SAFE	SAFE	ELIM	—N/a	MED							
Victor	SAFE	NOM	SAFE	SAFE	OUT								
Melissa	SAFE	SAFE	ELIM	OUT									
Alicia	SAFE	SAFE	OUT										
Cory	SAFE	OUT											
Eddie	SAFE	LEFT											
Nicole R.	LAST												
Rogan	LAST												

Competition
The contestant won the final challenge
The contestant did not win the final challenge
The contestant finished in the bottom 4, after being eliminated on the first leg of the final challenge
The contestant won the challenge and was part of the Troika
The contestant did not win the challenge but placed in the Top 3 and was part of the Troika
The contestant won the challenge, but was not part of the Troika or nominated for the Inquisition
The contestant won the challenge and was nominated by the Troika for the Inquisition, but was not selected for the elimination round
The contestant was not selected for the elimination round
The contestant was nominated by the Troika for the Inquisition, but was not selected for the elimination round
The contestant won the Ring
The contestant's elimination in the Ring was deemed a draw, but they were not eliminated
The contestant lost the Ring and was eliminated
The contestant won the challenge, but was selected for the Ring, lost and was eliminated
The contestant was eliminated at the challenge
The contestant was removed from the competition due to medical reasons
The contestant withdrew from the competition
The contestant left the competition for undisclosed reasons

=== Bank progress ===
Players	Episodes												
Players	1	2/3	3/4	4/5	6/7	7/8	8/9	9/10	11	12	12/13	13	Finale
Cara Maria	$0	$0	$0	$0	$0	$2,500	$8,750	$8,750	$8,750	$8,750	$8,750	$8,750	**$378,750**
Zach	$0	$0	$0	$8,000	$13,000	$13,000	$13,000	$16,125	$21,125	$24,625	$37,125	$37,125	**$72,125**
Kyle	$0	$0	$0	$0	$5,000	$7,500	$7,500	$10,625	$10,625	$10,625	$10,625	$10,625	**$20,625**
Kailah	$0	$0	$0	$0	$5,000	$5,000	$5,000	$8,125	$8,125	$8,125	$8,125	$20,625	**$25,625**
Kam	$0	$0	$0	$0	$0	$0	$0	$3,125	$3,125	$3,125	$19,125	$19,125	$19,125
Leroy	$0	$0	$0	$0	$0	$0	$0	$0	$0	$0	$0	$0	$0
Tony	$0	$0	$0	$8,000	$13,000	$15,500	$15,500	$18,625	$23,625	$27,125	$27,125	$39,625	$39,625
Nicole Z.	$0	$0	$0	$0	$0	$2,500	$2,500	$5,625	$10,625	$14,125	$26,625	$26,625	$26,625
Brad	$0	$0	$0	$0	$0	$2,500	$2,500	$5,625	$5,625	$9,125	$9,125	$9,125	
Nelson	$0	$0	$5,000	$5,000	$5,000	$5,000	$11,250	$11,250	$11,250	$11,250	$11,250	$11,250	
Devin	$0	$0	$12,500	$12,500	$12,500	$12,500	$12,500	$12,500	$12,500	$16,000	$0		
Jemmye	$0	$0	$0	$0	$0	$2,500	$2,500	$2,500	$2,500	$6,000	$6,000		
Natalie	$0	$0	$12,500	$12,500	$12,500	$15,000	$21,250	$24,375	$29,375	$32,875			
Britni	$0	$12,500	$12,500	$12,500	$12,500	$12,500	$12,500	$12,500	$17,500				
Kayleigh	$0	$0	$0	$0	$0	$2,500	$2,500	$2,500					
Bananas	$0	$12,500	$12,500	$12,500	$17,500	$20,000	$26,250	$26,250					
Marie	$0	$0	$0	$8,000	$8,000	$8,000	$8,000						
Joss	$25,000	$25,000	$20,000	$20,000	$20,000	$20,000							
Veronica	$0	$0	$0	$0	$0	$0							
Shane	$0	$0	$0	$0	$0	$2,500							
Sylvia	$0	$0	$0	$0	$0	$0							
Victor	$0	$0	$0	$0	$0								
Melissa	$0	$0	$0	$0									
Alicia	$0	$0	$0										
Cory	$0	$0											
Eddie	$0	$0											
Nicole R.	$0												
Rogan	$0												

- Note: Dollar amounts in **bold** indicate that contestant finished in the Top 4 with that amount, and won it in the final challenge.
- Note: Dollar amounts in italics indicate that contestant was eliminated with that amount, and lost it upon elimination. The total amount was added to the Additional Bank, which was given to the winner.

Additional Bank: $220,000 (Note: The additional bank account of eliminated players' money was $221,375. However, for the final prize money, it was rounded down to $220,000.)

== Voting progress ==
Last-place	**Nelson** last-place	**Melissa** last-place	**Sylvia**; 2 of 3 votes	**Brad**; 4 of 5 votes	**Joss**; 7 of 10 votes	**Veronica**; 6 of 10 votes	**Marie**; 3 of 4 votes	**Devin**; 5 of 8 votes	**Brad**; 4 of 5 votes	**Kam**; 4 of 5 votes	Tie Vote	**Kam**; 3 of 3 votes	—N/a	**Brad**; 0 of 3 votes to save	**Leroy**; 1 of 3 votes to save
Troika Pick	**Cory**; 3 of 3 votes	**Alicia**; 3 of 3 votes	**Melissa**; 3 of 3 votes	**Victor**; 3 of 3 votes	**Shane**; 3 of 3 votes	**Kam**; 3 of 3 votes	**Kailah**; 2 of 3 votes	**Bananas**; 2 of 3 votes	**Nelson**; 3 of 3 votes	**Britni**; 3 of 3 votes	Tie Vote	**Kam**; 3 of 3 votes	**Natalie**; 3 of 3 votes	**Brad**; 0 of 3 votes to save	**Leroy**; 1 of 3 votes to save
Voter	Episode														
Voter	2/3	3/4	4/5	6/7	7/8		8/9	9/10	11		12			13	
Cara Maria								Devin			Kailah	Kailah		**Kyle**	
Zach			**Melissa**		Joss	Veronica		**Nelson**	**Nelson**	**Britni**		**Kam**	**Natalie**		
Kyle	**Cory**			**Victor**	**Shane**	**Kam**					Kailah	Kailah			
Kailah					Joss	Veronica		**Bananas**	Brad	Kam	Cara Maria	Cara Maria		**Leroy**	
Kam				Brad	Joss	Veronica	Marie		Brad	Kailah	Cara Maria	Cara Maria			
Leroy					Joss	Kailah		Devin			Kailah	Kailah			
Tony			**Melissa**	**Victor**	**Shane**	**Kam**		**Bananas**	**Nelson**	**Britni**		**Kam**	**Natalie**	**Kyle**	
Nicole Z.					**Shane**	**Kam**									
Brad	**Cory**		Sylvia	Nelson			Marie		Nelson	Kam		**Kam**	**Natalie**		
Nelson				Brad	Leroy	Marie	**Cara Maria**	Bananas	Brad	Kam	Cara Maria	Cara Maria			
Devin		**Alicia**			Leroy	Veronica		Bananas	Brad	Kam					
Jemmye							Marie	Devin							
Natalie		**Alicia**					**Kailah**		**Nelson**	**Britni**					
Britni					Joss	Kam		Bananas							
Kayleigh				Brad				Devin							
Bananas	**Cory**	**Alicia**		**Victor**			**Kailah**	Devin							
Marie			**Melissa**	Brad	Joss	Veronica	Jemmye								
Joss			Sylvia		Leroy	Veronica									
Veronica					Joss	Kam									
Shane															
Sylvia			Brad												
Victor															
Melissa															
Alicia															
Cory															
Eddie															
Nicole R.															
Rogan															

- **Bold** indicates the contestant was in the Troika

== Team selections ==
Contestant	Episodes												
Contestant	1	2/3	3/4	4/5	6/7	7/8	8/9	9/10	11	12	12/13	13	14
Cara Maria	Individual			Team 3	Team 2	Green Team	Team 1	Green Team	Blue Team	Team 2	Individual		
Zach	Individual			Team 6	Team 4	Blue Team	Team 2	Blue Team	Green Team	Team 1	Individual		
Kyle	Individual			Team 2	Team 4	Green Team	Team 4	Blue Team	Blue Team	Team 2	Individual		
Kailah	Individual			Team 8	Team 4	Blue Team	Team 2	Blue Team	Red Team	Team 2	Individual		
Kam	Individual			Team 7	Team 1	Blue Team	Team 3	Blue Team	Red Team	Team 2	Individual		
Leroy	Individual			Team 2	Team 3	Blue Team	Team 4	Green Team	Blue Team	Team 2	Individual		
Tony	Individual			Team 6	Team 4	Green Team	Team 2	Blue Team	Green Team	Team 1	Individual		
Nicole Z.	Individual			Team 5	Team 3	Green Team	Team 2	Blue Team	Green Team	Team 1	Individual		
Brad	Individual			Team 4	Team 1	Green Team	Team 3	Blue Team	Red Team	Team 1	Individual		
Nelson	Individual			Team 7	Team 1	Blue Team	Team 1	Green Team	Red Team	Team 2	Individual		
Devin	Individual			Team 1	Team 3	Blue Team	Team 4	Green Team	Red Team	Team 1	Individual		
Jemmye	Individual			Team 5	Team 3	Green Team	Team 3	Green Team	Blue Team	Team 1	Individual		
Natalie	Individual			Team 7	—N/a	Green Team	Team 1	Blue Team	Green Team	Team 1			
Britni	Individual			Team 2	Team 2	Blue Team	Team 4	Green Team	Green Team				
Kayleigh	Individual			Team 3	Team 1	Green Team	Team 4	Green Team					
Bananas	Individual			Team 3	Team 4	Green Team	Team 1	Green Team					
Marie	Individual			Team 6	Team 1	Blue Team	Team 3						
Joss	Individual			Team 4	Team 2	Blue Team							
Veronica	Individual			Team 5	Team 2	Blue Team							
Shane	Individual			Team 1	Team 3	Green Team							
Sylvia	Individual			Team 4	—N/a								
Victor	Individual			Team 8	Team 2								
Melissa	Individual			Team 1									
Alicia	Individual												
Cory	Individual												
Eddie	Individual												
Nicole R.	Individual												
Rogan	Individual												

== Grenades ==
Ring game	Winner(s)	Grenades	Choice	Victim(s)
Balls of Fire	Nelson	Cash (Take $5,000 from any player who has money.)	✓	Joss
Balls of Fire	Nelson	Time Crunch (Add time to another player's challenge performance.)	✗	Joss
Balls of Fire	Nelson	Put Up or Shut Up (Join the Troika or send a player straight into the Inquisition.)	✗	Joss
Chain Reaction	Melissa	Team Up (Pick the teams for the next challenge.)	✓	—N/a
Chain Reaction	Melissa	Money Hungry (Choose one player to drink 1 liter of cream before the next challenge.)	✗	—N/a
Chain Reaction	Melissa	Sit Out (Choose any player to sit out of the next challenge and automatically get sent into elimination.)	✗	—N/a
Oil and Water	Sylvia	Cash (Take $10,000 from any player who has money.)	—N/a	—N/a
Oil and Water	Sylvia	Endure (Choose any player to perform an endurance task before the next challenge.)	—N/a	—N/a
Oil and Water	Sylvia	Order Up (Choose the order for the next challenge.)	—N/a	—N/a
Troubled Water	Brad	Time Crunch (Add time to another player's challenge performance.)	✓	Kam
Troubled Water	Brad	Sit Out (Choose any player to sit out of the next challenge.)	✗	Kam
Troubled Water	Brad	Blindside (Somebody has to compete in the next challenge blindfolded.)	✗	Kam
Crazy 8	Kam	Lube Up (Lube up any player at the next challenge.)	✓	Cara Maria
Crazy 8	Kam	Endure (Choose any player to perform an endurance task before the next challenge.)	✗	Cara Maria
Crazy 8	Kam	Flip Out (Choose any player to wear flippers at the next challenge.)	✗	Cara Maria
Basket Case	Kailah	Cash Up (Take any player's money.)	✗	—N/a
Basket Case	Kailah	Team Up (Pick the teams for the next challenge.)	✓	—N/a
Basket Case	Kailah	Put Up or Shut Up (Pick any player that has to win a spot into the Troika or face the Inquisition.)	✗	—N/a
Not So Bright	Devin	Weighted Down (Add weight to any player for the next challenge.)	✗	—N/a
Not So Bright	Devin	Tied Up (Tie up any player's ankles for the next challenge.)	✗	—N/a
Not So Bright	Devin	Team Up (Pick the teams for the challenge.)	✓	—N/a
Yanking My Chain	—N/a	Cash (Take any player's money.)	✗	—N/a
Yanking My Chain	Brad	Tied Up (Tie up any player's ankles for the next challenge.)	✓	Kyle
Yanking My Chain	Kam	Time Up (Add time to another player's challenge performance.)	✓	Cara Maria
Spanish Torture	Kam	Cash (Take any player's money.)	✓	Devin
Spanish Torture	Kam	Endurance (Force a player to do 30 burpees before for the next challenge.)	✗	Devin
Spanish Torture	Kam	Time Crunch (Add time to another player's challenge performance.)	✗	Devin
Decked Out
Station	Dealers	Grenades	Choice	Victim(s)
Higher or Lower	Melissa	Bury a Log (Force a player to bury a log.)	✓	Kam
Higher or Lower	Melissa	Do 50 Jumping Jacks (Force a player to do 50 jumping jacks.)	✗	Kam
Higher or Lower	Melissa	Enjoy a Glass of Water (Force a player to drink an entire glass of water.)	✗	Kam

== Episodes ==
No. overall	No. in season	Title	Original release date	US viewers (millions)
388	1	"When Worlds Collide"	January 2, 2018	0.89
389	2	"The Power of Three"	January 9, 2018	0.87
390	3	"#banatalie"	January 16, 2018	1.02
391	4	"Pizzagate"	January 23, 2018	0.74
392	5	"Guilty by Association"	January 30, 2018	0.92
393	6	"Notes on a Scandal"	February 6, 2018	0.82
394	7	"Pulling the Strings"	February 13, 2018	0.83
395	8	"Mercenaries of Mayhem"	February 20, 2018	0.88
396	9	"Baskets of Deplorables"	February 27, 2018	0.84
397	10	"Rumor Has It"	March 6, 2018	0.77
398	11	"It's Britni, B..."	March 13, 2018	0.83
399	12	"Help Me, Rhonda"	March 20, 2018	0.75
400	13	"Czechmate"	March 27, 2018	0.83
401	14	"Vendettas Never Die"	April 3, 2018	0.90

=== Reunion special ===
The two-part reunion special/finale aired on April 10 and 17, 2018, and was hosted by WWE pro wrestler, The Real World: Back to New York alum, and Challenge champion Mike "The Miz" Mizanin. Cast members (including Kayleigh, Melissa and Kyle via Satellite) attended at the MTV Studios in New York City.
