= The Challenge: USA season 2 =

2nd season of the reality television series

The Challenge: USA
- Season 2
- Presented by: T. J. Lavin
- No. of contestants: 24
- Winners: Chris Underwood; Desi Williams
- Location: Pula, Croatia
- No. of episodes: 14

Release
- Original network: CBS
- Original release: August 10 – October 19, 2023

Season chronology
- ← Previous; Season 1

The second season of The Challenge: USA premiered on CBS on August 10, 2023, with next-day uncensored episodes on Paramount+. The season features eighteen CBS cast members from Survivor, The Amazing Race and Big Brother competing for $500,000. Unlike the first season which only featured alumni from CBS reality shows who have never appeared on The Challenge, the season expanded casting to also include six veterans of The Challenge whose original shows were on MTV as well as CBS alumni who had also previously competed on The Challenge.

== Format ==
The second season of The Challenge: USA features a daily challenge, a nomination process and an elimination round. This season initially had contestants competing in three teams decided during the first episode. The format is as follows:

- Daily Challenge: Teams compete in a main challenge. The winning team is immune from elimination and earns the power to nominate one male and one female contestant to potentially compete in the elimination round.
- Nominations: Members of both losing teams privately vote for one contestant, of either gender, to potentially compete in the elimination round. This voting acts as a random ballot, with a ball being added to the Hopper for each vote a contestant receives, increasing their probability of being selected to compete in the elimination round.
- Eliminations (The Arena): At the Arena, the Hopper randomly selects one contestant who received votes to compete in the elimination round. The same-gender player nominated by the challenge winners then becomes their opponent for elimination. The winner remains in the game while the loser is eliminated.

At the end of Episode 7, teams were disbanded and the game changed to an individual format, with challenge winners limited to only the top performing male and female contestant.

Twists

- The Hopper: The Hopper is a lottery machine which randomly selects a ball with the name of the contestant to compete in the Arena.
- Defection: During the team format, the winners of elimination rounds may choose to remain on their current team or "defect" and join another team. If they choose to defect, they must select a player of the same gender from their desired team to swap positions with.
- Double Elimination: Episodes 4, 10 and 13 featured double eliminations where one male and one female contestant were eliminated. Both contestants nominated by the challenge winners were guaranteed to compete in the Arena. The voting contestants vote for one player of each gender, with the Hopper selecting one contestant of each gender to compete in the Arena.

== Contestants ==
| Male contestants | Original season | Finish |
|---|---|---|
| Chris Underwood | Survivor: Edge of Extinction | Winner |
| Cory Wharton | Real World: Ex-Plosion | Runner-up |
| Johnny "Bananas" Devenanzio | The Real World: Key West | Third place |
| Faysal Shafaat | Big Brother 20 | Fourth place |
| Josh Martinez | Big Brother 19 | Episode 13 |
| Tyler Crispen | Big Brother 20 | Episode 11 |
| Wes Bergmann | The Real World: Austin | Episode 10 |
| Sebastian Noel | Survivor: Ghost Island | Episode 9 |
| Monte Taylor | Big Brother 24 | Episode 8 |
| Dusty Harris | The Amazing Race 33 | Episode 6 |
| Luis Colón | The Amazing Race 34 | Episode 4 |
| Paulie Calafiore | Big Brother 18 | Episode 3 |

| Female contestants | Original season | Finish |
|---|---|---|
| Desi Williams | Survivor: Heroes vs. Healers vs. Hustlers | Winner |
| Chanelle Howell | Survivor 42 | Runner-up |
| Michaela Bradshaw | Survivor: Millennials vs. Gen X | Third place (Note: Michaela was medically disqualified during day two of the Final Challenge due to dehydration.) |
| Tori Deal | Are You the One? 4 | Fourth place |
| Cassidy Clark | Survivor 43 | Episode 13 |
| Michele Fitzgerald | Survivor: Kaôh Rōng | Episode 12 |
| Alyssa Snider | Big Brother 24 | Episode 10 |
| Tiffany Mitchell | Big Brother 23 | Episode 7 |
| Alyssa Lopez | Big Brother 23 | Episode 5 |
| Amanda Garcia | Are You the One? 3 | Episode 4 |
| Jonna Mannion | The Real World: Cancun | Episode 2 |
| Ameerah Jones | Big Brother 24 | Episode 1/2 |

=== Draft ===
At the start of the season, three captains were randomly selected from the CBS reality players to draft the contestants into three teams of eight. Each team consisted of two Challenge veterans and six CBS reality players, with an even gender split. Italicized names indicate players who were placed on a team by default.

| Round | Red Team | Blue Team | Green Team |
|---|---|---|---|
| Captain | Josh | Cassidy | Desi |
| 1 | Jonna | Cory | Wes |
| 2 | Paulie | Tori | Michaela |
| 3 | Michele | Faysal | Monte |
| 4 | Dusty | Alyssa L. | Ameerah |
| 5 | Chanelle | Sebastian | Tyler |
| 6 | Bananas | Alyssa S. | Amanda |
| 7 | Tiffany | Chris | Luis |

== Gameplay ==
=== Challenge games ===
- Storm the Castle: Teams must transport two heavy statues uphill to the ruins of a castle, memorizing rune symbols and completing two checkpoints along the way. Both checkpoints require teams to identify three symbols which were not displayed to obtain the codes to unlock a wagon to use, and offload each statue's base, respectively. The first team to bring both statues to the castle ruins wins.
  - Winners: Blue Team
- Working the Poles: Played in two heats of four members from each team. Team members begin on a platform above water and must traverse several hanging poles to reach their team platform at the opposite end, with all three team's paths intersecting. Team members are eliminated from the challenge if they fall into the water. The team with the most players to reach their platform in the fastest time wins.
  - Winners: Green Team
- Capsized: Teams must swim to a boat and overturn it to view and memorize an answer key of 20 flags on the underside. Team members then swim to eight buoys to collect flags submerged underneath before hanging them to recreate the answer key on the boat's topside, and each team member must swim to at least one buoy. Once complete, teams swim back to the starting dock to have their time stopped. The team with the most correctly hung flags in the fastest time wins.
  - Winners: Blue Team
- Sideswiped: Played in six heats. Each heat, two team members from two teams begin harnessed between two trucks – one assigned to each team. As the trucks speed down a runway, team members have five minutes to swing past their opponents and stick as many of their eight disks as possible on specified areas of their team's truck while their opponents try to block them and do the same. The team with the most total disks attached to their truck and the end of the challenge wins.
  - Winners: Red Team
- Unboxed: Each team member must carry a box proportional to their bodyweight to the end of a trail. Along the way are five puzzle stations where teams may choose to spend time using the puzzle pieces in one team member's box to solve a puzzle, which allows them to leave the box behind for the remainder of the challenge. Except for the first station, only one team may solve the puzzle at each station. The first team to reach the end of the trail wins.
  - Winners: Green Team
- High-Q: Teams begin on a platform above water. Each round, teams are asked a trivia question and their platform inclines slightly if they answer incorrectly, making it more difficult to stay on. Team members are eliminated from the challenge if they fall into the water. The last team standing wins.
  - Winners: Blue Team
- Wreck & Roll: Two team members begin inside a giant sphere. They must roll around a course and knock down eight of their team's columns to release lettered tyres placed on top of each column. The remaining team members must collect the tyres and arrange them on a grid to solve a word puzzle. The first team to solve the puzzle wins.
  - Winners: Blue Team
- Spell-Lunkers: Played in four heats. Players swim to a buoy and dive to view a word puzzle submerged underneath. They must find the theme of the words hidden in the puzzle and use it to open a lockbox containing a flashlight. With the flashlight, players must then swim through a dark cave to a second word puzzle, solve the theme of the words and use it to unlock a second lockbox. The male and female player with the fastest time wins.
  - Winners: Bananas & Tori
- Speed Jumps: Played in two stages. In Stage One, players jump on a trampoline adjusted for their height to view a board of numbers behind a tall wall. They must sum the numbers together and present their answer to host T.J. Lavin. The first three male and female players to answer correctly progress to Stage Two. In Stage Two, players jump on a trampoline located on the back of a semi-trailer as it speeds down a runway. They must collect overhead flags along the runway, with green, yellow, and red flags worth one, two, and three points, respectively. The male and female player with the most points wins.
  - Winners: Faysal & Tori
- Go the Distance: Played in male and female heats. Each round, players jump off a platform into the water of the Punta Christo Quarry and attempt to grab a hanging baton (adjusted for their armspan and height) to advance to the next round. After each round, the batons are moved further away, and players are eliminated from the challenge if they are unable to grab their baton. The last male and female player standing wins.
  - Winners: Faysal & Michaela
- Slippery Business: Played in male and female rounds. Players begin in a ring, covered in oil, and attempt to push their opponents out of the ring. The last player standing in each round wins.
  - Winners: Cory & Michaela
- Brain Squeeze: Players must search the Punta Christo Fort for all their assigned bags of puzzle pieces, without being told that there are eight bags, and bring them to their puzzle station outside the fort. After collecting all their puzzle pieces, the first male and female player to assemble the puzzle wins.
  - Winners: Chris & Desi
- Burst Your Bubble: Played two players at a time, players must climb up a 40-foot rope ladder to the basket of a hot air balloon then cross a narrow balance beam to reach a second hot air balloon. The male and female player with the fastest time wins.
  - Winners: Chris & Michaela

=== Arena games ===
- Slam Dunked: Players begin harnessed over a water tank filled with 1,500 balls. Throughout the elimination, they must remove as many balls as possible from the tank, while continuously being lifted out of and lowered into the tank 15 times. The player with the most balls removed at the end of the 15 dunks wins.
  - Played by: Ameerah vs. Michele
- Drop the Ball: Players attempt to catch balls dropping from a large pinball-like machine and deposit it into their goal to earn points, while their opponent tries to block them and do the same. Black balls are worth one point while silver balls are worth three points, and balls are considered out of play once they hit the ground. The player with the most points after all 60 balls are released wins.
  - Played by: Jonna vs. Tori
- Fire & Ice: Players begin standing on a block of ice with one arm raised above their head and connected to a bucket of fish guts which spills if they move/lower that arm. Throughout the elimination, they can throw beanbags at a target to ignite a flame underneath their opponent's ice block, making it more difficult for them to keep their arm raised as the ice melts, while also turning off the flame under their own ice block. The last player standing wins.
  - Played by: Bananas vs. Paulie
- Evil Eye: Players begin in the center of the Arena with both hands on a large evil eye disk. The first player to wrestle the disk out of their opponent's hands and bring it outside the boundary of the Arena twice wins.
  - Played by: Chris vs. Luis, Amanda vs. Desi
- Block Heads: Each player begins locked in a geometric-shaped cage and must roll the cage to four flagpoles and collect the attached flags. After collecting all four flags, players place them on a lightbox to reveal a code which they use to unlock the cage and escape. The first player to escape their cage and push a button at the boundary of the Arena wins.
  - Played by: Alyssa L. vs. Cassidy
- Crank Shafted: One player attempts to balance on a wheel for as long as possible. Their opponent can untie up to three steering wheels, attach them to a crankshaft and use them to spin the wheel to make it harder to balance on. Attaching more steering wheels to the crankshaft makes it easier to spin, however players risk losing time untying them. Once the player on the wheel falls off, players switch positions and repeat this process. The player who balances on the wheel for the longest time during their turn wins.
  - Played by: Dusty vs. Wes
- Top Heavy: Each player begins harnessed to a beam at the center of the Arena. They must generate momentum to swing the beam back and forth so they can collect balls at one end of the Arena and throw them into a basket at the other end. The first player to land ten baskets wins.
  - Played by: Michaela vs. Tiffany
- Too Cool For Spool: Players begin harnessed to a giant spool at the center of the Arena, which spins as they move towards and away from it. They must collect balls at the boundary of the Arena and use them to assemble a five-layer pyramid on top of the spool. The first player to assemble their pyramid wins.
  - Played by: Monte vs. Tyler
- Trick, Trick, Boom: Players line up three barrels with flat panels mounted on them, then perform a trick shot by throwing a ball to have it bounce on each panel before landing in a barrel at the end. After landing their first trick shot, players must then add two additional barrels, with slanted panels, to their setup and throw a second trick shot. The first player to land both trick shots wins.
  - Played by: Chris vs. Sebastian
- Ripped Off: Players begin harnessed to the side of a cylindrical tower, with one player designated as the "chaser" and the other as the "runner", who wears a jumpsuit with ten patches attached to them. The chaser attempts to rip off as many patches from the runner's jumpsuit as possible in five minutes while the runner tries to prevent them from doing so. Afterwards, players switch roles and repeat this process. The player who rips the most patches off their opponent during their turn as chaser wins.
  - Played by: Alyssa S. vs Cassidy, Chris vs. Wes
- Barrel Tag: Starting on opposite ends of the Arena, one player begins as "it" and must use two barrels to move around the Arena without touching the ground and tag their opponent, while their opponent tries to avoid them using the same method. Once the player who is "it" tags their opponent, players switch roles and repeat this process. The player who tags their opponent the fastest during their turn as "it" wins.
  - Played by: Chris vs. Tyler
- Hot Wheel: Players begin on opposite sides of a bar which has a torch connected to the center and steering wheels attached to each end. They must spin the wheels to attempt to maneuver the torch to light their six assigned targets while their opponent tries to do the same. The first player to light all their targets wins.
  - Played by: Cassidy vs. Michele
- Hall Brawl: Holding a kick shield for the initial impact, players must run through a narrow hallway past their opponent and solve a puzzle at the opposite end. The first player to solve the puzzle wins.
  - Played by: Cassidy vs. Chanelle, Faysal vs. Josh

=== Final Challenge ===
The final eight contestants competed in the Final Challenge, which began the day after the "Hall Brawl" elimination.

Day one

For the first day, players compete in four trials based on traits "needed" to become a champion. The winning male and female player of each trial earn a one-minute advantage for day two, while the respective last-place male and female player incur a one-minute penalty. For a trial, players can also "double down" and call that they will win that trial. This doubles their advantage to two minutes if they win the trial, but also doubles their penalty to two minutes if they place last. Afterwards, players had to participate in an Overnight Stage challenge which went unaired in the episode.

- Trial 1 (Strength): Players must use a sled to haul four boxes proportional to their bodyweight up a hill.
- Trial 2 (Smarts): Players compete in a five-word spelling bee.
- Trial 3 (Skills): Players must arrange tiles into a grid, so that four squares of the same color cannot be in a row.
- Trial 4 (Steel Stomach): Players must consume three out of four dishes from the choices of: a tofu and sauerkraut smoothie; a chia stack topped with mealworms and crickets; wasabi crackers; and loaded chilli truffles.
- Overnight Stage: Players spend the night at a campsite and collectively complete an unaired overnight challenge before they can sleep. Players must stand on narrow pedestals for one hour, counting the time themselves, before stepping off. They must restart if they step off before one hour, or after one hour and five minutes.

Day two

Players complete a ten-mile race to the finish line at the top of a mountain, departing based on the time advantages or penalties earned during the previous day. Along the way are three "Risk Stations". Players can choose to spend time attempting the challenges at the first two Risk Stations to earn an advantage, while the third Risk Station is mandatory to complete. Additionally, the last male and female player to reach the second Risk Station are eliminated from the Final Challenge.

- Risk Station 1: Players can attempt to throw an axe and hit a target within five throws to access a 1.2-mile shortcut to the next station. From this station, all players must carry a heavy rock to the next station.
- Risk Station 2: Players can attempt to place rocks in one side of a scale so that it balances out the other side, within one try. If they are successful, they can ride an ATV one mile to the next Risk Station. The last male and female player to arrive at Risk Station 2 are eliminated.
  - Eliminated: Faysal (Note: Faysal initially arrived at Risk Station 2 second; however, he was required to backtrack and run a one-mile penalty lap for taking the shortcut when he had not completed Risk Station 1. Bananas and Cory reached the station during this time, eliminating Faysal from the Final Challenge.) and Tori (4th place)
- Risk Station 3: Players must stack cinder blocks with the names of eliminated contestants in the order they were eliminated before proceeding to the finish line. The first male and female player to reach the finish line are declared the winners of the season and receive $250,000 each.
  - Winners: Chris and Desi ($250,000 each)
  - Runners-up: Chanelle and Cory
  - Third place: Bananas and Michaela

== Game summary ==
| Episode | | Winners | Arena contestants | | Arena game | Arena outcome | | | |
| No. | Challenge | Winners | Winners' picks | Hopper pick | Arena game | Winner | Eliminated | Defected | Swapped |
|---|---|---|---|---|---|---|---|---|---|
| 1/2 | Storm the Castle | Blue Team | Ameerah | Michele | Slam Dunked | Michele | Ameerah | No | —N/a |
| 1/2 | Storm the Castle | Blue Team | Luis | Michele | Slam Dunked | Michele | Ameerah | No | —N/a |
| 2 | Working the Poles | Green Team | Bananas | Jonna | Drop the Ball | Tori | Jonna | No | —N/a |
| 2 | Working the Poles | Green Team | Tori | Jonna | Drop the Ball | Tori | Jonna | No | —N/a |
| 3 | Capsized | Blue Team | Amanda | Paulie | Fire & Ice | Bananas | Paulie | Yes | Cory |
| 3 | Capsized | Blue Team | Bananas | Paulie | Fire & Ice | Bananas | Paulie | Yes | Cory |
| 4 | Sideswiped | Red Team | Luis | Chris | Evil Eye | Chris | Luis | No | —N/a |
| 4 | Sideswiped | Red Team | Desi | Amanda | Evil Eye | Desi | Amanda | Yes | Alyssa S. |
| 5 | Unboxed | Green Team | Cassidy | Alyssa L. | Block Heads | Cassidy | Alyssa L. | No | —N/a |
| 5 | Unboxed | Green Team | Chris | Alyssa L. | Block Heads | Cassidy | Alyssa L. | No | —N/a |
| 6 | High-Q | Blue Team | Tiffany | Dusty | Crank Shafted | Wes | Dusty | Yes | Chris |
| 6 | High-Q | Blue Team | Wes | Dusty | Crank Shafted | Wes | Dusty | Yes | Chris |
| 7 | Wreck & Roll | Blue Team | Michaela | Tiffany | Top Heavy | Michaela | Tiffany | —N/a | |
| 7 | Wreck & Roll | Blue Team | Tyler | Tiffany | Top Heavy | Michaela | Tiffany | —N/a | |
| 8 | Spell-Lunkers | Bananas | Alyssa S. | Monte | Too Cool For Spool | Tyler | Monte | —N/a | |
| 8 | Spell-Lunkers | Tori | Tyler | Monte | Too Cool For Spool | Tyler | Monte | —N/a | |
| 9 | Speed Jumps | Faysal | Cassidy | Sebastian | Trick, Trick, Boom | Chris | Sebastian | —N/a | |
| 9 | Speed Jumps | Tori | Chris | Sebastian | Trick, Trick, Boom | Chris | Sebastian | —N/a | |
| 10 | Go the Distance | Faysal | Alyssa S. | Cassidy | Ripped Off | Cassidy | Alyssa S. | —N/a | |
| 10 | Go the Distance | Michaela | Chris | Wes | Ripped Off | Chris | Wes | —N/a | |
| 11 | Slippery Business | Cory | Cassidy | Chris | Barrel Tag | Chris | Tyler | —N/a | |
| 11 | Slippery Business | Michaela | Tyler | Chris | Barrel Tag | Chris | Tyler | —N/a | |
| 12 | Brain Squeeze | Chris | Josh | Cassidy | Hot Wheel | Cassidy | Michele | —N/a | |
| 12 | Brain Squeeze | Desi | Michele | Cassidy | Hot Wheel | Cassidy | Michele | —N/a | |
| 13 | Burst Your Bubble | Chris | Cassidy | Chanelle | Hall Brawl | Chanelle | Cassidy | —N/a | |
| 13 | Burst Your Bubble | Michaela | Faysal | Josh | Hall Brawl | Faysal | Josh | —N/a | |
| 14 | Final Challenge | Chris | 2nd: Cory; 3rd: Bananas; 4th: Faysal | | | | | | |
| 14 | Final Challenge | Desi | 2nd: Chanelle; 3rd: Michaela; 4th: Tori | | | | | | |

=== Episode progress ===
| Contestants | Episodes | | | | | | | | | | | | | |
| Contestants | 1/2 | 2 | 3 | 4 | 5 | 6 | 7 | 8 | 9 | 10 | 11 | 12 | 13 | Finale |
|---|---|---|---|---|---|---|---|---|---|---|---|---|---|---|
| Chris | WIN | SAFE | WIN | ELIM | NOM | WIN | SAFE | SAFE | ELIM | ELIM | ELIM | WIN | WIN | WINNER |
| Desi | RISK | WIN | SAFE | ELIM | RISK | WIN | WIN | SAFE | SAFE | SAFE | SAFE | WIN | RISK | WINNER |
| Chanelle | SAFE | SAFE | RISK | WIN | RISK | RISK | RISK | SAFE | SAFE | SAFE | RISK | RISK | ELIM | SECOND |
| Cory | WIN | RISK | WIN | WIN | SAFE | SAFE | RISK | SAFE | SAFE | SAFE | WIN | RISK | RISK | SECOND |
| Bananas | RISK | NOM | ELIM | RISK | SAFE | WIN | WIN | WIN | RISK | RISK | SAFE | SAFE | RISK | THIRD |
| Michaela | SAFE | WIN | SAFE | RISK | WIN | RISK | ELIM | SAFE | SAFE | WIN | WIN | SAFE | WIN | THIRD |
| Faysal | WIN | SAFE | WIN | SAFE | RISK | WIN | WIN | SAFE | WIN | WIN | SAFE | SAFE | ELIM | FOURTH |
| Tori | WIN | ELIM | WIN | SAFE | SAFE | WIN | WIN | WIN | WIN | RISK | RISK | SAFE | RISK | FOURTH |
| Josh | SAFE | SAFE | RISK | WIN | SAFE | SAFE | RISK | SAFE | SAFE | SAFE | SAFE | NOM | OUT | |
| Cassidy | WIN | SAFE | WIN | RISK | ELIM | WIN | WIN | RISK | NOM | ELIM | NOM | ELIM | OUT | |
| Michele | ELIM | SAFE | SAFE | WIN | SAFE | SAFE | SAFE | SAFE | SAFE | RISK | SAFE | OUT | | |
| Tyler | SAFE | WIN | RISK | RISK | WIN | SAFE | NOM | ELIM | RISK | RISK | OUT | | | |
| Wes | RISK | WIN | SAFE | RISK | WIN | ELIM | WIN | SAFE | SAFE | OUT | | | | |
| Alyssa S. | WIN | RISK | WIN | SAFE | WIN | RISK | RISK | NOM | RISK | OUT | | | | |
| Sebastian | WIN | RISK | WIN | RISK | RISK | WIN | WIN | RISK | OUT | | | | | |
| Monte | RISK | WIN | RISK | RISK | WIN | SAFE | RISK | OUT | | | | | | |
| Tiffany | SAFE | SAFE | SAFE | WIN | RISK | NOM | OUT | | | | | | | |
| Dusty | RISK | RISK | SAFE | WIN | RISK | OUT | | | | | | | | |
| Alyssa L. | WIN | RISK | WIN | SAFE | OUT | | | | | | | | | |
| Amanda | SAFE | WIN | NOM | OUT | | | | | | | | | | |
| Luis | NOM | WIN | SAFE | OUT | | | | | | | | | | |
| Paulie | SAFE | RISK | OUT | | | | | | | | | | | |
| Jonna | SAFE | OUT | | | | | | | | | | | | |
| Ameerah | OUT | | | | | | | | | | | | | |

Color key:

This contestant won the Final Challenge.
This contestant lost the Final Challenge.
The contestant was eliminated during the Final Challenge.
This contestant won the daily challenge.
This contestant was not selected for the Arena.
This contestant received votes through the Hopper, but was not selected for the Arena.
This contestant was nominated by the winning team/individuals but didn't have to compete in the Arena.
This contestant won the elimination in the Arena.
This contestant lost in the Arena and was eliminated.
This contestant was medically disqualified from the competition.

=== Team progress ===
| Contestants | Episodes | | | | | | | | | | | | | |
| Contestants | 1/2 | 2 | 3 | 4 | 5 | 6 | 7 | 8 | 9 | 10 | 11 | 12 | 13 | 14 |
|---|---|---|---|---|---|---|---|---|---|---|---|---|---|---|
| Chris | Blue | | | | | | Green | Individual; Game | | | | | | |
| Desi | Green | | | | Blue | | | Individual; Game | | | | | | |
| Chanelle | Red | | | | | | | Individual; Game | | | | | | |
| Cory | Blue | | | Red | | | | Individual; Game | | | | | | |
| Bananas | Red | | | Blue | | | | Individual; Game | | | | | | |
| Michaela | Green | | | | | | | Individual; Game | | | | | | |
| Faysal | Blue | | | | | | | Individual; Game | | | | | | |
| Tori | Blue | | | | | | | Individual; Game | | | | | | |
| Josh | Red | | | | | | | Individual; Game | | | | | | |
| Cassidy | Blue | | | | | | | Individual; Game | | | | | | |
| Michele | Red | | | | | | | Individual; Game | | | | | | |
| Tyler | Green | | | | | | | Individual; Game | | | | | | |
| Wes | Green | | | | | | Blue | Individual; Game | | | | | | |
| Alyssa S. | Blue | | | | Green | | | Individual; Game | | | | | | |
| Sebastian | Blue | | | | | | | Individual; Game | | | | | | |
| Monte | Green | | | | | | | Individual; Game | | | | | | |
| Tiffany | Red | | | | | | | | | | | | | |
| Dusty | Red | | | | | | | | | | | | | |
| Alyssa L. | Blue | | | | | | | | | | | | | |
| Amanda | Green | | | | | | | | | | | | | |
| Luis | Green | | | | | | | | | | | | | |
| Paulie | Red | | | | | | | | | | | | | |
| Jonna | Red | | | | | | | | | | | | | |
| Ameerah | Green | | | | | | | | | | | | | |

- Teams at the start of each episode

== Voting progress ==
| | Episode | | | | | | | | | | | | | | | | | | | | | | | | | |
| | 1/2 | | 2 | | 3 | | 4 | | 5 | | 6 | | 7 | | 8 | | 9 | | 10 | | 11 | | 12 | | 13 | |
|---|---|---|---|---|---|---|---|---|---|---|---|---|---|---|---|---|---|---|---|---|---|---|---|---|---|---|
| Winners' picks | Ameerah; 6 of 8 votes | | Bananas; 4 of 7 votes | | Amanda; 4 of 8 votes | | Desi; 3 of 6 votes | | Cassidy; 3 of 5 votes | | Tiffany; 5 of 7 votes | | Michaela; 4 of 7 votes | | Alyssa S. 2 of 2 votes | | Cassidy; 2 of 2 votes | | Alyssa S. 2 of 2 votes | | Cassidy; 2 of 2 votes | | Michele; 2 of 2 votes | | Cassidy; 2 of 2 votes | |
| Winners' picks | Luis; 7 of 8 votes | | Tori; 5 of 7 votes | | Bananas; 6 of 8 votes | | Luis; 3 of 6 votes | | Chris; 4 of 5 votes | | Wes; 7 of 7 votes | | Tyler; 5 of 7 votes | | Tyler; 2 of 2 votes | | Chris; 2 of 2 votes | | Chris; 2 of 2 votes | | Tyler; 2 of 2 votes | | Josh; 2 of 2 votes | | Faysal; 2 of 2 votes | |
| Hopper pick | Michele | | Jonna | | Paulie | | Amanda | Chris | Alyssa L. | | Dusty | | Tiffany | | Monte | | Sebastian | | Cassidy | Wes | Chris | | Cassidy | | Chanelle | Josh |
| Chris | Ameerah | Luis | Paulie | | Tiffany | Bananas | Amanda | Wes | Tiffany | | Tiffany | Wes | Alyssa S. | | Monte | | Alyssa S. | | Tori | Wes | Tori | | Michele | Josh | Cassidy | Faysal |
| Desi | Michele | | Bananas | Tori | Josh | | Amanda | Chris | Dusty | | Alyssa S. | Wes | Alyssa S. | Monte | Monte | | Tyler | | Cassidy | Tyler | Tori | | Michele | Josh | Tori | Bananas |
| Chanelle | Wes | | Jonna | | Tyler | | Amanda | Wes | Dusty | | Alyssa S. | | Josh | | Monte | | Tyler | | Cassidy | Tyler | Tori | | Cassidy | | Tori | Bananas |
| Cory | Ameerah | Luis | Dusty | | Amanda | Bananas | Desi | Luis | Tiffany | | Dusty | | Tiffany | | Sebastian | | Sebastian | | Cassidy | Tyler | Cassidy | Tyler | Cassidy | | Chanelle | Bananas |
| Bananas | Monte | | Alyssa L. | | Monte | | Michaela | Tyler | Faysal | | Alyssa S. | Wes | Michaela | Tyler | Alyssa S. | Tyler | Sebastian | | Cassidy | Tyler | Chris | | Cassidy | | Desi | Cory |
| Michaela | Bananas | | Bananas | Tori | Josh | | Cassidy | Wes | Not shown | | Alyssa S. | | Monte | | Monte | | Tyler | | Alyssa S. | Chris | Cassidy | Tyler | Cassidy | | Cassidy | Faysal |
| Faysal | Ameerah | Luis | Dusty | | Michele | Bananas | Michaela | Tyler | Desi | | Tiffany | Wes | Michaela | Tyler | Sebastian | | Cassidy | Chris | Alyssa S. | Chris | Chris | | Cassidy | | Chanelle | Bananas |
| Tori | Ameerah | Luis | Dusty | | Desi | Monte | Michaela | Monte | Alyssa L. | | Tiffany | Wes | Michaela | Tyler | Alyssa S. | Tyler | Cassidy | Chris | Cassidy | Tyler | Chris | | Cassidy | | Chanelle | Josh |
| Josh | Monte | | Alyssa S. | | Monte | | Desi | Luis | Chanelle | | Dusty | | Chanelle | | Sebastian | | Sebastian | | Cassidy | Wes | Chris | | Cassidy | | Chanelle | Bananas |
| Cassidy | Ameerah | Luis | Jonna | | Amanda | Bananas | Amanda | Tyler | Dusty | | Tiffany | Wes | Tiffany | Tyler | Monte | | Bananas | | Tori | Wes | Chris | | Chanelle | | Chanelle | Josh |
| Michele | Monte | | Jonna | | Monte | | Amanda | Luis | Dusty | | Dusty | | Tiffany | | Monte | | Tyler | | Cassidy | Tyler | Chris | | Cory | | | |
| Tyler | Dusty | | Not shown | | Paulie | | Amanda | Chris | Cassidy | Chris | Dusty | | Chanelle | | Sebastian | | Sebastian | | Michele | Bananas | Chanelle | | | | | |
| Wes | Dusty | | Not shown | | Chanelle | | Cassidy | Chris | Cassidy | Chris | Michaela | | Michaela | Chris | Cassidy | | Sebastian | | Cassidy | Tyler | | | | | | |
| Alyssa S. | Michaela | Luis | Jonna | | Amanda | Bananas | Amanda | Chris | Not shown | Chris | Dusty | | Chanelle | | Sebastian | | Sebastian | | Cassidy | Bananas | | | | | | |
| Sebastian | Ameerah | Luis | Paulie | | Tiffany | Monte | Amanda | Monte | Tiffany | | Tiffany | Wes | Tiffany | Tyler | Monte | | Tyler | | | | | | | | | |
| Monte | Bananas | | Bananas | Tori | Paulie | | Amanda | Sebastian | Cassidy | Chris | Dusty | | Chanelle | | Sebastian | | | | | | | | | | | |
| Tiffany | Wes | | Cory | | Tyler | | Cassidy | Wes | Sebastian | | Dusty | | Cory | | | | | | | | | | | | | |
| Dusty | Desi | | Cory | | Tyler | | Desi | Monte | Tiffany | | Chanelle | | | | | | | | | | | | | | | |
| Alyssa L. | Michaela | Monte | Jonna | | Amanda | Bananas | Amanda | Chris | Chanelle | | | | | | | | | | | | | | | | | |
| Amanda | Michele | | Chris | Tori | Monte | | Michaela | Chris | | | | | | | | | | | | | | | | | | |
| Luis | Bananas | | Bananas | Tori | Paulie | | Amanda | Bananas | | | | | | | | | | | | | | | | | | |
| Paulie | Monte | | Alyssa S. | | Monte | | | | | | | | | | | | | | | | | | | | | |
| Jonna | Michele | | Sebastian | | | | | | | | | | | | | | | | | | | | | | | |
| Ameerah | Bananas | | | | | | | | | | | | | | | | | | | | | | | | | |

== Episodes ==
| No. overall | No. in season | Title | Original release date | Prod. code | U.S. viewers (millions) |
|---|---|---|---|---|---|
| 13 | 1 | "The Riskiest Season Yet" | August 10, 2023 | 201 | 1.74 |
| 14 | 2 | "Blurred Battle Lines" | August 13, 2023 | 202 | 1.76 |
| 15 | 3 | "Civil War" | August 17, 2023 | 203 | 1.42 |
| 16 | 4 | "Double Crossed and Sideswiped" | August 20, 2023 | 204 | 1.62 |
| 17 | 5 | "Operation Hat Trick" | August 24, 2023 | 205 | 1.46 |
| 18 | 6 | "A Really Good Looking Underdog" | August 27, 2023 | 206 | 1.69 |
| 19 | 7 | "Give Me Liberty, or Give Me Love" | August 31, 2023 | 207 | 1.54 |
| 20 | 8 | "Independence Day" | September 7, 2023 | 208 | 1.49 |
| 21 | 9 | "Enemy of the State" | September 14, 2023 | 209 | 1.45 |
| 22 | 10 | "A Less Perfect Union" | September 21, 2023 | 210 | 1.50 |
| 23 | 11 | "Slippery Business" | September 28, 2023 | 211 | 1.44 |
| 24 | 12 | "Revenge Amongst the Ruins" | October 5, 2023 | 212 | 1.41 |
| 25 | 13 | "The Treason for the Season" | October 12, 2023 | 213 | 1.49 |
| 26 | 14 | "The Pursuit of Glory" | October 19, 2023 | 214 | 1.75 |
