= Real World: Ex-Plosion =

Coordinates: 37°47′16.5″N 122°25′15.8″W

- Season 29
- The initial cast of Real World: Ex-Plosion
- Starring: Ashley Mitchell; Cory Wharton; Jamie Larson; Jay Mitchell; Jenny Delich; Thomas Buell; Ashley Ceasar; Brian Williams Jr.; Hailey Chivers; Jenna Compono; Lauren Ondersma; Arielle Scott
- No. of episodes: 12

Release
- Original network: MTV
- Original release: January 8 – April 7, 2014

Season chronology
- ← Previous; The Real World: Portland Next → Real World: Skeletons

Real World: Ex-Plosion is the twenty-ninth season of MTV's reality television series Real World, which focuses on a group of diverse strangers living together for several months in a different city each season, as cameras follow their lives and interpersonal relationships. It is the eighth season of Real World to be filmed in the Pacific States region of the United States, specifically in California after The Real World: San Diego in 2011.

The season featured a total of twelve cast members over the course of the season. It is the seventh season to take place in a city that had hosted a previous season, as the show's third season was set in San Francisco in 1994. It is also the sixth season to be located in California. San Francisco, California was first reported as the location for the twenty-ninth season in August 2013. The house in San Francisco that was being used was first reported by the website Vevmo. Production began from late August until October 21, 2013, and the season later premiered on January 8, 2014, consisting of 12 episodes. The production participated in the San Francisco "Scene in San Francisco Incentive Program" administered by the San Francisco Film Commission.

After 21 years, this season marks the first significant change in the show's format. The cast narration "This is the true story...of seven strangers..." that was used during the previous 28 seasons was eliminated from the opening title sequence and replaced with a new introduction. The roommates move into their San Francisco home, develop relationships with one another and with the San Francisco locals. A month into the show, the cast goes on an off-the-grid vacation. When they return, they come to discover that many of their exes have moved in as additional roommates. The Exes were each misled by producers to believing that they would be a replacement roommate, unaware the other Exes would be moving in as well until move-in day.

== Season changes ==
In order to boost ratings, the producers made major change in the show's format. Besides bringing the cast members' exes into the house, the season included new graphics and a new filming style that added a new layer of realism by featuring the inclusion of the cameramen, conversations between the producers and the cast in and out of interviews and discussions about the fact that the cast are filming a show. The production crew also provided the cast a smart phone so they could take their own pictures, and also had a social website available that they could post their pictures on. As the season unfolds, some of that will have repercussions at home when people back home see photos. The house's phone room has a ooVoo setup for video calls.

== Employment ==
Most seasons of The Real World since the fifth season have included the assignment of a season-long group job or task to the housemates. Beginning in the 28th season, certain jobs in the area were approved by production that the cast had the liberty to apply for independently if desired. However, unlike last season, no cast member this season chose to take part in this particular work. Ashley Ceaser has a full-time job at a San Francisco start-up that she continues during production, Arielle works on his ongoing projects as a filmmaker, and Jenny auditions for and gets hired to be a gogo dancer.

== Residence ==
During shooting, the cast lived at 1244 Sutter Street between Polk Street and Van Ness Avenue, the former location of the Avalon Ballroom.

== Cast ==
This was the first season of Real World to feature twelve cast members consisting of seven original roommates and five additional roommates. The season started off with seven roommates, until one roommate left early. Later, the cast was joined by five additional roommates. The additional roommates were known as The Exes, people who the originals had previously dated.

Initial cast members of Real World: Ex-Plosion
| Cast member | Age^{1} | Hometown |
|---|---|---|
| Arielle Scott | 22 | Oakland, California |
Arielle is originally from Vallejo, California. She is the co-founder of a defunct Social Media website called "GenJuice," and attended the University of California, Berkeley. She has recently switched her career path is pursuing a career as a horror filmmaker and a model. In episode 5, Arielle is one of the only ones happy about her ex being in the house, but has a brief argument with her ex-girlfriend Ashley when she expresses a dislike of Arielle falsely thinking she needs to conform to Ashley's preferences of clothing in a partner. She later has to confront her own personal issues about people thinking that she is a male to female transgender in episode 7. She acts as the voice of reason in the house, but bands with the other originals in thinking the exes should move out.
| Ashley Mitchell | 26 | San Francisco, California |
Ashley is originally from Hurricane, West Virginia, but was living in San Francisco at the start of filming. She is an aspiring model and previously attended West Virginia University. and is dating a man named Francis who lives locally. In episode 3, after abandoning the house, she asks her roommates to vote whether they wanted her to stay. Based on her drunken, unstable behavior, many in the house voiced opposition and Ashley did not want to stay since all were not okay with it. Had she stayed, production had an ex of hers that would have moved in as well. She returns in episode 4 while her roommates are on vacation to retrieve her things. She also returns in episode 10, where she spends the night hanging out with Jenny. In the reunion, it is revealed her ex-fiancé Kyle would have likely moved in as part of the twist had she stayed in the house.
| Cory Wharton | 22 | Santa Monica, California |
Cory is originally from Grand Rapids, Michigan, but now works as a personal trainer in Santa Monica, California. He had been on and off with his ex-girlfriend, Lauren, since the seventh grade, before they went their separate ways. Previously a football star, he lost his athletic scholarship due to a pregnancy scare with a girl he was dating. He later discovered that the story was a complete hoax, which led him to leave school just a year before graduation. He immediately slept with Jenny two days into being in the house. Their romance ended when their exes arrived. In episode 7, his past experiences with pregnancy initially prevented him from supporting Lauren during her own pregnancy, but he later comforted her when she made the decision to leave. He later takes on the role of the mediator in the house when it comes to his other roommates and their problems with others. However, the rivalry between him and Brian finally came to a head when they fought in the van ride back home.
| Jamie Larson | 22 | Houston, Texas |
Originally from Pflugerville, Texas, Jamie is a columnist who writes an advice column website called ForeverShameless. She has also worked as a model. She is the only cast member whose ex did not participate on the show. Her ex, Asking Alexandria guitarist Cameron Liddell, did not move in due to his commitments with Asking Alexandria and belief that it would be unhealthy for both of them. She claims to be happy about him not coming. She developed a reputation of butting into people's personal business, which sparked a feud between her and the original Ashley. She also got in between Jay and Jenna's relationship because she did not like the way he treated her. She claims to have trust issues, which became an obstacle in her relationship with Thomas, especially when his ex, Hailey showed up.
| Jay Mitchell | 26 | The Bronx, New York |
Jay is a party promoter and DJ from the Bronx. In episode 3, his mother has cancer and unexpectedly dies due to complications from surgery shortly after production begins. He was looked at as a nice guy, but later kissed a girl when he was already in a long-term relationship. He was not happy when his girlfriend, Jenna showed up in the house but continued to be with her. It comes out that Jay has been cheating on Jenna since the day they met and continues to get girls' phone numbers while in the house. He later has to work hard in order to win Jenna back, but they soon reconcile.
| Jenny Delich | 23 | Los Angeles, California |
Jenny is originally from Kansas City, Missouri, but now works as a bartender, actress, singer and dancer in Los Angeles. She has also been a model and used to work as a real estate agent. After dating for five years, Jenny and Brian broke up due to their long-distance relationship, her sex drive, and his commitment issues in regards to moving to L.A. with her. Shortly after arriving in the house, she finds out that Brian is seeing someone else and begins a sexual relationship with Cory, which goes through its own problems. She is later shocked to find out that Brian has moved in and she and Cory mutually end things. She and Brian begin dating, but break up once again when he tells her that he kissed another girl at a club. Jenny makes it her duty to make Brian miserable, which leads to a serious fight in episode 8. She attempts to distance herself from Brian, who wants desperately to get back together with her. She also gets a job as a go-go dancer which upsets Brian. She later realizes that Brian has changed since coming on the show and that she wants nothing to do with him.
| Thomas Buell | 21 | Fort Worth, Texas |
Thomas is a student at the University of Texas at Arlington, where he is slated to graduate in 2014. He is a member of the Sigma Chi fraternity and goes to the same school as his twin brother. He begins dating Jamie, which shocks them both since they are not each other's types. He has trouble accepting the number of people she has slept with since he has a very low number and claims that he doesn't have sex, but makes love. When his ex Hailey moves in, Thomas is angry due to his past with her. It turns out that his trust issues stem from Hailey lying to him about being a virgin and her cheating on him with multiple men. He is also very vocal about not wanting her on the show which leads to a physical altercation with her in episode 9.

The Exes
| Cast member | Age^{1} | Hometown |
|---|---|---|
| Ashley Ceasar | 26 | Oakland, California |
At the time of filming, Ashley had recently split with Arielle. She maintained a full-time job for a food startup that she continues while on the show, resulting in her spending less time at the house than the others. Ashley and Arielle's relationship remains strong throughout the show, despite a brief argument over Arielle's insecurities at being considered androgynous.
| Brian Williams Jr. | 26 | Kansas City, Missouri |
Brian is a fitness model who has a five-year-long, on-again-off-again relationship with Jenny. Brian and Jenny initially try to reconcile their differences and get back together when he moves in, but his infidelity causes a physical altercation between the two. Brian also becomes concerned about the stark divide in the house between the "originals" and the "exes", causing tension between him, Jay, Thomas, and Cory, which culminates in a brawl between him and Cory in episode 11. In episode 12, Brian ends up getting drunk due to the stress of the experience, and ends up attacking the other cast members and must spend the night at a hotel.
| Hailey Chivers | 21 | Fort Worth, Texas |
Hailey is Thomas' ex-girlfriend. She went to the same high school as and attends the same college as him and his twin brother. She moves into the Real World house with the hope of getting back together. Hailey grows frustrated at Jamie's controlling nature and Thomas' repeated attempts to force her to move out, leading to a physical altercation with Thomas in episode 9. In episode 10, she leaves due to the stress of the house and the fact that she wasn't able to live with her ex Thomas dating Jamie in the house. Despite initial tension between her and Jamie, Hailey is able to become friends with her despite being Thomas' ex. Hailey is also close to Thomas' twin brother, who visits in episode 10 and consoles her.
| Jenna Compono | 20 | Wantagh, New York |
Jenna is a 20-year-old fashion model and secretary from Wantagh, NY. She has a complicated, unlabeled relationship with Jay. Jenna reveals to Jamie that she is unhappy with how Jay treats her, citing that they have never been on a true date in their two-year relationship. Jenna struggles with the decision of whether to forgive Jay's womanizing nature and stay with him or, at the urging of the other cast members, break up with him. Jenna reveals on the reunion show that she and Jay are no longer together, citing mistrust as the primary reason for their breakup.
| Lauren Ondersma | 23 | Brooklyn, New York |
Lauren is Cory's ex-girlfriend. She is originally from Grand Rapids, MI, but relocated to Brooklyn at the time of the show. They have known one another since high school and have dated on and off, but have not been officially together for nearly a year at time of filming. In episode 7, she leaves after finding out she is pregnant, although it is not Cory's, which causes tension between the two. On the reunion, she discloseda she is no longer pregnant.

^1 Age at time of filming

=== Duration of cast ===
| Cast member | Episodes | | | | | | | | | | | |
| Cast member | 1 | 2 | 3 | 4 | 5 | 6 | 7 | 8 | 9 | 10 | 11 | 12 |
|---|---|---|---|---|---|---|---|---|---|---|---|---|
| Arielle | Featured | Featured | Featured | Featured | Featured | Featured | Featured | Featured | Featured | Featured | Featured | Featured |
| Cory | Featured | Featured | Featured | Featured | Featured | Featured | Featured | Featured | Featured | Featured | Featured | Featured |
| Jamie | Featured | Featured | Featured | Featured | Featured | Featured | Featured | Featured | Featured | Featured | Featured | Featured |
| Jenny | Featured | Featured | Featured | Featured | Featured | Featured | Featured | Featured | Featured | Featured | Featured | Featured |
| Thomas | Featured | Featured | Featured | Featured | Featured | Featured | Featured | Featured | Featured | Featured | Featured | Featured |
| Jay | Featured | Featured | Left (Note: Jay voluntarily left the house in episode 3 to go to his mother's funeral and returned to the house in the same episode.) | Featured | Featured | Featured | Featured | Featured | Featured | Featured | Featured | Featured |
| Ashley C. | | | Appeared (Note: Prior to debuting as a cast member, Ashley C. visited in the house in Episode 4.) | Entered (Note: The exes (Ashley C., Brian, Hailey, Jenna, and Lauren) came into the house in episode 5.) | Featured | Featured | Featured | Featured | Featured | Featured | Featured | Featured |
| Brian | | | | Entered | Featured | Featured | Featured | Featured | Featured | Featured | Featured | Featured |
| Jenna | | | | Entered | Featured | Featured | Featured | Featured | Featured | Featured | Featured | Featured |
| Hailey | | | | Entered | Featured | Featured | Featured | Featured | Featured | Left (Note: Hailey voluntarily left the house in episode 10 after multiple physical altercations with Thomas.) | | |
| Lauren | | | | Entered | Featured | Featured | Left (Note: Lauren voluntarily left the house in episode 7 after finding out she was pregnant.) | | | | | |
| Ashley M. | Featured | Featured | Left (Note: Ashley M. voluntarily chooses to leave the house after asking her roommates on her own accord to vote whether they would like her to stay. The majority voted they would like her to leave, and she honors their opinion and leaves on her own.) | Return (Note: Ashley M. returned to the house in episode 4 to gather her belongings.) | | | | | | Return (Note: Ashley M. returned to the house in episode 10 to spend the night with Jenny.) | | |

== Episodes ==
| No. overall | No. in season | Title | Original release date | U.S. viewers (millions) |
|---|---|---|---|---|
| 554 | 1 | "Excess Baggage" | January 8, 2014 | 0.94 |
Seven single strangers move into their San Francisco home and immediately begin checking each other out for hook-up potential. When Arielle catches Thomas' attention, the girls decide not to tell the guys that Arielle is a lesbian yet. West-Virginia-transplant-posing-as-San-Francisco-native Ashley's drunken behavior offends the roommates on two different occasions. Jenny takes a liking to Cory, who unfortunately reminds her too much of her ex-boyfriend. Jamie and Thomas grow closer.
| 555 | 2 | "A Numbers Game" | January 15, 2014 | 0.99 |
The line between sex and love becomes blurred for budding couple, Jamie and Thomas, when a shocked Jamie learns that Thomas has only slept with three women and Thomas later grows disgusted after learning that Jamie has slept with sixteen people. Jenny and Cory's secret sexual relationship grows, but hits a dead end when Cory, Arielle and Jay are involved in a street brawl, leading Cory to act out.
| 556 | 3 | "The Departure" | January 22, 2014 | 1.29 |
Jay tries to figure out who ripped his paper with all of his phone contacts and later receives word that his mother died due to her cancer. Ashley's drunken behavior returns and, due to all the stress in the house, she goes missing. She later calls the house and asks the roommates to make a decision on whether or not she should return. Things explode between Jenny and Cory, when he grows jealous of her talking to another guy. A sexually frustrated Arielle is excited about the arrival of her ex-girlfriend, Ashley.
| 557 | 4 | "Ex-otic Encounters" | January 29, 2014 | 1.36 |
Arielle takes the roommates to an erotic dinner in order to relieve the sexual tension in the house. Jay worries that his ex-girlfriend Jenna will be able to see the things that he does with girls at the club. The roommates go on a two-day boat trip. Ashley retrieves her belongings while the roommates are gone and moves out. Hours later, the cast's exes finally arrive at the house to deliver the shock of their lives.
| 558 | 5 | "Ex-Plosion" | February 5, 2014 | 1.54 |
In a shocking twist, the roommates return from their trip to discover their exes have moved into the house, about which many of the original cast is disappointed. Jenny and Cory decide to stop hooking up in order to work things out with their exes. Jamie grows worried that her ex will show up to the house, which makes Thomas suspicious. Jamie thinks Thomas' ex, Hailey, has a secret agenda.
| 559 | 6 | "First Love Fools" | February 19, 2014 | 1.75 |
Thomas grows confused over his feelings for Jamie and Hailey and contemplates breaking up with Jamie in order to be single. Jenny's outlandish behavior embarrasses her ex Brian, leading to a huge argument between them. Jenna begins to annoy Jay with her antics. Cory and his ex Lauren are in a good place and have unprotected sex. Soon after, Lauren finds out she is pregnant.
| 560 | 7 | "The Test" | February 26, 2014 | 1.45 |
Lauren tells Cory she is pregnant, and he immediately gets angry especially after realizing that it's not his baby. Lauren decides to go home in order to deal with her situation. Arielle has to confront her self-identity issues after learning that some people on the Internet think she may be transgender due to her androgynous clothing. Her girlfriend Ashley has an issue with Arielle feeling like she can't be herself around Ashley. Brian and Jenny are finally in a good place, until Brian kisses another girl while hanging with the guys.
| 561 | 8 | "Betrayed and Beatdown" | March 5, 2014 | 1.38 |
Brian contemplates telling Jenny that he kissed another girl. When he does, Jenny decides to break up with him and seeks revenge by hooking up with another guy at the club. Brian and Jenny later have a physical altercation after Cory boosts Brian's ego. Jamie creates drama between Jay and Jenna by telling him that Jenna isn't happy with their relationship. Thomas desperately wants Hailey to go home.
| 562 | 9 | "Indecent Ex-posure" | March 12, 2014 | 1.43 |
Hailey grows frustrated with the state of her and Tom's friendship, leading to a physical brawl between the two one drunken night. Jay discovers a video of him that the producers put online and hides it from Jenna. Jamie decides to tell Jenna about the video and, when she sees it, Jenna is forced to make a decision about her relationship. Brian and Cory develop a "bromance" which the rest of the roommates view as fake. Brian also has a problem with the divide in the house between the originals and the exes.
| 563 | 10 | "Burned to Ashes" | March 19, 2014 | 1.32 |
Thomas's twin brother visits the house and comforts Hailey, who regrets her belligerent behavior towards Thomas the previous night. Hailey decides to go home in order to salvage her friendship with Thomas. Tired of Brian being around her 24/7, Jenny decides to spend a night out on the town with former roommate Ashley, which doesn't sit well with Brian. Jenna has to choose between doing what everyone wants her to do and breaking up with Jay or giving him another chance.
| 564 | 11 | "It's Go Go Time" | March 26, 2014 | 1.16 |
Arielle prepares to make a horror film while her relationship with Ashley continues to grow. Jenny grows worried because she has no money to pay her bills, which makes Brian angry because he feels it is beneath her. The cast goes to the Folsom Street Fair and are surprised by the amount of fetish. They also go to Napa Valley for a spa day and wine tasting and Jenny becomes upset about Thomas' classless ways. Brian grows jealous when Jenny and Cory seem to grow closer. The guys grow tired about Brian's complaining about Jenny. At a club, Cory grows furious when Brian goes after his "sloppy seconds", leading to a brawl during the ride back home.
| 565 | 12 | "The Ex-odus" | April 2, 2014 | 1.18 |
The producers separate Cory and Brian after the fight in the van. The next day, Brian and Cory decide to be cordial for the rest of their stay in the house. As time winds down in the house, Jamie and Thomas discuss whether or not, they should get into a long-distance relationship. Jenny decides to never to get back together with Brian, because she doesn't know who he is anymore. After the cast gets drunk on their last night, Brian goes crazy and attacks his fellow cast members. He is forced to spend the night in a hotel. The next day, the roommates pack their bags and reminisce about the season before going their separate ways.

== After filming ==
The Real World: Ex-Plosion Reunion aired on April 7, 2014. It was hosted by Girl Code star Nessa, and featured the entire cast, as they discussed their time during filming and their lives since the show ended.

At the time of the reunion, Cory returned to Los Angeles and is currently a trainer. He is working on his brand and is working on his own health website. He still keeps in touch with Lauren, who is back in Michigan. Jenny also returned to Los Angeles and got back together with Brian, who moved in with her. Jamie and Thomas returned to Texas, and Jamie still models, bartends and spends most of her time with Thomas. Thomas graduated from college and hopes to become a dentist one day. Arielle returned to Oakland, where she still models and still aspires to be a horror filmmaker. She is still with Ashley, although they don't see each other as often since Ashley moved closer to her job. Jay went back home to New York City and spends more time with his father in the wake of his mother's death. He is focused on his watch line and is donating half of the proceeds to cancer research. He and Jenna are not together.

Among the topics discussed were the tension between Jenny and Cory, while the entire cast gave their opinions on Jenny and Brian's volatile relationship which makes Jenny break down due to what she went through during growing up. Lauren's pregnancy was also brought up but she did not give too much details away. Jamie and Thomas' current relationship was also discussed and everyone found out the reason why Jamie and her ex, Cameron broke up and why she did not want him on the show as they got to hear from him. The love triangle between Thomas, Jamie, and Hailey was also discussed as they all seem to get along now. When asked why they broke up, Jenna revealed that Jay was acting inappropriately with his ex-girlfriend and that she can no longer trust him. The cast also called Jay out for being a shady liar during their time in the house with Arielle stating that she does not want to have fake friends. The original Ashley is brought out and talks about her insecurity, the regret she feels about ripping up Jay's phone numbers which cost him time with his mother. The feud between Ashley and Jamie is also discussed and they agree that they will never be friends. Ashley is apparently living in Paris with her boyfriend, Francis. The reunion also featured footage of Ashley's ex-fiancée, Kyle, who would've moved in the house if Ashley had stayed. The cast talked about the season finale and how Jenny seems to think that Brian was possessed by a demon during the last night. Lastly, they talked about who would want to compete on The Challenge.

On July 31, 2015, Jenny gave birth to her and Brian's first child, their daughter Violet Marie.

In 2017, Cheyenne Floyd from Are You the One? gave birth to her and Cory's daughter, Ryder. In 2018, they joined the cast of Teen Mom OG and, in the subsequent year, they also appeared on How Far Is Tattoo Far? Wharton also appeared on the first season of Ex on the Beach with ex-girlfriend Alicia Wright. There he met Are You the One? alumna Taylor Selfridge. On April 22, 2020, Wharton and Selfridge welcomed their first daughter, Mila Mae. A Teen Mom OG special episode was planned for the occasion, but was pulled off the air after some 2012 racially insensitive tweets from Selfridge resurfaced online. On June 1, 2022, Selfridge gave birth to the couple's second daughter, Maya Grace.

Jay was featured in episode 18 of the seventh season of Catfish: The TV Show.

In 2019, Jenna Compono got engaged to Zach Nichols from The Real World: San Diego. The two first met on the 26th season of The Challenge and appeared on multiple seasons together afterwards. In 2021, Nichols and Compono announced they were expecting their first child. After postponing the wedding to 2022 due to the COVID-19 pandemic, the couple had a more intimate ceremony on March 13, 2021. Their first son, Anthony Joseph Nichols, was born on September 2, 2021. On December 27, 2022, the couple welcomed daughter Liliana Marie. On February 24, 2024, Compono gave birth to daughter Carmella Jean. On August 10, 2025, the couple welcomed daughter Francesca Rose. Vincent John Nichols, the couple's fifth child, was born on August 2, 2026.

Ashley Ceasar was a cast member on the fourth season of Ex on the Beach with former girlfriend and Real World: Skeletons' alumna Nicole Zanatta. The couple later appeared on True Life Presents: Quarantine Stories.

Ashley Mitchell was a cast member on the dating show Match Me If You Can. In 2026, she competed on the third season of House of Villains.

=== The Challenge ===
| Cast member | Seasons of The Challenge | Other appearances |
|---|---|---|
| Arielle Scott | —N/a | —N/a |
| Ashley Mitchell | Rivals III, Invasion of the Champions, XXX: Dirty 30, Final Reckoning, War of the Worlds, War of the Worlds 2, Total Madness, Double Agents, Spies, Lies & Allies, Vets & New Threats | The Challenge: Champs vs. Pros, The Challenge: Champs vs. Stars (season 1), The Challenge: Champs vs. Stars (season 2), The Challenge: All Stars (season 5) |
| Cory Wharton | Battle of the Bloodlines, Rivals III, Invasion of the Champions, XXX: Dirty 30, Vendettas, Final Reckoning, Total Madness, Double Agents, Spies, Lies & Allies, Battle of the Eras, Cutthroat (2026) | The Challenge: Champs vs. Stars (season 2), The Challenge: USA (season 2) |
| Jamie Larson | —N/a | —N/a |
| Jay Mitchell | Battle of the Exes II | The Challenge: All Stars (season 4) |
| Jenny Delich | —N/a | —N/a |
| Thomas Buell | Battle of the Exes II, Battle of the Bloodlines, Rivals III | —N/a |
| Ashley Ceasar | —N/a | —N/a |
| Brian Williams Jr. | —N/a | —N/a |
| Hailey Chivers | Battle of the Exes II | —N/a |
| Jenna Compono | Battle of the Exes II, Battle of the Bloodlines, Rivals III, Invasion of the Champions, XXX: Dirty 30, Final Reckoning, War of the Worlds, Total Madness | The Challenge: Champs vs. Stars (season 2) |
| Lauren Ondersma | —N/a | —N/a |

Note: Ashley M. made an appearance on Vendettas for an elimination
