= Are You the One? season 4 =

American reality television program

Are You the One?
- Season 4
- Presented by: Ryan Devlin
- No. of contestants: 20
- Location: Maui, Hawaii
- No. of episodes: 10

Release
- Original network: MTV
- Original release: June 13 – August 22, 2016

Season chronology
- ← Previous; Season 3 Next → Season 5

The fourth season of MTV's reality dating series Are You the One? premiered on June 13, 2016.

== Cast ==
Male cast members	Age	Hometown
Asaf Goren	25	Tel Aviv, Israel
Cam Bruckman	22	Fort Collins, Colorado
Cameron Kolbo	25	Hattiesburg, Mississippi
Giovanni Rivera	23	Bridgeport, Connecticut
John Humphrey	23	Norfolk, Nebraska
Morgan St. Pierre	24	Manhattan, New York
Prosper Muna	24	Albany, New York
Sam Handler	22	Barrington, Illinois
Stephen McHugh	24	Philadelphia, Pennsylvania
Tyler Norman	26	San Diego, California

Female cast members	Age	Hometown
Alyssa Ortiz	22	Elgin, Illinois
Camille Satterwhite	23	Wheatley Heights, New York
Emma Sweigard	22	Parker, Colorado
Francesca Duncan	22	Manhattan, New York
Julia Rose	22	New Orleans, Louisiana
Kaylen Zahara	22	Compton, California
Mikala Thomas	22	Ocean City, New Jersey
Nicole Brown	22	Denver, Colorado
Tori Deal	23	Astoria, New York
Victoria Wyatt	22	Chino Hills, California

== Progress ==
Guys	Ceremony									
Guys	1	2	3	4	5	6	7	8	9	10
Asaf	Francesca	Camille	Camille	Camille	Camille	Camille	Francesca	Camille	Tori	Kaylen
Cam	Victoria	Julia	Nicole	Emma	Emma	Victoria	Nicole	Tori	Nicole	Julia
Cameron	Mikala	Mikala	Mikala	Mikala	Mikala	Mikala	Mikala	Mikala	Mikala	Mikala
Giovanni	Kaylen	Kaylen	Kaylen	Kaylen	Francesca	Francesca	Emma	Nicole	Francesca	Francesca
John	Emma	Nicole	Victoria	Victoria	Tori	Emma	Kaylen	Kaylen	Victoria	Victoria
Morgan	Julia	Alyssa	Francesca	Tori	Julia	Tori	Tori	Victoria	Julia	Tori
Prosper	Camille	Emma	Emma	Nicole	Victoria	Kaylen	Victoria	Francesca	Emma	Emma
Sam	Alyssa	Francesca	Alyssa	Alyssa	Alyssa	Alyssa	Alyssa	Alyssa	Alyssa	Alyssa
Stephen	Nicole	Tori	Tori	Julia	Nicole	Julia	Julia	Julia	Kaylen	Nicole
Tyler	Tori	Victoria	Julia	Francesca	Kaylen	Nicole	Camille	Emma	Camille	Camille
Correct matches	3	3	4	4	4	4	4	2	6	10

Girls	Ceremony									
Girls	1	2	3	4	5	6	7	8	9	10
Alyssa	Sam	Morgan	Sam	Sam	Sam	Sam	Sam	Sam	Sam	Sam
Camille	Prosper	Asaf	Asaf	Asaf	Asaf	Asaf	Tyler	Asaf	Tyler	Tyler
Emma	John	Prosper	Prosper	Cam	Cam	John	Giovanni	Tyler	Prosper	Prosper
Francesca	Asaf	Sam	Morgan	Tyler	Giovanni	Giovanni	Asaf	Prosper	Giovanni	Giovanni
Julia	Morgan	Cam	Tyler	Stephen	Morgan	Stephen	Stephen	Stephen	Morgan	Cam
Kaylen	Giovanni	Giovanni	Giovanni	Giovanni	Tyler	Prosper	John	John	Stephen	Asaf
Mikala	Cameron	Cameron	Cameron	Cameron	Cameron	Cameron	Cameron	Cameron	Cameron	Cameron
Nicole	Stephen	John	Cam	Prosper	Stephen	Tyler	Cam	Giovanni	Cam	Stephen
Tori	Tyler	Stephen	Stephen	Morgan	John	Morgan	Morgan	Cam	Asaf	Morgan
Victoria	Cam	Tyler	John	John	Prosper	Cam	Prosper	Morgan	John	John
Correct matches	3	3	4	4	4	4	4	2	6	10

Notes

- Name Unconfirmed perfect match
- Name Confirmed perfect match
- Due to the blackout in Episode 8, the whole cast lost $250,000, lowering the total money at the end to $750,000.

=== Truth Booths ===
Couple	Episode	Result
Prosper & Tori	1	Not A Match
John & Julia	2	Not A Match
Cameron & Mikala	3	Perfect Match
Asaf & Tori	4	Not A Match
Giovanni & Kaylen	5	Not A Match
Sam & Alyssa	6	Perfect Match
Cam & Victoria	7	Not A Match
Giovanni & Julia	8	Not A Match
Prosper & Emma	9	Perfect Match
Cam & Julia	10	Perfect Match

== Episodes ==
No. overall	No. in season	Title	Original release date	U.S. viewers (millions)
31	1	"Perfect Match at First Sight"	June 13, 2016	0.69
32	2	"Punch Drunk Love"	June 20, 2016	0.54
33	3	"She Don't Want You"	June 27, 2016	0.74
Perfect Match #1: Cameron & Mikala
34	4	"Three's a Crowd"	July 11, 2016	0.70
35	5	"Beer Goggles"	July 18, 2016	0.69
36	6	"Mommas' Boys"	July 25, 2016	0.68
Perfect Match #2: Sam & Alyssa
37	7	"Pulling Punches"	August 1, 2016	0.65
38	8	"Great Ex-pectations"	August 8, 2016	0.54
39	9	"All or Nothing"	August 15, 2016	0.74
40	10	"All or Nothing"	August 15, 2016	0.674
Perfect Match #3: Prosper & Emma; Perfect Match #4: Cam & Julia

== After filming ==
Asaf Goren & Kaylen Zahara, Cameron Kolbo & Mikala Thomas, Giovanni Rivera & Francesca Duncan and Morgan St. Pierre & Tori Deal returned for Are You The One?: Second Chances.

In addition to his appearances on MTV programs, Asaf Goren has also competed on So You Think You Can Dance 12, Worst Cooks in America 12 and Celebrity Big Brother Israel 3. He also appeared on RuPaul's Drag Race as a member of the Pit Crew.

Cameron Kolbo appeared on the first season of Ex on the Beach.

=== The Challenge ===
Cast member	Seasons of The Challenge	Other appearances
Asaf Goren	Total Madness, Battle for a New Champion	—N/a
Tori Deal	XXX: Dirty 30, Final Reckoning, War of the Worlds 2, Total Madness, Double Agents, Spies, Lies & Allies, Ride or Dies, Battle of the Eras, Cutthroat (2026)	The Challenge: Champs vs. Stars (season 1), The Challenge: Champs vs. Stars (season 2), The Challenge: World Championship, The Challenge: USA (season 2)

Note: Tori appeared on Vendettas and Battle for a New Champion for an elimination
