= How Far Is Tattoo Far? =

Reality television show

- Also known as: Just Tattoo of Us USA
- Genre: Reality television
- Based on: Just Tattoo of Us
- Presented by: Nicole Polizzi; Nico Tortorella; Justina Valentine
- Country of origin: United States
- Original language: English
- No. of seasons: 2
- No. of episodes: 30

Production
- Executive producers: Arthur Borman; Dan Cesareo; Fernando Mills; John Varela; Lucilla D'Agostino; Shelley Sinha
- Production companies: Big Fish Entertainment; Gobstopper Television

Original release
- Network: MTV
- Release: October 11, 2018 – October 3, 2019

How Far Is Tattoo Far? is an American reality television series hosted by Nicole Polizzi (Justina Valentine was added on as a host during the second season for Polizzi's maternity leave) and Nico Tortorella that premiered October 11, 2018 on MTV. It is the US version of the UK series Just Tattoo of Us. Each episode features pairs of friends or family who have each designed a tattoo for the other. The tattoo is not revealed to the recipient until the end of the show, keeping them and the viewer in suspense.

== Casting ==
The first season featured: Nilsa Prowant and Aimee Hall from Floribama Shore; Angelina Pivarnick from Jersey Shore with her then-fiancée Chris Larangeira; Cara Maria Sorbello and Paulie Calafiore from The Challenge; and Soju from RuPaul's Drag Race.

The second season featured: Cheyenne Floyd and Cory Wharton from Teen Mom OG; Codi Butts and Kirk Medas from Floribama Shore; Zach Holmes and Chad Tepper from Too Stupid to Die; Tony Raines and Alyssa Giacone from Real World: Skeletons; Kailah Casillas from Real World: Go Big or Go Home along with Mikey P from From G's to Gents.

== Episodes ==
=== Series overview ===
| Season | Episodes | Originally released | |
| Season | Episodes | First released | Last released |
|---|---|---|---|
| 1 | 10 | October 11, 2018 | November 8, 2018 |
| 2 | 20 | May 23, 2019 | October 3, 2019 |

=== Season 1 (2018) ===
| No. overall | No. in season | Title | Original release date | U.S. viewers (millions) |
|---|---|---|---|---|
| 1 | 1 | "Secrets from the Shore" | October 11, 2018 | 0.61 |
| 2 | 2 | "Politics That Stink" | October 11, 2018 | 0.54 |
| 3 | 3 | "Drunk Lessons" | October 18, 2018 | 0.48 |
| 4 | 4 | "Mamma Knows Best" | October 18, 2018 | 0.46 |
| 5 | 5 | "Bama Babes Bust Out" | October 25, 2018 | 0.61 |
| 6 | 6 | "Freaks on Fleek" | October 25, 2018 | 0.56 |
| 7 | 7 | "Down in the Dumps" | November 1, 2018 | 0.58 |
| 8 | 8 | "Balls Deep Challenge" | November 1, 2018 | 0.56 |
| 9 | 9 | "Payback for a Lifetime" | November 8, 2018 | 0.62 |
| 10 | 10 | "Money Where Your Mouth Is" | November 8, 2018 | 0.56 |

=== Season 2 (2019) ===
| No. overall | No. in season | Title | Original release date | U.S. viewers (millions) |
|---|---|---|---|---|
| 11 | 1 | "Rev My Engine" | May 23, 2019 | 0.50 |
| 12 | 2 | "Kirk and Codi's Bama Bro-down" | May 23, 2019 | 0.46 |
| 13 | 3 | "Shit Hits the Fan" | May 23, 2019 | 0.45 |
| 14 | 4 | "Deadly Secret" | May 23, 2019 | 0.40 |
| 15 | 5 | "Kailah Exposes the Truth" | May 30, 2019 | 0.30 |
| 16 | 6 | "Free the Nipple" | May 30, 2019 | 0.24 |
| 17 | 7 | "A Permanent Proposition" | June 6, 2019 | 0.27 |
| 18 | 8 | "Tony's Ultimate Challenge" | June 6, 2019 | 0.31 |
| 19 | 9 | "Worst Appointment Ever" | June 13, 2019 | 0.36 |
| 20 | 10 | "Suck on This" | June 13, 2019 | 0.36 |
| 21 | 11 | "Once a Cheater, Always a Cheater" | June 20, 2019 | 0.42 |
| 22 | 12 | "Liar, Liar, Ass on Fire" | June 20, 2019 | 0.40 |
| 23 | 13 | "Feeling Crabby" | June 20, 2019 | 0.35 |
| 24 | 14 | "Throuple or Nah?" | June 20, 2019 | 0.31 |
| 25 | 15 | "Cutting the Cord" | September 19, 2019 | 0.28 |
| 26 | 16 | "Pick Up your Baggage" | September 19, 2019 | 0.24 |
| 27 | 17 | "Who's Crying Now?" | September 26, 2019 | 0.21 |
| 28 | 18 | "Karma's a Bitch" | September 26, 2019 | 0.26 |
| 29 | 19 | "Not Too Stupid To Tattoo" | October 3, 2019 | 0.27 |
| 30 | 20 | "Crappy Situation" | October 3, 2019 | 0.32 |
