= The Challenge: Final Reckoning =

32nd season of the reality television series

Final Reckoning
- Season 32
- Presented by: T. J. Lavin
- No. of contestants: 34
- Winners: Ashley Mitchell; Hunter Barfield
- Location: Hermanus, South Africa
- No. of episodes: 22 (including the two-part Reunion special/finale)

Release
- Original network: MTV
- Original release: July 10 – December 4, 2018

Season chronology
- ← Previous; Vendettas Next → War of the Worlds

The Challenge: Final Reckoning is the 32nd season of the MTV reality competition series The Challenge. This season featured alumni from The Real World, Road Rules, The Challenge, Are You the One?, the U.S. version of Big Brother, and the U.K. television shows Ex on the Beach and Geordie Shore, competing along with, for the first time, alumni from Bad Girls Club and Vanderpump Rules who appeared on the U.S. version of Ex on the Beach. The season premiered on July 10, 2018 on MTV.

== Format ==
Contestants are competing in pairs with someone they have a vendetta against (i.e. a rival or ex), who are unknown to them until they successfully survive the Opening Challenge. The elements of the game are as follows:

- Daily Missions: Each round, the pairs compete in a challenge. The winning team is immune from elimination and has the "Power Vote" in the Reckoning Vote.
- Reckoning Vote: Following the Daily Mission, teams have to secretly vote one of the losing pairs for the Elimination Round. The "Power Vote" counts as two votes, but may only be cast on one team.
- Elimination Rounds (Armageddon): At the "Armageddon", the results of the Reckoning Vote are revealed to the players. In the event of a tied vote, the pair holding the "Power Vote" hold the tie-breaking vote (but should they not be able to reach a decision, then they become the nominated pair). The teams who voted for the nominated team are also revealed, and the nominated team has to call-out a non-immune team who voted for them. The two teams then face each other in the Armageddon. The losing pair is eliminated, while the winners stay in the game.

In the end, the Final Four teams compete in the Final Challenge for $1,000,000, with the winning team taking it all. Unbeknownst to the contestants until the final challenge, the person who accrues a faster time during aspects of the final challenge that are individually timed has a choice between keeping all the money to themselves or sharing it with their partner.

Twists

- Redemption House: Similar to XXX: Dirty 30, the "Redemption House" gives eliminated teams a chance to re-enter the main game. Periodically, the teams in Redemption House participate in a Double Cross Draw. The team who picked the XX Card will challenge a fellow Redemption pair to an "Apocalypse Challenge", while the teams not picked are officially eliminated from the game and are sent home. The winning team from the "Apocalypse Challenge" returns to the main game, while the losing team stays in "Redemption House", awaiting the next Draw & Challenge.
- Purges: Some challenges are designated as Purges, where the losing team is immediately eliminated, while the winning team gains an advantage for the next Daily Mission.
- Mercenaries: For some of the Elimination Rounds, the Nominated pairs have to face a Mercenary team - late entrants into the game who compete to earn their spot in the game.

== Contestants ==
Male contestants	Original season	Finish
Hunter Barfield (Note: Ashley & Hunter arrived in the game in Episode 7 as a mercenary team. Ashley & Hunter were automatically sent in to the Armaggedon and faced off with Angela & Faith, the team voted in by the house.)	Are You the One? 3	Winner (Note: After winning the final Challenge, Ashley had the fastest time against Hunter and made a decision to take all of the monetary prize for herself.)
Joss Mooney	Ex on the Beach UK 1	Runner-up
Paulie Calafiore	Big Brother 18	Third place
Johnny "Bananas" Devenanzio	The Real World: Key West	Episode 19
Tony Raines (Note: Bananas' original partner, Devin Walker-Molaghan, withdrew from the competition prior to arrival due to his father's death. Devin was replaced by Tony Raines in Episode 2.)	Real World: Skeletons	Episode 19
Nelson Thomas	Are You the One? 3	Episode 17
Shane Landrum	Road Rules: Campus Crawl	Episode 17
Cory Wharton (Note: Cory & Devin arrived at the game in Episode 13 as a mercenary team, they automatically go into elimination and must win in order to win their spot in the main game or otherwise go straight to the Redemption House.)	Real World: Ex-Plosion	Episode 17 (Note: Cory was disqualified from the competition in Episode 16, after He engaged in a physical altercation with Tony. Devin was sent home as a result of being Cory's partner.)
Devin Walker-Molaghan	Are You the One? 3	Episode 17
Jozea Flores	Big Brother 18	Episode 13
Zach Nichols	The Real World: San Diego (2011)	Episode 13 (Note: Zach suffered a broken nose during the "Shake It Off" Armageddon in Episode 13. After being sent to the Redemption House, he participated in the double-cross with his partner Amanda in Episode 15. However, prior to the "That's the Ticket" Apocalypse challenge during that same episode, Zach was declared medically unable to continue competing, and Amanda was sent home as the result of being Zach's partner.)
Brad Fiorenza	The Real World: San Diego (2004)	Episode 12
Kyle Christie	Geordie Shore 8	Episode 12
Derrick Henry	Are You the One? 5	Episode 7
Chris "CT" Tamburello	The Real World: Paris	Episode 5
Chuck Mowery	Are You the One? 3	Episode 1

Female contestants	Original season	Finish
Ashley Mitchell	Real World: Ex-Plosion	Winner
Sylvia Elsrode	Real World: Skeletons	Runner-up
Natalie Negrotti	Big Brother 18	Third place
Cara Maria Sorbello	The Challenge: Fresh Meat II	Fourth place
Marie Roda	The Real World: St. Thomas	Fourth place
Kam Williams	Are You the One? 5	Episode 18
Kayleigh Morris	Ex on the Beach UK 2	Episode 18
Da'Vonne Rogers	Big Brother 17	Episode 13
Amanda Garcia	Are You the One? 3	Episode 13
Angela Babicz	Bad Girls Club: Twisted Sisters	Episode 8
Faith Stowers	Vanderpump Rules	Episode 8
Tori Deal	Are You the One? 4	Episode 7
Veronica Portillo	Road Rules: Semester at Sea	Episode 5
Kailah Casillas	Real World: Go Big or Go Home	Episode 2 (Note: Kailah and Melissa were both disqualified from the competition at the end of Episode 1, after they engaged in a physical altercation with each other. Since their respective partners, Kam and Kayleigh, were left without a partner, Kam and Kayleigh were paired up with each other at the beginning of Episode 2.)
Melissa Reeves	Ex on the Beach UK 2	Episode 2
Britni Thornton	Are You the One? 3	Episode 1
Jemmye Carroll	The Real World: New Orleans (2010)	Episode 1
Jenna Compono	Real World: Ex-Plosion	Episode 1

=== Teams ===
Team	Partner 1	Partner 2
Amanda & Zach	Amanda Garcia	Zach Nichols
Angela & Faith	Angela Babicz	Faith Stowers
Ashley & Hunter	Ashley Mitchell	Hunter Barfield
Bananas & Tony	Johnny "Bananas" Devenanzio	Tony Raines
Brad & Kyle	Brad Fiorenza	Kyle Christie
Britni & Chuck	Britni Thornton	Chuck Mowery
Cara Maria & Marie	Cara Maria Sorbello	Marie Roda
Cory & Devin	Cory Wharton	Devin Walker-Molaghan
CT & Veronica	Chris "CT" Tamburello	Veronica Portillo
Da'Vonne & Jozea	Da'Vonne Rogers	Jozea Flores
Derrick & Tori	Derrick Henry	Tori Deal
Jemmye & Jenna	Jemmye Carroll	Jenna Compono
Joss & Sylvia	Joss Mooney	Sylvia Elsrode
Kailah & Kayleigh	Kailah Casillas	Kayleigh Morris
Kam & Melissa	Kam Williams	Melissa Reeves
Natalie & Paulie	Natalie Negrotti	Paulie Calafiore
Nelson & Shane	Nelson Thomas	Shane Landrum

=== Pre-season team backgrounds ===
==== Male teams ====
- Bananas & Tony: The two initially bonded on Rivals III. Their alliance would remain strong until Vendettas, when Tony voted Bananas into an elimination, which he lost.
- Brad & Kyle: The two first met on Vendettas, where Brad used a grenade to make Kyle sit out of a challenge. Kyle's team eventually lost the challenge and Kyle declared Brad would be his "biggest vendetta".
- Cory & Devin: Tension between the two began on Rivals III when the two got into a heated argument at a bar. Their conflict carried on later in the night when they returned to the house, with producers and Devin's teammate Cheyenne eventually stepping in to get Devin to stop antagonizing Cory. They later solidified their rivalry on XXX: Dirty 30 after Cory voted Devin straight to the Redemption House following the first purge, claiming Devin couldn't be trusted.
- Nelson & Shane: Despite aligning with many of the same people, Nelson and Shane have a long history of butting heads, stemming back to Invasion of the Champions. Nelson eventually eliminated Shane in the Underdog Bloodbath, and Shane accused him of tricking his friend Cory in the elimination, causing Cory and Nelson to nearly get into a physical altercation. The two also got into a heated confrontation on Vendettas, though it was only shown in the trailer.

==== Female/male teams ====
- Amanda & Zach: On Invasion of the Champions, Amanda spread a rumor that Zach's then-ex-girlfriend Jenna hooked up with Bruno Bettencourt before Zach arrived. This created tension between Zach and Jenna, who were in the process of rekindling their relationship.
- Ashley & Hunter: Ashley and Hunter had a romantic fling on Invasion of the Champions. Eventually, tensions between the two exploded: Ashley said she was using Hunter to advance in the game, and Hunter called Ashley disposable.
- Britni & Chuck: The two were inseparable on their season of Are You the One?, despite finding out that they were not a perfect match. After the show, the two began a relationship, with Britni moving to Hawaii to be with Chuck. However, Chuck suddenly walked out on Britni prior to her appearance on Vendettas, though she would ultimately rebound with Brad.
- CT & Veronica: On XXX: Dirty 30, before voting her into elimination, CT claimed that Veronica was weak and nobody would want her on their team. Veronica won the elimination round, later secured her team the victory at the next challenge, and sent CT straight to Redemption.
- Da'Vonne & Jozea: Despite being teammates, Da'Vonne orchestrated Jozea's eviction on Big Brother 18 after he admitted to her that he wanted to get rid of all the veteran players. Da'Vonne, who was a returning player, immediately told Head of Household and fellow veteran Nicole Franzel of Jozea's plan, which resulted in her targeting him that week.
- Derrick & Tori: The two first met on Are You The One? Second Chances, though the two were invested in other relationships. However, by the time the two appeared on XXX: Dirty 30, they had begun dating. After Derrick was eliminated, Tori cheated on him with Jordan Wiseley. While discussing their relationship at the reunion, Tori claimed Derrick hacked into her phone, a claim that Derrick denied.
- Joss & Sylvia: On Vendettas, Joss and Sylvia were initially friendly, with a mutual attraction forming between the pair. However, Joss burned a bridge with Sylvia when he and Brad chose to vote her into elimination to save themselves after a challenge in which Sylvia did all the work. Though a remorseful Joss tried to reason with Sylvia that it was purely a gameplay move, Sylvia lashed out, not wanting to hear his explanation.
- Natalie & Paulie: Natalie and Paulie never aligned with each other on Big Brother 18, with Natalie voting to evict Paulie the first week, and Paulie nominated Natalie during his second Head of Household reign. However, tension between the two exploded during the seventh week of the game when Paulie began targeting Natalie after she questioned his intentions with his showmance Zakiyah Everett. Paulie began making numerous derogatory comments towards Natalie, calling her "F.T." (fake tits) in reference to Natalie's breast implants and infamously telling her that, "[she's] about as fake as those things on your chest." Natalie then aligned with Bridgette Dunning and Michelle Meyer to evict Everett from the house, before organizing Paulie's eviction the next week.

==== Female teams ====
- Angela & Faith: Tension between the two began on the first season of Ex on the Beach when Faith went on a date with Angela's love interest Tor'i Brooks. Faith and Tor'i took body shots while on their date, which Tor'i later hid from Angela. At the following elimination ceremony, tensions between the two cliques erupted, as Angela, Tor'i, Cory and Taylor Selfridge attempted to send home Alicia Wright, while the rest of the group wanted to send home Chelsko Thompson. During the ensuing argument, Faith told Angela what really occurred on her date with Tor'i, leading to Angela angrily proclaiming that she wanted to go home.
- Cara Maria & Marie: On XXX: Dirty 30, Cara Maria orchestrated Marie's elimination, claiming that she was untrustworthy. Though they tried to put the past behind them on Vendettas, the two became involved in a love triangle with Kyle, as both girls expressed an attraction towards him. Though Marie got him first, Kyle ultimately left her for Cara Maria.
- Jenna & Jemmye: Jenna saved Jemmye from the first purge on XXX: Dirty 30. A few episodes later, Jemmye pulled the double cross and sent Jenna into elimination against her friend Kailah. A blindsided Jenna lost the elimination round, though she returned after winning the first redemption challenge. At the next challenge, when Jenna was given the opportunity to create the pairings, she chose to pair Jemmye with Ammo in revenge.
- Kailah & Kayleigh: After it was discovered that Kayleigh had kissed Bananas earlier in the season on Vendettas, Kailah, along with Jemmye and Britni, threw Kayleigh's bed and suitcase over a balcony to evict her from the room where Natalie was staying. Kayleigh later quit the game after feeling bullied by the girls.
- Kam & Melissa: On Vendettas, Kam and Melissa got into a heated argument that nearly turned physical, after Kam tried to tell a drunken Melissa about her reputation in the house. An attempt to clear the air the following only led to another argument between the two. After being eliminated, Melissa returned for the final challenge as a mercenary and awarded Kam with a grenade punishment that had ultimately cost her a spot in the Final 4.
  - Kam & Kayleigh: Kam and Kayleigh did not connect on Vendettas and largely avoided getting to know one another.

== Gameplay ==
=== Challenge games ===
- Opening Challenge: Half the cast is buried underground in caskets in a graveyard, and their partners have to dig them out. The partners who are above ground have to use walkie-talkies and the voices of their below-ground partners are disguised, so the digging partner is not sure who their partner is until they are unburied. The buried teammate must instruct their teammate where they are located in the graveyard. The last two teams to dig their partner out are automatically eliminated, while the winning team has to eliminate one additional team.
  - Winners: Amanda & Zach
  - Sent to Redemption: Britni & Chuck, Jemmye & Jenna, Da'Vonne & Jozea
- Wreck Yourself: The competitors' teams are split into two roles: one being a Pusher, and one being the Swinger. The contestants are harnessed on top of a circular platform suspended in midair. The Pusher must push the Swinger off the platform for them to collect rings hanging in the middle of the platform, which they then must hand back to the Pusher. The team that collects the most rings in the shortest amount of time wins.
  - Winners: Brad & Kyle
- Shark Bait: This is a purge challenge where large replicas of steaks with climbing holds, and ropes, are hung over water about 40 feet. Teams must jump from the platform onto the steaks, and from the steaks to ropes, alternating until they get to the other side of the platform. If one of the teammates falls, they are both disqualified and their score only counts how far they made it. The team that gets both members to the other side the fastest wins, and the team that falls soonest is sent to Redemption.
  - Winners: Brad & Kyle
  - Sent to Redemption: CT & Veronica
- Off The Rails: Teams must go in rounds finishing an obstacle course on top of a moving train. First, they must cross the balance beam, by using each other to balance and walk across the single beam. Next, they must walk across a tightrope each while balancing on each other, using lifelines to grab onto as well. If one teammate falls, they both lose. The team to successfully complete the obstacle course the fastest wins.
  - Winners: Amanda & Zach
- Dig Deep: The paired teams are separated into two large groups randomly. The two groups are then put into mine shafts, and must solve 3 puzzles before being able to dig themselves out and race to the finish line. The first paired team to finish within the large team that finishes first, wins.
  - Winners: Kam & Kayleigh
- Don't Push Me Around: The paired teams are separated into two large teams and must play a game of rugby. The girls may only take girls and guys may only tackle guys on the opposing team. Players must retrieve the ball from their opponents end zone, and fight through an obstacle course in order to return it to their own end zone and score a point. The first team to score two points wins, and they then select the pair within the team that was the MVP.
  - Winners: Amanda & Zach
- Dunking for Dinner: This challenge is played in two phases. The first phase, one member of the team must be dunked into water by a crane with their arms tied, while the other player controls the crane. Players must move disks from one circle to the other in an allotted amount of time. The number of disks transferred corresponds to the number of dishes the team is allowed to eat. In the second phase, the player that controlled the crane now must eat as many dishes as possible. The team that eats the most dishes in 15 minutes wins, while the team that eats the least is purged straight to Redemption.
  - Winners: Ashley & Hunter
  - Sent to Redemption: Kam & Kayleigh
- Sky Bridge: Teams are lifted into the sky via a giant crane. There is a partially completed bridge that they must complete and crawl over by passing rope from side to side and tying knots. The team to complete their bridge and make it to the other side fastest wins.
  - Winners: Bananas & Tony
- Caged In: One player will be inside of a cage and the other on the outside. When TJ says go, the players who are outside of the cage must run to a tree line, pick up a tool, and cut down branches. Players will bring the branches back and throw the branches inside the cage. The person inside the cage must use twine and the branches to make a makeshift pole tall enough to reach the keys to the cage. Once unlocked, the teams must run across a field and solve a puzzle. The first team that solves the puzzle wins. The last place team will get a significant disadvantage at the next challenge.
  - Winners: Amanda & Zach
- What Goes Up, Must Come Down: Teams must race up flights of stairs to the roof of a 200-foot tower. At the top, one member will be suspended on the side of the tower and look down at the answer key to a puzzle. They must communicate to their partner how to assemble the puzzle. Once the puzzle has been correctly assembled, both players must repel down the tower to the ground. The team with the fastest time wins. For finishing last in the "Caged In" challenge, Cara Maria & Marie had to find the correct key from a key-chain to unlock the gates to the tower before proceeding, while the gate began unlocked for all other teams.
  - Winners: Bananas & Tony
- Hit List: Teams begin on the edge of a plank suspended above water. One at a time, teams are asked a trivia question regarding The Challenge trilogy. If they answer correctly, they can assign a strike to another team while answering incorrectly earns their own team a strike. Once a team earns three strikes, a battering ram knock them into the water. The last team remaining wins.
  - Winners: Natalie & Paulie
- Heads Will Roll: Teams begin on opposite platforms above ground. In between the two platforms is a rotating log which players must run over while carrying a flag to transfer the flag to their teammate. The team with the most flags transferred wins, while the team that transfers the least flags is purged straight to Redemption. In the event that multiple teams are unable to collect flags, the losing team is determined based on distance travelled across the log.
  - Winners: Natalie & Paulie
  - Sent to Redemption: Nelson & Shane
- Rolling Thunder: Each team has a giant boulder which they must roll to the finish line. Halfway through the course, there is a ditch where teams have two routes they can choose from. The first team to reach the finish line wins, while the last team to reach the finish line is eliminated.
  - Winners: Joss & Sylvia
  - Eliminated: Kam & Kayleigh
- Painfully Wrong: All teams begin at the start of five zones, in between each zone is a 7000-volt copper curtain. One at a time, teams are asked a trivia question. If they answer correctly, they can force another team to advance through the copper curtain to the next zone. Once a team reaches the fifth and final zone, they are out of the challenge. The last team remaining wins.
  - Winners: Joss & Sylvia

=== Armageddon games ===
- Think Outside the Box: One teammate is tethered to the center of the arena and attached to a resistance band while the other is inside a cage with a hole in the ceiling. The tethered teammate must run and retrieve large puzzle pieces that fit together to form a cube and give them to their teammate in the cage. The teammate in the cage must assemble the puzzle in order to climb out of the cage. The first team to successfully have their teammate escape the cage wins.
  - Played By: Natalie & Paulie vs. Kam & Kayleigh
- Ramp It Up: Each team starts on separate ramps. Each player must race up their opponents ramp to collect a single ball. Once collecting a ball they must race back to the top of their ramp and deposit the ball into a cylinder tube. The first team to collect 7 balls wins.
  - Played By: Derrick & Tori vs. Joss & Sylvia
- No Slack: Teams are tethered together in a box, separated by three walls each. Each player must smash through a plaster hole in each wall until both players are able to escape through the six walls. The first team to break through the six walls and escape the box wins.
  - Played by: Angela & Faith vs. Ashley & Hunter
- Think Tank: One player hangs from a rope system by their ankles over a water tank where a puzzle key is located at the bottom. The other player climbs a ladder to give their partner enough slack to dive underwater and read the puzzle key which they relay to the climber to solve a puzzle. The first team to complete the puzzle wins. If neither team is able to complete the puzzle in the allotted time, whichever team has the most correct answers would win.
  - Played by: Da'Vonne & Jozea vs. Kam & Kayleigh
- Tread Lightly: Players have to balance a ball between two sticks, then run across a stage with two treadmills going in opposite directions, and deposit their ball into a bin. The first team to deposit ten balls into their bin wins.
  - Played by: Nelson & Shane vs. Brad & Kyle
- Shake It Off: Both teams must shake off medallions hanging from a rope by jumping off a platform, grabbing the rope, and letting it go so that it shakes until all the medallions are off. The first team to shake off all nine medallions from their rope wins.
  - Played by: Amanda & Zach vs. Cory & Devin, Da'Vonne & Jozea vs. Cory & Devin
- Meet Me Halfway: Both players on each team will start at opposite ends of a maze. Carrying a key to a lock, each player must crash through dry walls in the maze until the reach the center where they then must unlock a box, retrieve the contents and ring their nearest team bell. The first team to ring their bell with the contents of their box wins.
  - Played by: Cara Maria & Marie vs. Nelson & Shane
- Don't Trip Me Up: One member of the team must dive under a water tank to untie tiles so that both team members can build a house of cards on a floating platform to a designated marker. The first team to build their tower wins.
  - Played by: Bananas & Tony vs. Joss & Sylvia
- Milk and Cookies: One team member would stand on a perch, both arms above their head with their wrists tethered to a bucket of mursik milk. The other team member would be eating cookies and Mursik milk. If the player on the perch falls off, their partner must stop eating cookies. If both team members eating finish their cookies and milk, then the elimination comes down to the perched players in a battle of endurance. The first team to either eat the most cookies or stand on the perch the longest, wins.
  - Played by: Bananas & Tony vs. Natalie & Paulie

=== Apocalypse games ===
- Balls to the Wall: Players are placed in separate cages with a sludge hammer for each partner sticking out of the walls. Each teammate must break the sledgehammer through the wall before proceeding to break a block of ice that blocks their escape. The first team to successfully escape the cage by breaking the ice wins.
  - Played By: Da'Vonne & Jozea vs. Natalie & Paulie
- Pyramid Schemers: One team tries to solve two same-colored puzzles on a rotating pyramid in under three minutes. After three minutes, the next team tries to solve their respective puzzle. The first team to finish both of their puzzles first wins. If the first team completes their puzzle, the second team has a limited amount of time to complete their puzzle or they lose.
  - Played By: Da'Vonne & Jozea vs. Natalie & Paulie
- That's The Ticket: One player is stationed in a giant sphere filled with numbered, multi-colored balls. Their goal is to collect their team's five numbers while the partner from the opposing team rotates a crank that spins the wheel. Whoever deposits the correct five balls first wins.
  - Played By: Cara Maria & Marie vs. Kam & Kayleigh, Brad & Kyle vs. Natalie & Paulie
- I Got You Pegged: Both teams must place 16 numbered pegs on their respective climbing wall, with one person climbing and the other distributing the pegs. The numbers on the blue pegs are additioned to the total and the numbers on the red pegs are subtracted from the total, the goal is reaching the number 32. The first team to have the right answer and ring the bell wins.
  - Played By: Brad & Kyle vs. Kam & Kayleigh
- King of the Ring: Both teams start on one end of a battering ram. On go, the teams must push, pull, or drag the other team to get them out of the ring to gain one point. The first team that gets 3 points wins.
  - Played By: Bananas & Tony vs. Nelson & Shane

=== Final Challenge ===
Prior to the final challenge, it is announced that the top player from the winning team would make the ultimate decision whether to keep the one million dollars for themselves or split the money with their partner. Each team also receives a grenade which they can use against another team, penalising them with a disadvantage during any checkpoint during the final. The final starts with players climbing out of a helicopter, down a ladder to the ground. Players must then complete a series of timed checkpoints.

Checkpoints

- Vengeance Run: Players complete a four-kilometre run down a flat road.
- Final Stand: Pairs stand on together on top of a tower with a narrow foothold. The first, second and third teams to fall off receive a ten, five and two-and-a-half-minute time penalty respectively added to their pair's total time. The last team to fall off receives no time penalty.
  - Grenade: Both members must wear weighted vests while completing the checkpoint. (Unused)
- Breakfast of Champions: Pairs must eat 32 plates of food containing delicacies from countries visited during the Challenge trilogy. The first team to eat all 32 plates wins the checkpoint and have their time stopped. Each remaining plate not consumed from the other three teams counts as a one-minute penalty towards that team.
  - Grenade: Both members must drink one "Amasi Fish Milkshake" before proceeding with the checkpoint. (Used by Ashley & Hunter on Joss & Sylvia)
- Savana Sprint: Players complete a three-kilometre run through the jungle to the Sudwala Caves.
  - Grenade: Pairs are given a ten-minute time penalty added to their total time. (Used by Joss & Sylvia on Ashley & Hunter)
- Final Reckoning: Players must walk over burning coals to reach the finish line.
  - Grenade: Both team members begin with their ankles chained and locked. They must unlock themselves by finding a key on a key-chain with 32 keys on it before proceeding. (Used by Natalie & Paulie on Joss & Sylvia)

Results

- Winners: Ashley & Hunter (69 minutes 3 seconds)
  - (Ashley was the top performing individual player between her and Hunter and thus she was awarded the 'Million Dollar Dilemma'. She chose to take the $1,000,000 prize all for herself, leaving Hunter with nothing)
- Runners-up: Joss & Sylvia (69 minutes 43 seconds)
- Third place: Natalie & Paulie (71 minutes 33 seconds)
- Fourth place: Cara Maria & Marie (104 minutes 28 seconds)

== Game summary ==
Episode		Winners	Armageddon teams		Armageddon game	Armageddon outcome	
#	Challenge	Winners	Voted In	Called Out	Armageddon game	Winners	Eliminated
1	Opening Challenge	Amanda & Zach	—N/a				Britni & Chuck
1	Opening Challenge	Amanda & Zach	—N/a				Jemmye & Jenna
1	Opening Challenge	Amanda & Zach	—N/a				Da'Vonne & Jozea
2/3	Wreck Yourself	Brad & Kyle	Natalie & Paulie	Kam & Kayleigh	Think Outside the Box	Kam & Kayleigh	Natalie & Paulie
5	Shark Bait	Brad & Kyle	—N/a				CT & Veronica
6/7	Off The Rails	Amanda & Zach	Derrick & Tori	Joss & Sylvia	Ramp It Up	Joss & Sylvia	Derrick & Tori
7/8	Dig Deep	Kam & Kayleigh	Angela & Faith	—N/a	No Slack	Ashley & Hunter	Angela & Faith
8/9	Don't Push Me Around	Amanda & Zach	Da'Vonne & Jozea	Kam & Kayleigh	Think Tank	Kam & Kayleigh	Da'Vonne & Jozea
10/11	Dunking for Dinner	Ashley & Hunter	—N/a				Kam & Kayleigh
11/12	Sky Bridge	Bananas & Tony	Nelson & Shane	Brad & Kyle	Tread Lightly	Nelson & Shane	Brad & Kyle
12/13	Caged In	Amanda & Zach	Amanda & Zach (Note: Amanda & Zach won the "Caged In" challenge and earned safety from the Armageddon. However, after they were unable to decide on their vote to break a tie between Ashley & Hunter and Bananas & Tony, Amanda & Zach were automatically sent in to elimination. As no one voted for them, they were allowed to select any team to compete against in the Armageddon. They chose Da'Vonne & Jozea.)	Da'Vonne & Jozea	Shake It Off	Cory & Devin (Note: Cory & Devin arrived in the game as Mercenaries. As they arrived so late into the season, Cory & Devin were required to defeat both Amanda & Zach and Da'Vonne & Jozea in the Armageddon in order to enter the game as players. Losing against either team would have sent them to the Redemption House.)	Amanda & Zach
12/13	Caged In	Amanda & Zach	Amanda & Zach	Da'Vonne & Jozea	Shake It Off	Cory & Devin	Da'Vonne & Jozea
14/15	What Goes Up, Must Come Down	Bananas & Tony	Cara Maria & Marie	Nelson & Shane	Meet Me Halfway	Nelson & Shane	Cara Maria & Marie
16/17	Hit List	Natalie & Paulie	Bananas & Tony	Joss & Sylvia	Don't Trip Me Up	Joss & Sylvia	Bananas & Tony
17	Heads Will Roll	Natalie & Paulie	—N/a				Nelson & Shane
18	Rolling Thunder	Joss & Sylvia	—N/a				Kam & Kayleigh
19	Painfully Wrong	Joss & Sylvia	Bananas & Tony	Natalie & Paulie	Milk and Cookies	Natalie & Paulie	Bananas & Tony
20	Final Challenge	Ashley & Hunter	2nd place: Joss & Sylvia; 3rd place: Natalie & Paulie; 4th place: Cara Maria & Marie				

=== Elimination progress ===
Teams	Episode														
Teams	1 (Note: Episode 1 started with a purge challenge with the last two teams getting sent to the redemption house. Jemmye & Jenna and Britni & Chuck got last place and were eliminated. The challenge winners, Amanda & Zach, then had to eliminate one additional team. They chose Da'Vonne & Jozea to be eliminated. All three teams were sent to the Redemption House.)	2/3	5	6/7	7/8	8/9	10/11	11/12	12/13	14/15	16/17	17	18	19	Finale
Ashley & Hunter	—N/a				MERC	RISK	WON	RISK	RISK	RISK	RISK	SAFE	SAFE	SAFE	WINNERS
Joss & Sylvia	SAFE	RISK	SAFE	ELIM	SAFE	RISK	SAFE	RISK	RISK	RISK	ELIM	SAFE	WON	WIN	SECOND
Natalie & Paulie	SAFE	OUT									WIN	WON	SAFE	ELIM	THIRD
Cara Maria & Marie	SAFE	SAFE	SAFE	SAFE	SAFE	RISK	SAFE	RISK	RISK	OUT	SAFE	SAFE	SAFE	SAFE	FOURTH
Bananas & Tony	—N/a	SAFE	SAFE	SAFE	SAFE	RISK	SAFE	WIN	RISK	WIN	OUT		SAFE	OUT	
Kam & Kayleigh	—N/a	ELIM	SAFE	SAFE	WIN	ELIM	LAST						LAST		
Nelson & Shane	SAFE	SAFE	SAFE	SAFE	SAFE	RISK	SAFE	ELIM	RISK	ELIM	RISK	LAST			
Cory & Devin	—N/a								MERC	RISK	DQ				
Da'Vonne & Jozea	LAST		SAFE	SAFE	RISK	OUT	SAFE	RISK	OUT						
Amanda & Zach	WIN	RISK	SAFE	WIN	SAFE	WIN	SAFE	RISK	LOST						
Brad & Kyle	SAFE	WIN	WON	RISK	SAFE	RISK	SAFE	OUT							
Angela & Faith	SAFE	SAFE	SAFE	RISK	OUT										
Derrick & Tori	SAFE	SAFE	SAFE	OUT											
CT & Veronica	SAFE	SAFE	LAST												
Kailah & ~~Kayleigh~~	DQ														
~~Kam~~ & Melissa	DQ														
Britni & Chuck	LAST														
Jemmye & Jenna	LAST														

Competition
The team won the final challenge
The team did not win the final challenge and did not receive any money
The team won the challenge and was immune from the Armageddon
The team won the challenge and an advantage for the next challenge
The team did not nominate the team voted into the Armageddon and was not eligible to be picked for the Armageddon
The team was eligible to be picked for the Armageddon, but was not selected
The team won in the Armageddon
The Mercenaries won Armageddon and entered the game
The team lost in the Armageddon and was eliminated
The team won the challenge, but could not decide their vote and was automatically sent to the Armageddon, and lost
The team was eliminated at the challenge site
The team was disqualified from the competition due to disciplinary reasons

== Teams ==
Dig Deep (Ep. 7)
Blue Team	Green Team
Angela & Faith	Amanda & Zach
Bananas & Tony	Brad & Kyle
Cara Maria & Marie	Joss & Sylvia
Da'Vonne & Jozea	Kam & Kayleigh
	Nelson & Shane

Don't Push Me Around (Ep. 8)
Orange Team	Yellow Team
Amanda & Zach	Bananas & Tony
Ashley & Hunter	Da'Vonne & Jozea
Brad & Kyle	Joss & Sylvia
Cara Maria & Marie	Nelson & Shane
Kam & Kayleigh	

== Redemption house ==
=== Redemption chart ===
	Four Horseman of the Apocalypse		Eliminated teams	Apocalypse	Apocalypse outcome	
#	XX Holder	XX's Pick	Eliminated teams	Apocalypse	Winners	Losers
4	Natalie & Paulie	Da'Vonne & Jozea	Britni & Chuck	Balls to the Wall	Da'Vonne & Jozea	Natalie & Paulie
4	Natalie & Paulie	Da'Vonne & Jozea	Jemmye & Jenna	Balls to the Wall	Da'Vonne & Jozea	Natalie & Paulie
10	Da'Vonne & Jozea	Natalie & Paulie	CT & Veronica	Pyramid Schemers	Da'Vonne & Jozea	Natalie & Paulie
10	Da'Vonne & Jozea	Natalie & Paulie	Derrick & Tori	Pyramid Schemers	Da'Vonne & Jozea	Natalie & Paulie
10	Da'Vonne & Jozea	Natalie & Paulie	Angela & Faith	Pyramid Schemers	Da'Vonne & Jozea	Natalie & Paulie
15	Kam & Kayleigh	Cara Maria & Marie	Da'Vonne & Jozea	That's The Ticket	Cara Maria & Marie	Kam & Kayleigh
15	Brad & Kyle	Natalie & Paulie	Da'Vonne & Jozea	That's The Ticket	Natalie & Paulie	Brad & Kyle
18	Brad & Kyle	Kam & Kayleigh	—N/a	I Got You Pegged	Kam & Kayleigh	Brad & Kyle
18	Brad & Kyle	Kam & Kayleigh	—N/a	King of the Ring	Bananas & Tony	Nelson & Shane

=== Redemption progress ===
Teams	Episode							
Teams	4		10		15		18	
Bananas & Tony	—N/a						SAFE	WON
Kam & Kayleigh	—N/a				XX	LOSE	SAFE	WON
Nelson & Shane	—N/a						SAFE	LOSS
Brad & Kyle	—N/a				XX	LOSE	XX	LOSS
Natalie & Paulie	XX	LOSE	SAFE	LOSE	SAFE	WON		
Cara Maria & Marie	—N/a				SAFE	WON		
Da'Vonne & Jozea	SAFE	WON	XX	WON	OUT			
Amanda & Zach	—N/a				MED			
Angela & Faith	—N/a		OUT					
Derrick & Tori	—N/a		OUT					
CT & Veronica	—N/a		OUT					
Britni & Chuck	OUT							
Jemmye & Jenna	OUT							

Competition
The team won the Redemption elimination, and returned to the main game
The team pulled the XX card and chose their opponent for the Apocalypse
The team was selected by the XX Holder and competed in the Apocalypse
The team lost the Redemption elimination, and remained in the Redemption House
The team lost the Redemption competition, and was permanently eliminated from the competition
The team was not picked in the Double Cross and was permanently eliminated from the competition
A contestant was removed from the competition due to injury, so his/her partner was also eliminated

== Voting progress ==
Voted into Armageddon	**Da'Vonne & Jozea**; 1 vote to eliminate	**Natalie & Paulie**; 5 of 12 votes	**Derrick & Tori**; 3 of 11 votes	**Angela & Faith**; 3 of 10 votes	Tie Vote	**Da'Vonne & Jozea**; 1 of 1 vote	Tie Vote	**Nelson & Shane**; 1 of 1 vote	**Amanda & Zach** automatically sent in	**Cara Maria & Marie**; 4 of 7 votes	**Bananas & Tony**; 3 of 7 votes	**Bananas & Tony**; 3 of 6 votes
Called Out	**Da'Vonne & Jozea**; 1 vote to eliminate	**Kam & Kayleigh**; 1 of 1 vote	**Joss & Sylvia**; 1 of 1 vote	—N/a	Tie Vote	**Kam & Kayleigh**; 1 of 1 vote	Tie Vote	**Brad & Kyle**; 1 of 1 vote	**Da'Vonne & Jozea**; 1 of 1 vote	**Nelson & Shane**; 1 of 1 vote	**Joss & Sylvia**; 1 of 1 vote	**Natalie & Paulie**; 1 of 1 vote
Voter	Episode											
Voter	1	2/3	6/7	7/8	8/9		11/12		12/13	14	17	19
Ashley & Hunter	—N/a				Kam & Kayleigh		Da'Vonne & Jozea		Bananas & Tony	Cara Maria & Marie	Bananas & Tony	Cara Maria & Marie
Joss & Sylvia		Natalie & Paulie	Derrick & Tori	Brad & Kyle	Brad & Kyle		Da'Vonne & Jozea		Bananas & Tony	Cara Maria & Marie	Bananas & Tony	**Bananas & Tony**
Natalie & Paulie		Joss & Sylvia									**Joss & Sylvia**	Bananas & Tony
Cara Maria & Marie		Angela & Faith	Brad & Kyle	Nelson & Shane	Nelson & Shane		Joss & Sylvia		Ashley & Hunter	—N/a	Nelson & Shane	Natalie & Paulie
Bananas & Tony	—N/a	Nelson & Shane	—N/a	Amanda & Zach	Kam & Kayleigh		**Nelson & Shane**	Nelson & Shane	Ashley & Hunter	**Ashley & Hunter**	Ashley & Hunter	Ashley & Hunter
Kam & Kayleigh	—N/a	Natalie & Paulie	—N/a	**Angela & Faith**	Ashley & Hunter							
Nelson & Shane		Angela & Faith	Angela & Faith	Cara Maria & Marie	Cara Maria & Marie		Cara Maria & Marie		Bananas & Tony	Cara Maria & Marie	Bananas & Tony	
Cory & Devin	—N/a									Cara Maria & Marie		
Da'Vonne & Jozea			Kam & Kayleigh	Angela & Faith	Joss & Sylvia		Amanda & Zach		Ashley & Hunter			
Amanda & Zach	**Da'Vonne & Jozea**	Natalie & Paulie	**Da'Vonne & Jozea**	Bananas & Tony	**Da'Vonne & Jozea**	Da'Vonne & Jozea	Brad & Kyle		**Da'Vonne & Jozea**			
Brad & Kyle		**Natalie & Paulie**	Derrick & Tori	Joss & Sylvia	Joss & Sylvia		Amanda & Zach					
Angela & Faith		Nelson & Shane	Derrick & Tori	Da'Vonne & Jozea								
Derrick & Tori		Angela & Faith	Angela & Faith									
CT & Veronica		Angela & Faith										
Kailah												
Melissa												
Britni & Chuck												
Jemmye & Jenna												

Bold indicates the winner of that week's challenge, earning them the Power Vote, so their vote against a team counts twice.

== Episodes ==
No. overall	No. in season	Title	Original release date	US viewers (millions)
402	1	"Six Feet Under"	July 10, 2018	0.84
403	2	"The Young and the Wreckless"	July 17, 2018	0.82
404	3	"Crazy Ex-Girlfriend"	July 24, 2018	0.85
405	4	"The Affair"	July 31, 2018	0.73
406	5	"Breaking Brad"	August 7, 2018	0.65
407	6	"A Series of Unfortunate Events"	August 14, 2018	0.75
408	7	"Big Little Lies"	August 21, 2018	0.84
409	8	"Shaneless"	August 28, 2018	0.75
410	9	"Bro-ing Pains"	September 4, 2018	0.76
411	10	"Redemption House of Cards"	September 11, 2018	0.72
412	11	"You're The Worst"	September 18, 2018	0.81
413	12	"Unhappy Days"	September 25, 2018	0.71
414	13	"The People vs. Johnny Bananas"	October 2, 2018	0.63
415	14	"Lavender Is the New Black"	October 9, 2018	0.75
416	15	"Wheel of Fortune"	October 16, 2018	0.62
417	16	"The Leftovers"	October 23, 2018	0.76
418	17	"Scandal"	October 30, 2018	0.79
419	18	"It's Always Sunny in South Africa"	November 6, 2018	0.67
420	19	"The Walking Dead"	November 13, 2018	0.83
421	20	"Who Wants to Be a Millionaire?"	November 20, 2018	0.74

=== Reunion special ===
The two-part reunion special aired on November 27 and December 4, 2018, and was hosted by WWE pro wrestler, Dolph Ziggler. Cast members (including Britni, Kayleigh and Kyle via Satellite) attended at the MTV Studios in New York City.
