= Johnny Devenanzio =

American television personality

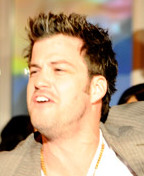
- Devenanzio in 2008
- Born: John Amadeus Devenanzio; June 22, 1982 (age 44); Fullerton, California, U.S.
- Other name: Johnny Bananas
- Education: Pennsylvania State University (BS)
- Occupation: Reality television personality

John Amadeus Devenanzio (born June 22, 1982), better known as Johnny Bananas, is an American television personality, best known as a competitor on the MTV reality competition show The Challenge. His first television appearance was on the seventeenth season of The Real World in 2006. In 2018, he became the host of 1st Look on NBC, and he hosted it until 2023.

== Television appearances ==
=== The Challenge ===
Devenanzio is the most decorated and one of the most infamous contestants on The Challenge. He is known for a multitude of infamous moments on The Challenge such as keeping the $275,000 earnings from winning partner, Sarah Rice, after she voted him into an elimination battle on a previous season, in Rivals 3 and being hoisted on the back of Chris "CT" Tamburello during an elimination in Cutthroat. As of 2026, he has won the most seasons of The Challenge with eight seasons and has earned the second highest amount of prize money of all contestants on the competition show accumulating $1,357,720. He also holds the record for the most seasons participated in with twenty-four seasons. He has also competed in spin-offs of The Challenge such as Champs vs. Pros, Champs vs. Stars and World Championship, and in the second season of The Challenge: USA.

== Personal life ==
After filming for the thirty-third season of The Challenge had completed, Devenanzio started dating teammate and castmate and Big Brother: Over the Top winner Morgan Willett. The couple split in September 2021 after Willett claimed Devenanzio was unfaithful. Devenanzio was previously in a relationship with Olympic champion Hannah Teter.

== Filmography ==
=== Television ===
Year	Title	Network	Role	Notes
2006	The Real World: Key West	MTV	Himself	Season 17 (26 episodes, including reunion special)
2006	Real World/Road Rules Challenge: The Duel	MTV	Contestant	Eliminated (1 episode)
2007	Real World/Road Rules Challenge: The Inferno 3	MTV	Contestant	Runner-up (17 episodes)
2008	Real World/Road Rules Challenge: The Gauntlet III	MTV	Contestant	Eliminated (3 episodes)
2008	Real World Awards Bash	MTV	Himself	Won Hottest Male award
2008	Real World/Road Rules Challenge: The Island	MTV	Contestant	Winner (9 episodes)
2009	Real World/Road Rules Challenge: The Ruins	MTV	Contestant	Winner (12 episodes)
2010	The Challenge: Cutthroat	MTV	Contestant	Eliminated (10 episodes, including 2 reunion special episodes)
2011	The Challenge: Rivals	MTV	Contestant	Winner (12 episodes)
2012	The Challenge: Battle of the Exes	MTV	Contestant	Winner (13 episodes)
2013	The Challenge: Rivals II	MTV	Contestant	Runner-up (15 episodes)
2014	The Challenge: Free Agents	MTV	Contestant	Winner (13 episodes)
2014–2019	The Challenge: After Show	MTV	Himself	Guest (12 episodes)
2015	The Challenge: Battle of the Exes II	MTV	Contestant	Eliminated (15 episodes, including 4 reunion special episodes)
2015–2016	The Challenge: Battle of the Bloodlines	MTV	Contestant	Eliminated (14 episodes, including 3 reunion special episodes)
2016	Robot Chicken	Adult Swim	Himself	Guest, voice only (1 episode)
2016	The Challenge: Rivals III	MTV	Contestant	Winner (15 episodes)
2017	The Challenge: Invasion of the Champions	MTV	Contestant	Eliminated (7 episodes, including reunion special)
2017	The Challenge: Champs vs. Pros	MTV	Contestant	Eliminated (2 episodes, raised $1,000 for the Special Olympics)
2017	The Challenge XXX: Dirty 30	MTV	Contestant	Eliminated (16 episodes, including 2 reunion special episodes)
2017	Fear Factor	MTV	Contestant	Winner (1 episode)
2017	The Tonight Show Starring Jimmy Fallon	NBC	Himself	Guest (1 episode)
2017	American Dad!	TBS	Johnny Bananas	Guest, voice only (1 episode)
2017–2018	The Challenge: Champs vs. Stars	MTV	Contestant	Winner (8 episodes, raised $50,000 for the Special Olympics)
2018	The Challenge: Vendettas	MTV	Contestant	Eliminated (12 episodes, including 2 reunion special episodes)
2018	Ex on the Beach	MTV	Himself	Co-host, launch special (1 episode)
2018	The Challenge: Final Reckoning	MTV	Contestant	Eliminated (21 episodes, including 2 reunion special episodes)
2018	UFO Seekers		Himself	Guest (1 episode)
2018-2019	Celebrity Page		Himself	Guest (2 episodes)
2018-2023	1st Look	NBC	Host	All episodes
2019	The Challenge: War of the Worlds	MTV	Contestant	Eliminated (5 episodes, including 2 reunion special episodes)
2019	The Challenge: War of the Worlds 2	MTV	Contestant	Eliminated (7 episodes, including 2 reunion special episodes)
2020	Ridiculousness	MTV	Himself	Guest (1 episode)
2020	Worst Cooks in America	Food Network	Contestant	Season 19 Runner-up (6 episodes)
2020	The Challenge: Total Madness	MTV	Contestant	Winner (18 episodes)
2021	Celebrity Sleepover		Host	4 episodes
2022–2023	The Challenge: Ride or Dies	MTV	Contestant	Runner-up (21 episodes)
2023	The Challenge: World Championship	Paramount+	Contestant	Eliminated (7 episodes)
2023	The Challenge: USA 2	CBS	Contestant	Finalist (14 episodes)
2023	House of Villains	E!	Contestant	Runner-up (10 episodes)
2024	The Traitors	Peacock	Contestant	Season 2 Faithful (2 episodes)
2024–2025	The Challenge 40: Battle of the Eras	MTV	Contestant	Finalist (21 episodes)
2025	Pop the Balloon Live	Netflix	Himself	Dating series
2025	The Challenge: Vets & New Threats	MTV	Contestant	Eliminated (4 episodes)
2026	Chef Grudge Match	Food Network	Contestant	Loser
2026	The Challenge: Cutthroat	Paramount+	Contestant	Winner (14 episodes)

=== Film ===
Year	Title	Role
2018	The Head Thieves	Rex Flex
2019	Jay and Silent Bob Reboot	Guy with Banana
