= Are You the One? season 1 =

American reality television program

Are You the One?
- Season 1
- Presented by: Ryan Devlin
- No. of contestants: 20
- Location: Kauaʻi, Hawaii
- No. of episodes: 10

Release
- Original network: MTV
- Original release: January 21 – March 25, 2014

Season chronology
- Next → Season 2

The first season of MTV's reality dating series Are You the One?, filmed in Kauaʻi, Hawaii, premiered on MTV on January 21, 2014.

== Cast ==
Male cast members	Age	Hometown
Adam Kuhn	24	Sterling, Virginia
Dre McCoy	23	Atlanta, Georgia
Chris Scali	24	Brooklyn, New York
Chris Tolleson	23	Virginia Beach
Dillan Ostrom	23	Finley, North Dakota
Ethan Diamond	23	Denver, Colorado
Joey Dillon	23	Atlanta, Georgia
John Jacobs	25	Washington, D.C.
Ryan Malaty	24	Greeley, Colorado
Wes Buckles	25	Phoenix, Arizona

Female cast members	Age	Hometown
Amber Lee	22	Austin, Texas
Ashleigh Feaster	23	Akron, Ohio
Brittany Baldassari	24	Boston, Massachusetts
Coleysia Chestnut	23	Selma, Alabama
Jacy Rodriguez	24	Carolina, Puerto Rico
Jessica Perez	23	Miami, Florida
Kayla Lusby	22	Greenfield, Tennessee
Paige Brendel	22	Phoenix, Arizona
Shanley McIntee	24	Mishawaka, Indiana
Simone Kelly	23	Atlanta, Georgia

== Progress ==
Guys	Ceremony								
Guys	1	2	3	4	5	6	7	8	9
Adam	Brittany	Shanley	Brittany	Amber	Shanley	Ashleigh	Shanley	Shanley	Shanley
Chris S.	Ashleigh	Simone	Paige	Paige	Simone	Brittany	Jacy	Ashleigh	Jacy
Chris T.	Jessica	Paige	Simone	Ashleigh	Paige	Paige	Paige	Paige	Paige
Dillan	Coleysia	Jessica	Coleysia	Coleysia	Coleysia	Coleysia	Coleysia	Coleysia	Coleysia
Dre	Jacy	Ashleigh	Ashleigh	Simone	Brittany	Shanley	Simone	Simone	Simone
Ethan	Shanley	Amber	Amber	Kayla	Amber	Amber	Amber	Amber	Amber
John	Simone	Jacy	Jessica	Shanley	Jacy	Jacy	Brittany	Jacy	Ashleigh
Joey	Paige	Brittany	Shanley	Jacy	Jessica	Simone	Jessica	Brittany	Brittany
Ryan	Amber	Kayla	Kayla	Brittany	Ashleigh	Jessica	Ashleigh	Jessica	Jessica
Wes	Kayla	Coleysia	Jacy	Jessica	Kayla	Kayla	Kayla	Kayla	Kayla
Correct matches	2	4	2	2	5	5	7	8	10

Girls	Ceremony								
Girls	1	2	3	4	5	6	7	8	9
Amber	Ryan	Ethan	Ethan	Adam	Ethan	Ethan	Ethan	Ethan	Ethan
Ashleigh	Chris S.	Dre	Dre	Chris T.	Ryan	Adam	Ryan	Chris S.	John
Brittany	Adam	Joey	Adam	Ryan	Dre	Chris S.	John	Joey	Joey
Coleysia	Dillan	Wes	Dillan	Dillan	Dillan	Dillan	Dillan	Dillan	Dillan
Jacy	Dre	John	Wes	Joey	John	John	Chris S.	John	Chris S.
Jessica	Chris T.	Dillan	John	Wes	Joey	Ryan	Joey	Ryan	Ryan
Kayla	Wes	Ryan	Ryan	Ethan	Wes	Wes	Wes	Wes	Wes
Paige	Joey	Chris T.	Chris S.	Chris S.	Chris T.	Chris T.	Chris T.	Chris T.	Chris T.
Shanley	Ethan	Adam	Joey	John	Adam	Dre	Adam	Adam	Adam
Simone	John	Chris S.	Chris T.	Dre	Chris S.	Joey	Dre	Dre	Dre
Correct matches	2	4	2	2	5	5	7	8	10

Notes

- Name Unconfirmed perfect match
- Name Confirmed perfect match

=== Truth Booths ===
Couple	Episode	Result
Chris T. & Shanley	1	Not A Match
Ethan & Jessica	2	Not A Match
John & Simone	3	Not A Match
Dillan & Jessica	4	Not A Match
Dre & Ashleigh	5	Not A Match
Dillan & Coleysia	5	Perfect Match
Chris T. & Paige	6	Perfect Match
Ryan & Kayla	7	Not A Match
Wes & Kayla	8	Perfect Match
John & Jacy	9	Not A Match

=== MTV.com clues ===
Clue	Perfect match
1	Ethan & Amber
2	Brittany & Joey

== Episodes ==
No. overall	No. in season	Title	Original release date	U.S. viewers (millions)
1	1	"You Can't Handle the Truth"	January 21, 2014	N/A
2	2	"The Temptation of Chris T"	January 28, 2014	N/A
3	3	"A Real "G""	February 4, 2014	N/A
4	4	"Karma's a Bitch"	February 11, 2014	N/A
5	5	"Double Shot"	February 18, 2014	N/A
Perfect Match #1: Coleysia & Dillan
6	6	"Turn the Paige"	February 25, 2014	N/A
Perfect Match #2: Paige & Chris T
7	7	"It's So Hard... to Say Goodbye"	March 4, 2014	N/A
8	8	"Getting Dumped On"	March 11, 2014	N/A
9	9	"White Party"	March 18, 2014	N/A
Perfect Match #3: Kayla & Wes
10	10	"Run Down with a Happy Ending"	March 25, 2014	N/A

== After filming ==
=== Baby Special and Reunion ===
Baby Special and Reunion aired on September 29, 2014. During this reunion, the gender of Ethan and Amber's baby was revealed to be a girl. There were also conflicts between Scali and Jacy, Shanley and Chris T, and Ryan and Adam. The end of the episode resulted in most conflicts being resolved. Jacy stated that she would be moving to New York (where Scali was based at the time) and they would take their relationship from there. Brittany told the camera that she would be taking Ryan home to meet her parents.

Shanley McIntee appeared on the first season of the American version of Ex on the Beach.

=== The Challenge ===
Cast member	Seasons of The Challenge
Adam Kuhn	Battle of the Exes II
Brittany Baldassari	Battle of the Exes II
John "JJ" Jacobs	Battle of the Exes II
Simone Kelly	Battle of the Exes II, Rivals III, XXX: Dirty 30
