= Are You the One? season 3 =

American reality television program

Are You the One?
- Season 3
- Presented by: Ryan Devlin
- No. of contestants: 20
- Location: Kona, Hawaii
- No. of episodes: 10

Release
- Original network: MTV
- Original release: September 24 – November 18, 2015

Season chronology
- ← Previous; Season 2 Next → Season 4

The third season of MTV's reality dating series Are You the One? premiered on September 24, 2015.

== Cast ==
Male cast members	Age	Hometown
Alec Gonzalez	22	Philadelphia, Pennsylvania
Austin Sheets	22	Addison, Texas
Chuck Mowery	26	Maui, Hawaii
Connor Smith	25	Tinley Park, Illinois
Devin Walker-Molaghan	26	Northampton, Massachusetts
Hunter Barfield	22	Perry, Florida
Mike Crescenzo	24	Stony Brook, New York
Nelson Thomas	26	San Marcos, Texas
Tyler Johnson	25	Indianapolis, Indiana
Zak Longo	26	Toronto, Canada

Female cast members	Age	Hometown
Amanda Garcia	22	Westminster, Colorado
Britni Thornton	24	Augusta, Georgia
Chelsey Perkins	23	Orlando, Florida
Hannah Rathbun	22	Syracuse, New York
Kayla Brackett	22	Sandy Hook, Connecticut
Kiki Cooper	24	Ashburn, Virginia
Cheyenne Floyd	22	Los Angeles, California
Melanie Velez	23	Franklin Square, New York
Rashida Beach	23	Columbia, South Carolina
Stacey Gurnevich	24	Staten Island, New York

== Progress ==
Guys	Ceremony									
Guys	1	2	3	4	5	6	7	8	9	10
Alec	Stacey	Chelsey	Stacey	Amanda	Stacey	Stacey	Rashida	Stacey	Stacey	Amanda
Austin	Kiki	Kiki	Amanda	Stacey	Hannah	Cheyenne	Kayla	Kiki	Cheyenne	Britni
Chuck	Hannah	Hannah	Kiki	Kiki	Kiki	Amanda	Melanie	Amanda	Rashida	Melanie
Connor	Chelsey	Kayla	Chelsey	Chelsey	Chelsey	Chelsey	Chelsey	Chelsey	Chelsey	Chelsey
Devin	Melanie	Melanie	Rashida	Hannah	Cheyenne	Rashida	Britni	Rashida	Britni	Rashida
Hunter	Britni	Stacey	Britni	Rashida	Melanie	Britni	Amanda	Britni	Kayla	Hannah
Mike	Amanda	Amanda	Kayla	Kayla	Britni	Melanie	Stacey	Melanie	Kiki	Kiki
Nelson	Cheyenne	Cheyenne	Melanie	Britni	Rashida	Kiki	Kiki	Kayla	Amanda	Stacey
Tyler	Rashida	Rashida	Cheyenne	Melanie	Amanda	Hannah	Cheyenne	Cheyenne	Melanie	Cheyenne
Zak	Kayla	Britni	Hannah	Cheyenne	Kayla	Kayla	Hannah	Hannah	Hannah	Kayla
Correct matches	2	0	3	2	2	3	3	3	2	10

Girls	Ceremony									
Girls	1	2	3	4	5	6	7	8	9	10
Amanda	Mike	Mike	Austin	Alec	Tyler	Chuck	Hunter	Chuck	Nelson	Alec
Britni	Hunter	Zak	Hunter	Nelson	Mike	Hunter	Devin	Hunter	Devin	Austin
Chelsey	Connor	Alec	Connor	Connor	Connor	Connor	Connor	Connor	Connor	Connor
Cheyenne	Nelson	Nelson	Tyler	Zak	Devin	Austin	Tyler	Tyler	Austin	Tyler
Hannah	Chuck	Chuck	Zak	Devin	Austin	Tyler	Zak	Zak	Zak	Hunter
Kayla	Zak	Connor	Mike	Mike	Zak	Zak	Austin	Nelson	Hunter	Zak
Kiki	Austin	Austin	Chuck	Chuck	Chuck	Nelson	Nelson	Austin	Mike	Mike
Melanie	Devin	Devin	Nelson	Tyler	Hunter	Mike	Chuck	Mike	Tyler	Chuck
Rashida	Tyler	Tyler	Devin	Hunter	Nelson	Devin	Alec	Devin	Chuck	Devin
Stacey	Alec	Hunter	Alec	Austin	Alec	Alec	Mike	Alec	Alec	Nelson
Correct matches	2	0	3	2	2	3	3	3	2	10

Notes

- Name Unconfirmed perfect match
- Name Confirmed perfect match
- Due to the blackout in Episode 2, the whole cast lost $250,000, lowering the total money at the end to $750,000.
- In Episode 9, Mike was removed from the competition due to an altercation that turned violent with Amanda. The girls were still able to choose Mike that week and Kiki chose him during her turn.

=== Truth Booths ===
Couple	Episode	Result
Hunter & Kiki	1	Not A Match
Devin & Kiki	2	Not A Match
Zak & Kiki	3	Not A Match
Chuck & Britni	4	Not A Match
Connor & Chelsey	5	Perfect Match
Chuck & Kiki	6	Not A Match
Alec & Melanie	7	Not A Match
Nelson & Kiki	8	Not A Match
Hunter & Britni	9	Not A Match
Zak & Kayla	10	Perfect Match

== Episodes ==
No. overall	No. in season	Title	Original release date	U.S. viewers (millions)
21	1	"Once in a Lifetime Chance Brings Romance"	September 24, 2015	0.92
20 singles come to Hawaii to find their perfect match with a $1,000,000 prize if they do so. This time if they black out in the match-up they will lose a quarter of that money.
22	2	"Can't Buy Me Love"	September 30, 2015	0.51
Devin and Kiki get closer, while it costs Melanie to get to know Tyler a little better. Mike and Amanda still have their connection in the house, and when Alec couldn't show Stacey respect, she tries to move on with Hunter. At the truth booth Devin and Kiki find out they are not a perfect match but still want to be together. At the match-up ceremony the contestants got their first black out which cost them $ 250,000.
23	3	"Libido Limbo"	October 7, 2015	0.69
After their first black out some couples know they have to move on, while others want to still be together. Stacey, now knowing that Hunter is not her match, wants to go back to Alec and Kiki wants to make a connection with Chuck. During the challenge, Mike, Chuck, and Zak made selfish choices by choosing Britni, Amanda, and Kiki for their dates. During the dates, Mike and Britni and Chuck and Amanda made some connections unlike Zak and Kiki but in the truth booth Zak and Kiki are not a match which made them happy.
24	4	"Mazed and Confused"	October 14, 2015	0.76
Alec believes Amanda could be his match, but she thinks he can't keep her under control. Kayla still wants to be with Connor which upsets Chelsey. Britni makes her move on Chuck, making him think they are a match. After the challenge, Chuck and Britni and Zak and Cheyenne go on their date and make connections. After the date, Hannah makes a move on Chuck, which causes things to get heated between her and Britni. At the truth booth Chuck and Britni learn they are not a match. Rashida thinks Devin could be her match but is upset about his relationship with Kiki. At the match up, when neither Alec nor Devin choose her, Rashida gets emotional and leaves the ceremony. Kayla is upset that Connor wants to be with Chelsey rather than her.
25	5	"The Little Merman"	October 21, 2015	0.59
Kayla gets physical with Connor and wants him and Chelsey out of the house. At the challenge Chelsey wins and Melanie lets Rashida win her challenge. Chelsey choose Connor for her date and picks Nelson for Rashida's. Zak and Cheyenne kiss while Nelson is on his date. Nelson learns about Zak and Cheyenne's kiss and Chuck and Britni hook-up in front of the whole house, making Hannah feel betrayed and erasing any feelings she had towards Chuck. Perfect Match #1: Chelsey & Connor
26	6	"Getting Lei'd"	October 28, 2015	0.62
Kayla is upset that Connor is out of the house. In the challenge, Chuck and Austin win and they take Kiki and Cheyenne on their dates. Some people in the house thinks it's best to send Austin and Cheyenne in the Truth Booth, as Kiki has been sent in three times. The Truth Booth reveals that Chuck and Kiki are not a match, which angers Devin and leaves Kiki emotionally upset since she only has four guys left (Alec, Nelson, Tyler and Mike). Tyler and Melanie continue to make a connection and wonder if they are a perfect match. At the ceremony, Tyler surprises everyone by picking Hannah and Devin and Kiki reveal their relationship.
27	7	"Peanut Butter and Jealous"	November 4, 2015	0.67
28	8	"Sorry Dad"	November 11, 2015	0.73
29	9	"Breaking Point"	November 18, 2015	0.89
30	10	"Never Give Up on Love"	November 18, 2015	0.92
Perfect Match #2: Kayla & Zak

== After filming ==
Mike Crescenzo was later a cast member of the thirty-second season of The Real World.

Devin Walker-Molaghan & Rashida Beach competed on Are You The One?: Second Chances.

In 2017, Cheyenne Floyd gave birth to her and Real World: Ex-Plosion cast member Cory Wharton's daughter, Ryder. A year later, Floyd joined the cast of Teen Mom OG and also appeared on How Far Is Tattoo Far? On May 27, 2021, Floyd gave birth to son Ace Terrell with, now husband, Zach Davis.

Nelson Thomas appeared on the second season of Ex on the Beach. Devin Walker appeared on the third season.

In 2020, Amanda Garcia welcomed first son Avonni with then-boyfriend Ray Reinhardt.

On December 17, 2021, Connor Smith was arrested for an alleged sexual assault of a 16-year-old girl in July 2021. He was charged with rape, sexual battery, and two counts of criminal confinement. Those charges were later dropped after the victim stopped cooperating with the police. In March 2023, Smith was caught sending illicit images to an undercover police agent posing as a 15 year old girl. When he went to go meet the girl, he was spotted by police attempting to apprehend him and ran from the police. As of March 2024 Smith is still on the run and is believed to be in South Florida.

=== The Challenge ===
Cast member	Seasons of The Challenge	Other appearances
Amanda Garcia	Rivals III, Invasion of the Champions, XXX: Dirty 30, Final Reckoning, War of the Worlds, Spies, Lies & Allies, Battle of the Eras	The Challenge: USA (season 2)
Britni Thornton	XXX: Dirty 30, Vendettas, Final Reckoning	—N/a
Cheyenne Floyd	Rivals III	—N/a
Chuck Mowery	Final Reckoning	—N/a
Devin Walker-Molaghan	Rivals III, XXX: Dirty 30, Vendettas, Final Reckoning, Double Agents, Spies, Lies & Allies, Ride or Dies, Battle of the Eras	The Challenge: Champs vs. Stars (season 2), The Challenge: All Stars (season 5)
Hunter Barfield	Invasion of the Champions, XXX: Dirty 30, Final Reckoning, War of the Worlds	—N/a
Nelson Thomas	Rivals III, Invasion of the Champions, XXX: Dirty 30, Vendettas, Final Reckoning, Total Madness, Double Agents, Spies, Lies & Allies, Ride or Dies, Cutthroat (2026)	The Challenge: World Championship

Note: Devin appeared on Battle for a New Champion for an elimination
