= Are You the One? season 2 =

American reality television program

Are You the One?
- Season 2
- Presented by: Ryan Devlin
- No. of contestants: 21
- Location: San Juan, Puerto Rico
- No. of episodes: 10

Release
- Original network: MTV
- Original release: October 6 – December 8, 2014

Season chronology
- ← Previous; Season 1 Next → Season 3

The second season of MTV's reality dating series Are You the One? premiered on October 6, 2014. Unlike the previous season, one male contestant had two matches, resulting in eleven female but only ten male contestants.

== Cast ==
Male cast members	Age	Hometown
Alex Phillips	23	Los Angeles, California
Anthony Bartolotte	22	Chicago, Illinois
Brandon Tindel	25	Las Vegas, Nevada
Curtis Hadzicki	24	Cardiff, California
Dario Medrano	21	Salem, Massachusetts
Garland Brown	22	St. Louis, Missouri
John Moustis	22	Louisville, Kentucky
Layton Jones	25	Greenville, Mississippi
Nathan Siebenmark	22	Berrien Springs, Michigan
Tyler Pratt	23	Orlando, Florida

Female cast members	Age	Hometown
Alexandria Kim	23	Carlsbad, California
Ashley Hall	21	San Marcos, Texas
Briana LaCuesta	21	San Diego, California
Christina LeBlanc	24	Philadelphia, Pennsylvania
Ellie Puckett	23	Hamlet, North Carolina
Jasmine Pendleton	22	San Diego, California
Jenni Knapmiller	22	Burnsville, Minnesota
Jessica Andreatta	22	Westchester, New York
Paris Eike	23	Denver, Colorado
Shelby Yardley	21	Derby, Kansas
Tyler Abron	21	Boston, Massachusetts

== Progress ==
Guys	Ceremony									
Guys	1	2	3	4	5	6	7	8	9	10
Alex	Ellie	Christina	Jasmine	Tyler	Christina	Jessica	Jasmine	Jasmine	Jasmine	Jasmine
Anthony	Jessica	Alexandria	Jenni	Jenni	Ashley	Ellie	Briana	Jessica	Alexandria	Alexandria
Brandon	Christina	Tyler	Shelby	Ellie	Jasmine	Ashley	Tyler	Tyler	Briana	Briana
Curtis	Briana	Briana	Briana	Briana	Shelby	Shelby	Shelby	Shelby	Shelby	Shelby
Dario	Ashley	Shelby	Ashley	Shelby	Alexandria	Briana	Ashley	Ashley	Tyler	Ashley
Garland	Alexandria	Jasmine	Alexandria	Jasmine	Tyler	Tyler	Jessica	Alexandria	Jessica	Jessica
John	Jasmine	Ashley	Christina	Christina	Jenni	Alexandria	Jenni	Jenni	Jenni	Jenni
Layton	Jenni	Jessica	Ellie	Jessica	Briana	Jenni	Ellie	Ellie	Ashley	Christina & Tyler
Nathan	Shelby	Jenni	Jessica	Alexandria	Jessica	Jasmine	Christina	Briana	Ellie	Ellie
Pratt	Paris	Paris	Paris	Paris	Paris	Paris	Paris	Paris	Paris	Paris
Correct matches	2	2	3	1	3	2	6	5	8	10

Girls	Ceremony									
Girls	1	2	3	4	5	6	7	8	9	10
Alexandria	Garland	Anthony	Garland	Nathan	Dario	John	—N/a	Garland	Anthony	Anthony
Ashley	Dario	John	Dario	—N/a	Anthony	Brandon	Dario	Dario	Layton	Dario
Briana	Curtis	Curtis	Curtis	Curtis	Layton	Dario	Anthony	Nathan	Brandon	Brandon
Christina	Brandon	Alex	John	John	Alex	—N/a	Nathan	—N/a	—N/a	Layton
Ellie	Alex	—N/a	Layton	Brandon	—N/a	Anthony	Layton	Layton	Nathan	Nathan
Jasmine	John	Garland	Alex	Garland	Brandon	Nathan	Alex	Alex	Alex	Alex
Jenni	Layton	Nathan	Anthony	Anthony	John	Layton	John	John	John	John
Jessica	Anthony	Layton	Nathan	Layton	Nathan	Alex	Garland	Anthony	Garland	Garland
Paris	Pratt	Pratt	Pratt	Pratt	Pratt	Pratt	Pratt	Pratt	Pratt	Pratt
Shelby	Nathan	Dario	Brandon	Dario	Curtis	Curtis	Curtis	Curtis	Curtis	Curtis
Tyler	—N/a	Brandon	—N/a	Alex	Garland	Garland	Brandon	Brandon	Dario	Layton
Correct matches	2	2	3	1	3	2	6	5	8	10

Notes

- Name Unconfirmed perfect match
- Name Confirmed perfect match

=== Truth Booths ===
Couple	Episode	Result	Eleventh girl
Brandon & Jessica	1	Not A Match	Not A Match
Brandon & Christina	2	Not A Match	Not A Match
Brandon & Alexandria	3	Not A Match	Not A match
Pratt & Paris	4	Perfect Match	Not A Match
Curtis & Shelby	5	Perfect Match	Not A Match
John & Jasmine	6	Not A Match	Not A Match
John & Jenni	7	Perfect Match	Not A Match
Nathan & Christina	8	Not A Match	Not A Match
Alex & Jasmine	9	Perfect Match	Not A Match
Dario & Ashley	10	Perfect Match	Not A Match

== Episodes ==
No. overall	No. in season	Title	Original release date	U.S. viewers (millions)
11	1	"One Too Many"	October 6, 2014	0.71
The wild adventure begins with all new singles looking for love and money. The cast gets to know one another, hook-ups happen, relationships form, and an 11th girl is brought on to shake things up. Paris and Pratt try to avoid the Truth Booth by faking a fight with each other, but the other housemates aren't pleased when they find this out. John accidentally fractures Briana's nose, causing her to temporarily be taken out of the game.
12	2	"The Truth Will Cost You"	October 13, 2014	0.65
Relationships continue to form and several couples become convinced that they've found their match. Brandon and Christina stick together, while something personal allows Briana to become closer to Curtis. Layton and Shelby are entangled in love triangles. The guys dig up dirt on the girls.
13	3	"Virgin Tears"	October 20, 2014	0.63
The house can't agree on a strategy. Shelby ends her love triangle, which results in Nate having a meltdown over Shelby. John tries to move in on Christina, but gets blocked by Brandon and Jenni sees a side to Layton that she doesn't like. Tyler continues to struggle making connections with the guys in the house.
14	4	"Loose Lips Sink Relationships"	October 27, 2014	0.58
The house decides to relieve some tension. An alcohol-fueled mistake by Paris threatens her relationship with Pratt. Perfect Match #1: Paris & Pratt
15	5	"Strap Those Boots Tight"	November 3, 2014	0.68
The house is stunned by the last matchup ceremony. With Anthony no longer being an option, Jenni thinks that Layton is her match. Ellie shares her feelings for Anthony, but does not get the reaction she wants. Brandon tries to move on from Christina. Another perfect match is found, which ends up tearing apart one of the closest couples in the house. The house has an argument-filled Matchup Ceremony. Perfect Match #2: Shelby & Curtis
16	6	"Parental Guidance"	November 10, 2014	0.80
The ladies get a surprise visit from their parents, who come in to interrogate the guys. Jess and Ellie target Jenni, while tension between Layton and Anthony reaches its boiling point. The house has another failed Matchup Ceremony.
17	7	"Hot Salsa"	November 17, 2014	0.65
After another failed Matchup Ceremony, the house is eager for a fresh start. Ashley finds herself in a potentially explosive love triangle. John believes he finally found his match in Jenni but the house isn't so sure. Brandon continues to make enemies in the house. Perfect Match #3: Jenni & John
18	8	"Dumped"	November 24, 2014	0.63
Dario and Layton's battle over Ashley intensifies. Ellie is interested in Nathan, but Christina and Nathan believe they've found their perfect match in each other. Brandon and Briana get to know each other better. The house has to decide which couple to put into the truth booth. The wrong decision may cost them the game. Christina reaches her breaking point as the pressure of being the 11th girl begins to take its toll.
19	9	"Old Flames"	December 1, 2014	0.70
Despite not being a match, Nathan explodes when Christina returns to Brandon. With just two Matchup Ceremonies left, some newfound connections are made between certain people in the house. Ashley's indecision over Layton and Dario may cost the house the win. Perfect Match #4: Jasmine & Alex
20	10	"One Switch, One Glitch"	December 8, 2014	0.92
The rivalry between Dario and Layton comes to an end. Layton tries to figure out whether to make a connection with Tyler or Christina. Ellie and Nathan's heart to heart talk leaves her heartbroken. The house endures a final Matchup Ceremony. With only one switch away from winning the money, Layton makes a shocking decision that ends up putting everybody's game in jeopardy. Perfect Match #5: Ashley & Dario

== After filming ==
Nate Siebenmark & Ellie Puckett competed on Are You The One?: Second Chances.

Anthony Bartolette appeared on the third season of the MTV dating show Ex on the Beach.

=== The Challenge ===
Cast member	Seasons of The Challenge	Other appearances
Anthony Bartolotte	Invasion of the Champions	—N/a
Brandon Tindel	Rivals III	—N/a
Briana LaCuesta	Rivals III, XXX: Dirty 30	—N/a
Christina LeBlanc	Battle of the Bloodlines, Rivals III	—N/a
Dario Medrano	Battle of the Bloodlines, Rivals III, Invasion of the Champions, XXX: Dirty 30	The Challenge: All Stars (season 5)
Nathan "Nate" Siebenmark	Rivals III	—N/a
