= List of Ex on the Beach (American TV series) episodes =

The following is a list of episodes for the American reality television series, Ex on the Beach that first aired on MTV on April 19, 2018.

== Series overview ==
Season	Episodes	Originally released	
Season	Episodes	First released	Last released
1	11	April 19, 2018	June 28, 2018
2	14	December 20, 2018	April 4, 2019
3	14	July 16, 2019	October 24, 2019
4	14	December 5, 2019	February 27, 2020
5	12	March 31, 2022	June 16, 2022
6	12	February 9, 2023	April 27, 2023

== Episodes ==
=== Season 1 (2018) ===
No. overall	No. in season	Title	Original release date	U.S. viewers (millions)
1	1	"Welcome to Ex on the Beach"	April 19, 2018	0.93
2	2	"Exed Out"	April 26, 2018	0.72
3	3	"Two Exes Don't Make a Right"	May 3, 2018	0.73
4	4	"I Wanna Call You Babe"	May 10, 2018	0.88
5	5	"Who's Exed Next?"	May 17, 2018	0.84
6	6	"Bye Alicia Hi Alicia"	May 24, 2018	0.69
7	7	"Party Foul"	May 31, 2018	0.89
8	8	"Monster Mode"	June 7, 2018	0.85
9	9	"You Can't Handle the Truth"	June 14, 2018	0.86
10	10	"Return of All the Exes"	June 21, 2018	0.86
11	11	"Can You Ever Get Over Your Ex?"	June 28, 2018	0.84

=== Season 2 (2018–2019) ===
No. overall	No. in season	Title	Original release date	U.S. viewers (millions)
12	1	"Paradise From Hell"	December 20, 2018	0.63
13	2	"Being Shady 101"	December 27, 2018	0.66
14	3	"Simon Says"	January 3, 2019	0.75
15	4	"Worst Date Ever"	January 10, 2019	0.68
16	5	"Jay is for Jealous"	January 17, 2019	0.67
17	6	"Low Blows"	January 24, 2019	0.70
18	7	"Revenge is Sweet"	January 31, 2019	0.63
19	8	"Here Comes Trouble"	February 7, 2019	0.59
20	9	"Un-Bear-Able"	February 14, 2019	0.64
21	10	"How to Keep a Man 101"	February 21, 2019	0.62
22	11	"Ghost of a Relationship's Past"	February 28, 2019	0.63
23	12	"Bad Bromance"	March 7, 2019	0.63
24	13	"Ex-viction Notice"	March 14, 2019	0.76
25	14	"Ex, Lies, and Polygraph Tape"	March 21, 2019	0.71
–	–	"Reunion"	March 28, 2019 April 4, 2019	0.57 0.67

=== Season 3 (2019) ===
No. overall	No. in season	Title	Original release date	U.S. viewers (millions)
26	1	"Love, Next Love"	July 16, 2019	0.55
27	2	"Serving Revenge"	July 23, 2019	0.55
28	3	"I Put a Crush on You"	July 30, 2019	0.47
29	4	"Cam You Feel the Love Tonight"	August 6, 2019	0.39
30	5	"This is Episode 5, but Let's Call it 6"	August 15, 2019	0.53
31	6	"The Mother of All Secrets"	August 22, 2019	0.39
32	7	"Exes Haunt These Fields"	August 29, 2019	0.42
33	8	"Coffey Run"	September 5, 2019	0.43
34	9	"I Want it That Way"	September 12, 2019	0.38
35	10	"Roses are Red, Exes Make you Blue"	September 19, 2019	0.48
36	11	"Thruple Trouble"	September 26, 2019	0.37
37	12	"Two for One Deal"	October 3, 2019	0.47
38	13	"Show me the Receipts"	October 10, 2019	0.43
39	14	"The Final Crush"	October 17, 2019	0.44
–	–	"Reunion"	October 24, 2019	0.44

=== Season 4 (2019–2020) ===
No. overall	No. in season	Title	Original release date	U.S. viewers (millions)
40	1	"Welcome to the Peak"	December 5, 2019	0.40
41	2	"Winter Un-Wonderland"	December 5, 2019	0.33
42	3	"Caught Red Velvet Handed"	December 12, 2019	0.32
43	4	"De Niall is not Just an Ex"	December 19, 2019	0.28
44	5	"Boo Years Eve!"	December 26, 2019	0.31
45	6	"The Bird Has Landed"	January 2, 2020	0.39
46	7	"SOS, Save Our Singles"	January 9, 2020	0.37
47	8	"Ex-cuzzi"	January 16, 2020	0.37
48	9	"Mums the Word"	January 23, 2020	0.30
49	10	"Don't Say Soulmate"	January 30, 2020	0.35
50	11	"Adore-able Mess"	February 6, 2020	0.38
51	12	"Breaking Winter Balls"	February 13, 2020	0.30
52	13	"Liar, Liar, Chalet on Fire"	February 20, 2020	0.37
53	14	"Say Yes to the Next"	February 27, 2020	0.32

=== Season 5 (2022) ===
No. overall	No. in season	Title	Original release date	U.S. viewers (millions)
54	1	"Can You Handle the Table of Truth?"	March 31, 2022	0.15
55	2	"Ain't That a Beach"	April 7, 2022	0.14
56	3	"The Lengths We Go to Lie to an Ex"	April 14, 2022	0.19
57	4	"Wait, That's Not an Ex"	April 21, 2022	0.21
58	5	"The Ex-Husband and the Best Friend"	April 28, 2022	0.15
59	6	"Seeing Is Believing"	May 5, 2022	0.16
60	7	"You Can't Get Divorced Twice"	May 12, 2022	0.21
61	8	"Ready For More Baggage?"	May 19, 2022	0.20
62	9	"Exes Court Is Now in Session"	May 26, 2022	0.19
63	10	"Something Like the Truth"	June 2, 2022	0.18
64	11	"Where's the Lie?"	June 9, 2022	0.20
65	12	"Setting Sail on a Relation-Ship"	June 16, 2022	0.22

=== Season 6 (2023) ===
No. overall	No. in season	Title	Original release date	U.S. viewers (millions)
66	1	"Journey to Engagement"	February 9, 2023	0.15
67	2	"You're Breaking My Heart"	February 16, 2023	0.13
68	3	"Secrets of the Past"	February 23, 2023	0.09
69	4	"Hitting Rock Bottom"	March 2, 2023	0.11
70	5	"We Need This Time Apart"	March 9, 2023	0.11
71	6	"I Can Love You Better"	March 16, 2023	0.12
72	7	"More Than Just Your Ex"	March 23, 2023	0.11
73	8	"Burying Your Relationship"	March 30, 2023	0.08
74	9	"Call Me By My Name"	April 6, 2023	0.10
75	10	"Reunited Doesn't Feel So Good"	April 13, 2023	0.12
76	11	"This Is What Heartbreak Feels Like"	April 27, 2023	0.10
77	12	"Now or Never"	April 27, 2023	0.08
