= The Challenge XXX: Dirty 30 =

30th season of the reality television series

XXX: Dirty 30
- Season 30
- Presented by: T. J. Lavin
- No. of contestants: 31
- Winners: Jordan Wiseley; Camila Nakagawa
- Location: Cartagena, Colombia; Salta, Argentina
- No. of episodes: 19 (including the two-part Reunion special/finale)

Release
- Original network: MTV
- Original release: July 18 – November 28, 2017

Season chronology
- ← Previous; Invasion of the Champions Next → Vendettas

The Challenge XXX: Dirty 30 (often promoted as The Challenge XXX) is the 30th season of the MTV reality competition series, The Challenge. It was filmed in Colombia during May and June 2017, with alumni from The Real World, Road Rules, The Challenge, and Are You the One? competing. Jonathan Murray, Gil Goldschein, Scott Freeman, and Fred Birckhead were the executive producers, with Ryan Smith and Danny Wascou serving as co-executive producers.

A launch special aired on July 11, 2017, and the season premiered on July 18, 2017. The season concluded with a two-part reunion special/finale on November 14 and 21, 2017 and behind-the-scenes special of the reunion and the reunion after-party on November 28, 2017. It also marks the first chapter of a Challenge trilogy, followed by Vendettas and Final Reckoning.

== Format ==
The cast of the thirtieth season of The Challenge, excluding Briana LaCuesta

The main elements of the game are as follows:

- Daily Missions: Each round, the players compete in a challenge. The challenges will vary between individual and team challenges. The winners are immune from elimination and nominate one player of each gender for the Elimination Round. The losers players are eligible for the Double Cross. In some challenges, not everyone is eligible for the Double Cross but is still vulnerable to be nominated by the winning team.
- Nominations: The winners from the Main Match openly vote to nominate one other player of each gender for the Elimination Round.
- Elimination Rounds (Presidio): At the "Presidio", the "Double Cross" Draw is held. All losing players from the Daily Mission participate in a Random-Draw. The player who draws the Double Cross is safe from elimination and must nominate a fellow losing player of their Gender into the Presidio.The winners remain in the game, while the losers are eliminated.

In the end, only six players - 3 male and 3 female - compete in the final challenge for a share of $1,000,000. The winners of each gender win $450,000, the runners-up win $35,000, third place win $15,000.

Twists

- Purge Challenges: Some challenges are designated as Purges - sudden death challenges where the losers are immediately eliminated.
  - In the opening challenge "The Purge", the players competed in several rounds to guarantee their safety, with 3 players of each gender being eliminated.
  - The "X Marks the Spot" and "Snaking Your Way Back In" challenges composed the second purge of the game. This purge would narrow down the 10 players, to the final 6 that would face the Final Challenge.
- Vote-offs: At some points in the game, the winners of the Daily Mission also win the power to vote-off one of the losers.
  - In "The Purge", the winners of the final part of the challenge has to vote-off 3 out of the 4 remaining losing players of their gender.
  - In "Blackout", the winning team has to vote one male and one female out of the game.
  - In "Backstabber", the individual winners vote one male and one female out of the game.
- Redemption House: The "Redemption House" gives eliminated players a chance to re-enter the game. Periodically, the players in Redemption House participate in a Redemption Game, with the winners returning to the game, while the losers are officially eliminated.

== Contestants ==
Male contestants	Original season	Finish
Jordan Wiseley	The Real World: Portland	Winner
Derrick Kosinski	Road Rules: X-Treme	Runner-up
Chris "CT" Tamburello	The Real World: Paris	Third place
Hunter Barfield	Are You the One? 3	Episode 16
Tony Raines	Real World: Skeletons	Episode 16
Johnny "Bananas" Devenanzio	The Real World: Key West	Episode 14
Leroy Garrett	The Real World: Las Vegas (2011)	Episode 13
Dario Medrano	Are You the One? 2	Episode 12
Nelson Thomas	Are You the One? 3	Episode 11 (Note: Nelson was disqualified from the competition at the end of Episode 11, after a physical altercation with Derrick K.)
Cory Wharton	Real World: Ex-Plosion	Episode 8
Chris "Ammo" Ammon Hall	Real World: Go Big or Go Home	Episode 6
Derrick Henry	Are You the One? 5	Episode 3
Darrell Taylor	Road Rules: Campus Crawl	Episode 1
Shane Raines	The Challenge: Battle of the Bloodlines	Episode 1
Devin Walker-Molaghan	Are You the One? 3	Episode 1

Female contestants	Original season	Finish
Camila Nakagawa	Spring Break Challenge	Winner
Cara Maria Sorbello	The Challenge: Fresh Meat II	Runner-up
Tori Deal	Are You the One? 4	Third place
Jenna Compono	Real World: Ex-Plosion	Episode 16
Kailah Casillas	Real World: Go Big or Go Home	Episode 16
Britni Thornton	Are You the One? 3	Episode 14
Veronica Portillo	Road Rules: Semester at Sea	Episode 14
Jemmye Carroll	The Real World: New Orleans (2010)	Episode 13
Aneesa Ferreira	The Real World: Chicago	Episode 12
Nicole Ramos	The Challenge: Battle of the Bloodlines	Episode 9
Marie Roda	The Real World: St. Thomas	Episode 7
Briana LaCuesta	Are You the One? 2	Episode 3
LaToya Jackson	The Real World: St. Thomas	Episode 1
Amanda Garcia	Are You the One? 3	Episode 1
Simone Kelly	Are You the One? 1	Episode 1
Ashley Mitchell	Real World: Ex-Plosion	Episode 1 (Note: Before any challenges took place, Ashley quit the game when she became upset over not having her luggage in time for the first daily challenge as well as exhaustion from coming straight from physical hardship on Champs vs. Pros into filming season 30.)

== Gameplay ==
=== Challenge games ===
- The Purge: This challenge is played in three different phases. In the first phase, which is individual, each player must roll barrels up a hill. The top four finishers of each gender are safe from elimination. In the second phase, which is played as two teams, each team must carry a pair of cannons up a hill. The players from the team that win are the next to be safe from elimination. In the third phase, each remaining player must race toward a pile of cannonballs, bring it up a hill and fire with their cannon. The first player of each gender to fire their cannons are the last to be safe from elimination, and choose three players (out of four) of the same gender to be eliminated.
  - Round 1 Winners: Aneesa, Bananas, Camila, Derrick K., Hunter, Jordan, Kailah & Tori
  - Round 2 Winners: Blue Team (Ammo, Britni, Cara Maria, Dario, Derrick H., Leroy, Marie, Nelson, Nicole & Veronica)
  - Round 3 Winners: Cory & Jenna
  - Sent to Redemption: Amanda, Devin, Darrell, LaToya, Shane & Simone
- Cool Under Fire: Players are suspended 30 feet above the water while sitting on a ledge against a wall. Every so often the wall tilts forward to make it harder to remain on. There are safety ropes along the wall in order to allow players to get into position, but they are not allowed to grab them once the horn has been blown. The challenge is played in two heats of six males and six females per heat. The remaining not playing in the heat may choose to launch rotten tomatoes from stationary slingshots at their opponents. The two male and two female players to last the longest in each heat are declared the winners. The two males and two females to fall first are the losers of the challenge and are eligible for The Double Cross.
  - Heat 1 Winners: Cara Maria, Derrick K., Nelson & Nicole
  - Heat 2 Winners: Bananas, Camila, CT & Tori
- Battle Royale: Players are divided into two teams of ten and the challenge is played in male and female heats. Teams start from opposing poles in the arena with a narrow hallway in the middle. At the sound of a horn, players must run through the hallway to the opposing team's pole to retrieve five rings hanging from their pole. Upon retrieving these rings, teams must run back to their starting pole and place their opponents rings on them. Each player is responsible for grabbing a ring. The first team to win two heats wins while the losing team is eligible for The Double Cross. The two players not selected for a team sit out from the challenge and are also eligible for The Double Cross.
  - Winners: Aneesa, CT, Cara Maria, Cory, Dario, Hunter, Leroy, Marie, Tori & Veronica
- Pirates' Treasure: Played in male-female pairs and in two heats. Pairs must carry a 100 lb chest through a series of obstacles in order to reach the finish line. Once reaching the finish line, players must smash open their chests with a hammer in order to a retrieve a Jolly Roger flag which they must hoist up a flagpole to complete. The first pair to hoist their flag in each heat wins while the bottom two pairs in each heat are declared the losers and are eligible for The Double Cross.
  - Heat 1 Winners: CT & Cara Maria
  - Heat 2 Winners: Nelson & Veronica
- Ups And Downs: Players must divide themselves into teams of four with two males and two females on each team. Teams have to place the thirty Challenge logos in chronological order using placards on a tall beam. One player is in charge of placing the placards in order while the remaining three teammates hoist them up and down the beam using a rope. The first team to place all of their logos in order is declared the winning team. The two last-place teams are eligible for The Double Cross.
  - Winners: Camila, Cara Maria, CT & Leroy
- Talk Thirty to Me: Players are suspended 30 feet in the air above water and are asked a series of trivia questions related to their cast-mates. If a player gets a question wrong, they receive an 'X' to their score, but if they answer correctly they are able to add an 'X' to an opposing player's score. Once a player has three 'X's they are out of the challenge. The game is played in a male heat and a female heat. The first four players to hit the water in each heat are the losers and eligible for The Double Cross. The last male and female players standing are the winners of the challenge and also receive a getaway for themselves and a friend.
  - Winners: Camila & Tony
- Saved By The Bell: Players are divided into four teams of four. Teams must go from one platform 30 feet in the air to the other platform across the way hopping across a series of bells. They must do this while another team is competing as well. The team to finish the fastest, or with the most players across, is declared the winning team. All three losing teams are eligible for The Double Cross. The two players not selected for a team sit out from the challenge and are also be eligible for The Double Cross.
  - Winners: Camila, CT, Hunter & Kailah
- Blackout: Players are placed into three teams of five. Teams are placed inside a blacked-out 8x8 box where they are unable to see anything. They must scratch and claw the paint away from their window to unveil numbers that unlock a combination to a pickaxe and use the pickaxe to escape the box and then solve a three-dimensional puzzle. The first team to solve the puzzle wins, while the two losing teams are eligible for the Double Cross. The winning team is also able to select one male and one female to send straight to the Redemption House.
  - Winners: Britni, Jordan, Kailah, Tony & Veronica
  - Sent to Redemption: CT & Cara Maria
- Backstabber: On the top of a building, players must walk across a balance beam. There are three 'X's at the end of every beam, representing the other players. The first player to reach their X's may knock whoever they'd like off of a beam. The fastest male and fastest female players to complete the challenge win while all losing players are eligible for The Double Cross. The challenge is played in two heats (for male and female players). The first player knocked off in each heat is eligible to be sent straight to the Redemption House by the winners.
  - Winners: Hunter & Jenna
  - Sent to Redemption: Jordan & Veronica
- X Marks the Spot: Players divide themselves into male-female pairs and compete in an obstacle course that lead them to puzzle pieces. Once the pairs retrieve their puzzle pieces, they split off as individuals to complete their puzzles. The first two males and the first two females to complete their puzzles earn their spot in the final challenge.
  - Winners: Cara Maria, CT, Jordan & Tori
- Snaking Your Way Back In: Players are hanging from two blue ropes on a structure 30 feet above the water. They must shimmy their way until they reach a yellow rope and must transition onto it. They must then shimmy off the structure and swim to a buoy and wrap their rope around it. The first male and female player to put their rope around their buoy win and continue on to the final challenge while the losers are eliminated from the game.
  - Winners: Camila & Derrick K.
  - Eliminated: Hunter, Jenna, Kailah & Tony

=== Presidio games ===
- Balls to the Wall: Players are placed in separate areas with rods sticking out of the walls attached to metal balls on the end. The male players would compete with ten balls while the female players compete with six balls. The first player to rip out each ball from the wall before their opponent wins.
  - Played by: Cory vs. Derrick H., Briana vs. Britni
- The Great Escape: Players must climb to the top of a plaster wall using pegs to dig through holes hidden behind marked circles. The player reaches the top of the wall and dumps the trough of mud on their opponent wins.
  - Played by: Kailah vs. Jenna, Ammo vs. Tony
- Striptease: Players are blindfolded in the middle of the arena. On their opponent are patches placed on various parts of the body. First player to pull off a patch gains a point. Male players play in a best-of-9 rounds formant while females play best-of-5. First male to 5 and first female to 3 wins.
  - Played by: Jordan vs. Ammo, Marie vs. Tori
- Deadweight: Players must climb their respective ladder and ring the bell to win. However, their ankles are attached to weights and must pull them through breakable walls while climbing up. The first player to reach the bell wins.
  - Played by: Aneesa vs. Kailah, Cory vs. Hunter
- Rampage: Players are assigned a color before being tied to each other, back-to-back. Players then have to drag their opponents down their assigned-colored ramp to earn a point. The first player to earn two points wins.
  - Played by: Nicole vs. Britni, Nelson vs. Hunter
- Web of Lies: Players start on the top platform of a 25-foot tower, covered in webs and rope. The first player to break through the webs all the way down, retrieve their flag, climb back up to the top platform, and hook their flag to the pole wins.
  - Played by: Dario vs. Tony, Veronica vs. Aneesa
- Body Check: Players have to run through a wall with the door covered in cellophane, colliding into each other, and pass each other to a pole where they around and go straight through another cellophane door where they'll pass each other again to ring a bell. The first person to ring their bell in two out of three rounds wins.
  - Played by: Leroy vs. Hunter, Jemmye vs. Camila
- The Reel World: Players are placed in front of a giant wheel attached to a length of rope with a ball at the end of it. Players then have to jump on the wheel to reel in the rope so that the ball will go pass a line. The first to reel in their rope and have their ball pass the line wins.
  - Played by: Camila vs. Britni, Derrick K. vs. Bananas

=== Redemption games ===
- Man Overboard: Players start on a swinging platform suspended 20 feet above the water and must knock their opponent off the platform and into the water. The challenge is played in one-on-one male and female rounds with two qualifying rounds and one final round. The one player of each gender to win the final round wins the challenge and returns to the competition. The losing six players are eliminated from the game.
  - Winners: Jenna & Tony
- Green With Envy: Players must dine on a series of five disgusting dishes. Once they finish a dish, they must race up the El Totumo mud volcano and dive into the mud to retrieve a toltumo that may contain either an emerald or a rock. If they break open their toltumo and receive an emerald then they may place it in front of whichever dish they would like to avoid eating and head back up the volcano. If it is a rock, they must eat another dish in order to continue. The first male and first female players to finish all five of their dishes return to the game while the losing players are eliminated.
  - Winners: Aneesa & Hunter
- The Final Redemption Challenge: Players poke their heads through holes on a life-sized whack-a-mole board to read a code that provides a combination to a lock that contains puzzle pieces. While they are reading the code, the players still in the competition whack them on the head with mallets to distract them. The first two male players and first female player to retrieve and complete their puzzle return to the game while the losers are permanently eliminated.
  - Winners: Cara Maria, CT & Jordan

=== Final Challenge ===
For the Final Challenge, the competition moved to Salta, Argentina, where the players compete for their share of $1 million. The players complete in a series of timed checkpoints. First place players receive $450,000 each, second receive $35,000 each, and third receive $15,000 each. To begin, players are tasked with skydiving 20,000 feet out of an airplane. Players would then continue on through the course.

- Stage 1: Players must run to the top of the ruins and donate a salt gem. At the top players must wait for the next member of the opposite sex available in order to continue. They must then run back down and donate 30 stones to the apacheta pile in order to stop their time.
- Stage 2: From behind the designated line, pairs must toss their bola onto a pole. After each failed attempt the player must take a shot of fermented llama's milk. Once a pair has hooked their bola their time is stopped.
- Dirty Deed #1: The winners from Stage 1 must assign one of the other pairs an extra bola to toss onto their pole.
- Stage 3: The winning pair from the last stage separate and choose two new partners. The new pairs race to collect puzzle pieces to complete their board. Once the puzzle is completed their time is stopped.
- The Double Cross: Players compete as individuals and draw from The Double Cross. The player who pulls the double cross may assign a five-minute time penalty to the player of their choosing from the same sex.
- Stage 4: Players must race to find an emblem somewhere in the canyon that allow them to complete the design of a totem pole. In order to retrieve their emblem they must climb to the top of the canyon using climbing gear. They must also memorize the pattern on a totem pole within the course in order to complete their puzzle. If a player's puzzle is incorrect they must run back to the totem pole before attempting again.
- Stage 5: The winners from the last stage separate and choose two new partners. Each pair must run into a smokey structure and feel around until they can discover the word on the wall. Once they believe they know the word they must run outside and write the word on a board. If the pair guesses correctly, their time is stopped. If they are incorrect they must run back inside before trying again.
- Dirty Deed #2: The winners from Stage 5 assign one player of the same sex to sleep on the ground all night while the other finalists sleep in beds.
- Stage 6: Players must each put on safety gear and hold onto a sled that is being pulled by a truck for as long as they can and then run to the finish line. If they drop prematurely, they must run the remaining distance. The winners are not revealed until the reunion.
  - Winners: Jordan & Camila
  - Second place: Derrick K. & Cara Maria
  - Third place: CT & Tori

== Game summary ==
Episode		Challenge type	Winners		Saved	—N/a				Eliminated
#	Challenge	Challenge type	Winners		Saved	—N/a				Eliminated
1	The Purge	Individual	Bananas	Kailah	—N/a	—N/a				—N/a
1	The Purge	Individual	Hunter	Camila	—N/a	—N/a				—N/a
1	The Purge	Individual	Jordan	Aneesa	—N/a	—N/a				—N/a
1	The Purge	Individual	Derrick K.	Tori	—N/a	—N/a				—N/a
1	The Purge	2 teams of 10	Blue Team		—N/a	—N/a				—N/a
1	The Purge	Individual	Jenna		Jemmye	—N/a				Simone
1	The Purge	Individual	Jenna		Jemmye	—N/a				Amanda
1	The Purge	Individual	Jenna		Jemmye	—N/a				LaToya
1	The Purge	Individual	Cory		Tony	—N/a				Devin
1	The Purge	Individual	Cory		Tony	—N/a				Shane
1	The Purge	Individual	Cory		Tony	—N/a				Darrell
#	Challenge	Challenge type	Winners		Voted In	XX Holder	Double-Crossed	Presidio game	Winner	Loser
2/3	Cool Under Fire	Individual	Derrick K.	Bananas	Cory	Dario	Derrick H.	Balls to the Wall	Cory	Derrick H.
2/3	Cool Under Fire	Individual	Nelson	CT	Cory	Dario	Derrick H.	Balls to the Wall	Cory	Derrick H.
2/3	Cool Under Fire	Individual	Cara Maria	Camila	Briana	Veronica	Britni	Balls to the Wall	Britni	Briana
2/3	Cool Under Fire	Individual	Nicole	Tori	Briana	Veronica	Britni	Balls to the Wall	Britni	Briana
3/4	Battle Royale	2 teams of 10	Green Team		Kailah	Jemmye	Jenna	The Great Escape	Kailah	Jenna
3/4	Battle Royale	2 teams of 10	Green Team		Ammo	Nelson	Tony	The Great Escape	Ammo	Tony
6/7	Pirates' Treasure	Male/Female pairs	Cara Maria & CT		Jordan	Derrick K.	Ammo	Striptease	Jordan	Ammo
6/7	Pirates' Treasure	Male/Female pairs	Nelson & Veronica		Marie	Aneesa	Tori	Striptease	Tori	Marie
7/8	Ups And Downs	5 teams of 4	Dark Blue Team		Aneesa	Nicole	Kailah	Deadweight	Kailah	Aneesa
7/8	Ups And Downs	5 teams of 4	Dark Blue Team		Cory	Jordan	Hunter	Deadweight	Hunter	Cory
8/9	Talk Thirty to Me	Individual	Camila		Nicole	Jenna	Britni	Rampage	Britni	Nicole
8/9	Talk Thirty to Me	Individual	Tony		Nelson	Jordan	Hunter	Rampage	Nelson	Hunter
11/12	Saved By The Bell	4 Teams of 4	Dark Blue Team		Dario	Jordan	Tony	Web of Lies	Tony	Dario
11/12	Saved By The Bell	4 Teams of 4	Dark Blue Team		Veronica	Tori	Aneesa	Web of Lies	Veronica	Aneesa
12/13	Blackout	3 Teams of 5	Green Team		—N/a					CT
12/13	Blackout	3 Teams of 5	Green Team		—N/a					Cara Maria
12/13	Blackout	3 Teams of 5	Green Team		Leroy	Derrick K.	Hunter	Body Check	Hunter	Leroy
12/13	Blackout	3 Teams of 5	Green Team		Jemmye	Jenna	Camila	Body Check	Camila	Jemmye
14	Backstabber	Individual	Hunter		—N/a					Jordan
14	Backstabber	Individual	Hunter		—N/a					Veronica
14	Backstabber	Individual	Jenna		Camila	Tori	Britni	The Reel World	Camila	Britni
14	Backstabber	Individual	Jenna		Derrick K.	Tony	Bananas	The Reel World	Derrick K.	Bananas
15/16	X Marks the Spot	Male/Female pairs → Individual	CT	Cara Maria	—N/a					
15/16	X Marks the Spot	Male/Female pairs → Individual	Jordan	Tori	—N/a					
15/16	Snaking Your Way Back In	Individual	Derrick K.		—N/a					Tony
15/16	Snaking Your Way Back In	Individual	Derrick K.		—N/a					Hunter
15/16	Snaking Your Way Back In	Individual	Camila		—N/a					Jenna
15/16	Snaking Your Way Back In	Individual	Camila		—N/a					Kailah
16/17	Final Challenge	Male/Female pairs & Individual	Jordan		2nd place: Derrick K.; 3rd place: CT					
16/17	Final Challenge	Male/Female pairs & Individual	Camila		2nd place: Cara Maria; 3rd place: Tori					

=== Elimination progress ===
Contestants	Episodes													
Contestants	1			2/3 (Note: Briana and CT entered the competition in Episode 2. Briana arrived as a replacement for Ashley, while CT's late arrival was the result of passport issues.)	3/4	6/7	7/8	8/9	11/12 (Note: Nelson was disqualified from the competition at the end of Episode 11, after he provoked Derrick K. into a verbal and physical altercation and hitting him in the face.)	12/13	14	15/16		Finale
Camila	WIN	ADV	ADV	WIN	RISK	SAFE	WIN	WIN	WIN	ELIM	ELIM	SAFE	WIN	WINNER
Jordan	WIN	ADV	ADV	SAFE	RISK	ELIM	XX	XX	XX	WIN	LAST	WIN	ADV	WINNER
Cara Maria	SAFE	WIN	ADV	WIN	WIN	WIN	WIN	SAFE	RISK	LAST		WIN	ADV	SECOND
Derrick K.	WIN	ADV	ADV	WIN	RISK	XX	RISK	SAFE	RISK	XX	ELIM	SAFE	WIN	SECOND
CT	—N/a			WIN	WIN	WIN	WIN	SAFE	WIN	LAST		WIN	ADV	THIRD
Tori	WIN	ADV	ADV	WIN	WIN	ELIM	RISK	RISK	XX	RISK	XX	WIN	ADV	THIRD
Jenna	SAFE	SAFE	WIN	RISK	OUT	SAFE	RISK	XX	RISK	XX	WIN	SAFE	LAST	
Kailah	WIN	ADV	ADV	SAFE	ELIM	SAFE	ELIM	RISK	WIN	WIN	RISK	SAFE	LAST	
Hunter	WIN	ADV	ADV	SAFE	WIN	SAFE	ELIM	OUT	WIN	ELIM	WIN	SAFE	LAST	
Tony	SAFE	SAFE	SAVE	SAFE	OUT	RISK	SAFE	WIN	ELIM	WIN	XX	SAFE	LAST	
Bananas	WIN	ADV	ADV	WIN	RISK	SAFE	RISK	SAFE	RISK	RISK	OUT			
Britni	SAFE	WIN	ADV	ELIM	RISK	SAFE	SAFE	ELIM	RISK	WIN	OUT			
Veronica	SAFE	WIN	ADV	XX	WIN	WIN	SAFE	SAFE	ELIM	WIN	LAST			
Jemmye	SAFE	SAFE	SAVE	RISK	XX	RISK	SAFE	SAFE	RISK	OUT				
Leroy	SAFE	WIN	ADV	RISK	WIN	SAFE	WIN	SAFE	RISK	OUT				
Aneesa	WIN	ADV	ADV	SAFE	WIN	XX	OUT		OUT					
Dario	SAFE	WIN	ADV	XX	WIN	RISK	SAFE	RISK	OUT					
Nelson	SAFE	WIN	ADV	WIN	XX	WIN	SAFE	ELIM	DQ					
Nicole	SAFE	WIN	ADV	WIN	RISK	RISK	XX	OUT						
Cory	SAFE	SAFE	WIN	ELIM	WIN	SAFE	OUT							
Marie	SAFE	WIN	ADV	SAFE	WIN	OUT								
Ammo	SAFE	WIN	ADV	SAFE	ELIM	OUT								
Briana	—N/a			OUT										
Derrick H.	SAFE	WIN	ADV	OUT										
Darrell	SAFE	SAFE	LAST											
LaToya	SAFE	SAFE	LAST											
Shane	SAFE	SAFE	LAST											
Amanda	SAFE	SAFE	LAST											
Devin	SAFE	SAFE	LAST											
Simone	SAFE	SAFE	LAST											
Ashley	QUIT													

Competition
The contestant won the final challenge
The contestant did not win the final challenge
The contestant won the challenge and was safe from elimination
The contestant won safety and did not have to participate in the challenge
The contestant was protected from being eliminated by the challenge winner
The contestant was not selected for the Presidio
The contestant participated in the Double-Cross draw, but did not draw the XX card
The contestant pulled the XX card and voted someone into the Presidio
The contestant won in the Presidio
The contestant lost in the Presidio
The contestant was eliminated at the challenge site
The contestant was disqualified from the competition due to disciplinary reasons
The contestant withdrew from the competition

== Redemption house ==
=== Elimination chart ===
Episode			Winner	Eliminated
#	Redemption game		Winner	Eliminated
5 (Note: Shane and Simone were disqualified from the competition in episode 2, following an incident in the Redemption house in which they got into a physical altercation with each other. Though this incident was not recorded, there was video evidence of the fight that permanently sent both contestants home.)	Man Overboard	Qualifying Round	Darrell	Devin
5	Man Overboard	Qualifying Round	Amanda	LaToya
5	Man Overboard	Qualifying Round	Tony	Derrick H.
5	Man Overboard	Qualifying Round	Jenna	Briana
5	Man Overboard	Final Round	Tony	Darrell
5	Man Overboard	Final Round	Jenna	Amanda
10 (Note: Ammo required medical attention after he lost to Jordan in the Presidio at the end of Episode 6. Instead of going to the Redemption house, Ammo returned home, where he announced on camera that he suffered an undisclosed injury. It was later revealed that Ammo suffered from an episode of PTSD.)	Green With Envy		Hunter	Cory
10	Green With Envy		Aneesa	Nicole
10	Green With Envy		Aneesa	Marie
15	The Final Redemption Challenge			
15	The Final Redemption Challenge		Cara Maria	Britni
15	The Final Redemption Challenge		Cara Maria	Veronica
15	The Final Redemption Challenge		Cara Maria	Jemmye
15	The Final Redemption Challenge		Cara Maria	Aneesa
15	The Final Redemption Challenge		CT	Bananas
15	The Final Redemption Challenge		CT	Leroy
15	The Final Redemption Challenge		Jordan	Dario

=== Redemption progress ===
Males	Episode				
Males	5			10	15
Males	Qualifying Round		Final Round	Final Round	Final Round
CT	—N/a				WON
Jordan	—N/a				WON
Bananas	—N/a				OUT
Leroy	—N/a				OUT
Dario	—N/a				OUT
Hunter	—N/a			WON	
Cory	—N/a			OUT	
Ammo	—N/a			QUIT	
Tony	SAFE	WIN	WON		
Darrell	WIN	SAFE	OUT		
Derrick H.	SAFE	OUT			
Devin	OUT				
Shane	DQ				

Females	Episode				
Females	5			10	15
Females	Qualifying Round		Final Round	Final Round	Final Round
Cara Maria	—N/a				WON
Britni	—N/a				OUT
Veronica	—N/a				OUT
Jemmye	—N/a				OUT
Aneesa	—N/a			WON	OUT
Nicole	—N/a			OUT	
Marie	—N/a			OUT	
Jenna	SAFE	WIN	WON		
Amanda	WIN	SAFE	OUT		
Briana	SAFE	OUT			
LaToya	OUT				
Simone	DQ				

Competition
The contestant won the Redemption competition, and returned to the actual game
The contestant lost the Redemption match, and was permanently eliminated from the competition
The contestant withdrew from the competition due to injury/illness
The contestant was disqualified from the competition due to violent behavior

== Voting progress ==
Voted into Presidio	Cory; 6 of 8 votes	Kailah; 10 of 10 votes	Jordan; 4 of 4 votes	Aneesa; 4 of 4 votes	Nicole; 2 of 2 votes	Dario; 3 of 4 votes	CT; 5 of 5 votes to eliminate	Tie; Vote	Leroy; 3 of 5 votes	Jordan; 2 of 2 votes to eliminate	Camila; 2 of 2 votes
Voted into Presidio	Briana; 8 of 8 votes	Ammo; 9 of 10 votes	Marie; 4 of 4 votes	Cory; 4 of 4 votes	Nelson; 2 of 2 votes	Veronica; 3 of 4 votes	Cara Maria; 5 of 5 votes to eliminate	Jemmye; 4 of 5 votes		Veronica; 2 of 2 votes to eliminate	Derrick K. 2 of 2 votes
Contestant	Episodes										
Contestant	2/3	3/4	6	7	8/9	11/12	12/13			14	
Jordan							Cara Maria	Jemmye			
Jordan							CT	Hunter	Hunter		
Camila	Briana			Aneesa	Nicole	Veronica					
Camila	Hunter			Cory	Nelson	Dario					
Cara Maria	Briana	Kailah	Marie	Aneesa							
Cara Maria	Cory	Ammo	Jordan	Cory							
Derrick K.	Briana										
Derrick K.	Cory										
Tori	Briana	Kailah									
Tori	Cory	Ammo									
CT	Briana	Kailah	Marie	Aneesa		Veronica					
CT	Cory	Ammo	Jordan	Cory		Dario					
Jenna										Veronica	Camila
Jenna										Jordan	Derrick K.
Kailah						Veronica	Cara Maria	Jemmye			
Kailah						Dario	CT	Hunter	Hunter		
Hunter		Kailah				Jemmye				Veronica	Camila
Hunter		Ammo				Jordan				Jordan	Derrick K.
Tony					Nicole		Cara Maria	Jemmye			
Tony					Nelson		CT	Derrick K.	Leroy		
Bananas	Briana										
Bananas	Cory										
Britni							Cara Maria	Jenna			
Britni							CT	Leroy			Leroy
Veronica		Kailah	Marie				Cara Maria	Jemmye			
Veronica		Ammo	Jordan				CT	Leroy	Leroy		
Jemmye											
Leroy		Kailah		Aneesa							
Leroy		Ammo		Cory							
Aneesa		Kailah									
Aneesa		Ammo									
Dario		Kailah									
Dario		Ammo									
Nelson	Briana		Marie								
Nelson	Ammo		Jordan								
Nicole	Briana										
Nicole	Cory										
Cory		Kailah									
Cory		Bananas									
Marie		Kailah									
Marie		Ammo									
Ammo											
Briana											
Derrick H.											
Darrell											
LaToya											
Shane											
Amanda											
Devin											
Simone											
Ashley											

== Types of challenges ==
- **Bold** indicates team captains

=== Team selections ===
Contestants	Episodes														
Contestants	1		2/3	3/4	6/7	7/8	8/9	11/12	12/13	14	15/16		16/17		
Camila	Individual		Individual	Blue Team	Leroy	Dark Blue Team	Individual	Dark Blue Team	Pink Team	Individual	Derrick K.	Individual	Jordan	CT	Derrick K.
Jordan	Individual		Individual	Blue Team	Kailah	Red Team	Individual	Green Team	Green Team	Individual	Tori	Individual	Camila	Tori	
Cara Maria	Individual	Blue Team	Individual	Green Team	CT	Dark Blue Team	Individual	Light Blue Team	Blue Team		CT	Individual	Derrick K.		CT
Derrick K.	Individual		Individual	Blue Team	Aneesa	Red Team	Individual	Pink Team	Pink Team	Individual	Camila	Individual	Cara Maria		Camila
CT	N/A		Individual	Green Team	Cara Maria	Dark Blue Team	Individual	Dark Blue Team	Pink Team		Cara Maria	Individual	Tori	Camila	Cara Maria
Tori	Individual		Individual	Green Team	Tony	Red Team	Individual	Green Team	Pink Team	Individual	Jordan	Individual	CT	Jordan	
Jenna	Individual	Pink Team	Individual	Blue Team	Bananas	Red Team	Individual	Pink Team	Blue Team	Individual	Tony	Individual			
Kailah	Individual		Individual	**Blue Team**	Jordan	Light Blue Team	Individual	Dark Blue Team	Green Team	Individual	Hunter	Individual			
Hunter	Individual		Individual	Green Team	Marie	Light Blue Team	Individual	**Dark Blue Team**	Blue Team	Individual	Kailah	Individual			
Tony	Individual	Pink Team	Individual	Blue Team	Tori	Pink Team	Individual	Green Team	Green Team	Individual	Jenna	Individual			
Bananas	Individual		Individual	Blue Team	Jenna	Light Blue Team	Individual	Pink Team	Blue Team	Individual					
Britni	Individual	Blue Team	Individual	Blue Team	Cory	Green Team	Individual	**Green Team**	Green Team	Individual					
Veronica	Individual	Blue Team	Individual	Green Team	Nelson	Pink Team	Individual		Green Team	Individual					
Jemmye	Individual	Pink Team	Individual	Blue Team	Ammo	Pink Team	Individual	Light Blue Team	Blue Team						
Leroy	Individual	Blue Team	Individual	Green Team	Camila	Dark Blue Team	Individual	Light Blue Team	Pink Team						
Aneesa	Individual		Individual	Green Team	Derrick K.	Green Team		**Pink Team**							
Dario	Individual	Blue Team	Individual	**Green Team**	Nicole	Pink Team	Individual								
Nelson	Individual	Blue Team	Individual	Blue Team	Veronica	Green Team	Individual	**Light Blue Team**							
Nicole	Individual	Blue Team	Individual		Dario	Light Blue Team	Individual								
Cory	Individual	Pink Team	Individual	Green Team	Britni	Green Team									
Marie	Individual	Blue Team	Individual	Green Team	Hunter										
Ammo	Individual	Blue Team	Individual		Jemmye										
Briana	N/A		Individual												
Derrick H.	Individual	Blue Team	Individual												
Darrell	Individual	Pink Team													
LaToya	Individual	Pink Team													
Shane	Individual	Pink Team													
Amanda	Individual	Pink Team													
Devin	Individual	Pink Team													
Simone	Individual	Pink Team													
Ashley															

== Episodes ==
No. overall	No. in season	Title	Original release date	US viewers (millions)
371	1	"Thirty Rotten Scoundrels"	July 18, 2017	0.84
372	2	"Shots Fired!"	July 25, 2017	0.82
373	3	"Pride Before the Fall"	August 1, 2017	0.84
374	4	"Dirty Deeds"	August 8, 2017	0.93
375	5	"Road to Redemption"	August 15, 2017	0.88
376	6	"YAAAASS, Booty!"	August 22, 2017	0.83
377	7	"Ankles Aweigh"	August 29, 2017	0.81
378	8	"Dirty Little Secret"	September 5, 2017	0.83
379	9	"Rampage"	September 12, 2017	0.65
380	10	"Guess Who's Coming to Dinner"	September 19, 2017	0.83
381	11	"The Heart is a Lonely Hunter"	September 26, 2017	0.74
382	12	"Boxed In"	October 3, 2017	0.91
383	13	"Feel The Burn"	October 10, 2017	0.81
384	14	"Pretty Little Backstabbers"	October 17, 2017	0.77
385	15	"A Million More Reasons"	October 24, 2017	0.76
386	16	"The Sinister Six"	October 31, 2017	0.64
387	17	"One in a Million"	November 7, 2017	0.71

=== Reunion special ===
The two-part reunion special/finale aired on November 14 and 21, 2017, and was hosted by WWE pro wrestler, The Real World: Back to New York alumnus, and Challenge champion Mike "The Miz" Mizanin. Host T. J. Lavin and each cast member, for the exceptions of Camila and LaToya, attended at the Capitale in New York. A The Final Dirt special showing behind-the-scenes at the reunion and the reunion's after-party aired on November 28, 2017.

== Controversy ==
After winning the daily challenge on episode 8, cast member Camila Nakagawa overheard Leroy Garrett mentioning a woman to other contestants. Nakagawa angrily assumed he was referring to her; she confronted Garrett and started verbally attacking him, using racial slurs. After the episode aired, Nakagawa posted an apology on her social media. The incident was later discussed on an MTV special that followed called Race in America: An MTV Discussion hosted by Nessa.

In November 2021, after he stopped appearing in the competition series, Garrett spoke about the incident on his social media. Garrett criticised MTV for their handling of the situation, expressing to the network that "[...] someone should have stepped in [...] And the fact that no one did, I felt like MTV, you dropped the ball". The network and the show's production company released a statement in which they apologized to Garrett for not taking action and allowing Nakagawa to remain in the competition after her racist outburst.
