= The Challenge: Rivals III =

28th season of the reality television series

Rivals III
- Season 28
- Presented by: T. J. Lavin
- No. of contestants: 28
- Winners: Johnny "Bananas" Devenanzio; Sarah Rice
- Location: Huatulco, Mexico; Mendoza, Argentina
- No. of episodes: 15 (Reunion Included)

Release
- Original network: MTV
- Original release: May 4 – August 3, 2016

Season chronology
- ← Previous; Battle of the Bloodlines Next → Invasion of the Champions

The Challenge: Rivals III is the 28th season of the MTV reality game show The Challenge. Being the third in the Rivals series, Rivals III marks the show's third trilogy (following The Inferno and The Gauntlet), continuing on from the original Rivals and Rivals II. It was filmed in Huatulco, Mexico, and Mendoza, Argentina, during November and December 2015, with cast members from The Real World, The Challenge, and Are You the One? competing. This season marks the first since season 11 to not feature any original cast members from the Fresh Meat or Fresh Meat II seasons.

Unlike the previous two installments of the Rivals series, which featured same-gender pairs, Rivals III saw a change in format, with male/female pairs that had bitter feuds, fights, or strained relationships in previous seasons of Real World, The Challenge, and Are You the One? (similar to the Battle of the Exes series). Unlike the other Rivals seasons, only the winning team from each week's challenge was allowed to decide which team would face the last-place team in the elimination round. The season premiered with a special 90 minutes episode on May 4, 2016, and concluded its run on August 3, 2016, with the Reunion special.

Lisa Fletcher replaced longtime Challenge producer Justin Booth as executive producer this season. Booth had served as the executive producer since season 15.

== Format ==
Each team participates in numerous challenges (sometimes called "missions"), which are followed by an elimination round — "The Jungle." The winning team of each challenge is safe from elimination, while the last-place finisher is automatically sent to The Jungle. The winning team also earns the right of choosing two teams that will face the last-place finisher in The Jungle. Prior to The Jungle, the two teams nominated by the winning team participate in an elimination draw in which all four participants either draw one of three white skulls or one black skull out of a bag (similar to the Free Agents season). If a participant draws a black skull, their team will face the last-place finisher in The Jungle.

Unlike the original Rivals and Rivals II seasons, both of which featured same-gender pairs, no money is awarded to a gender-specific first-place finisher after each mission, as this season features male/female pairs. At the end of the season, three teams will compete in the final challenge for a share of a $350,000 prize — the first-place team wins $275,000, second-place wins $50,000 and third-place wins $25,000. However, in episode 13, a twist revealed that one partner has a choice between keeping all the money to themselves, or sharing it with their partner.

== Contestants ==
Male contestants	Original season	Finish
Johnny "Bananas" Devenanzio	The Real World: Key West	Winner (Note: During the final challenge, Johnny scored more points than her partner Sarah, and thus made the decision to take all of the monetary prize for himself.)
Vince Gliatta	The Challenge: Battle of the Bloodlines	Runner-up
Devin Walker-Molaghan (Note: After losing in the first Jungle, Devin & Cheyenne were brought back to the competition prior to the second Jungle as a replacement team for Brandon & Briana.)	Are You the One? 3	Third place
Dario Medrano	Are You the One? 2	Episode 13
Wes Bergmann	The Real World: Austin	Episode 12
Nate Siebenmark	Are You the One? 2	Episode 11
Cory Wharton	Real World: Ex-Plosion	Episode 11
Jamie Banks	The Challenge: Battle of the Bloodlines	Episode 9
Tony Raines	Real World: Skeletons	Episode 8 (Note: Prior to the "Up All Night" challenge in episode 8, Tony & Camila were disqualified from the competition after they engaged in a drunken, disorderly and near-violent altercation with each other.)
Nelson Thomas (Note: Nelson & Amanda were brought into the competition prior to the "Dirty Laundry" challenge in episode 3, as a replacement team for Leroy & Averey.)	Are You the One? 3	Episode 7
Thomas Buell	Real World: Ex-Plosion	Episode 6 (Note: Thomas & Simone were nominated for the Jungle in episode 6. However, due to a personal emergency back home, Thomas quit the game, and Simone was sent home as a result of being his partner. The Skull draw was still held, but both Wes & Nany drew a white skull and were safe from elimination.)
Johnny Reilly	The Real World: Portland	Episode 5
Brandon Tindel	Are You the One? 2	Episode 4 (Note: Prior to the "Out On A Limb" challenge in episode 4, Brandon quit the game due to homesickness. Briana was sent home as the result of being Brandon's partner.)
Leroy Garrett	The Real World: Las Vegas (2011)	Episode 2 (Note: Leroy & Averey were removed from the competition in episode 2 due to injury. Leroy initially revealed in episode 1 that he was suffering from a pinched nerve in his back, though he and Averey participated in the "Give Me Some Slack" challenge. Prior to the first Jungle nomination in episode 2, Leroy was deemed medically unable to continue competing, and Averey was sent home as the result of being Leroy's partner.)

Female contestants	Original season	Finish
Sarah Rice	The Real World: Brooklyn	Winner
Jenna Compono	Real World: Ex-Plosion	Runner-up
Cheyenne Floyd	Are You the One? 3	Third place
Nicole Ramos	The Challenge: Battle of the Bloodlines	Episode 13
Nany González	The Real World: Las Vegas (2011)	Episode 12
Christina LeBlanc	Are You the One? 2	Episode 11
Ashley Mitchell	Real World: Ex-Plosion	Episode 11
KellyAnne Judd	The Real World: Sydney	Episode 9
Camila Nakagawa	Spring Break Challenge	Episode 8
Amanda Garcia	Are You the One? 3	Episode 7
Simone Kelly	Are You the One? 1	Episode 6
Jessica McCain	The Real World: Portland	Episode 5
Briana LaCuesta	Are You the One? 2	Episode 4
Averey Tressler	The Real World: Portland	Episode 2

=== Teams ===
Male partner	Female partner	Team
Johnny "Bananas" Devenanzio	Sarah Rice	Bananas & Sarah
Brandon Tindel	Briana LaCuesta	Brandon & Briana
Cory Wharton	Ashley Mitchell	Cory & Ashley
Dario Medrano	Nicole Ramos	Dario & Nicole
Devin Walker-Molaghan	Cheyenne Floyd	Devin & Cheyenne
Jamie Banks	KellyAnne Judd	Jamie & KellyAnne
Johnny Reilly	Jessica McCain	Johnny & Jessica
Leroy Garrett	Averey Tressler	Leroy & Averey
Nathan "Nate" Siebenmark	Christina LeBlanc	Nate & Christina
Nelson Thomas	Amanda Garcia	Nelson & Amanda
Thomas Buell	Simone Kelly	Thomas & Simone
Tony Raines	Camila Nakagawa	Tony & Camila
Vince Gliatta	Jenna Compono	Vince & Jenna
Wes Bergmann	Nany González	Wes & Nany

=== Pre-season rivalry backgrounds ===
- Bananas & Sarah: The two entered Battle of the Exes II with a long-running friendship. During that season, however, Sarah played the game to win, and fought to remove her toughest competition from the game, aligning herself with two power teams on opposing sides: Bananas (and Nany) and Wes (and Theresa). After Bananas re-entered from "Ex-ile" after being eliminated, they continued to work together until Sarah nominated him for the final Dome elimination. Bananas and his partner Nany then lost in the Dome and were eliminated.
- Brandon & Briana: Briana disagreed with the way Brandon was playing the game during their season of Are You the One?, especially with Brandon's unwillingness to separate from Christina. Brandon then called out Briana for doing almost the same with Curtis Hadzicki. Ironically, Brandon and Briana are each other's perfect match.
- Cory & Ashley: The pair met as roommates during the Real World: Ex-Plosion. They got along until Ashley got drunk and disrespected Cory by telling him she could "buy his family". After that night, they continued to be on bad terms. After Ashley faced disagreements with many housemates, she left the residence and said she would only return if the other roommates wanted her there. Cory was one of the four housemates to vote Ashley out, leading to her voluntary departure.
- Dario & Nicole: The two got into an argument on Battle of the Bloodlines where Dario tried voting Nicole's cousin Nany into The Pit.
- Devin & Cheyenne: The two got into multiple fights on the third season of Are You the One?, as a result of Cheyenne taking exception to the way Devin treated women in the house.
- Jamie & KellyAnne: The two engaged in an argument during Battle of the Bloodlines, after KellyAnne's cousin unsuccessfully tried to throw a challenge ("Too Clingy") in an attempt to save KellyAnne from The Pit.
- Johnny & Jessica: Jessica never got along with Johnny and Averey Tressler during The Real World: Portland, and got into multiple verbal fights where Johnny made denigrating remarks regarding Jessica's weight, and Jessica made fun of Johnny's penis size. Jessica also sided with Nia Moore during a tense night out between Nia and Averey. Johnny disapproved of Jessica's refusal to condemn Nia's behavior in the house, including refusing to vote Nia out of the house. Their rivalry continued on Free Agents, where Jessica voted for Johnny to go into the elimination round.
- Leroy & Averey: Leroy & Nia Moore eliminated Averey & Johnny Reilly on Battle of the Exes II. On an episode of the aftershow, Leroy stated that he believed Johnny's side of the story regarding Johnny and Averey's breakup.
- Nate & Christina: The two began to grow close on their season of Are You The One?, with both feeling that they could be a perfect match. However, when it was discovered that they were not, the ease with which Christina decided to go back to Brandon Tindel infuriated Nate, causing him to belittle her and claim her feelings for him were never real. Christina, in turn, started an actual relationship with Brandon.
- Nelson & Amanda: During Are You The One? 3, Nelson was repulsed by Amanda's loud and obnoxious behavior. He also had taken the side of another housemate who had gotten aggressive with Amanda due to her behavior and refusal to leave the other person alone.
- Thomas & Simone: The pair engaged in a verbal altercation during Battle of the Exes II, which featured Simone splashing drinks in Thomas' face. This fight had gone unaired on the actual season, but was partially shown in the trailer.
- Tony & Camila: The two got into a verbal argument on Battle of the Bloodlines after Camila was informed that Tony called her sister Larissa "short, weak, and that she would be the first person eliminated from the game." Tony defended himself by calling it lies, but later he confessed that he was being sarcastic. The fight escalated when Nicole Ramos stepped in the defense of the Nakagawa sisters, and Nany González came in the defense of her bloodline Nicole. The fight was stopped with Tony walking away and Camila crying because she didn't want her sister to be bullied by anyone.
- Vince & Jenna: Jenna was annoyed by Vince during Battle of the Bloodlines. Vince (and his bloodline Bananas) also threw Jenna (and her bloodline Brianna Julig) into every elimination possible, but Jenna always came back and made it further in the game than Vince.
- Wes & Nany: The two were rarely aligned on The Challenge: on The Challenge: Battle of the Seasons, Nany's team was part of an alliance that worked to eliminate Wes and his team early in the game; on The Challenge: Rivals II, Wes and CT Tamburello voted Nany and Jonna Mannion into elimination where they lost; most notably, they were on rival teams on Battle of the Exes II, where Wes and Theresa sent Nany and Bananas into the Dome versus their allies Leroy Garrett and Nia Moore. Nany and Bananas were eliminated, but later re-entered the game via the "Battle of the Ex-iled" twist. Later in the game, Wes and Theresa were sent into an elimination against Leroy and Nia. During the "Hall Brawl" elimination, Wes was injured after being run into by Leroy, to which Nany laughed and taunted Wes as payback for their earlier animosity in the game.

== Gameplay ==
=== Challenge games ===
- Give Me Some Slack: A platform is suspended 400 feet above the ocean. A series of five skulls is dangling from the platform. The girls are positioned outward at one plank, facing the dangling skulls, while their male partners are positioned on the other side of the platform, holding a rope that is attached to the backs of their female partners. The goal is for each girl to lean forward and retrieve as many skulls as possible, or in the fastest time, and deposit the skulls into their team bucket. Each successive skull becomes more difficult for each girl to reach, and a team is disqualified if the female partner falls off the plank. The team to retrieve the most skulls wins, while the last-place finisher is automatically sent to The Jungle.
  - Winners: Vince & Jenna
- Dirty Laundry: Teams are positioned on a pole within a giant tub. The pole is coated with a bar of soap. Each team must use friction with their bodies (in a suggestive manner) in order to erode the soap and reveal four numbers on the wheel. Each team then runs toward a "clothesline" and a bucket full of T-shirts with numbers on them, and must dig through the bucket, then find the four T-shirts with the correct numbers, then hang the T-shirts on a clothesline.
  - Winners: N/A (Note: No Jungle nomination was held following the "Dirty Laundry" challenge in Episode 3. In addition, no winning or losing team was announced.)
- Out On A Limb: A structure, with four platforms, is suspended 30 feet above the water. Each team must advance in unison from platform to platform by using a swinging bar, and ring the bell at the end of the last platform. Each successive platform becomes farther and more difficult for each team to reach. The team to advance the farthest or ring the bell in the fastest time wins, while the last-place team is automatically sent to The Jungle.
  - Winners: Cory & Ashley
- Laps of Judgement: Just like a game of "Would You Rather...", teams have two options at five checkpoints. After each checkpoint is completed, each team grabs a token and runs up a hill and has to scale up a wall. After they put their token on their designated team rack, they have to race down the hill and repeat the process. The first team to obtain all five tokens wins the challenge.
  - Round 1: Would You Rather... Eat Brains? or Eat Balls? Teams have to pick between eating cow brains or bull testicles.
  - Round 2: Would You Rather... Reel It In? or Rock It Out? Teams must choose between lassoing and pulling in a 150 lb. drum, or tossing and landing five rocks on top of a drum.
  - Round 3: Would You Rather... Be Sleepy? or Be Tired? Teams must choose between carrying a queen size mattress up the hill, or carrying five tires up the hill. (Note: After Vince & Jenna finished Round 3, T. J. Lavin explained that they accidentally took Dario & Nicole's mattress. Due to that mistake, they had to take their mattress up the hill.)
  - Round 4: Would You Rather... Build a Bridge? or Build a House? Teams must choose between completing a bridge or a house out of tangram puzzle pieces.
  - Round 5: Would You Rather... Eat a Birthday Cake? or Be in your Birthday Suit? Teams must choose between eating an entire birthday cake, or racing up the paved path naked.
  - Winners: Bananas & Sarah
- Road To Nowhere: A platform, with a runway, is suspended 400 feet above the ocean. Each team rides a cart toward the end of the runway, where a series of green, yellow and red flags are standing. Teammates try to collect as many flags as possible, before riding off the platform. Each flag is worth a series of points — 5 points for green, 10 points for yellow and 15 points for red; the latter two colored flags are more difficult for each team to retrieve. The team to collect the most points in the fastest time wins, while the last-place finisher is automatically sent to The Jungle.
  - Winners: Nate & Christina
- Up All Night: Partners have to stand next to each other at the Jungle site on boxes overnight, and memorize certain details of the events that occur, which includes a mariachi band's performance, a taco truck and a man catching fire. Once an air horn sounds, each team is required to step down to a smaller box, making it more challenging because of the lack of sleep. No sitting or leaning is allowed, and the first team to have one player fall off or step off the boxes is automatically sent to the Jungle. When morning arrives, teams attempt to solve a puzzle based on the previous evening's events. The first team to correctly solve their puzzle is safe from elimination and wins $1,000 each. The winning team also selects two teams to go on a day trip with them.
  - Winners: Bananas & Sarah
- Take It to the Grave: Prior to this challenge, all of the girls were separated from their male partners, and secretly asked a series of questions regarding fellow contestants, and were "buried alive" in the sand in coffins. When all of their male partners arrive at the challenge, the guys are asked a series of trivia questions with the goal of matching the answers of their female partners. A correct answer allows a guy to move forward and closer to digging their female partner out from her grave. If the answer is wrong, that guy stays put. Once a guy has dug his female partner out from her grave, they race to ring a bell. The first team to ring the bell wins, while the last-place team is automatically sent to the Jungle.
  - Winners: Dario & Nicole
- Catch & Release: A pair of structures are suspended 30 feet above water. The girls are positioned at the top of one structure, while their male partners are positioned below them. The girls start swinging a bag attached to a rope, and have to gain enough momentum in order for their male partners to jump on the bags, and swing from one platform to another, where a series of yellow flags are hanging. The process continues for ten minutes, and the guy who grabs the most flags wins for their team, while the last-place team is automatically sent to the Jungle.
  - Winners: Bananas & Sarah
- Bridging the Gap: Teams have to build a bridge by using planks with cutouts of various shapes. Before gaining access to the planks, each partner must complete a series of tasks — braiding/unbraiding a rope and completing 30 consecutive jumps using a jump rope — while having to move in unison and banded together in a poncho. After completing a task, there are three different sets of planks that are puzzle pieces in which teams have to determine where to place them on their designated bridge. The first team to complete their bridge wins, while the last-place team is automatically going into the Jungle.
  - Winners: Bananas & Sarah

=== Jungle games ===
- Back It Up: Teams have to shimmy their way up a wall while facing each other, transfer ceramic pottery on their laps, and deposit the pottery into a cargo net through a hole at the top of the wall. If a team drops a piece of pottery, they have to start over at ground level. The first team to deposit three pieces of pottery through their designated hole in the wall wins.
  - Played by: Johnny & Jessica vs. Devin & Cheyenne
- Weight For Me: The guys use a pulley system connected to their female partner on the other side of a wall. The object is for the women to memorize a tile puzzle at the top of the wall and piece it together at the bottom of the wall. The first team to complete their puzzle wins.
  - Played by: Nelson & Amanda vs. Johnny & Jessica
- Chill Out: Teams have to build a puzzle, featuring a series of wooden planks and discs, while moving back and forth from an ice tub. To start, each team sit in the tub for one minute, then try to stack their puzzle pieces until it reaches the height at their designated station. If the puzzle is not solved within two minutes, teams must return to their ice tub for another minute, the process continues until the first team to correctly solve their puzzle wins.
  - Played by: Jamie & KellyAnne vs. Nelson & Amanda
- Hear Me Out: Teams engage in a soccer match within a large square, while blindfolded. Played in same-gender rounds and a best-of-three, each player is guided by their partners, who are standing outside of the arena. The first team to win two rounds wins. In the event of a tie after the first two rounds, a coin flip occur to determine which gender competes in the tiebreaker round.
  - Played by: Wes & Nany vs. Jamie & KellyAnne
- Spun Out: Players spin a turnstile attached to a rope, with their partners suspended above the ground. When one player spins the spool on ground level, the rope tightens, which makes it more difficult for their partner to hang on to their crossbar that is attached to a lifeline. The goal is for the player suspended above ground to hang on to their crossbar longer than their opponent. The team that win two rounds wins.
  - Played by: Nate & Christina vs. Cory & Ashley
- Shattered Dreams: The girls crank a spool that is attached to a battering ram. Their male partners use a pair of ropes attached to the battering ram, and aim the battering ram to swing toward a series of nine windows on a wall. Teammates have to synchronize in order to use the proper height to shatter all nine windows. The first team to shatter all nine windows wins.
  - Played by: Wes & Nany vs. Nate & Christina
- Tunnel Vision: Players from each team must crawl through a tunnel in the sand, then try to pass each other in the middle, then race to the opposite side to ring a bell to earn a point for their team. Played in same-gender tests, the first team to earn two points wins.
  - Played by: Dario & Nicole vs. Wes & Nany
- Don't Whine for Me, Argentina: Teams have to transfer six wine barrels from a vineyard to a wine barrel rack. Each team has to correctly solve a riddle at their team podium prior to racing to the vineyard, and then haul the heavy wine barrels back to the racks. The first team to transfer all of their barrels to the racks wins.
  - Played by: Bananas & Sarah vs. Dario & Nicole

=== Final challenge ===
Prior to the final challenge, it is revealed that not only would each team be competing against the other teams, but they would also have to compete against their fellow team members through a series of checkpoints. Each in-team victor would eventually be presented with an ultimate choice at the game's end: split the money with his/her partner, or take it all for him or herself.

The first checkpoint involved untangling coiled wires. Sarah & Bananas finished the checkpoint first (Sarah got the point), with Vince & Jenna coming in second, and Devin & Cheyenne coming in last. Vince & Jenna arrived at the second checkpoint first. The checkpoint was a giant memory game. Bananas & Sarah were the first team to complete the checkpoint (Bananas finished first and got the point). Vince & Jenna were second, and Devin & Cheyenne were last. Checkpoint 3 was a two-dimensional, life-sized puzzle. Vince finished first but Bananas & Sarah were actually the first team to finish the third checkpoint. Sarah finished before Bananas, so she got the point. Cheyenne finished before Devin, getting a point compared to Devin's two. Vince and Jenna edged out Bananas & Sarah on a subsequent run to finish out the first day. To end the day, each team member took turns staying up at night (whichever team member stayed up the longest earned 2 points). The second day consisted of eating distasteful food to earn points, and then a climb up the rest of the mountain to the finish line. By the end of day two, Bananas & Sarah took first place (Bananas had more points), Vince & Jenna took second (Vince had more points), and Devin & Cheyenne finished in last (Devin had more points). The final checkpoint involved climbing a mountain, and whichever team arrived at the summit first was the winner of Rivals III.

- Winners: Bananas & Sarah (Bananas had the most points at the end and decided to keep all the money for himself)
- Second place: Vince & Jenna (Vince had the most points at the end and decided to split the money with Jenna)
- Third place: Devin & Cheyenne (Devin had the most points at the end and decided to split the money with Cheyenne)

== Game summary ==
Episode		Winners	Jungle contestants				Jungle games	Jungle outcome	
#	Challenge	Winners	Last-place	Winners' pick	White Skull pick	Black Skull pick	Jungle games	Winners	Eliminated
1/2	Give Me Some Slack	Vince & Jenna	Johnny & Jessica	Brandon & Briana	Brandon & Briana	Devin & Cheyenne	Back It Up	Johnny & Jessica	Devin & Cheyenne
1/2	Give Me Some Slack	Vince & Jenna	Johnny & Jessica	Devin & Cheyenne	Brandon & Briana	Devin & Cheyenne	Back It Up	Johnny & Jessica	Devin & Cheyenne
3	Dirty Laundry	—N/a							
4/5	Out On a Limb	Cory & Ashley	Johnny & Jessica	Nelson & Amanda	Thomas & Simone	Nelson & Amanda	Weight For Me	Nelson & Amanda	Johnny & Jessica
4/5	Out On a Limb	Cory & Ashley	Johnny & Jessica	Thomas & Simone	Thomas & Simone	Nelson & Amanda	Weight For Me	Nelson & Amanda	Johnny & Jessica
6	Laps of Judgement	Bananas & Sarah	Tony & Camila (Note: Nate & Christina finished last in the "Laps of Judgment" challenge in episode 6 after losing one of their tokens. At the end of the challenge, Nate & Christina asked if any one of the teams had taken their token by accident, but no one said they had it. However, at the nomination ceremony, it was revealed that Tony & Camila sabotaged Nate & Christina's missing token. As a result, Tony & Camila were disqualified and automatically sent into the Jungle instead of Nate & Christina.)	Wes & Nany	Wes & Nany	—N/a			
6	Laps of Judgement	Bananas & Sarah	Tony & Camila	Thomas & Simone	Wes & Nany	—N/a			
7	Road to Nowhere	Nate & Christina	Jamie & KellyAnne	Nelson & Amanda	Devin & Cheyenne	Nelson & Amanda	Chill Out	Jamie & KellyAnne	Nelson & Amanda
7	Road to Nowhere	Nate & Christina	Jamie & KellyAnne	Devin & Cheyenne	Devin & Cheyenne	Nelson & Amanda	Chill Out	Jamie & KellyAnne	Nelson & Amanda
8/9	Up All Night	Bananas & Sarah	Wes & Nany	Devin & Cheyenne	Devin & Cheyenne	Jamie & KellyAnne	Hear Me Out	Wes & Nany	Jamie & KellyAnne
8/9	Up All Night	Bananas & Sarah	Wes & Nany	Jamie & KellyAnne	Devin & Cheyenne	Jamie & KellyAnne	Hear Me Out	Wes & Nany	Jamie & KellyAnne
10/11	Take It to the Grave	Dario & Nicole	Nate & Christina	Cory & Ashley	Devin & Cheyenne	Cory & Ashley	Spun Out	Nate & Christina	Cory & Ashley
10/11	Take It to the Grave	Dario & Nicole	Nate & Christina	Devin & Cheyenne	Devin & Cheyenne	Cory & Ashley	Spun Out	Nate & Christina	Cory & Ashley
11	Catch & Release	Bananas & Sarah	Nate & Christina	Wes & Nany	Devin & Cheyenne	Wes & Nany	Shattered Dreams	Wes & Nany	Nate & Christina
11	Catch & Release	Bananas & Sarah	Nate & Christina	Devin & Cheyenne	Devin & Cheyenne	Wes & Nany	Shattered Dreams	Wes & Nany	Nate & Christina
12	Bridging The Gap	Bananas & Sarah	Dario & Nicole	Wes & Nany	Devin & Cheyenne	Wes & Nany	Tunnel Vision	Dario & Nicole	Wes & Nany
12	Bridging The Gap	Bananas & Sarah	Dario & Nicole	Devin & Cheyenne	Devin & Cheyenne	Wes & Nany	Tunnel Vision	Dario & Nicole	Wes & Nany
13	—N/a (Note: No challenge was held prior to the Final Cork selections, and no team had immunity from the final Cork draw.)				Devin & Cheyenne	Bananas & Sarah	Don't Wine For Me, Argentina	Bananas & Sarah	Dario & Nicole
13	—N/a				Vince & Jenna	Dario & Nicole	Don't Wine For Me, Argentina	Bananas & Sarah	Dario & Nicole
13/14	Final Challenge	Bananas & Sarah	2nd place: Vince & Jenna; 3rd place: Devin & Cheyenne						

=== Elimination progress ===
Teams	Episodes										
Teams	1/2	3	4/5	6	7	8/9	10/11	11	12	13	Finale
Bananas & Sarah	SAFE	SAFE	SAFE	WIN	SAFE	WIN	SAFE	WIN	WIN	ELIM	WINNERS
Vince & Jenna	WIN	SAFE	SAFE	SAFE	SAFE	SAFE	SAFE	SAFE	SAFE	RISK	SECOND
Devin & Cheyenne	OUT			SAFE	RISK	RISK	RISK	RISK	RISK	RISK	THIRD
Dario & Nicole	SAFE	SAFE	SAFE	SAFE	SAFE	SAFE	WIN	SAFE	ELIM	OUT	
Wes & Nany	SAFE	WON	SAFE	RISK	SAFE	ELIM	SAFE	ELIM	OUT		
Nate & Christina	SAFE	WON	SAFE	SAFE	WIN	SAFE	ELIM	OUT			
Cory & Ashley	SAFE	SAFE	WIN	SAFE	SAFE	SAFE	OUT				
Jamie & KellyAnne	SAFE	SAFE	SAFE	SAFE	ELIM	OUT					
Tony & Camila	SAFE	WON	SAFE	SAVE	SAFE	DQ					
Nelson & Amanda	—N/a	SAFE	ELIM	SAFE	OUT						
Thomas & Simone	SAFE	SAFE	RISK	QUIT							
Johnny & Jessica	ELIM	SAFE	OUT								
Brandon & Briana	RISK	SAFE	QUIT								
Leroy & Averey	MED										

Competition
The team won the final challenge
The team lost the final challenge
The team won the challenge and was safe from the Jungle
The team won their heat in the challenge but the final result was not revealed
The team was not selected for the Jungle
The team was selected for the Jungle, but pulled a white skull and was safe
The team was selected for the Jungle, but did not have to compete
The team won in the Jungle
The team lost in the Jungle
A contestant was removed from the competition due to medical reasons, so his/her partner was also eliminated
A contestant withdrew from the competition, so his/her partner was also eliminated
The team was disqualified from the competition due to disciplinary reasons

== Episodes ==
No. overall	No. in season	Title	Original release date	US viewers (millions)
343	1	"Mexican Standoff"	May 4, 2016	0.66
344	2	"The Curse of the Black Skull"	May 11, 2016	0.70
345	3	"The Replacements"	May 18, 2016	0.73
346	4	"I'm Going Home"	May 25, 2016	0.84
347	5	"Where The Ratchet Things Are"	June 1, 2016	0.73
348	6	"The Naked Truth"	June 8, 2016	0.74
349	7	"Camilanator: Salvation"	June 15, 2016	0.78
350	8	"Stand By Me"	June 22, 2016	0.86
351	9	"Let Sleeping Dogs Wake"	June 29, 2016	0.84
352	10	"Digging Your Own Grave"	July 6, 2016	0.92
353	11	"Rivals: Civil War"	July 13, 2016	0.76
354	12	"Raging Bullies"	July 20, 2016	0.80
355	13	"Grapes. Wrath."	July 27, 2016	0.68
356	14	"Split Decision"	August 3, 2016	0.72

=== Reunion special ===
The Reunion special aired on August 3, 2016, following the season finale and was hosted by Nessa. The cast members who attended the reunion were Bananas, Sarah, Vince, Jenna, Devin, Cheyenne, Dario, Nicole, Wes, Nany, Nate, Cory, Ashley, and Camila.
