= Ex on the Beach (American TV series) =

American reality television series

- Genre: Reality; Dating show
- Based on: Ex on the Beach
- Presented by: Romeo Miller; Kamie Crawford
- Starring: List of cast members
- Narrated by: Welborn Ferrene
- Country of origin: United States
- Original language: English
- No. of seasons: 6
- No. of episodes: 77 (list of episodes)

Production
- Executive producers: Dan Caster; Keith Burke; Lily Neumeyer; Lisa Chapman; Malcolm Gerrie; Matt Anderson; Nate Green; Nina L. Diaz; Richard Hall; Tara Long; Liz Chapetta; Cooper Green; Diana Morelli
- Running time: 60 minutes (including commercials)
- Production companies: Entertainment One Television; Purveyors of Pop; Whizz Kid Entertainment; MTV Entertainment Studios (season 5–6)

Original release
- Network: MTV
- Release: April 19, 2018 – April 27, 2023

Ex on the Beach is an American reality television series, based on the British series of the same name. The series was announced on March 15, 2018 and premiered on MTV on Thursday, April 19.

== Production ==
The first four seasons of the series were hosted by rapper Romeo Miller.

On March 10, 2022, the series was renewed for a fifth and a sixth season, with the fifth season premiering later that month, on March 31, 2022.

In April 2022, MTV released a casting call for the sixth season, and also announced a new format for the show, featuring couples instead of singles. The season, titled Ex on the Beach Couples: Now or Never (hosted by Kamie Crawford) premiered on February 9, 2023.

== Series overview ==
Season	Episodes	Originally released	
Season	Episodes	First released	Last released
1	11	April 19, 2018	June 28, 2018
2	14	December 20, 2018	April 4, 2019
3	14	July 16, 2019	October 24, 2019
4	14	December 5, 2019	February 27, 2020
5	12	March 31, 2022	June 16, 2022
6	12	February 9, 2023	April 27, 2023
