= Are You the One? (German TV series) =

German reality television series

- Genre: Reality
- Presented by: Jan Köppen (1); Sophia Thomalla (2–)
- Opening theme: "Nice to Meet Ya" by Niall Horan
- Country of origin: Germany
- Original language: German
- No. of seasons: 8
- No. of episodes: 160+6

Original release
- Network: RTL+ RTL
- Release: April 14, 2020 – present

Related
- Are You the One?

Are You the One? is a German reality television series on the premium sector RTL+ and on the television channel RTL, in which young singles try to find love. The show premiered on April 14, 2020, on RTL+ and on May 6, 2020, on RTL. Season 7 is being shot in Koh Samui, Thailand.

A group of 10 single women and 10 single men are secretly paired into couples by Experts, via a matchmaking algorithm. Then, while living together, the contestants try to identify all of these "perfect matches". If they succeed, the entire group shares a prize of up to €200,000. Over the course of each season, the contestants go on dates with partners determined by competitions, and have the opportunity to learn in the "truth booth" if a given couple is a correct match. Once the truth booth confirms a perfect match, that couple will go to the honeymoon suite and will automatically be paired up for the remainder of the matching nights. At the end of each episode, the contestants pair up in a "matching night" and learn how many perfect matches they have, but not which matches are correct. The prize was reduced any time that the house failed to identify any matches other than those already confirmed via the truth booth.

== Series overview ==
Season	Originally aired (RTL+)		Originally aired (RTL)		Number of cast members	All Perfect Matches Found?	Total Money Won
Season	Season premiere	Season finale	Season premiere	Season finale	Number of cast members	All Perfect Matches Found?	Total Money Won
1	April 14, 2020	June 16, 2020	May 6, 2020	July 12, 2020	20	✓	€200,000
2	January 21, 2021	March 25, 2021	January 31, 2021	—N/a	21	✓	€170,000
3	December 14, 2021	February 15, 2022	—N/a	—N/a	21	✓	€200.000
4	December 6, 2022	February 7, 2023	—N/a	—N/a	20	✓	€200.000
5	November 17, 2023	January 18, 2024	—N/a	—N/a	22	✗	€220.000
6	February 4, 2025	tba	—N/a	—N/a	21	TBA	200.000

== Seasons ==
=== Season 1 – South Africa ===
Filmed in South Africa

==== Cast ====
Guys
Cast member	Age	Hometown
Aleks	28	Mülheim
Axel	25	Düsseldorf
Dominic	24	Berlin
Edin^{1}	24	Stuttgart
Elisha	32	Berlin
Ferhat	27	Cologne
Juliano	21	Erlangen
Kevin	21	Soest
Laurin	22	Mönchengladbach
Mo	34	Munich
René	28	Graz

Girls
Cast member	Age	Hometown
Aline	33	Cologne
Ivana	28	Baden
Katharina "Kathi"	24	Kamen
Laura	29	Essen
Luisa	23	Würzburg
Madleine	26	Bielefeld
Melissa	23	Berlin
Michelle	24	Herzogenrath
Nadine	25	Berlin
Sabrina	30	London

===== Notes =====
1. Edin joined in Episode 11.

==== Progress ====
Guys	Matching Night									
Guys	1	2	3	4	5	6	7	8	9	10
Aleks	Sabrina	Nadine	Nadine	Sabrina	Madleine	Madleine	Madleine	Kathi	Kathi	Laura
Axel	Luisa	Madleine	Madleine	Ivana	Michelle	Luisa	Luisa	Luisa	Luisa	Luisa
Dominic	Melissa	Sabrina	Sabrina	Nadine	Ivana	Sabrina	Sabrina	Sabrina	Ivana	Ivana
Edin	Not in the Game					Laura	N/A	Madleine	N/A	Madleine
Elisha	Nadine	Ivana	Ivana	Michelle	Sabrina	Nadine	Kathi	N/A	Sabrina	Sabrina
Ferhat	Laura	Aline	Michelle	Madleine	Luisa	N/A	Nadine	Nadine	Nadine	Nadine
Juliano	Ivana	Laura	Laura	Kathi	Laura	Ivana	Laura	Laura	Laura	Madleine
Kevin	Aline	Kathi	Kathi	Laura	Kathi	Kathi	Ivana	Ivana	Madleine	Kathi
Laurin	Madleine	Melissa	Melissa	Melissa	Melissa	Melissa	Melissa	Melissa	Melissa	Melissa
Mo	Michelle	Michelle	Aline	Aline	Aline	Aline	Aline	Aline	Aline	Aline
René	Kathi	Luisa	Luisa	Luisa	Nadine	Michelle	Michelle	Michelle	Michelle	Michelle
Correct Matches	1	2	3	2 (BLACK OUT)	5	5	5	6	7	10

Girls	Matching Night									
Girls	1	2	3	4	5	6	7	8	9	10
Aline	Kevin	Ferhat	Mo	Mo	Mo	Mo	Mo	Mo	Mo	Mo
Ivana	Juliano	Elisha	Elisha	Axel	Dominic	Juliano	Kevin	Kevin	Dominic	Dominic
Kathi	René	Kevin	Kevin	Juliano	Kevin	Kevin	Elisha	Aleks	Aleks	Kevin
Laura	Ferhat	Juliano	Juliano	Kevin	Juliano	Edin	Juliano	Juliano	Juliano	Aleks
Luisa	Axel	René	René	René	Ferhat	Axel	Axel	Axel	Axel	Axel
Madleine	Laurin	Axel	Axel	Ferhat	Aleks	Aleks	Aleks	Edin	Kevin	Edin & Juliano
Melissa	Dominic	Laurin	Laurin	Laurin	Laurin	Laurin	Laurin	Laurin	Laurin	Laurin
Michelle	Mo	Mo	Ferhat	Elisha	Axel	René	René	René	René	René
Nadine	Elisha	Aleks	Aleks	Dominic	René	Elisha	Ferhat	Ferhat	Ferhat	Ferhat
Sabrina	Aleks	Dominic	Dominic	Aleks	Elisha	Dominic	Dominic	Dominic	Elisha	Elisha
Correct Matches	1	2	3	2 (BLACK OUT)	5	5	5	6	7	10

Notes

Name = Unconfirmed perfect match
N/A = This boy was not chosen in the matching night

Due to the blackout in the fourth matching night, the whole cast lost €20,000, lowering the total money at the end to €180,000, instead of €200,000. Because of Edin joining the show at a later stage, the total money was raised by €20,000 in the finale, so the cast had a winning sum of €200,000 again.

==== Truth Booths ====
Couple	Match Box	Result
Mo & Ivana	1	No Match
Dominic & Melissa	2	No Match
Mo & Aline	3	Perfect Match
Laurin & Melissa	4	Perfect Match
Elisha & Ivana	5	No Match
René & Michelle	6	Perfect Match
Edin & Ivana	7	No Match
Axel & Sabrina	8	No Match
Ferhat & Luisa	9	No Match
Kevin & Kathi^{1}	10	Perfect Match

===== Notes =====
1. Caroline had two matches, with Maximilian being the second one. Therefor Maximilian had to leave the show as well.

=== Season 2 – Greece ===
Filmed in Greece

==== Cast ====
Guys
Cast member	Age	Hometown
Aaron	22	Lohmar
Dario	33	Munich
Dominik	23	Vienna
Germain	22	Berlin
Marc	24	Erftstadt
Marcel	23	Berlin
Marko	22	Rafz
Marvin	26	Mönchengladbach
Maximilian	24	Rendsburg
Sascha	24	Troisdorf

Girls
Cast member	Age	Hometown
Christin	25	Harsewinkel
Jill	20	Essen
Kathleen	26	Nettetal
Laura	25	Stuttgart
Leonie	25	Wesel
Melissa	22	Ludwigsburg
Mirjam	26	Hamburg
Sabrina	23	Vienna
Vanessa E.	20	Innsbruck
Victoria	24	Lind
Vanessa M.^{1}	29	

===== Notes =====
1. Vanessa joined in Episode 10.

==== Progress ====
Guys	Matching Night									
Guys	1	2	3	4	5	6	7	8	9	10
Aaron	Kathleen	Kathleen	Melissa	Melissa	Mirjam	Melissa	Melissa	Vanessa E.	Melissa	Melissa
Dario	Victoria	Laura	Victoria	Kathleen	Victoria	Vanessa M.	Sabrina	Victoria	Kathleen	Sabrina
Dominik	Melissa	Melissa	Vanessa E.	Laura	Vanessa E.	Vanessa E.	Laura	Melissa	Sabrina	Vanessa E.
Germain	Leonie	Victoria	Christin	Victoria	Christin	Victoria	Vanessa M.	Jill	Laura	Christin
Marc	Mirjam	Mirjam	Leonie	Mirjam	Melissa	Mirjam	Mirjam	Vanessa M.	Mirjam	Mirjam
Marcel	Laura	Leonie	Laura	Leonie	Leonie	Leonie	Leonie	Leonie	Leonie	Leonie
Marko	Sabrina	Sabrina	Mirjam	Sabrina	Vanessa M.	Sabrina	Victoria	Laura	Victoria	Kathleen
Marvin	Jill	Vanessa E.	Kathleen	Christin	Kathleen	Laura	Kathleen	Kathleen	Vanessa E.	Jill
Maximilian	Christin	Christin	Jill	Jill	Laura	Christin	Christin	Mirjam	Christin	Victoria
Sascha	Vanessa E.	Jill	Sabrina	Vanessa E.	Jill	Jill	Jill	Sabrina	Jill	Laura
Correct Matches	2	2	3	3	3	4	4	1 (BLACK OUT)	3	10

Girls	Matching Night									
Girls	1	2	3	4	5	6	7	8	9	10
Christin	Maximilian	Maximilian	Germain	Marvin	Germain	Maximilian	Maximilian	N/A	Maximilian	Germain
Jill	Marvin	Sascha	Maximilian	Maximilian	Sascha	Sascha	Sascha	Germain	Sascha	Marvin
Kathleen	Aaron	Aaron	Marvin	Dario	Marvin	N/A	Marvin	Marvin	Dario	Marko
Laura	Marcel	Dario	Marcel	Dominik	Maximilian	Marvin	Dominik	Marko	Germain	Sascha
Leonie	Germain	Marcel	Marc	Marcel	Marcel	Marcel	Marcel	Marcel	Marcel	Marcel
Melissa	Dominik	Dominik	Aaron	Aaron	Marc	Aaron	Aaron	Dominik	Aaron	Aaron
Mirjam	Marc	Marc	Marko	Marc	Aaron	Marc	Marc	Maximilian	Marc	Marc
Sabrina	Marko	Marko	Sascha	Marko	N/A	Marko	Dario	Sascha	Dominik	Dario
Vanessa E.	Sascha	Marvin	Dominik	Sascha	Dominik	Dominik	N/A	Aaron	Marvin	Dominik
Victoria	Dario	Germain	Dario	Germain	Dario	Germain	Marko	Dario	Marko	Maximilian
Vanessa M.	Not in the Game				Marko	Dario	Germain	Marc	N/A	N/A
Correct Matches	2	2	3	3	3	4	4	1 (BLACK OUT)	3	10

Notes

Name = Unconfirmed perfect match
N/A = This girl was not chosen in the matching night

==== Truth Booths ====
Couple	Match Box	Result
Maximilian & Sabrina	1	No Match
Germain & Victoria	2	Truth Booth Trade
Aaron & Kathleen	3	No Match
Marcel & Laura	4	No Match
Marcel & Leonie	5	Perfect Match
Marc & Mirjam	6	Truth Booth Trade
Dario & Laura	7	No Match
Marko & Sabrina	8	No Match
Aaron & Melissa	9	Perfect Match
Marc & Mirjam	10	Perfect Match

=== Season 3 ===
==== Cast ====
Guys
Cast member	Age
Andre	23
Antonio	24
Dustin	25
Jordi	23
Leon	21
Marius	26
Max	23
Mike	22
Tim	21
William	32

Girls
Cast member	Age
Dana	25
Estelle	22
Isabelle	28
Jessica	20
Joelina	24
Kerstin	23
Marie	24
Monami	23
Raphaela	27
Zaira	N/A
Desirée	30

==== Progress ====
Guys	Matching Night									
Guys	1	2	3	4	5	6	7	8	9	10
Andre	Raphaela	Dana	Raphaela	Isabelle	Joelina	Marie	Desirée	Marie	Desirée	Isabelle
Antonino	Monami	Monami	Kerstin	Monami	Kerstin	Dana	Dana	Dana	Isabelle	Dana
Dustin	Zaira	Isabelle	Zaira	Zaira	Isabelle	Isabelle	Isabelle	Isabelle	Dana	Marie
Jordi	Estelle	Zaira	Jessica	Raphaela	Zaira	Desirée	Monami	Monami	Monami	Estelle
Leon	Jessica	Estelle	Estelle	Estelle	Jessica	Jessica	Jessica	Jessica	Jessica	Jessica
Marius	Isabelle	Marie	Isabelle	Jessica	Raphaela	Zaira	Zaira	Zaira	Zaira	Zaira
Max	Kerstin	Kerstin	Monami	Marie	Monami	Kerstin	Marie	Kerstin	Raphaela	Monami
Mike	Joelina	Joelina	Joelina	Joelina	Estelle	Estelle	Joelina	Estelle	Estelle	Joelina
Tim	Marie	Jessica	Marie	Kerstin	Desirée	Joelina	Kerstin	Joelina	Joelina	Kerstin
William	Dana	Raphaela	Dana	Dana	Dana	Raphaela	Raphaela	Raphaela	Marie	Raphaela/Desirée
Correct Matches	3	2	2	3	2	4	6	4	2	10

Girls	Matching Night									
Girls	1	2	3	4	5	6	7	8	9	10
Dana	William	Andre	William	William	William	Antonino	Antonino	Antonino	Dustin	Antonino
Estelle	Jordi	Leon	Leon	Leon	Mike	Mike	N/A	Mike	Mike	Jordi
Isabelle	Marius	Dustin	Marius	Andre	Dustin	Dustin	Dustin	Dustin	Antonino	Andre
Jessica	Leon	Tim	Jordi	Marius	Leon	Leon	Leon	Leon	Leon	Leon
Joelina	Mike	Mike	Mike	Mike	Andre	Tim	Mike	Tim	Tim	Mike
Kerstin	Max	Max	Antonino	Tim	Antonino	Max	Tim	Max	N/A	Tim
Marie	Tim	Marius	Tim	Max	N/A	Andre	Max	Andre	William	Dustin
Monami	Antonino	Antonino	Max	Antonino	Max	N/A	Jordi	Jordi	Jordi	Max
Raphaela	Andre	William	Andre	Jordi	Marius	William	William	William	Max	William
Zaira	Dustin	Jordi	Dustin	Dustin	Jordi	Marius	Marius	Marius	Marius	Marius
Desirée	Not in the Show				Tim	Jordi	Andre	N/A	Andre	William
Correct Matches	3	2	2	3	2	4	6	4	2	10

===== Notes =====
Name = Unconfirmed perfect match N/A = This girl was not chosen in the matching night

==== Truth Booths ====
Couple	Match Box	Result
Mike & Jessica	1	No Match
Leon & Monami	2	No Match
Andre & Raphaela	3	No Match
William & Dana	4	Truth Booth Trade
Antonino & Monami	5	No Match
Max & Jessica	6	No Match
Marius & Zaira	7	Perfect Match
Jordi & Raphaela	8	No Match
Max & Kerstin	9	No Match
Dustin & Isabelle	10	No Match

=== Season 4 ===
Filmed in Paros, Greece.

==== Cast ====
Guys
Cast member	Age	Hometown
Barkin	27	Duisburg
Burim	27	Mollis (Switzerland)
Cris	26	Hamburg
Deniz	24	Innsbruck (Austria)
Joel	25	Recklinghausen
Ken	25	Mainz
Kenneth	24	Hamburg
Marwin	25	Hameln
Maximilian	28	Arnsberg
Pascal	23	Düsseldorf
Sasa	23	Berlin

Girls
Cast member	Age	Hometown
Aurelia	25	Ulm
Carina	23	Belefeld
Caroline	21	Straubing
Dorna	22	Cologne
Henna	23	Munich
Juliete	21	Leipzig
Larissa	22	Stuttgart
Stefanie	24	Augsburg
Valeria	22	Lahr
Vanessa	26	Hamburg

==== Progress ====
Guys	Matching Night									
Guys	1	2	3	4	5	6	7	8	9	10
Barkin	Caroline	Juliette	Juliette	N/A	Juliette	Juliette	Dorna	Juliette	Larissa	no longer needed
Burim	Juliette	Aurelia	N/A	Dorna	Dorna	Aurelia	Henna	Valeria	Juliette	no longer needed
Cris	Stefanie	Stefanie	Stefanie	Stefanie	Stefanie	Stefanie	Stefanie	Stefanie	Stefanie	Stefanie
Deniz	Aurelia	N/A	Dorna	Larissa	Larissa	Dorna	Vanessa	Henna	Carina	no longer needed
Joel	Larissa	Larissa	Larissa	Valeria	Valeria	Vanessa	Aurelia	Dorna	Valeria	no longer needed
Ken	Carina	Carina	Henna	Henna	Caroline	Caroline	Caroline	Caroline	Caroline	Caroline
Kenneth	Henna	Henna	Aurelia	Juliette	Henna	Henna	Juliette	Carina	Henna	no longer needed
Marwin	Dorna	Dorna	Vanessa	Aurelia	Aurelia	Larissa	Carina	Aurelia	Vanessa	no longer needed
Maximilian	Valeria	Caroline	Valeria	Caroline	Caroline	Caroline	Caroline	Caroline	Caroline	Caroline
Pascal	N/A	Valeria	Caroline	Carina	Carina	Valeria	Valeria	Larissa	Aurelia	no longer needed
Sasa	Vanessa	Vanessa	Carina	Vanessa	Vanessa	Carina	Larissa	Vanessa	Dorna	no longer needed
Correct Matches	3	3	2	3	4	3	2 (BLACK OUT	2 (BLACK OUT)	10	

Girls	Matching Night									
Girls	1	2	3	4	5	6	7	8	9	10
Aurelia	Deniz	Burim	Kenneth	Marwin	Marwin	Burim	Joel	Marwin	Pascal	no longer needed
Carina	Ken	Ken	Sasa	Pascal	Pascal	Sasa	Marwin	Kenneth	Deniz	no longer needed
Caroline (Note: Caroline had two matches, with Maximilian being the second one. Therefore Maximilian had to leave the show as well.)	Barkin	Maximilian	Pascal	Maximilian	Ken/Maximilian	Ken/Maximilian	Ken/Maximilian	Ken/Maximilian	Ken/Maximilian	Ken/Maximilian
Dorna	Marwin	Marwin	Deniz	Burim	Burim	Deniz	Barkin	Joel	Sasa	no longer needed
Henna	Kenneth	Kenneth	Ken	Ken	Kenneth	Kenneth	Burim	Deniz	Kenneth	no longer needed
Juliette	Burim	Barkin	Barkin	Kenneth	Barkin	Barkin	Kenneth	Barkin	Burim	no longer needed
Larissa	Joel	Joel	Joel	Deniz	Deniz	Marwin	Sasa	Pascal	Barkin	no longer needed
Stefanie	Cris	Cris	Cris	Cris	Cris	Cris	Cris	Cris	Cris	Cris
Valeria	Maximilian	Pascal	Maximilian	Joel	Joel	Pascal	Pascal	Burim	Joel	no longer needed
Vanessa	Sasa	Sasa	Marwin	Sasa	Sasa	Joel	Deniz	Sasa	Marwin	no longer needed
Correct Matches	3	3	2	3	4	3	2 (BLACK OUT)	2 (BLACK OUT)	10	no longer needed

Name = Unconfirmed perfect match

==== Truth Booths ====
Couple	MatchBox	Result
Marwin & Valeria	Special	No Match
Kenneth & Dorna	1	No Match
Burim & Carina	2	No Match
Cris & Stefanie	3	Perfect Match
Maximilian & Valeria	4	No Match
Ken & Caroline	5	Perfect Match
Burim & Dorna	6	No Match
Joel & Juliette	7	No Match
Marwin & Dorna	8	No Match
Pascal & Carina	9	No Match
no longer needed	10	no longer needed

=== Season 5 – Thailand ===
Filmed in Thailand.

==== Cast ====
Guys
Cast member	Age	Hometown
Eti	22	Duisburg
Gerrit	24	Cologne
Kevin	20	Berlin
Martin	25	Augsburg
Paddy	23	Stuttgart
Paulo	21	Wuppertal
Ryan	21	Landshut
Sandro	28	Heidelberg
Sidar	25	Krefeld
Wilson	24	Hamburg

Girls
Cast member	Age	Hometown
Afra	26	Bochum
Edda	22	Berlin
Jana	26	Dortmund
Julia	23	Cologne
Lina	28	Berlin
Lisa-Marie	24	Iserlohn
Maja	24	Berlin
Melanie	23	Zürich
Pia	24	Magdeburg
Shelly	24	Rostock
Sina	26	Cologne
Tais	21	Hanover

==== Progress ====
Guys	Matching Night										
Guys	1	2	3	4	5	6	7	8	9	10	Perfect Matches
Eti	Lisa-Marie	Afra	Maja	Maja	Maja	Maja	Maja	Afra	Maja	Maja	Maja
Gerrit	Pia	Tais	Tais	Tais	Tais	Tais	Tais	Tais	Tais	Tais	Tais, Melanie and Pia
Kevin	Sina	Sina	Melanie	Sina	Julia	Lina	Lina	Lina	Lina	Lina	Lina
Martin	Julia	Lina	Lisa-Marie	Julia	Lisa-Marie	Lisa-Marie	Afra	Lisa-Marie	Lisa-Marie	Afra	Sina
Paddy	Maja	Shelly	Julia	Lina	Lina	Edda	Jana	Jana	Sina	Edda	Afra
Paulo	Tais	Lisa-Marie	Edda	Lisa-Marie	Edda	Sina	Sina	Sina	Edda	Lisa-Marie	Lisa-Marie
Ryan	Lina	Pia	Jana	Edda	Jana	Jana	Edda	Edda	Jana	Jana	Jana
Sandro	Edda	Edda	Sina	Pia	Sina	Afra	Julia	Julia	Julia	Julia	Julia
Sidar	Jana	Jana	Afra	Jana	Afra	Julia	Lisa-Marie	Maja	Afra	Sina	Edda
Wilson	Shelly	Maya	Shelly	Shelly	Shelly	Shelly	Shelly	Shelly	Shelly	Shelly	Shelly
Correct Matches	2	2	4	3	4	5	5	4	6	7	Perfect Matches

Girls	Matching Night									
Girls	1	2	3	4	5	6	7	8	9	10
Afra	N/A	Eti	Sidar	Eti	Sidar	Sandro	Martin	Eti	Sidar	Martin
Edda	Sandro	Sandro	Paulo	Ryan	Paolo	Paddy	Ryan	Ryan	Paulo	Paddy
Jana	Sidar	Sidar	Ryan	Sidar	Ryan	Ryan	Paddy	Paddy	Ryan	Ryan
Julia	Martin	N/A	Paddy	Martin	Kevin	Sidar	Sandro	Sandro	Sandro	Sandro
Lina	Ryan	Martin	N/A	Paddy	Paddy	Kevin	Kevin	Kevin	Kevin	Kevin
Lisa-Marie	Eti	Paulo	Martin	Paulo	Martin	Martin	Sidar	Martin	Martin	Paulo
Maja	Paddy	Wilson	Eti	N/A	Eti	Eti	Eti	Sidar	Eti	Eti
Melanie	Not in the Show		Kevin	N/A	Gerrit	Gerrit	Gerrit	Gerrit	Gerrit	Gerrit
Pia	Gerrit	Ryan	N/A	Sandro	Gerrit	Gerrit	Gerrit	Gerrit	Gerrit	Gerrit
Shelly	Wilson	Paddy	Wilson	Wilson	Wilson	Wilson	Wilson	Wilson	Wilson	Wilson
Sina	Kevin	Kevin	Sandro	Kevin	Sandro	Paulo	Paulo	Paulo	Paddy	Sidar
Tais	Paulo	Gerrit	Gerrit	Gerrit	Gerrit	Gerrit	Gerrit	Gerrit	Gerrit	Gerrit
Correct Matches	2	2	4	3	4	5	5	4	6	7

===== Notes =====
Name = Unconfirmed perfect match N/A = This girl was not chosen in the matching night

Melanie & Pia had to leave the show after the 6th Match Box as they also were Perfect Matches with Gerrit. They did not win any money.

==== Truth Booths ====
Couple	MatchBox	Result
Paulo & Jana	1	No Match
Ryan & Lina	2	No Match
Kevin & Maja	3	No Match
Eti & Melanie	4	No Match
Wilson & Shelly	5	Perfect Match
Gerrit & Tais	6	Perfect Match
Sandro & Sina	7	No Match
Paulo & Julia	8	No Match
Eti & Maja	9	Truth Booth Deal
Sandro & Afra	10	No Match
Kevin & Lina	11	Perfect Match

=== Season 6 ===
==== Cast ====
Guys
Cast member	Age	Hometown
Danish	27	Garbsen
Dino	29	Munich
Dion	25	Pfungstadt
Enes	23	Hamburg
Josh	28	Monaco
Joshua	24	Aachen
Kaan	29	Hürth
Levin	25	Karlsruhe
Sinan	30	Berlin
Tano	23	Siegen

Girls
Cast member	Age	Hometown
Anna	24	Cologne
Camelia	29	Dortmund
Chiara	24	Neuss
Deisy	26	Düsseldorf
Ina	30	Bielefeld
Joanna	26	Stuttgart
Nadja	25	Stuttgart
Nasti	27	Kiel
Selina	23	Nurnberg
Sophia	23	Siegen
Tori	24	Bierutów, Poland

==== Progress ====
Guys	Matching Night									
Guys	1	2	3	4	5	6	7	8	9	10
Danish	Sophia	Camelia	Sophia	Nadja	Nadja	Nadja	Nadja	Nadja	Nadja	Nadja
Dino	Deisy	Deisy	Deisy	Deisy	Deisy	Deisy	Deisy	Deisy	Deisy	Deisy
Dion	Tori	Selina	Chiara	Nasti	Chiara	Anna	Tori	Chiara	Sophia	Tori
Enes	Anna	Nasti	Selina	Selina	Selina	Selina	Sophia	Sophia	Ina	Selina
Josh	Nadja	Nadja	Nadja	Ina	Ina	Nasti	Camelia	Camelia	Camelia	Camelia
Joshua	Selina	Joanna	Joanna	Joanna	Joanna	Ina	Joanna	Anna	Tori	Ina
Kaan	Joanna	Anna	Anna	Anna	Sophia	Sophia	Selina	Selina	Anna	Anna
Levin	Camelia	Chiara	Camelia	Camelia	Camelia	Chiara	Chiara	Ina	Chiara	Chiara
Sinan	Ina	Ina	Nasti	Sophia	Nasti	Camelia	Nasti	Nasti	Nasti	Nasti
Tano	Chiara	Tori	Tori	Tori	Tori	Tori	Anna	Joanna	Joanna	Joanna/Sophia
Correct Matches	2	3	4	4	4	5	6	5	7	10

Girls	Matching Night									
Girls	1	2	3	4	5	6	7	8	9	10
Anna	Enes	Kaan	Kaan	Kaan	N/A	Dion	Tano	Joshua	Kaan	Kaan
Camelia	Levin	Danish	Levin	Levin	Levin	Sinan	Josh	Josh	Josh	Josh
Chiara	Tano	Levin	Dion	N/A	Dion	Levin	Levin	Dion	Levin	Levin
Deisy	Dino	Dino	Dino	Dino	Dino	Dino	Dino	Dino	Dino	Dino
Ina	Sinan	Sinan	N/A	Josh	Josh	Joshua	N/A	Levin	Enes	Joshua
Joanna	Kaan	Joshua	Joshua	Joshua	Joshua	N/A	Joshua	Tano	Tano	Tano
Nadja	Josh	Josh	Josh	Danish	Danish	Danish	Danish	Danish	Danish	Danish
Nasti	N/A	Enes	Sinan	ion	Sinan	Josh	Sinan	Sinan	Sinan	Sinan
Selina	Joshua	Dion	Enes	Enes	Enes	Enes	Kaan	Kaan	N/A	Enes
Sophia	Danish	N/A	Danish	Sinan	Kaan	Kaan	Enes	Enes	Dion	N/A
Tori	Dion	Tano	Tano	Tano	Tano	Tano	Dion	N/A	Joshua	Dion
Correct Matches	2	3	4	4	4	5	6	5	7	10

Notes

Name = Unconfirmed perfect match
N/A = This person was not chosen in the matching night

==== Truth Booths ====
Couple	Match Box	Result
Josh & Anna	1	No Match
Levin & Camelia	2	Truth Booth Deal
Sinan & Ina	3	No Match
Danish & Nadja	4	Perfect Match
Dino & Deisy	5	Perfect Match
Tano & Tori	6	Truth Booth Deal
Kaan & Sophia	7	No Match
Joshua & Joanna	8	No Match
Sinan & Nasti	9	Perfect Match
Josh & Camelia	10	Perfect Match

== Spin Off - Reality Stars in Love ==
=== Series overview ===
Season	Originally aired (RTL+)		Number of cast members	All Perfect Matches Found?	Total Money Won
Season	Season premiere	Season finale	Number of cast members	All Perfect Matches Found?	Total Money Won
1	July 8, 2021	September 9, 2021	21	✗	€400.000
2	August 2, 2022	Oktober 11, 2022	21	✓	€200.000
3	August 17, 2023	Oktober 24, 2023	21	✓	€180.000
4	Juli 26, 2024	October 4, 2024	21	✓	€110.000

==== Season 1 – Greece ====
Filmed in Greece.

===== Cast =====
Guys
Cast member	Age	Hometown	Known from
Alex	24	Essen	The Bachelorette
Danilo	26	Switzerland	The Bachelorette Switzerland, Ex on the Beach
Diogo	26	Cologne	Temptation Island, Ex on the Beach
Eugen	28	Essen	Temptation Island 2019 & 2020
Francesco	27		Love Island
Jamy	32	Hamburg	The Bachelorette Switzerland
Josua	25	Waghäusel	Love Island
Manu	26	Kassel	The Bachelorette
Salvatore	27		Ex on the Bach, Paradise Hotel, Temptation Island
Tommy	26	Nice	Ex on the Beach

Girls
Cast member	Age	Hometown	Known from
Aurelia	24	Frankfurt	Love Island
Finnja	22	Cologne	Take Me Out, Love Island, Temptation Island, Ex on the Beach
Jacky	31		Temptation Island, Ex on the Beach
Jill	20	Essen	Are You The One? Season 2
Jules	25	Cölbe	Love Island
Kathleen	26	Nettetal	Are You The One? Season 2
Melina	24	Cologne	Love Island
Sarah	27	Kassel	Temptation Island, Temptation Island VIP
Steffi	31		Take me Out, Just Tattoo Of Us
Walentina	20	Essen	Ex on the Beach
Vanessa	28	Austria	Ex on the Beach

Notes

Vanessa will move in at a later point during the show.

===== Progress =====
Guys	Matching Night										
Guys	1	2	3	4	5	6	7	8	9	10	Perfect Match
Alex	Jules	canceled	Finnja	Steffi	Sarah	Steffi	Jacky	Melina	Sarah	Vanessa	Vanessa/Sarah
Danilo	Steffi	canceled	Sarah	Melina	Aurelia	Jill	Aurelia	Aurelia	Jill	Sarah	Melina
Diogo	Aurelia	canceled	Aurelia	Aurelia	Vanessa	Aurelia	Vanessa	Vanessa	Aurelia	Jill	Finnja
Eugen	Walentina	canceled	Steffi	Finnja	Finnja	Finnja	Jill	Jacky	Melina	Walentina	Walentina
Francesco^{1}	Finnja	Jules	Jules	Jules	Jules	Jules	Jules	Jules	Jules	Jules	Jules
Jamy	Jill	canceled	Jill	Vanessa	Steffi	Sarah	Finnja	Sarah	Steffi	Steffi	Steffi
Josua	Sarah	canceled	Walentina	Sarah	Walentina	Walentina	Sarah	Walentina	Vanessa	Aurelia	Aurelia
Manu	Kathleen	canceled	Kathleen	Kathleen	Jill	Kathleen	Kathleen	Finnja	Kathleen	Kathleen	Kathleen
Salvatore	Jacky	canceled	Jacky	Walentina	Kathleen	Jacky	Walentina	Jill	Walentina	Jacky	Jacky
Tommy	Melina	canceled	Melina	Jill	Melina	Melina	Melina	Steffi	Finnja	Finnja	Jill
Correct Matches	3	-	3	4	3	3	2	1 (BLACK OUT)	4	7	Perfect Matches

Girls	Matching Night										
Girls	1	2	3	4	5	6	7	8	9	10	Perfect Match
Aurelia	Diogo	canceled	Diogo	Diogo	Danilo	Diogo	Danilo	Danilo	Diogo	Josua	Josua
Finnja	Franceso	canceled	Alex	Eugen	Eugen	Eugen	Jamy	Manu	Tommy	Tommy	Diogo
Jacky	Salvatore	canceled	Salvatore	N/A	N/A	Salvatore	Alex	Eugen	N/A	Salvatore	Salvatore
Jill	Jamy	canceled	Jamy	Tommy	Manu	Danilo	Eugen	Salvatore	Danilo	Diogo	Tommy
Jules^{1}	Alex	Francesco	Francesco	Francesco	Francesco	Francesco	Francesco	Francesco	Francesco	Francesco	Francesco
Kathleen	Manu	canceled	Manu	Manu	Salvatore	Manu	Manu	N/A	Manu	Manu	Manu
Melina	Tommy	canceled	Tommy	Danilo	Tommy	Tommy	Tommy	Alex	Eugen	N/A	Danilo
Sarah	Josua	canceled	Danilo	Josua	Alex	Jamy	Josua	Jamy	Alex	Danilo	Alex
Steffi	Danilo	canceled	Eugen	Alex	Jamy	Alex	N/A	Tommy	Jamy	Jamy	Jamy
Walentina	Eugen	canceled	Josua	Salvatore	Josua	Josua	Salvatore	Josua	Salvatore	Eugen	Eugen
Vanessa	not in the show			Jamy	Diogo	N/A	Diogo	Diogo	Josua	Alex	Alex
Correct Matches	3	-	3	4	3	3	2	1 (BLACK OUT)	4	7	Perfect Matches

====== Notes ======
Name = Unconfirmed perfect match
N/A = This girl was not chosen in the matching night

After Francesco and Jules left the show, the money went down from €200.000 to €180.000 . For the truth booth in week 4, the contestant traded the truth booth for €70.000, so the winning sum was raised to €250.000 . In week 5, the truth booth trade was worth €150.000 and the trade was made, so the winning sum was €400.000 . In week 8, due to a blackout, the winning sum was lowered to €350.000 . In week 9, an offer was made to buy back a trooth booth match: Tommy & Melina. They took this deal and lost €200.000, lowering the winning sum to €150.000 .

===== Truth Booths =====
Couple	Match Box	Result
Danilo & Finnja	1	No Match
No Truth Booth^{1}	2	cancelled
Tommy & Walentina	3	No Match
Diogo & Aurelia	4	Truth Booth Trade
Tommy & Melina	5	Truth Booth Trade
Salvatore & Finnja	6	No Match
Eugen & Finnja	7	No Match
Eugen & Steffi	8	No Match
Josua & Sarah Tommy & Melina	9 special deal	No Match No Match
Josua & Aurelia	10	Perfect Match

===== Notes =====
1. Francesco had to leave the show due to a family emergency before the second truth booth and matching night could take place. Because of this, Jules was revealed as his perfect match and had to leave the show as well, and there was no matching night or truth booth in the second week.

==== Season 2 – Paros, Greece ====
Filmed in Paros.

===== Cast =====
Guys
Cast member	Age	Hometown	Known from
Amadu	26	Cologne	Love Island
Calvin	29	Aachen	Temptation Island, Temptation Island VIP, Couple Challenge
Fabio	27	Berlin	Temptation Island, Couple Challenge
Felix	26	Essen	Temptation Island
Luca	25	Geestland	Love Island
Lukas	30	Bodelshausen	Temptation Island VIP, Take me Out XXL
Martin	30	Gütersloh	Love Island
Maurice	23	Oberhausen	Love Island
Max	24	Stuttgart	Ex on the Bach, Temptation Island
Michael	24	Leudersdorf	Couple Challenge
Pharrell	31	Xanten	Temptation Island

Girls
Cast member	Age	Hometown	Known from
Anna	26	Dortmund	Love Island
Cecilia	26	Düsseldorf	Take Me Out
Celina	23	Nürnberg	Ex on the Beach
Franziska	27	Kassel	The Bachelor
Gina	24	Duisburg	Temptation Island
Isabelle	29	Munich	Are You The One?
Karina	27	Reichshof	Beauty & The Nerd
Luisa	20	Pettstadt	Beauty & The Nerd
Ricarda	29	Erkrath	Love Island
Zoe	22		Germany's Next Topmodel

===== Progress =====
Guys	Matching Night									
Guys	1	2	3	4	5	6	7	8	9	10
Amadu	Cecilia	Gina	Cecilia	canceled	Cecilia	N/A	Cecilia	Cecilia	Cecilia	Cecilia
Calvin	Gina	Luisa	Karina	canceled	N/A	Karina	Karina	Franziska	Gina	Franziska
Fabio	Luisa	Karina	Celina	canceled	Celina	Celina	Celina	Gina	Celina	Celina
Luca	Zoe	Franziska	Isabelle	canceled	Zoe	Zoe	Zoe	Celina	N/A	Karina
Lukas	Isabelle	Zoe	Franziska	canceled	Luisa	Luisa	Luisa	Luisa	Luisa	Luisa
Maurice	Ricarda	Ricarda	Ricarda	canceled	Isabelle	Cecilia	N/A	Zoe	Ricarda	Ricarda
Martin	Celina	Isabelle	Anna	canceled	Karina	Isabelle	Isabelle	Karina	Karina	Gina
Max	Franziska	Celina	Zoe	canceled	Ricarda	Franziska	Franziska	N/A	Franziska	Isabelle
Michael	Anna	Anna	Gina	canceled	Franziska	Anna	Anna	Anna	Anna	Anna
Pharell	Karina	Cecilia	Luisa	canceled	Anna	Ricarda	Ricarda	Ricarda	Zoe	Zoe
Felix	Not in the Show				Gina	Gina	Gina	Isabelle	Isabelle	Isabelle
Correct Matches	3	2	3	-	3	3	4	5	7	10

Girls	Matching Night									
Girls	1	2	3	4	5	6	7	8	9	10
Anna	Michael	Michael	Martin	canceled	Pharell	Michael	Michael	Michael	Michael	Michael
Cecilia	Amadu	Pharell	Amadu	canceled	Amadu	Maurice	Amadu	Amadu	Amadu	Amadu
Celina	Martin	Max	Fabio	canceled	Fabio	Fabio	Fabio	Luca	Fabio	Fabio
Franziska	Max	Luca	Lukas	canceled	Michael	Max	Max	Calvin	Max	Calvin
Gina	Calvin	Amadu	Michael	canceled	Felix	Felix	Felix	Fabio	Calvin	Martin
Isabelle	Lukas	Martin	Luca	canceled	Maurice	Martin	Martin	Felix	Felix	Felix & Max
Karina	Pharell	Fabio	Calvin	canceled	Martin	Calvin	Calvin	Martin	Martin	Luca
Luisa	Fabio	Calvin	Pharell	canceled	Lukas	Lukas	Lukas	Lukas	Lukas	Lukas
Ricarda	Maurice	Maurice	Maurice	canceled	Max	Pharrell	Pharrell	Pharrell	Maurice	Maurice
Zoe	Luca	Lukas	Max	canceled	Luca	Luca	Luca	Maurice	Pharrell	Pharrell
Correct Matches	3	2	3	-	3	3	4	5	7	10

====== Notes ======
Name = Unconfirmed perfect match
N/A = This girl was not chosen in the matching night

===== Truth Booths =====
Couple	Match Box	Result
Martin & Zoe	1	No Match
Karina & Pharrell	2	No Match
Celina & Lukas	3	No Match
Isabell & Amadu	4	Truth Booth Deal
Felix & Ricarda	5	No Match
Pharrell & Isabelle	6	No Match
Amadu & Cecilia	7	Perfect Match
Michael & Anna	8	Perfect Match
Ricarda & Pharrell	9	No Match
Franziska & Max	10	No Match

===== Notes =====
1. Lukas had to leave the show due to a family emergency before the second truth booth and matching night could take place. Because of this, Luisa was revealed as his perfect match and had to leave the show as well, thus there was no matching night in that week.

==== Season 3 – Thailand ====
Filmed in Thailand.

===== Cast =====
Guys
Cast member	Age	Hometown	Known from
Danilo Cristilli	26	Villingen-Schwenningen	Love Island 2019, Germany Shore 2022
Elia Berthoud	30	Schafferhausen	Germany Shore 2023
Emanuell Weissenberger	30	Munich	Die Bachelorette 2022
Fabio	30	Munich	Make Love. Fake Love
Martini "Teezy"	28	Düsseldorf	Ex on the Beach Germany 2022
Marvin	28	Aachen	#Couple Challenge 2022, Swipe-Match-Love 2022
Mike Heiter	31	Essen	Love Island 2017, Sommerhaus of Stars 2020, Kampf der Realitystars 2022
Paco	27	Hanover	Love Island 2021
Peter Kujan	25	Zürich (Schwitzerland)	Bachelorette 2022, Germany Shore 2023
Steffen Vogeno	28	Oldenburg	Bachelorette 2022
Max	26		Make love. Fake love. 2023

Girls
Cast member	Age	Hometown	Known from
Alicia	29	Neurieden	Temptation Island 2021
Christina "Shakira" Aurora	25	Queidersbach	Bachelor 2022, Bachelor in Paradise 2022
Darya Strelnikova	30	Munich	Germanys Next Topmodel 2015
Jenny	25	Cologne	Love Island 2021, Eating my Ex 2022
Kim Virginia Hartung	27	Miami, USA	Bachelor 2021, Temptation Island 2021, Bachelor in Paradise 2022
Marie	26	Wels	Are You The One? 2021
Paulina	20	Cologne	Ex on the Beach 2022
Sabrina	26	Vienna	Are you the One? 2020, Take me Out 2020, Bachelor Switzerland 2022
Sandra	30	Cologne	Ex on the Beach 2021, #Couple Challenge 2022, Temptation Island 2022
Stefanie	26	Augsburg	Are you the One? 2022

Notes

Max will move in at a later point during the show.

===== Progress =====
Guys	Matching Night										
Guys	1	2	3	4	5	6	7	8	9	10	Perfect Match
Danilo	Darya	Paulina	Darya	Darya	Darya	Darya	Darya	Darya	Darya	Darya	Darya
Paco	Sandra	Kim	Sandra	Sabrina	Shakira	Alicia	Jennifer	Alicia	Paulina	Jennifer	Jennifer
Steffen	Paulina	Alicia	Alicia	Sandra	Alicia	Sandra	Marie	Shakira	Alicia	Sandra	Sandra
Marvin	Shakira	Jennifer	Stefanie	Jennifer	Jennifer	Jennifer	Paulina	Jennifer	Shakira	Shakira	Shakira
Mike	Kim	Sabrina	Paulina	N/A	Paulina	Paulina	Sandra	Stefanie	Sabrina	Sabrina	Sabrina
Emanuell	Sabrina	Darya	Jennifer	Stefanie	Sabrina	Stefanie	Sabrina	Sabrina	Stefanie	Stefanie	Stefanie
Elia	Jennifer	Sandra	Marie	Marie	Stefanie	Marie	Stefanie	Marie	Sandra	Alicia	Alicia
Fabio	Marie	Marie	Shakira	Shakira	Marie	Shakira	Alicia	Sandra	Marie	Marie	Marie
Martini	Stefanie	Stefanie	Kim	Alicia	Kim	Kim	Kim	Paulina	Kim	Kim	Kim
Peter	Alicia	Shakira	Sabrina	Kim	N/A	Sabrina	N/A (Note: Max sold the sixth Truth Booth decision for 50,000€. As a result of this, the man with whom Max shared a Perfect Match had to leave the show. This was revealed to be Peter, therefore he couldn't participate in the remaining Matching Nights.)	N/A	N/A	N/A	Paulina
Max	Not in the Show			Paulina	Sandra	N/A	Shakira	Kim	Jenny	Paulina	Paulina
Correct Matches	3	2	2	4	3	4	3	1 (BLACKOUT)	6	10	Perfect Matches

Girls	Matching Night									
Girls	1	2	3	4	5	6	7	8	9	10
Darya	Danilo	Emanuell	Danilo	Danilo	Danilo	Danilo	Danilo	Danilo	Danilo	Danilo
Sandra	Paco	Elia	Paco	Steffen	Max	Steffen	Mike	Fabio	Elia	Steffen
Paulina	Steffen	Danilo	Mike	Max	Mike	Mike	Marvin	Martini	Paco	Max/Peter
Shakira	Marvin	Peter	Fabio	Fabio	Paco	Fabio	Max	Steffen	Marvin	Marvin
Kim	Mike	Paco	Martini	Peter	Martini	Martini	Martini	Max	Martini	Martini
Sabrina	Emanuell	Mike	Peter	Paco	Emanuell	Peter	Emanuell	Emanuell	Mike	Mike
Jennifer	Elia	Marvin	Emanuell	Marvin	Marvin	Marvin	Paco	Marvin	Max	Paco
Marie	Fabio	Fabio	Elia	Elia	Fabio	Elia	Steffen	Elia	Fabio	Fabio
Stefanie	Martini	Martini	Marvin	Emanuell	Elia	Emanuell	Elia	Mike	Emanuell	Emanuell
Alicia	Peter	Steffen	Steffen	Martini	Steffen	Paco	Fabio	Paco	Steffen	Elia
Correct Matches	3	2	2	4	3	4	3	1 (BLACKOUT)	6	10

====== Notes ======
Name = Unconfirmed perfect match
N/A = This guy was not chosen in the matching night or was not in the Show during that Matching night

===== Truth Booths =====
Couple	Match Box	Result
Danilo & Jennifer	1	No Match
Elia & Jennifer	2	No Match
Elia & Darya	3	No Match
Mike & Kim	4	No Match
Danilo & Darya	5	Perfect Match
Martini & Alicia	6	No Match
Mike & Jennifer / Peter & Kim	7	Truth Booth Trade
Max & Sabrina	8	No Match
Emanuell & Stefanie	9	Perfect Match
Elia & Alicia	10	Perfect Match

==== Season 4 ====
===== Cast =====
Guys
Cast member	Age	Hometown	Known from
Alexander Runow	28	Mannheim	First dates, Die Bachelorette
Antonino De Niro	27	Frankfurt	Temptation Island, Are you the One?
Chris Broy	35	Cologne	Das Sommerhaus der Stars, Kampf der Realitystars
Kaan Aktas	27	Duisburg	Die Bachelorette, Bachelor in Paradise
Lars Maucher	27	Stuttgart	Ex on the Beach, Die Bachelorette
Lukas Charles Baltruschat	29	Hamburg	Die Bachelorette, Prominent getrennt
Marc-Robin Wenz	29	Karlsruhe	Temptation Island
Nikola Glumac	28	Munich	Temptation Island, Prominent getrennt
"Ozan" Gencel	27	Hamburg	Bachelorette, Bachelor in Paradise
Tim Kühnel	27	Stuttgart	Love Island, Prominent getrennt

Girls
Cast member	Age	Hometown	Known from				
Anastasia Hale	24	Berlin	Ex on the Beach				
Asena Neuhoff	27	Cologne	Love Island				
Dana Feist	28	Oldenburg	Are you the One?, Sommerhaus der Stars, Love Island				
Emmy Russ	24	Madrid, Spain	Kampf der Realitystars, Temptation Island VIP	"Gabi" Alves Rodrigues	23	Heilbronn	Ex on the Beach
"Jenny" Iglesias	25	Cologne	Love Island, Promi Big Brother				
Laura Lettgen	28	Munich	Love Island, Are you the One?				
Laura Morante	33	Essen	Kampf der Realitystars, Deutschland sucht den Superstar				
Linda Braunberger	23	n.a.	Germanys next Topmodel				
Nadja Großmann	24	Munich	Love Fool				
Tara Tabitha	31	London, England	Ex on the Beach				

Notes

Dana will move in later in the show.

===== Progress =====
Guys	Matching Night										
Guys	1	2	3	4	5	6	7	8	9	10	Perfect Match
Tim	Linda	Linda	Dana	Laura L.	Linda	Linda	Linda	Linda/Dana	Linda/Dana	Linda/Dana	Linda/Dana
Lukas	Jenny	Laura M.	Linda	Gabi	Jenny	Jenny	Dana	Tara	no longer needed	no longer needed	Tara
Alex	Laura L.	Jenny	Anastasia	Jenny	Gabi	Gabi	Gabi	Gabi	no longer needed	no longer needed	Gabi
Antonino	Laura M.	Dana	Nadja	Nadja	Asena	Asena	Asena	Asena	no longer needed	no longer needed	Asena
Chris	Emmy	Emmy	Emmy	Emmy	Emmy	Emmy	Emmy	Emmy	Emmy	Emmy	Emmy
Kaan	Asena	Nadja	Jenny	Asena	Tara	Tara	Tara	Jenny	no longer needed	no longer needed	Jenny
Lars	Nadja	Anastasia	Gabi	Tara	Nadja	Dana	Laura L.	Laura L.	no longer needed	no longer needed	Laura L.
Marc-Robin	Anastasia	Asena	Asena	Linda	Anastasia	Laura M.	Laura M.	Laura M.	no longer needed	no longer needed	Laura M.
Nikola	Tara	Tara	Laura L.	Anastasia	Laura L.	Nadja	Nadja	Nadja	no longer needed	no longer needed	Nadja
Ozan	Gabi	Laura L.	Laura M.	Laura M.	Dana	Anastasia	Anastasia	Anastasia	Anastasia	Anastasia	Anastasia
Correct Matches	2	3	3	1 (BLACKOUT)	5	6	6	10	10	10	Perfect Matches

Guys	Matching Night										
Guys	1	2	3	4	5	6	7	8	9	10	Perfect Match
Linda	Tim	Tim	Lukas	Marc-Robin	Tim	Tim	Tim	Tim	Tim	Tim	Tim
Tara	Nikola	Nikola	N/A	Lars	Kaan	Kaan	Kaan	Lukas	no longer needed	no longer needed	Lucas
Gabi	Ozan	N/A	Lars	Lukas	Alex	Alex	Alex	Alex	no longer needed	no longer needed	Alex
Asena	Kaan	Marc-Robin	Marc-Robin	Asena	Antonino	Antonino	Antonino	Antonino	no longer needed	no longer needed	Antonino
Emmy	Chris	Chris	Chris	Chris	Chris	Chris	Chris	Chris	Chris	Chris	Chris
Jenny	Lukas	Alex	Kaan	Alex	Lukas	Lukas	N/A	Kaan	no longer needed	no longer needed	Kaan
Laura L.	Alex	Ozan	Nikola	Tim	Nikola	N/A	Lars	Lars	no longer needed	no longer needed	Lars
Laura M.	Antonino	Lukas	Ozan	Ozan	N/A	Marc-Robin	Marc-Robin	Marc-Robin	no longer needed	no longer needed	Marc-Robin
Nadja	Lars	Kaan	Antonino	Antonino	Lars	Nikola	Nikola	Nikola	no longer needed	no longer needed	Nikola
Anastasia	Marc-Robin	Lars	Alex	Nikola	Marc-Robin	Ozan	Ozan	Ozan	Ozan	Ozan	Ozan
Correct Matches	2	3	3	1 (BLACKOUT)	5	6	6	10	10	10	Perfect Matches

====== Notes ======
Name = Unconfirmed perfect match
N/A = This girl was not chosen in the matching night

===== Truth Booths =====
Couple	Match Box	Result
Marc-Robin & Laura L.	1	No Match
Chris & Emmy	2	Perfect Match
Alex & Anastasia	3	Truth Booth Deal
Marc-Robin & Asena	4	No Match
Nikola & Laura M.	5	Truth Booth Deal
Ozan & Anastasia	6	Perfect Match
Lukas & Jenny	7	No Match
Tim & Linda	8	Perfect Match
Lars & Laura L.	9	No Match
no longer needed	10	no longer needed
