= Germany Shore =

German reality television series

- Genre: Reality
- Created by: MTV
- Starring: Cast
- Country of origin: Germany
- Original language: German
- No. of seasons: 5
- No. of episodes: 55 (5 Reunion episodes) (2 special episodes)

Production
- Executive producer: Constantin Entertainment
- Producer: MTV Entertainment Studios
- Running time: 40-50 minutes

Original release
- Network: MTV Germany; OnePlus (Series 1–2); 3+ (Series 1–2); Joyn (Series 1); Paramount+ (Series 2–)
- Release: November 17, 2021 – present

Related
- All Star Shore; Geordie Shore

Germany Shore (Series 1 titled Reality Shore) is a German reality television series on the premium sector OnePlus and Joyn and on the television channel 3+ and MTV Germany. It was first broadcast on November 17, 2021, and is the German offshoot of the American show Jersey Shore.

== Format ==
The show follows a group of civilians, reality TV stars and influencers who live in a mansion for several weeks. Its format is more similar to Super Shore than the original MTV show.

== Production ==
The house was located in Crete in Greece. The second season premiered on December 14, 2022 in Switzerland on OnePlus, and on December 15 of that year in Germany on Paramount+.

Starting with the third season, episodes are initially available exclusively on Paramount+ and are subsequently released on other platforms.

On November 5, 2024, Germany Shore OG premiered. a miniseries that documents part of the cast of the main show. In this new format, the participants face real-life problems.

== Series ==
Year	Series	Predominant location	Episodes
2021	Series 1	Crete, Greece	11
2022	Series 2	Croatia	11
2023	Series 3	Cap Sounion, Greece	11
2024	Series 4	Cap Sounion, Greece	11
2025	Series 5	Corfu, Greece	11
2026	Series 6	Corfu, Greece	–

=== Series 1 (2021) ===
The first season featured eight original participants, mostly reality TV stars and social media personalities: Bellydah Venost, Emanuel R. Brunner, Jessy Bosen, Nic, Niko, Walentina Doronina, and Yasin Mohamed; as the show progressed, additional participants joined. Niko was removed by the production team due to a rule violation. Walentina was eliminated following a decision made by her fellow contestants. Anthony left the villa voluntarily. Reality TV star Calvin Kleinen, Elena Miras from Love Island Germany and Melody Haase joined the cast as special guests.

=== Series 2 (2022) ===
The second season premiered on December 14, 2022. This season was rebranded as Germany Shore and was filmed in Croatia. It features the return of Walentina Doronina, following her expulsion in the previous season, as well as Emanuel R. Brunner and Mia Madisson; the latter appears as a guest. Yasin Mohamed left the show midway through the season.

=== Series 3 (2023–2024) ===
On February 10, 2023, the start of production of a third season was announced, which was filmed in June of the same year in Greece. The third season premiered on November 14, 2023, with two episodes per week. The list of cast members was revealed weeks before the premiere. In the first episode, nine new participants were introduced. The season features the return of Jessica Fiorini, who took part in the first season. Ramona and Selina were removed from the house following a vote organized by the production team, a move intended to make room for new participants. Bobby Chambertz was removed before the season ended due to acts of physical violence. Nathan Henry, Geordie Shore star , appeared as a special guest.

=== Series 4 (2024–2025) ===
The fourth season premiered on November 19, 2024. Eleven new participants joined the program. For the first time, a couple (Paulina and Tommy) appeared. In the fifth episode, Luisa Früh was eliminated by a vote from her fellow participants, while, shortly thereafter, Tina Rubia decided to leave the villa. Julius Tkatschenko was expelled from the program for pushing a participant who could not swim into the water. Jessy Bosen returned to the program before the end of the season. Michael joined the group as a guest both at the beginning and at the end of the season.

=== Series 5 (2025–2026) ===
On October 2, 2025, it was announced that the fifth season would premiere on October 28, 2025. Notable participants who did not return include Jessy Bosen, Hatidza Suarez, and Michael Schüler. The season initially featured eleven new cast members, with five more joining later.

Bellydah Venosta was removed by the production team to prevent physical violence between the participants from escalating; Honey decided to leave alongside her. Jakub Luszczak was also expelled for similar reasons, while Enes’s continued presence on the show was put to a vote among his fellow participants, which resulted in his expulsion. Honey and Elias Garcia left the show for personal reasons. Meanwhile, Jonathan Steining and Max Eggerstedt, both of whom had participated previously, rejoined the show. Walentina Doronina’s continued presence in the house was put to a vote, for the second time since the first season, which resulted in her departure; Lily Lee decided to leave along with her.

=== Series 6 (2026–2027) ===
The sixth season premiered on November 24, 2026. The series' renewal was announced in January 2026. This is the second season to feature a significant number of new cast members. The season marks the return (for the second time) of original cast members Jessy Bosen and Bellydah Venosta, as well as the return of Bella Heins, Daymian Weiß, and Gianluigi Birofio, who joined the cast as the season progressed. Italia Shore star Gilda Provenzano appears as a special guest. On November 19, 2026, a launch party was held at the Bootshaus club in Cologne, Germany.

== Cast ==
=== Current cast ===
Cast member	Notability	Series	Episodes*
Bellydah Venosta	Der Bachelor (Schweiz)	1–2, 3–5, 6–	41
Walentina Doronina	Ex on the Beach Germany	1, 2–	46
Jessy Bosen	—N/a	1–3, 4, 6–	35
Paulina Ljubas	Ex on the Beach Germany	3–	31
Tommy Pedroni	Temptation Island VIP Germany	3–	31
Bella Heins	Love Fool Germany	4, 6–	11
Daymian Weiß	Goodbye Deutschland	4, 6–	11
Gianluigi "Gigi" Birofio	Ex on the Beach Germany	5, 6–	4
Alina	—N/a	6–	0
Calvin Lesra Ogara	Too Hot To Handle Germany	6–	0
Dagi	—N/a	6–	0
Dominik Brcic	Are You the One?	6–	0
Jason F. Blond	—N/a	6–	0
Jason Weber	—N/a	6–	0
Julia Sanchez	—N/a	6–	0
Laurenz Pesch	Too Hot To Handle Germany	6–	0
Linda Braunberger	Germany’s Next Topmodel	6–	0
Lori Sanchez	—N/a	6–	0
Mara Bella	—N/a	6–	0
Ryan Connor	Reality Star Academy	6–	0
Selin Kitmir	Temptation Island VIP	6–	0
Xenia Helenia	—N/a	6–	0

=== Former cast ===
Cast member	Notability	Series	Episodes*
Jessica Fiorini	Love Island Germany	1, 3	19
Yasin Mohamed	Temptation Island Germany	1–2	18
Emanuel R. Brunner	Der Bachelor (Schweiz)	1, 2	16
Mia Madisson	—N/a	1, 2	13
Nic	—N/a	1	11
Gina Alisia De Rossa	—N/a	1	7
Nara	—N/a	1	5
Silvio	—N/a	1	5
Danilo Cristilli	Love Island Germany	1	3
Anthony	—N/a	1	2
Niko	—N/a	1	2
Jonathan "Jona" Steining	—N/a	2–4, 5	32
Julius Tkatschenko	—N/a	2–4	26
Hatidza "Haiti" Suarez	—N/a	2, 3	19
Antonia	—N/a	2	11
Dino Strukar	—N/a	2	11
Elia Berthoud	—N/a	2	11
Venance Gwladys Amvame	—N/a	2	11
Dana Feist	Love Island Germany	2, 4	9
Emilija Mihailova	—N/a	2	6
Peter Kujan	Die Bachelorette	2	4
Fabio de Pasquale	Dating Naked (Germany)	2	3
Germain Wolf	Are You the One?	2	3
Max Eggerstedt	Ex on the Beach Germany	3, 5	16
Michael "Micha" Schüler	Couple Challenge	3–4	15
Bobby Chambertz	Love Island Germany	3	11
Abi	—N/a	3	11
Marvin Opana	—N/a	3	11
Meggie	—N/a	3	7
Paola	—N/a	3	7
Ramona Jst	—N/a	3	5
Selina Felicitas	—N/a	3	5
Einfach Tobi	—N/a	3	3
Sahel	Ex on the Beach Germany	4–5	22
Bella	Love Fool Germany	4	11
Calvin Steiner	Temptation Island Germany	4	11
Daymian Weiß	Goodbye Deutschland	4	11
Enya Wandres	—N/a	4	11
Jermaine Diallo	—N/a	4	11
Oguzhan "Ozan" Gencel	Die Bachelorette	4	11
Soki	—N/a	4	11
Marcel "Wilson" Coenen	Are You the One?	4	10
Nailo	—N/a	4	5
Luisa Früh	Make Love Fake Love	4	4
Kristina "Tina" Rubi	—N/a	4	4
Sarah	—N/a	5	9
Jakub "Kuba" Luszczak	—N/a	5	8
Cansin Spada	Make Love Fake Love	5	11
Fabian Hesdahl	Too Hot To Handle Germany	5	11
Henna Schka	—N/a	5	3
Janice Barat	—N/a	5	11
Juliano Fernandez	Temptation Island VIP Germany	5	11
Lars Maucher	Die Bachelorette	5	7
Lily Lee	Miss Elite World China 2023	5	5
Matthew "MefYou" Möller	—N/a	5	11
Nadja Großmann	Love Fool Germany	5	11
Elia Garcia	Temptation Island Germany	5	6
Enes Futuro	Are You the One?	5	6
Paulina "Pauli" Sienna	—N/a	5	6
Honey	—N/a	5	3

==== Special guests ====
Cast member	Notability	Series	Episodes*
Calvin Kleinen	Temptation Island Germany	1	1
Melody Haase	—N/a	1	3
Elena Miras	Love Island Germany	1	2
Marina	—N/a	2	1
Nathan Henry	Geordie Shore	3	2
Gilda "La Giss" Provenzano	Italia Shore	6	0

- ^*: All episode counts are correct as of Series 5, episode 11.

=== Duration of cast ===
Current cast members
Cast members	Series 1											Series 2											Series 3											Series 4											Series 5											Series 6										
Cast members	1	2	3	4	5	6	7	8	9	10	11	1	2	3	4	5	6	7	8	9	10	11	1	2	3	4	5	6	7	8	9	10	11	1	2	3	4	5	6	7	8	9	10	11	1	2	3	4	5	6	7	8	9	10	11	1	2	3	4	5	6	7	8	9	10	11
Belly																																																																		
Jessy																																																																		
Walentina																																																																		
Paulina																																																																		
Tommy																																																																		
Bella																																																																		
Daymian																																																																		
Gigi																																																																		
Dagi																																																																		
Dominik																																																																		
Jason F																																																																		
Jason W																																																																		
Laurenz																																																																		
Lori																																																																		
Mara																																																																		
Ryan																																																																		
Selin																																																																		
Xenia																																																																		
Former cast members
Cast members	Series 1											Series 2											Series 3											Series 4											Series 5											Series 6										
Cast members	1	2	3	4	5	6	7	8	9	10	11	1	2	3	4	5	6	7	8	9	10	11	1	2	3	4	5	6	7	8	9	10	11	1	2	3	4	5	6	7	8	9	10	11	1	2	3	4	5	6	7	8	9	10	11	1	2	3	4	5	6	7	8	9	10	11
Henna																																																																		
Lily																																																																		
Pauli																																																																		
Lars																																																																		
Casin																																																																		
Fabian																																																																		
Janice																																																																		
Juliano																																																																		
Matthew																																																																		
Nadja																																																																		
Sahel																																																																		
Max																																																																		
Jona																																																																		
Sarah																																																																		
Kuba																																																																		
Elia G																																																																		
Enes																																																																		
Honey																																																																		
Nailo																																																																		
Soki																																																																		
Calvin S																																																																		
Enya																																																																		
Jermaine																																																																		
Ozan																																																																		
Micha																																																																		
Wilson																																																																		
Dana																																																																		
Julius																																																																		
Tina																																																																		
Luisa																																																																		
Tobi																																																																		
Meggie																																																																		
Paola																																																																		
Nunu																																																																		
Abi																																																																		
Marvin																																																																		
Hati																																																																		
Jessica																																																																		
Bobby																																																																		
Ramona																																																																		
Selina																																																																		
Fabio																																																																		
Germain																																																																		
Peter																																																																		
Antonia																																																																		
Dino																																																																		
Elia B																																																																		
Venance																																																																		
Emilija																																																																		
Mia																																																																		
Yasin																																																																		
Emanuel																																																																		
Danilo																																																																		
Silvio																																																																		
Nara																																																																		
Gina																																																																		
Nic																																																																		
Anthony																																																																		
Niko																																																																		
Special Guest
Calvin K																																																																		
Melody																																																																		
Elena																																																																		
Marina																																																																		
Nathan																																																																		

Notes

Key: = Cast member is featured in this episode.
Key: = Cast member arrives in the house.
Key: = Cast member voluntarily leaves the house.
Key: = Cast member is removed from the house.
Key: = Cast member leaves and returns to the house in the same episode.
Key: = Cast member joins the series, but leaves the same episode.
Key: = Cast member returns to the house.
Key: = Cast member features in this episode, but outside of the house.
Key: = Cast member does not feature in this episode.
Key: = Cast member leaves the series.
Key: = Cast member returns to the series.
Key: = Cast member is removed from the series.
Key: = Cast member features in this episode despite not being an official cast member at the time.
Key: = Cast member returns to the series, but leaves same episode.

== Episodes ==
=== Series overview ===
Series	Episodes	Originally aired			
Series	Episodes	OnePlus	3+	Joyn	MTV Germany
1	11	November 17, 2021– December 22, 2021	November 22, 2021– February 7, 2022	December 8, 2021– January 12, 2022	February 2, 2022– April 6, 2022
2	11	OnePlus	3+	Paramount+	MTV Germany
2	11	December 14, 2022– January 26, 2022	December 14, 2022– April 3, 2023	December 15, 2022– January 26, 2022	June 28, 2023– August 3, 2023
3	11	Paramount+		MTV Germany	
3	11	November 14, 2023– February 6, 2024		May 15, 2024– June 19, 2024	
4	11	November 19, 2024– February 11, 2025		September 11, 2025– October 16, 2025	
5	11	October 28, 2025– January 13, 2026		August 16, 2026– November 1,2026	
6	–	November 24, 2026–		–	

=== Series 1: Reality Shore (2021) ===
No. overall	No. in season	Title	Air date (OnePlus)	Air date (3+)	Air date (Joyn)	Air date (MTV)
1	1	"Episode 1"	November 17, 2021	November 22, 2021	December 8, 2021	February 2, 2022
2	2	"Episode 2"	November 17, 2021	November 22, 2021	December 8, 2021	February 2, 2022
3	3	"Episode 3"	November 24, 2021	January 10, 2022	December 15, 2021	February 9, 2022
4	4	"Episode 4"	November 24, 2021	January 10, 2022	December 15, 2021	February 16, 2022
5	5	"Episode 5"	December 1, 2021	January 17, 2022	December 22, 2021	February 23, 2022
6	6	"Episode 6"	December 1, 2021	January 17, 2022	December 22, 2021	March 2, 2022
7	7	"Episode 7"	December 8, 2021	January 24, 2022	December 29, 2021	March 9, 2022
8	8	"Episode 8"	December 8, 2021	January 24, 2022	December 29, 2021	March 16, 2022
9	9	"Episode 9"	December 15, 2021	January 31, 2022	January 5, 2022	March 23, 2022
10	10	"Episode 10"	December 15, 2021	January 31, 2022	January 5, 2022	March 30, 2022
11	11	"Episode 11"	December 22, 2021	February 7, 2022	January 12, 2022	April 6, 2022
–	–	"The Reunion"	December 22, 2021	February 7, 2022	January 12, 2022	April 6, 2022

=== Series 2 (2022) ===
No. overall	No. in season	Title	Air date (OnePlus)	Air date (Paramount+)	Air date (MTV)
12	1	"Episode 1"	December 14, 2022	December 15, 2022	June 28, 2023
13	2	"Episode 2"	December 14, 2022	December 15, 2022	June 28, 2023
14	3	"Episode 3"	December 21, 2022	December 22, 2022	July 5, 2023
15	4	"Episode 4"	December 21, 2022	December 22, 2022	July 5, 2023
16	5	"Episode 5"	December 28, 2022	December 29, 2022	July 12, 2023
17	6	"Episode 6"	December 28, 2022	December 29, 2022	July 12, 2023
18	7	"Episode 7"	January 4, 2023	January 5, 2023	July 19, 2023
19	8	"Episode 8"	January 4, 2023	January 5, 2023	July 19, 2023
20	9	"Episode 9"	January 11, 2023	January 12, 2023	July 26, 2023
21	10	"Episode 10"	January 11, 2023	January 12, 2023	July 26, 2023
22	11	"Episode 11"	January 18, 2023	January 19, 2023	August 2, 2023
−	−	"Best Of"	January 18, 2023	January 19, 2023	—N/a
−	−	"The Reunion"	January 26, 2023	January 26, 2023	August 2, 2023

=== Series 3 (2023–24) ===
No. overall	No. in season	Title	Air date (Paramount+)	Air date (MTV)
23	1	"Episode 1"	November 14, 2023	May 15, 2024
24	2	"Episode 2"	November 21, 2023	May 15, 2024
25	3	"Episode 3"	November 28, 2023	May 22, 2024
26	4	"Episode 4"	December 5, 2023	May 22, 2024
27	5	"Episode 5"	December 12, 2023	May 29, 2024
28	6	"Episode 6"	December 19, 2023	May 29, 2024
29	7	"Episode 7"	December 26, 2023	June 5, 2024
30	8	"Episode 8"	January 2, 2024	June 5, 2024
31	9	"Episode 9"	January 9, 2024	June 12, 2024
32	10	"Episode 10"	January 16, 2024	June 12, 2024
33	11	"Episode 11"	January 23, 2024	June 19, 2024
−	−	"Best Of"	January 30, 2024	—N/a
−	−	"The Reunion"	February 6, 2024	June 19, 2024

=== Series 4 (2024–25) ===
No. overall	No. in season	Title	Air date (Paramount+)	Air date (MTV)
34	1	"Episode 1"	November 19, 2024	September 11, 2025
35	2	"Episode 2"	November 26, 2024	September 11, 2025
36	3	"Episode 3"	December 3, 2024	September 18, 2025
37	4	"Episode 4"	December 10, 2024	September 18, 2025
38	5	"Episode 5"	December 17, 2024	September 25, 2025
39	6	"Episode 6"	December 24, 2024	September 25, 2025
40	7	"Episode 7"	December 31, 2024	October 2, 2025
41	8	"Episode 8"	January 7, 2025	October 2, 2025
42	9	"Episode 9"	January 14, 2025	October 9, 2025
43	10	"Episode 10"	January 21, 2025	October 9, 2025
44	11	"Episode 11"	January 28, 2025	October 16, 2025
–	–	"The Reunion"	February 11, 2025	October 16, 2025

=== Series 5 (2025–26) ===
No. overall	No. in season	Title	Air date (Paramount+)	Air date (MTV)
45	1	Episode 1	October 28, 2025	August 16, 2026
46	2	Episode 2	November 4, 2025	August 23, 2026
47	3	Episode 3	November 11, 2025	August 30, 2026
48	4	Episode 4	November 18, 2025	September 6, 2026
49	5	Episode 5	November 25, 2025	September 13, 2026
50	6	Episode 6	December 2, 2025	September 20, 2026
51	7	Episode 7	December 9, 2025	September 27, 2026
52	8	Episode 8	December 16, 2025	October 4, 2026
53	9	Episode 9	December 23, 2025	October 11, 2026
54	10	Episode 10	December 30, 2025	October 18, 2026
55	11	Episode 11	January 6, 2026	October 25, 2026
–	–	The Reunion	January 13, 2026	November 1, 2026

=== Series 6 (2026–27) ===
No. overall	No. in season	Title	Air date (Paramount+)	Air date (MTV)
56	1	Episode 1	November 24, 2026	TBA

== Spin-offs and specials ==
=== Germany Shore React ===
The first season premiered on November 16, 2023. It features Mike Heiter and Carina Ojiodu-Ambrose as commentators, who react to each episode of the third season of Germany Shore. Gianluigi "Gigi" Birofio also participated as a commentator in some episodes.

The second season premiered on November 21, 2024 with the return of Carina, now alongside Maurice Dziwak, as they react to episodes from the fourth season of Germany Shore.

The third season, which premiered on October 30, 2025, features Maurice alongside Laura Blond for the first time.

=== Germany Shore OG ===
This first spin-off featured the participation of Bellydah, Valentina Doronina, Jona Steinig, Hati Suarez, Tommy Pedroni and Paulina Ljubas. It premiered on November 5, 2024 and ended after three episodes.

The second season premiered on October 7, 2025. Tommy Pedroni and Paulina Ljubas returned for the second season, along with Fabio de Pasquale, Daymian Weiß and Luisa Früh, as well as Gianluigi "Gigi" Birofio before joining the show's fifth season.
