= List of Are You the One? episodes =

Are You the One? is an American reality television series featuring a group of men and women are secretly paired into couples via a matchmaking algorithm. While living together, the contestants try to identify all of these "perfect matches." If they succeed, the entire group shares a prize of up to $1 million.

== Series overview ==
Season	Episodes	Originally released		Cast members	All perfect matches found?	Total money won
Season	Episodes	First released	Last released	Cast members	All perfect matches found?	Total money won
1	10	January 21, 2014	March 25, 2014	20	✓	$1,000,000
2	10	October 6, 2014	December 8, 2014	21	✓	$1,000,000
3	10	September 24, 2015	November 18, 2015	20	✓	$750,000
4	10	June 13, 2016	August 22, 2016	20	✓	$750,000
5	10	January 11, 2017	March 15, 2017	22	✗	$0
6	12	September 20, 2017	December 6, 2017	22	✓	$1,000,000
7	14	August 15, 2018	November 7, 2018	22	✓	$1,000,000
8	12	June 26, 2019	September 9, 2019	16	✓	$750,000
9	10	January 18, 2023	March 15, 2023	22	✓	$750,000

== Episodes ==
=== Season 1 (2014) ===
No. overall	No. in season	Title	Original release date	U.S. viewers (millions)
1	1	"You Can't Handle the Truth"	January 21, 2014	N/A
2	2	"The Temptation of Chris T"	January 28, 2014	N/A
3	3	"A Real "G""	February 4, 2014	N/A
4	4	"Karma's a Bitch"	February 11, 2014	N/A
5	5	"Double Shot"	February 18, 2014	N/A
6	6	"Turn the Paige"	February 25, 2014	N/A
7	7	"It's So Hard... to Say Goodbye"	March 4, 2014	N/A
8	8	"Getting Dumped On"	March 11, 2014	N/A
9	9	"White Party"	March 18, 2014	N/A
10	10	"Run Down with a Happy Ending"	March 25, 2014	N/A

=== Season 2 (2014) ===
No. overall	No. in season	Title	Original release date	U.S. viewers (millions)
11	1	"One Too Many"	October 6, 2014	0.71
12	2	"The Truth Will Cost You"	October 13, 2014	0.65
13	3	"Virgin Tears"	October 20, 2014	0.63
14	4	"Loose Lips Sink Relationships"	October 27, 2014	0.58
15	5	"Strap Those Boots Tight"	November 3, 2014	0.68
16	6	"Parental Guidance"	November 10, 2014	0.80
17	7	"Hot Salsa"	November 17, 2014	0.65
18	8	"Dumped"	November 24, 2014	0.63
19	9	"Old Flames"	December 1, 2014	0.70
20	10	"One Switch, One Glitch"	December 8, 2014	0.92

=== Season 3 (2015) ===
No. overall	No. in season	Title	Original release date	U.S. viewers (millions)
21	1	"Once in a Lifetime Chance Brings Romance"	September 24, 2015	0.92
22	2	"Can't Buy Me Love"	September 30, 2015	0.51
23	3	"Libido Limbo"	October 7, 2015	0.69
24	4	"Mazed and Confused"	October 14, 2015	0.76
25	5	"The Little Merman"	October 21, 2015	0.59
26	6	"Getting Lei'd"	October 28, 2015	0.62
27	7	"Peanut Butter and Jealous"	November 4, 2015	0.67
28	8	"Sorry Dad"	November 11, 2015	0.73
29	9	"Breaking Point"	November 18, 2015	0.89
30	10	"Never Give Up on Love"	November 18, 2015	0.92

=== Season 4 (2016) ===
No. overall	No. in season	Title	Original release date	U.S. viewers (millions)
31	1	"Perfect Match at First Sight"	June 13, 2016	0.69
32	2	"Punch Drunk Love"	June 20, 2016	0.54
33	3	"She Don't Want You"	June 27, 2016	0.74
34	4	"Three's a Crowd"	July 11, 2016	0.70
35	5	"Beer Goggles"	July 18, 2016	0.69
36	6	"Mommas' Boys"	July 25, 2016	0.68
37	7	"Pulling Punches"	August 1, 2016	0.65
38	8	"Great Ex-pectations"	August 8, 2016	0.54
39	9	"All or Nothing"	August 15, 2016	0.74
40	10	"All or Nothing"	August 15, 2016	0.674

=== Season 5 (2017) ===
No. overall	No. in season	Title	Original release date	U.S. viewers (millions)
41	1	"Find Love Win Money"	January 11, 2017	0.78
42	2	"Playing the Game and Getting Played"	January 18, 2017	0.52
43	3	"Butthurt"	January 25, 2017	0.60
44	4	"Tyranny of Love"	February 1, 2017	0.64
45	5	"Sex, Lies, and Truth Booths"	February 8, 2017	0.63
46	6	"No Bro-Code"	February 15, 2017	0.68
47	7	"Party Hard, Love Harder"	February 22, 2017	0.67
48	8	"Relationship Rehab"	March 1, 2017	0.76
49	9	"Between a Rock and a Love Place"	March 8, 2017	0.63
50	10	"Eleven is the Magic Number"	March 15, 2017	0.62

=== Season 6 (2017) ===
No. overall	No. in season	Title	Original release date	U.S. viewers (millions)
51	1	"Swipe Right for Love"	September 20, 2017	0.47
52	2	"Shot Through the Heart"	September 27, 2017	0.54
53	3	"Love in Limbo"	October 4, 2017	0.47
54	4	"Bae-trayal"	October 11, 2017	0.50
55	5	"Jelly AF"	October 18, 2017	0.40
56	6	"Don't Come at Me Crazy"	October 25, 2017	0.57
57	7	"Sinking Relation-ships"	November 1, 2017	0.45
58	8	"Ex-tra Cray"	November 8, 2017	0.44
59	9	"Tale of Two Players"	November 15, 2017	0.51
60	10	"No Love in NOLA"	November 22, 2017	0.48
61	11	"Love By The Numbers"	November 29, 2017	0.51
62	12	"Playing With Fire"	December 6, 2017	0.64

=== Season 7 (2018) ===
No. overall	No. in season	Title	Original release date	U.S. viewers (millions)
63	1	"Leap of Fate"	August 15, 2018	0.48
64	2	"Flirt at Your Own Risk"	August 15, 2018	0.449
65	3	"With Frenemies Like These..."	August 22, 2018	0.54
66	4	"A Boyfriend by Any Other Name"	August 29, 2018	0.48
67	5	"Ex-tracurricular Activities"	September 5, 2018	0.45
68	6	"Spilling the Tea"	September 12, 2018	0.47
69	7	"He Loves Me Not"	September 19, 2018	0.42
70	8	"Beast Mode"	September 19, 2018	0.36
71	9	"I Want You to Want Me"	September 26, 2018	0.46
72	10	"Master Plan"	October 3, 2018	0.43
73	11	"Once Upon a Crazy Party Time"	October 10, 2018	0.422
74	12	"Caught on Kiss Cam"	October 17, 2018	0.47
75	13	"This is Nuts-a"	October 24, 2018	0.48
76	14	"It All Comes Down To This"	November 7, 2018	0.48

=== Season 8 (2019) ===
No. overall	No. in season	Title	Original release date	U.S. viewers (millions)
77	1	"Come One, Come All"	June 26, 2019	0.29 (MTV); 0.29 (VH1)
78	2	"Come One, Come All"	June 26, 2019	0.25 (MTV); 0.23 (VH1)
79	3	"This is Trash"	July 3, 2019	0.33
80	4	"We Come to Slay"	July 10, 2019	0.35
81	5	"There Was a Fivesome?"	July 17, 2019	0.51
82	6	"Hate to Burst Your Bubble"	July 24, 2019	0.40
83	7	"Red Flag Alert"	July 31, 2019	0.43
84	8	"This Sucks and Blows"	August 5, 2019	0.20
85	9	"Games Players Play"	August 12, 2019	0.35
86	10	"It All Comes Down to Jax"	August 19, 2019	0.23
87	11	"On to the Next"	September 2, 2019	0.24
88	12	"All or Nothing"	September 9, 2019	0.22

=== Season 9 (2023) ===
No. overall	No. in season	Title	Original release date
89	1	"How Far Would You Go For Love?"	January 18, 2023
90	2	"How Far Would You Go For Love?"	January 18, 2023
91	3	"Rollercoaster Relationships"	January 25, 2023
92	4	"Love Is Heaven, Finding It Is Hell"	February 1, 2023
93	5	"Wants And Needs"	February 8, 2023
94	6	"Down The Rabbit Hole"	February 15, 2023
95	7	"It Takes One To Know One"	February 22, 2023
96	8	"Striking Out"	March 1, 2023
97	9	"Kiss and Tell"	March 8, 2023
98	10	"You Were The One"	March 15, 2023

== Are You the One? Second Chances ==
No. in season	Title	Original release date	U.S. viewers (millions)
1	"Second Chances"	March 22, 2017	0.39
10 Perfect Match from all 5 seasons of Are You The One come together for a second chance to win love and money by competing in missions designed to test the strength of their relationship.
2	"Wound up in the V"	March 29, 2017	0.34
Ellie snaps when Nate's interest in pretty women distracts him from the game. Gio gets upset when Alicia spends time with her match. Tori finds herself at odds with Devin.
3	"Wolf of Match Street"	April 5, 2017	0.35
Perfect Matches try to overcome old baggage in their quest for success. Gio's dark side puts a strain on his relationship with Francesca and the house. Tori confronts her past with Morgan.
4	"The Gift of Love"	April 12, 2017	0.33
The house manipulates Carolina and Hayden's rocky relationship while Asaf tries to take his relationship with Kaylen to the next level. Things get wild during a game of strip flip cup.
5	"Playing Dirty"	April 19, 2017	0.32
Tori is concerned that her relationship with Morgan is in jeopardy. Someone spills an embarrassing secret about Rashida. Mike tries to prove his affection for Alicia.
6	"Blind Choice"	April 26, 2017	0.31
The Perfect Matches are put on the spot when a mission forces them to show a little PDA. The house is shocked by a surprise no one saw coming.
7	"Drive Me Crazy"	May 3, 2017	0.33
Mike takes a turn as "Puppet Master" when he tries to manipulate the other Perfect Matches. Cam makes a big mistake that threatens his relationship with Mikala.
8	"This or That"	May 10, 2017	0.30
Shanley and Adam ride an emotional rollercoaster. Devin reveals a devious plan. One Perfect Match grows closer together while another drifts apart.
9	"Over the Edge"	May 17, 2017	0.32
Cam and Mikala's relationship hangs in the balance. Tori and Morgan re-take their relationship to the next level. Temperatures flair when a Mission literally sends the Perfect Matches over the edge.
10	"The Long Haul"	May 24, 2017	0.34
The Perfect Matches are tested on how much they've learned about each other in a race to escape from Melbourne. The house comes to terms with their relationships.

== Specials ==
Season	Title	Original air date
1	"The Aftermath"	April 1, 2014
The reunion of all 20 people in the house talking about their experience and what happens after the show. Ethan and Amber get engaged.
1	"Special Delivery"	September 29, 2014
The cast of season 1, reunites for Ethan and Amber's baby shower. During this reunion, the gender of Ethan and Amber's baby was revealed to be a girl. Both parents-to-be got emotional at the sight of having a girl. There were also conflicts between Scali and Jacy, Shanley and Chris T, and Ryan and Adam. The end of the episode resulted in most conflicts being resolved.
2	"The Aftermath 2"	December 15, 2014
The cast reunites to discuss all of this season's secrets, drama, and unfinished business.
5	"Reunion: The Final Matchup"	March 15, 2017
After weeks of searching for love and playing for money, Terrence J reunites the cast to get insider info on the explosive moments, spill tea on the unseen drama, and reveal what's gone down since leaving the house.
5	"Beyond the Boom Boom Room"	May 24, 2017
Several cast members from the first 5 seasons look back on some crazy moments that weren't shown.
6	"I've Got 99 Problems Cuz I Can't Find the One"	September 13, 2017
Host Terrence J provides an exclusive look at the cast of season 6 and breaks down why the 22 singles are bad at relationships.
6	"Reunion: The Final Matchup Part 1"	December 13, 2017
After weeks of searching for love and playing for money, the Season 6 cast reunites to give insider info on the explosive moments, spill tea on the unseen drama, and reveal what's gone down since leaving the house.
6	"Reunion: The Final Matchup Part 2"	December 20, 2017
After weeks of searching for love and playing for money, the Season 6 cast reunites to give insider info on the explosive moments, spill tea on the unseen drama, and reveal what's gone down since leaving the house.
7	"Reunion: The Final Matchup"	November 14, 2018
The season 7 cast reunites to spill insider info on their most explosive moments, the romances that never aired and what's gone down since leaving the house.
