= Are You the One? =

American reality television series

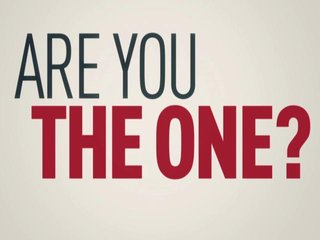
- Genre: Reality competition; Dating show
- Presented by: Ryan Devlin; Terrence J; Kamie Crawford
- Opening theme: "Smooth Hand" by Heavy Young Heathens
- Country of origin: United States
- Original language: English
- No. of seasons: 9
- No. of episodes: 98 (list of episodes)

Production
- Executive producers: Howard Schultz; Jeff Spangler; Rob LaPlante; Scott Jeffress
- Running time: 60 minutes (including commercials)
- Production companies: MTV Entertainment Studios; Lighthearted Entertainment; ITV Netherlands

Original release
- Network: MTV
- Release: January 21, 2014 – September 9, 2019
- Network: Paramount+
- Release: January 18 – March 15, 2023

Are You the One? is an American reality television series featuring a group of men and women that are secretly paired into couples via a matchmaking algorithm. While living together, the contestants try to identify all of these "perfect matches." If they succeed, the entire group shares a prize of up to $1 million. All couples in the first seven seasons were male-female, while in the eighth season a contestant's match could be someone of any gender.

Over the course of each season, the contestants go on dates with partners determined by competitions (or, in the seventh season only, by the "fate button"), and have the opportunity to learn in the "truth booth" if a given couple is a correct match. Once the truth booth confirms a perfect match, that couple will go to the honeymoon suite and will automatically be paired up for the remainder of the match ceremonies. At the end of each episode, the contestants pair up in a "matching ceremony" and learn how many perfect matches they have, but not which matches are correct. From season 3 onward, the prize was reduced any time that the house failed to identify any matches other than those already confirmed via the truth booth.

On June 26, 2019, the eighth season began broadcasting on MTV. This series was marked as the first to exclusively feature openly LGBT and sexually fluid contestants, a decision that was met with praise by outlets.

On March 3, 2022, it was announced that the show would be revived as an international version by Paramount+. On December 8, 2022, it was announced that Kamie Crawford would be the new host, and that the ninth season would premiere on January 18, 2023.

== Series overview ==
Season	Episodes	Originally released		Cast members	All perfect matches found?	Total money won
Season	Episodes	First released	Last released	Cast members	All perfect matches found?	Total money won
1	10	January 21, 2014	March 25, 2014	20	✓	$1,000,000
2	10	October 6, 2014	December 8, 2014	21	✓	$1,000,000
3	10	September 24, 2015	November 18, 2015	20	✓	$750,000
4	10	June 13, 2016	August 22, 2016	20	✓	$750,000
5	10	January 11, 2017	March 15, 2017	22	✗	$0
6	12	September 20, 2017	December 6, 2017	22	✓	$1,000,000
7	14	August 15, 2018	November 7, 2018	22	✓	$1,000,000
8	12	June 26, 2019	September 9, 2019	16	✓	$750,000
9	10	January 18, 2023	March 15, 2023	22	✓	$750,000

=== Season 1 ===
Filmed in Kauai, Hawaii and premiered on January 21, 2014. It featured 20 contestants looking for love in a chance to win a one million dollar prize to split.

=== Season 2 ===
Filmed in San Juan, Puerto Rico and premiered on October 6, 2014. This time, one guy has two matches which means that there will be eleven girls, but only ten boys. Christina is revealed as the first girl of the threeway couple. It is a race between Christina and another girl to find her perfect match and be confirmed as such in the Truth-Booth. The first couple of the threeway-couple to do so will end up in the honeymoon-suite. The other girl will have to leave empty-handed. However this only applied if one of those two matches were confirmed in the Truth Booth. If neither Christina nor the other girl get sent home, and the group wins the money by getting 10 matches at the matchup ceremony, then all 21 contestants will win money.

=== Season 3 ===
Filmed in Kona, Hawaii. Season three premiered on September 24, 2015. This season had a rule change, if there is a "black out" at a matchup ceremony (meaning no beams of light other than already-confirmed matches) then the house gets $250,000 deducted from their prize.

=== Season 4 ===
Filmed in Maui, Hawaii. Season four premiered on June 13, 2016.

=== Season 5 ===
Filmed in Cabarete, Dominican Republic. Season five premiered on January 11, 2017. This season featured 2 big changes. When a couple gets sent into the truth booth to see if they are a perfect match, the rest of the house can either vote to see if they are a perfect match, or earn $150,000, and not see the result of the couple. This only will pertain to certain weeks. Also, if the house blacks out at a match-up ceremony, their money will decrease by 50% each time instead of $250,000.

=== Season 6 ===
Filmed in New Orleans, Louisiana. Season six premiered on September 20, 2017.

=== Season 7 ===
Filmed in Kona, Hawaii, Hokukano Bayhouse. Season seven premiered on August 15, 2018. This season featured a change in the rules to get a date, the contestants no longer had to compete against each other to win a date. Instead, Terrance would choose two people, one guy and one girl, to come up and press a button stopping a scrolling wheel of faces at random of the opposite sex. Two guys and two girls would be chosen at random to go on a four-person date to couple off as they choose. Everyone back at the house then voted whichever couple they thought most likely to be a 'Perfect Match' into the Truth Booth.

=== Season 8 ===
Filmed in Kona, Hawaii. Season eight premiered on June 26, 2019. For the first time on Are You the One?, all cast members were sexually fluid, with no gender limitations on their potential perfect matches. This season received a GLAAD Media Award for Outstanding Reality Program in 2020.

=== Season 9 ===
Filmed in Gran Canaria, Spain. Season nine premiered on January 18, 2023.

== Are You the One? Second Chances ==
On March 22, 2017, spin-off Are You the One? Second Chances premiered. The series, filmed in Melbourne, Australia and hosted by Karamo Brown, featured ten perfect matches from previous seasons returning to compete in tasks designed to test the strength of their bonds. Each week, teams could add to their potential winnings, but individual contestants had the opportunity to take their team's winnings from their partner and remove their team from the game.

=== Cast ===
Male contestants	Female contestants	Original Season	Finish
Devin Walker-Molaghan	Rashida Beach	season 3	Winners
Morgan St. Pierre	Tori Deal	season 4	Runners-Up
Adam Kuhn	Shanley McIntee	season 1	3rd Place
Cameron Kolbo	Mikala Thomas	season 4	4th Place
Mike Cerasani	Alicia Wright	season 5	5th Place
Asaf Goren	Kaylen Zahara	season 4	6th Place
Hayden Weaver	Carolina Duarte	season 5	7th Place
Giovanni "Gio" Rivera	Francesca Duncan	season 4	8th Place
Nathan "Nate" Siebenmark	Ellie Puckett	season 2	9th Place
Derrick Henry	Casandra Martinez	season 5	10th Place

=== Elimination progress ===
Teams	Episodes									
Teams	1	2	3	4 (Note: In Episode 4, only the top 3 teams and the last place team were revealed. Therefore, the 3 teams whose placement wasn't revealed didn't have a change in money.)	5	6	7	8	9	10
Devin & Rashida	1st	6th	4th	N/A	1st	2nd	1st	2nd	1st	1st
Morgan & Tori	6th	3rd	1st	1st	2nd	4th	3rd	4th	2nd	2nd
Adam & Shanley	3rd	4th	2nd	N/A	4th	3rd	4th	1st	3rd	3rd
Cameron & Mikala	7th	5th	3rd	3rd	3rd	1st	2nd	3rd	4th	
Mike & Alicia	9th	1st	6th	2nd	5th	5th	5th			
Asaf & Kaylen	2nd	8th	8th	7th	6th					
Hayden & Carolina	8th	2nd	5th	N/A						
Giovanni & Francesca	5th	7th	7th							
Nate & Ellie	4th	9th								
Derrick & Casandra	10th									

Competition
The team won the final challenge
The team received 2nd place in the final challenge
The team received 3rd place in the final challenge
The team won the mission and was safe from elimination
The team was voted into The Choice and decided to 'Share' their money, therefore remaining in the game
The team received last place and was eliminated
The team did not receive last place but one team member stole the money and their team was eliminated
The team received last place but remained in the game due to another contestant, who got voted into The Choice, stole all of the money
The team was voted into The Choice, but was saved due to it being a non-elimination episode and it was not revealed if they decided to 'Share' or 'Steal' the money
The team received last place but was saved due to it being a non-elimination episode

=== Bank Accounts ===
Males	Episodes									
Males	1	2	3	4	5	6	7	8	9	10
Devin	$40,000	$40,000	$40,000	$40,000	$60,000	$70,000	$90,000	$100,000	$120,000	$170,000
Morgan	$20,000	$25,000	$45,000	$65,000	$75,000	$75,000	$80,000	$40,000	$50,000	$25,000
Adam	$25,000	$25,000	$35,000	$35,000	$35,000	$40,000	$40,000	$60,000	$60,000	$0
Cameron	$20,000	$20,000	$25,000	$30,000	$35,000	$55,000	$65,000	$65,000	$0	
Mike	$20,000	$40,000	$40,000	$50,000	$50,000	$25,000	$0			
Asaf	$30,000	$30,000	$15,000	$7,500	$0					
Hayden	$20,000	$30,000	$30,000	$30,000						
Giovanni	$20,000	$20,000	$0							
Nate	$20,000	$0								
Derrick	$0									

Females	Episodes									
Females	1	2	3	4	5	6	7	8	9	10
Rashida	$40,000	$40,000	$40,000	$40,000	$60,000	$70,000	$90,000	$100,000	$120,000	$170,000
Tori	$20,000	$25,000	$45,000	$65,000	$75,000	$75,000	$80,000	$40,000	$50,000	$25,000
Shanley	$25,000	$25,000	$35,000	$35,000	$35,000	$40,000	$40,000	$60,000	$60,000	$0
Mikala	$20,000	$20,000	$25,000	$30,000	$35,000	$55,000	$65,000	$65,000	$0	
Alicia	$20,000	$40,000	$40,000	$50,000	$50,000	$25,000	$0			
Kaylen	$30,000	$30,000	$15,000	$7,500	$0					
Carolina	$20,000	$30,000	$30,000	$0						
Francesca	$20,000	$20,000	$20,000							
Ellie	$20,000	$0								
Casandra	$0									

Competition
The team won the final challenge and shared the money.
The team received 2nd place in the final challenge.
The team received 3rd place in the final challenge.
The team won the mission and was safe from elimination.
The team was voted into The Choice and decided to 'Share' their money, therefore remaining in the game.
The team received last place and was eliminated.
The team received last place but remained in the game due to another contestant, who got voted into The Choice, stealing the money from their partner, and remained in the game.
The contestant was voted into The Choice and decided to 'Steal' the money, but their teammate decided to 'Share' the money and they were eliminated with all of the money.
The contestant was voted into The Choice and decided to 'Share' the money, but their teammate decided to 'Steal' the money and they were eliminated with no money.
The contestant was voted into The Choice and was saved due to it being a non-elimination episode. Their choice was not revealed if they Shared or Stole the money.
The contestant received last place but was saved due to it being a non-elimination episode.

== International versions ==
Country	Local title	Host(s)	Channel	Broadcast	Jackpot
Brazil	Are You the One? Brasil	Felipe Titto (1–3); Caio Castro (4)	MTV	February 1, 2015	R$500,000
Czech Republic	Are You the One? Česko	Petr Havránek, Gabriela Gášpárová	TV Prima	June 8, 2026	2,500,000 CZK
Denmark	Det perfekte match	Oliver Bjerrehuus	Kanal 4	February 5, 2015	
France	10 couples parfaits	Elsa Fayer	NT1 and TFX	July 3, 2017	€200,000
Germany	Are You the One?	Jan Köppen (1); Sophia Thomalla (2-)	TVNOW; RTL	April 14, 2020 (TVNOW); May 6, 2020 (RTL)	€200,000
Italy	Are You the One? Italia	Luca Vezil	Paramount+	February 15, 2023	€200,000
Mexico	Are You the One? El Match Perfecto	Roberto Carlo (1); Vadhir Derbez (2)	MTV LA	September 20, 2016	US$200,000
Netherlands	Are You the One? De Perfecte Match	Kaj Gorgels	MTV NL	October 15, 2021	€200,000
Sweden	Are You the One? Sverige	Martin Björk	TV3	February 26, 2018	1,000,000 kr
United Kingdom	Are You the One? UK	Joelah Noble	MTV UK; Paramount+	August 8, 2022	£200,000
