= Love Island (German TV series) =

- Also known as: Love Island – Heiße Flirts & wahre Liebe
- Genre: Reality
- Created by: Richard Cowles
- Presented by: Jana Ina; Giovanni Zarrella (Final, 1); Cathy Hummels (4); Sylvie Meis (6)
- Narrated by: Christoph Kröger
- Country of origin: Germany
- Original language: German
- No. of seasons: 6
- No. of episodes: 110

Production
- Production locations: Mallorca, Spain
- Running time: 60–90 minutes (incl. adverts)

Original release
- Network: RTL II
- Release: 11 September 2017 – present

Love Island, also known as Love Island – Heiße Flirts & wahre Liebe (English: Love Island – Hot Flirts & True Love), is a German dating reality show based on the British series Love Island. The first five seasons were presented by Jana Ina and the sixth one by Sylvie Meis. The series is narrated by Christoph Kröger. The series began airing on RTL II on September 11, 2017.

== Contributors ==
Jana Ina is presenting the show from first season and with Christoph Kröger been the Narrated for the first two seasons and from third season is Simon Beeck. In the first season Ina was presenting the final with her husband Giovanni Zarrella. In season 4, Cathy Hummels presented some episodes because Jana Ina was tested positive for COVID-19.

Season	Presenters		Narrator
1	Jana Ina	Giovanni Zarrella	Christoph Kröger
2	Jana Ina		Christoph Kröger
3	Jana Ina		Simon Beeck
4	Jana Ina	Cathy Hummels	Simon Beeck
5	Jana Ina		Simon Beeck
6	Sylvie Meis		Simon Beeck
7	Sylvie Meis		Simon Beeck
8	Sylvie Meis		Simon Beeck

== Series overview ==
Season	Start date	Finale date	Islanders	Winners	Prize money	Average viewers (millions)	Episodes
1	11 September 2017	2 October 2017	23	Elena Miras and Jan Sokolowsky	€50,000	0.60	22
2	10 September 2018	1 October 2018	21	Tracy Candela and Marcellino "Lino" Kremers	€50,000	0.88	31
3	9 September 2019	7 October 2019	24	Vivien Michalla and Sidney Wolf	€50,000	0.77	25
4	31 August 2020	28 September 2020	25	Melina Hoch and Tim Kühnel	€50,000	0.66	25
5	8 March 2021	29 March 2021	22	Bianca Jule and Paco Harb	€50,000	TBA	19
6	31 August 2021	27 September 2021	25	Isabell Kremer and Robin Widmann	€50,000	TBA	25
7	21 March 2022	11 April 2022	22	Jennifer Iglesias and Nico Einfech	€50,000	TBA	24
8	4 September 2023	2 October 2023	22	Jenny Grassl and Luca Müller	€50,000	TBA	24
