= The Challenge: Champs vs. Pros =

Champs vs. Pros
- Presented by: Victor Cruz
- No. of contestants: 20
- Winners: Cara Maria Sorbello; Darrell Taylor
- Location: Los Angeles, California
- No. of episodes: 6

Release
- Original network: MTV
- Original release: May 16 – June 20, 2017

Season chronology
- Next → Champs vs. Stars

The Challenge: Champs vs. Pros is a special mini-series of MTV's long-running reality game show, The Challenge. In the six-week event, ten Challenge greats competed against ten professional athletes. The series premiered on Tuesday, May 16, 2017, and concluded on June 20, 2017. The series was hosted by NFL wide receiver Victor Cruz. Contestants competed to win $50,000 to donate to the charity of their choice. In 2017 the series format was changed to include celebrities and was renamed Champs vs. Stars.

The format featured alumni from The Real World, Road Rules, and The Challenge, competing with athletes who have participated in professional leagues and events such as the National Football League, Women's National Basketball Association, Ultimate Fighting Championship, World Surfing Championship, along with the Winter and Summer Olympics.

== Contestants ==
Player	Known For	Team	Charity	Raised	Finish
Cara Maria Sorbello	The Challenge: Fresh Meat II	Champs	ASPCA	$55,000 (Note: After winning final challenge Cara Maria agreed to give $5,000 of her prize money to each of Wes and Camila's charities.)	Winner
Darrell Taylor	Road Rules: Campus Crawl	Champs	March of Dimes	$55,000	Winner
Kamerion Wimbley	Retired NFL linebacker	Pros	Kamerion Wimbley Foundation	$1,000	Runner-up
Lindsey Jacobellis	Snowboarder and Olympic medalist	Pros	ASPCA	$5,000	Runner-up
Camila Nakagawa	Spring Break Challenge	Champs	Men With Dreams	$1,000	Third place
Wes Bergmann	The Real World: Austin	Champs	American Cancer Society	$1,000	Third place
Chris "CT" Tamburello	The Real World: Paris	Champs	Grayken Center for Addiction Medicine	$5,000	Episode 6
Gus Kenworthy	Skier and Olympic medalist	Pros	The Trevor Project and Happy Hippie Foundation	$1,000	Episode 6
Louise Hazel	Heptathlete and Olympian	Pros	Save the Children	$5,000 (Note: After both being eliminated Louise and Lolo agreed to pool their prize money together and split it $3,000 to each of their charities.)	Episode 6
Lolo Jones	Olympic hurdler and bobsledder	Pros	Hurdles of Hope	$1,000	Episode 6
Ashley Mitchell	Real World: Ex-Plosion	Champs	Facing Addiction	$1,000 (Note: After defeating Ashley in elimination Lolo agreed to give $5,000 of her own personal money to Ashley's charity, raising Ashley's total raised to $6,000.)	Episode 5
Louie Vito	Snowboarder and Olympian	Pros	Wings for Life	$1,000	Episode 5
Jordan Wiseley	The Real World: Portland	Champs	Lucky Fin Project	$5,000	Episode 4
CM Punk	Professional Wrestler	Pros	PAWS Chicago	$1,000	Episode 4
Tia Blanco	Surfer and World Champion	Pros	St. Jude's Children's Hospital	$1,000	Episode 3/4
Ashley Kelsey	The Real World: San Diego (2011)	Champs	Make-A-Wish Foundation	$1,000	Episode 3
Johnny "Bananas" Devenanzio	The Real World: Key West	Champs	Special Olympics	$1,000	Episode 2
Shawne Merriman	Retired NFL linebacker	Pros	Lights On Foundation	$1,000	Episode 2
Candice Wiggins	Retired WNBA Player	Pros	Greater Than AIDS	$1,000	Episode 1
Veronica Portillo	Road Rules: Semester at Sea	Champs	Planned Parenthood	$1,000	Episode 1

Charity money shared

== Gameplay ==
=== Challenge games ===
- Against the Ropes: Similar to the original challenge "Piggy Back" from Free Agents, teams are separated into two groups of five. Then, each group has to advance on hanging ropes from one platform to another that is suspended above water. After one player advances onto one rope, the next teammate has to use the first player as a "human bridge" in order to advance to the next rope. Subsequent players will continue the process, until each player is hanging into their own rope, at which point, players will continue to use their teammates as "human bridges" in order to reach the opposite platform. The team that gets the most players across wins.
  - Winners: Pros
- Tailgate BBQ: Similar to the original challenge "Sausage Party" from Free Agents, players have to roll themselves along a "barbecue-style" obstacle course, while covered in shrink wrap. Each player will wiggle and roll through a variety of "condiments" and on oversize metal bars that resemble a grill grate, and toward place mats with hot dog labels on them. Certain players from each team will have to hold a "chip" bag in their mouth. If they do not hold it in their mouth the entire way through, a two-minute penalty will be added to their team total. The team with the shortest time wins.
  - Winners: Champs
- Out of Bounds: Similar to the original challenge "Pole Push" from The Gauntlet III, played in same-sex rounds. A pole is situated in the middle of a large rectangular pit surrounded by water. Pros and Champs will go head to head to try to push their opponent into the water. The team with the most points at the end wins.
  - Winners: Pros
- Keep Your Eyes On The Prize: Similar to the original challenge "Don't Forget About Me" from Battle of the Exes II, teams will have to split up into groups. One team member will lift up a steel door out of the sand that is connected to a memory puzzle for as long as they can. Two other team members will try to memorize one row at a time. Those two team members will tell another two team members what the row combination is. Those two people will then sprint to their last team member and tell them what the row is. If the row is wrong, they will have to take that whole row down and restart that row. The team who finishes first wins.
  - Winners: Champs
- Over the Line: Similar to the original challenge "Reaching Out" from The Duel, two members of each team will be strapped to the end of a rope that is connected to the other ropes that are being used and each member will also have a small football in their hand. On go, the team members must work together to pull their opponents to their line on the boundary of the challenge. Once each member gets their football over the line, they will score a point. The first team to score three times wins.
  - Winners: Champs
- No Guts No Glory: Played individually and in two rounds - one for guys and one for girls – players must select a plate of food they would like to eat – either an entree, side dish or dessert – to earn a colored ball. Balls are worth different numbers of points depending on which table they came from with entrees worth the most and desserts worth the least. Once a player has a ball, they must shoot it into a hoop at the far end of the course. The top guy and girl from each team will be declared the winners and advance to the finals together as a pair. The next best individual finisher will also earn a spot in the final, along with a member of their choosing from their own team.
  - Winners: Camila, Cara Mara, Darrell, Kamerion and Lindsey
  - Chosen to run the final: Wes
  - Eliminated: CT, Gus, Lolo and Louise

=== Arena games ===
- Pull No Punches: Similar to the original "Wrecking Wall" from Free Agents, each player must punch through a 30-foot dry wall to make holes so they can climb up until they can reach a bell. The first player to ring the bell wins the elimination round.
  - Played by: Ashley M. vs. Veronica and Candice vs. Lolo
- Blindsided: Similar to the original "Snapper" from Rivals II, played within a large circle, players have to swing and break a wooden stick at their opponent, while blindfolded. The blindfolded players will be wearing bells on their shoes and guided by their partners, who are standing outside of the circle. The player that breaks a stick on their opponent two times, wins the elimination.
  - Played by: CM Punk vs. Shawne and Johnny vs. Wes
- Basket Brawl: Similar to the original "Balls In" from The Inferno II, Free Agents, and Invasion of the Champions, each player will be given five chances to get as many balls inside a barrel, located in the middle of a large circle. If a player is either knocked out of or steps out of the ring, or if the ball is knocked out of the ring, their ball is considered "dead." Players will alternate between offense and defense in each round. To make things harder, the barrel is elevated and they are given a medicine ball.
  - Played by: Ashley K. vs. Ashley M. and Lolo vs. Tia
- Ice Bath: Similar to the original "Chill Out" from Rivals III, players will have to submerge their arms into a bucket full of ice water for 1 minute. They will then have to unlock a series of locks to reveal a slide puzzle. They will then have to solve the puzzle. If the puzzle is not unlocked or solved within 2 minutes, they will then have to submerge their arms in the ice bucket again for another minute. The first player to solve their puzzle first wins.
  - Played by: CM Punk vs. Gus and Jordan vs. Wes
- Going the Distance: Similar to "Spool" from The Ruins and "Knot So Fast" from Battle of the Seasons (2012) and Invasion of the Champions, players have to untangle two-hundred feet of heavy rope from a low rectangular structure. The first to untangle their rope wins.
  - Played by: Louie vs. Wes and Ashley M. vs. Lolo

== Game summary ==
Episode		Gender	Winners		Arena contestants				Arena game	Arena outcome	
#	Challenge	Gender	Team	Captain	Losing Captain	Voted In	Captain's Pick	Voted In	Arena game	Winner	Loser
1	Against the Ropes	Female	Pros	Louise	Ashley M.	Veronica	Candice	Lolo	Pull No Punches	Ashley M.	Veronica
1	Against the Ropes	Female	Pros	Louise	Ashley M.	Veronica	Candice	Lolo	Pull No Punches	Lolo	Candice
2	Tailgate BBQ	Male	Champs	Jordan	CM Punk	Shawne	Wes	Bananas	Blindsided	CM Punk	Shawne
2	Tailgate BBQ	Male	Champs	Jordan	CM Punk	Shawne	Wes	Bananas	Blindsided	Wes	Bananas
3/4	Out of Bounds	Female	Pros	Lindsey	Ashley M.	Ashley K.	Lolo	Tia	Basket Brawl	Ashley M.	Ashley K.
3/4	Out of Bounds	Female	Pros	Lindsey	Ashley M.	Ashley K.	Lolo	Tia	Basket Brawl	Lolo	Tia
4	Keep Your Eyes On The Prize	Male	Champs	Darrell	Gus	CM Punk	Wes	Jordan	Ice Bath	Gus	CM Punk
4	Keep Your Eyes On The Prize	Male	Champs	Darrell	Gus	CM Punk	Wes	Jordan	Ice Bath	Wes	Jordan
5	Over The Line	Male	Champs	CT	Louie	—N/a	Wes	—N/a	Going the Distance	Wes	Louie
5	Over The Line	Female	Champs	Cara Maria	Lolo	—N/a	Ashley M.	—N/a	Going the Distance	Lolo	Ashley M.
6	No Guts, No Glory	—N/a		Cara Maria	—N/a						CT
6	No Guts, No Glory	—N/a		Darrell	—N/a						CT
6	No Guts, No Glory	—N/a		Camila (Note: For being the top finishers from their teams in the No Guts No Glory challenge, Cara Maria & Darrell and Kamerion & Lindsey each formed a pair to take into the final challenge as a team. As the next highest placing individual, Camila was able to choose one other member from her team to take to the final with her to form the last pair. She chose Wes.)	—N/a						CT
6	No Guts, No Glory	—N/a		Wes	—N/a						CT
6	No Guts, No Glory	—N/a		Kamerion	—N/a						Gus
6	No Guts, No Glory	—N/a		Lindsey	—N/a						Lolo
6	No Guts, No Glory	—N/a		Lindsey	—N/a						Louise
6	Final Challenge	—N/a	Darrell & Cara Maria		2nd place: Kamerion & Lindsey; 3rd place: Wes & Camila						

=== Episode progress ===
Contestants	Episodes						
Contestants	1	2	3	4	5	6	
Cara Maria	SAFE	SAFE	SAFE	SAFE	WIN	WON	WINNER
Darrell	SAFE	SAFE	SAFE	WIN	SAFE	WON	WINNER
Kamerion	SAFE	SAFE	SAFE	SAFE	SAFE	WON	SECOND
Lindsey	SAFE	SAFE	WIN	SAFE	SAFE	WON	SECOND
Camila	SAFE	SAFE	SAFE	SAFE	SAFE	WON	THIRD
Wes	SAFE	ELIM	SAFE	ELIM	ELIM	SAVE	THIRD
CT	SAFE	SAFE	SAFE	SAFE	WIN	LAST	
Gus	SAFE	SAFE	SAFE	ELIM	SAFE	LAST	
Lolo	ELIM	SAFE	ELIM	SAFE	ELIM	LAST	
Louise	WIN	SAFE	SAFE	SAFE	SAFE	LAST	
Ashley M.	ELIM	SAFE	ELIM	SAFE	OUT		
Louie	SAFE	SAFE	SAFE	SAFE	OUT		
Jordan	SAFE	WIN	SAFE	OUT			
CM Punk	SAFE	ELIM	SAFE	OUT			
Tia	SAFE	SAFE	OUT				
Ashley K.	SAFE	SAFE	OUT				
Bananas	SAFE	OUT					
Shawne	SAFE	OUT					
Candice	OUT						
Veronica	OUT						

Teams
The contestant is on the Champs team.
The contestant is on Pros team.
Competition
The contestant won the final challenge.
The contestant did not win the final challenge.
The contestant was the winning team captain and was safe from the Arena.
The contestant won the challenge and advanced to the final challenge.
The contestant was chosen to go to the final by one of their teammates.
The contestant was not selected for the Arena.
The contestant won in the Arena.
The contestant lost in the Arena and was eliminated..
The contestant didn't win the challenge and wasn't picked to be in the final challenge and was eliminated.

== Voting progress ==
Captain's Pick	Ashley M. losing captain	Candice; 1 of 1 vote	CM Punk losing captain	Wes; 1 of 1 vote	Ashley M. losing captain		Lolo; 1 of 1 vote		Gus losing captain		Wes; 1 of 1 vote	Louie losing captain	Lolo losing captain
Voted Into Arena	Veronica consensus	Lolo random draw	Shawne; 5 of 8 votes	Bananas; 4 of 7 votes	Tie Vote	Ashley K. 1 of 1 vote	Tie Vote	Tia; 1 of 1 vote	Tie Vote	CM Punk; 1 of 1 vote	Jordan; 5 of 5 votes	Wes; 1 of 1 vote	Ashley M. 1 of 1 vote
Voter	Episodes												
Voter	1		2		3/4				4			5	
Cara Maria				Bananas	Ashley K.						Jordan		Ashley M.
Darrell				Bananas	Ashley K.						Wes		
Lindsey			Shawne				Lolo		Kamerion				
Kamerion			Shawne				Louise		CM Punk				
Camila				Darrell	Camila						Jordan		
Wes					Cara Maria						Jordan		
CT				Bananas	Ashley K.						Jordan	Wes	
Gus			Shawne				Louise			CM Punk			
Lolo			Shawne					Tia	Louie				
Louise		Candice	Unknown				Tia		Kamerion				
Ashley M.				Bananas		Ashley K.					Jordan		
Louie			Unknown				Tia		CM Punk				
Jordan				Wes	Cara Maria						Jordan		
CM Punk							Tia		Louie				
Tia			Unknown				Louise						
Ashley K.				CT	Cara Maria								
Bananas				Unknown									
Shawne			Shawne										
Candice													
Veronica													

== Episodes ==
No. overall	No. in season	Title	Original release date	US viewers (millions)
1	1	"Secrets and Limes"	May 16, 2017	0.57
2	2	"Settling the Scores"	May 23, 2017	0.53
3	3	"Watch Out for the Wolfpack"	May 30, 2017	0.63
4	4	"A Cold Day in Hell"	June 6, 2017	0.60
5	5	"Immovable Objections"	June 13, 2017	0.58
6	6	"No Guts No Glory"	June 20, 2017	0.53
