= The Challenge: Invasion of the Champions =

29th season of the reality television series

Invasion of the Champions
- Season 29
- Presented by: T. J. Lavin
- No. of contestants: 26
- Winners: Chris "CT" Tamburello; Ashley Mitchell
- Location: Krabi, Thailand
- No. of episodes: 16 (Reunion Included)

Release
- Original network: MTV
- Original release: February 7 – May 16, 2017

Season chronology
- ← Previous; Rivals III Next → XXX: Dirty 30

The Challenge: Invasion of the Champions (originally promoted and titled as The Challenge: Invasion) is the 29th season of the MTV reality game show, The Challenge. The new individual format was filmed in Krabi, Thailand during October and November 2016, and features alumni from The Real World, Road Rules, The Challenge, and Are You the One? competing.

The season premiered on February 7, 2017, and concluded with the reunion special on May 16, 2017.

== Format ==
The game started off with 18 "Underdogs" (players who have yet to win a challenge) who get dropped off a boat and onto a beach, where they were living in "The Shelter," which has bare bones housing. They compete individually in challenges, followed by an elimination round. The male and female winners of the challenge would be safe from elimination, and earn their ticket to "The Oasis" — the season house. The last-place finishers of each gender automatically went straight into elimination for the first challenge.

In the second challenge, the challenge winners choose a player of the opposite gender to go into the elimination. The remainder of the cast then voted in who goes against them for the first and second challenge. The males vote for the females, and vice versa.

In the third challenge, and the last chance to earn a ticket to the Oasis, the winners are safe from elimination, and the two remaining players of each gender automatically compete against each other. The winners of the elimination round would return to the game, and earn a ticket to The Oasis. Players could not go into The Oasis until every ticket had been earned. Players who earned their ticket to the Oasis are exempt from elimination and do not compete in challenges until the Champions enter the game.

In Episode 5, eight former champions (four male, four female) enter the game, which becomes a team competition - Underdogs vs. Champions. Each challenge is designated as either an Underdog or a Champion elimination. The winning team earns money in their team bank account depending on the challenge. The best performing male and female of the team designated for the challenge then choose one player of each gender to go into the elimination. The remainder of the cast vote in the players to go against the nominated players in The Fortress. The winners return to the game, and the losers are eliminated.

== Contestants ==
Male contestants	Original season	Finish
Chris "CT" Tamburello (Note: Rivals II)	The Real World: Paris	Winner
Nelson Thomas	Are You the One? 3	Runner-up
Cory Wharton	Real World: Ex-Plosion	Third place
Darrell Taylor (Note: The Gauntlet) (Note: The Inferno) (Note: The Inferno II) (Note: Fresh Meat)	Road Rules: Campus Crawl	Episode 13
Shane Landrum	Road Rules: Campus Crawl	Episode 12
Hunter Barfield	Are You the One? 3	Episode 11
Johnny "Bananas" Devenanzio (Note: The Island) (Note: The Ruins) (Note: Rivals) (Note: Battle of the Exes) (Note: Free Agents) (Note: Rivals III)	The Real World: Key West	Episode 10
Dario Medrano	Are You the One? 2	Episode 8
Zach Nichols (Note: Battle of the Seasons)	The Real World: San Diego (2011)	Episode 7
Tony Raines	Real World: Skeletons	Episode 6
Anthony Bartolotte	Are You the One? 2	Episode 4
Theo King-Bradley	Real World Seattle: Bad Blood	Episode 3 (Note: Theo was disqualified from elimination for refusing to jump off the cliff. As a result, Cory was declared the winner by default.)
Bruno Bettencourt	Real World: Skeletons	Episode 2

Female contestants	Original season	Finish
Ashley Mitchell	Real World: Ex-Plosion	Winner
Camila Nakagawa	Spring Break Challenge	Runner-up
Nicole Zanatta	Real World: Skeletons	Third place
Laurel Stucky	The Challenge: Fresh Meat II	Episode 12
Amanda Garcia	Are You the One? 3	Episode 11
Jenna Compono	Real World: Ex-Plosion	Episode 11
Cara Maria Sorbello (Note: Battle of the Bloodlines)	The Challenge: Fresh Meat II	Episode 10
Sylvia Elsrode	Real World: Skeletons	Episode 8
Ashley Kelsey	The Real World: San Diego (2011)	Episode 7
Kailah Casillas	Real World: Go Big or Go Home	Episode 6
LaToya Jackson	The Real World: St. Thomas	Episode 4
Anika Rashaun	Real World Seattle: Bad Blood	Episode 3
Marie Roda	The Real World: St. Thomas	Episode 2

Champion of

== Gameplay ==
=== Challenge games ===
- The Over Under: Players start by grabbing a bucket and filling it with mud. They will have to use the mud to try and get over a huge wall that is made up of bamboo poles. After they get over the first wall, they go to a second wall and dig their way under the wall. After they get under the second wall, they go to a tied idol and try and get the idol out from a tricky rope maze.
  - Winners: Dario & Nicole
- Shell Shocked: Players are paired up into male and female teams. Each team must row an unstable boat to four checkpoints. At each checkpoint, they retrieve a bag of coconuts. Once all of the bags are collected, they return to the starting line where they shoot the coconuts into a basket. The basket is connected to a pole with a weight behind it. The more coconuts they shoot into the basket, the higher the weight goes. The first team to lift the weight wins.
  - Winners: Hunter & Ashley M.
- Caged and Confused: Players are trapped inside a cage hanging on a rope. They pull a rope that will make them spin down to the ground. Each player then must roll to the finish line while still inside their cage. When they reach the finish line, they pull a rope towards them that is connected to a coconut, with a key attached. They use the key to unlock the cage and get out. The player that gets out of the cage first wins. The two remaining players are automatically nominated for elimination.
  - Winners: Shane & Amanda
- Knockout: A ball is catapulted towards the teams. Each team battles to get the ball into their respective goal. The game is played in two separate heats — one for each gender. The team that scores three points, that can be scored in both heats, wins.
  - Individual Winners: Ashley M. & Dario
  - Winning Team: Underdogs
- Roll With The Punches: Played in male/female pairs, and two pairs at a time, each pair spends three minutes in a spinning wheel made out of four beams that is suspended above water. Each contestant must leap from beam to beam as many times as possible without falling into the water. A pair accumulates one point for each rotation, and the team who accumulates the most points wins.
  - Individual Winners: Bananas & Laurel
  - Winning Team: Champions
- Curry Up: Contestants from each team must solve a puzzle, by consuming a bowl of curry soup at two different stations while racing three miles to their designated puzzle station. The curry bowls at the first stations are spicy, and are spicier at the second station. Underneath the bowls are place mats that represent puzzle pieces that each team can drop off at their designated puzzle station. Each bowl of soup must be empty before a team can take their place mats and race to their puzzle station. The first team to complete their puzzle wins.
  - Individual Winners: Hunter & Nicole
  - Winning Team: Champions
- Fallout: A large, slippery platform is suspended above water. Played in separate male/female heats, each contestant attempts to grab one of two ropes, and hang on for as long as possible. When the platform pivots like a seesaw, players end up sliding into and knocking other players into the water, making it difficult to hang onto the ropes. When a player falls into the water, his/her time is stopped, and the team with the longest cumulative time hanging on the ropes wins.
  - Individual Winners: Cory & Camila
  - Winning Team: Underdogs
- Crossover: Played in male/female pairs, each player must traverse a series of inflatable tubes that are attached to a moving speedboat. One player starts at one tube, while his/her partner starts on the opposite end. They encounter each other in the middle, and once each player has reached the opposite side, they have to pull themselves toward the boat and retrieve a flag within a three-minute time limit. A pairs' time is stopped once each player has grabbed their flags. The team that retrieves their flag in the fastest average time wins.
  - Winning Team: Underdogs
- X-It: In the first Underdog Bloodbath game, players are harnessed up to an "X" structure. They will grab the puzzle pieces of their color and throw them to their table. Each piece corresponds to a number represented by a symbol. Once they retrieve all of their bags, they must then unhook themselves and solve an ancient puzzle. Each column and row must have the puzzle pieces add up to 21. Pieces of the same symbol can not be used twice in a row or column. The last male and female to complete this task are eliminated.
  - Eliminated: Hunter & Jenna
- Caved In: Players navigate through a series of cages by going through small doors. However, each cage has an obstacle that the team must work through to get to the right door. If a team chooses the wrong door, it gets them back to the previous cage. The team that gets through all of the cages wins.
  - Winning Team: Underdogs

=== Elimination games ===
- In The Trenches: Similar to "Hall Pass" from Battle of the Exes, players start at opposite end of the trench, they have to transfer ten sandbags from one side to the other side.
  - Played By: Kailah vs. Marie and Tony vs. Bruno
- Who's Got Balls?: Players have to jump off a platform while holding on to a total of five balls. The player that holds on to the most balls win. If both opponents hold on to the same amount of balls, the winner is determined by the time it took them to jump off.
  - Played By: Jenna vs. Anika and Cory vs. Theo
- Thai Rise: Players race up to the top of the Tiger Cave Temple, and retrieve a bag of rice that has a bell in it. Once they get the bag, they race back down and hang their bell. The player to do this task the fastest wins.
  - Played By: Sylvia vs. LaToya and Nelson vs. Anthony
- Tuk Tuk Bang Bang: Players stand on the back of a tuk tuk, and have to push their tuk tuk further and further until they reach the end of the driveway, knocking over the wall in the end. The first player to do so wins.
  - Played By: Sylvia vs. Kailah and Shane vs. Tony
- Pole Wrestle: Similar to the original "Pole Wrestle" from The Duel, players are placed at the center of a circle and place both hands on a wooden pole. The first contestant to wrestle the pole out of the opponent's hands twice, wins.
  - Played By: Cara Maria vs. Ashley K. and Darrell vs. Zach
- Bell Ringer: Players have to break Thai idols using a rope connected to a bell suspended 15 feet above them. As the idols are being smashed, they release powder, making it more difficult for the players to see. The first player to smash all 16 idols wins.
  - Played By: Nelson vs. Dario and Jenna vs. Sylvia
- Balls In: Similar to the original "Balls In" from The Inferno II, Spring Break Challenge and Free Agents, each player is given five chances to get as many balls inside a barrel, located in the middle of a large circle. If a player is either knocked out of or steps out of the ring, or if the ball is knocked out of the ring, their ball is considered "dead". Players alternates between offense and defense in each round. The player who gets to three points wins, with each ball being worth a point.
  - Played by: Darrell vs. Bananas and Laurel vs. Cara Maria
- Inside Out: In the first round between the three initial players, the players are harnessed to a rope tied behind their back to a ring in a game similar to "Reverse Tug-O-War" and "Looper" from The Gauntlet 2 and Free Agents, respectively. The first player to ring their bell wins that round while the two remaining losing players face off in the final round. In the final round, the losing players are tied together, facing each other this time, the player to get both feet out of the ring in two rounds wins.
  - Played by: Ashley M. vs. Nicole vs. Amanda, Cory vs. Nelson vs. Shane
- Knot So Fast: Similar to the original "Knot So Fast" from Battle of the Seasons (2012) and "It Takes Two to Tangle from Battle of the Exes II, players have 20 minutes to create as many knots using 200 feet of rope within a dome-shaped structure. After those 20 minutes are up, players must untie their opponents' knots. The player who unties the opposing players' knots first wins the elimination.
  - Played by: Camila vs. Laurel and CT vs. Darrell

=== Final challenge ===
For the final challenge both teams are dismantled and players compete as individuals. Players pair up with each of the opposite gender competitors during the different stages of the final and their final placement is determined by their total final time. In addition to their share of what is in their team bank account, first place players receive $100,000 each, second receive $15,000 each, and third receive $5,000 each. Players must stay at The Shelter for the duration of the final challenge.

- Stage 1: Pairs must swim from a sand barge to an island and solve a triangle puzzle in order to retrieve a key. They must then use a paddleboard to swim back to the barge to unlock another puzzle. Once the puzzle on the barge has been solved, the pair's times will be stopped.
- Time Buster #1: Pairs will try to extract as much water as they can out of a pile of coconuts and deposit it into their team container. The pair with the most water extracted from their coconuts after an hour has the power to assign a five-minute time penalty to two other players.
- Stage 2: Players are divided into new pairs and race over a mile into the jungle to complete a series of checkpoints. Once they are done, players race back in order to stop their times. Tasks include solving a puzzle, eating disgusting dishes, and walking along a rope.
- Time Buster #2: Pairs must lace Thai prayer beads onto a wire spool for an unrevealed amount of time. Whichever pair has the longest strand laced by the time T.J. Lavin returns is able to add a five-minute penalty to two other players.
- Stage 3: Players are divided into new pairs and follow a series of checkpoints leading to a 10-mile kayak ride. Once a pair has rowed their kayak to the barge, their time is stopped.
- Stage 4: Players compete individually and hang on to a bar suspended from a speedboat until they reach a buoy. Upon reaching the buoy players must swim as fast as they can to the finish line where their individual times are stopped. Players that fall off the bar before reaching the buoy must swim the remaining distance.
  - Winners: CT & Ashley
  - Second place: Nelson & Camila
  - Third place: Cory & Nicole

== Game summary ==
Episode		—N/a	Winners	Elimination contestants		Elimination game	Elimination outcome	
#	Challenge	—N/a	Winners	Last-place	Voted in	Elimination game	Winner	Eliminated
1/2	The Over Under	—N/a	Nicole	Marie	Kailah	In The Trenches	Kailah	Marie
1/2	The Over Under	—N/a	Dario	Bruno	Tony	In The Trenches	Tony	Bruno
	Challenge	—N/a	Winners	Winner's pick	Voted in	Elimination game	Winner	Eliminated
3	Shell Shocked	—N/a	Hunter	Theo	Cory	Who's Got Balls?	Cory	Theo
3	Shell Shocked	—N/a	Ashley M.	Jenna	Anika	Who's Got Balls?	Jenna	Anika
	Challenge	—N/a	Winners	Last-place		Elimination game	Winner	Eliminated
4	Caged and Confused	—N/a	Amanda	LaToya	Sylvia	Thai Rise	Sylvia	LaToya
4	Caged and Confused	—N/a	Shane	Anthony	Nelson	Thai Rise	Nelson	Anthony
	Challenge	Fortress Team	Winners	Player's pick	Voted in	Fortress Game	Winner	Eliminated
5/6	Knockout	Underdogs	Underdogs	Sylvia	Kailah	Tuk Tuk Bang Bang	Sylvia	Kailah
5/6	Knockout	Underdogs	Underdogs	Tony	Shane	Tuk Tuk Bang Bang	Shane	Tony
7	Roll With The Punches	Champions	Champions	Cara Maria	Ashley K.	Pole Wrestle	Cara Maria	Ashley K.
7	Roll With The Punches	Champions	Champions	Zach	Darrell	Pole Wrestle	Darrell	Zach
8	Curry Up	Underdogs	Champions	Nelson	Dario	Bell Ringer	Nelson	Dario
8	Curry Up	Underdogs	Champions	Jenna	Sylvia	Bell Ringer	Jenna	Sylvia
9/10	Fallout	Champions	Underdogs	Bananas vs. Darrell		Balls In	Darrell	Bananas
9/10	Fallout	Champions	Underdogs	Cara Maria vs. Laurel		Balls In	Laurel	Cara Maria
10	Crossover	—N/a	Underdogs	—N/a				
	Challenge	Bloodbath Team	Winners	Fortress contestants		Fortress game	Winner	Eliminated
11/12	X-It	Underdogs	—N/a					Hunter
11/12	X-It	Underdogs	—N/a					Jenna
11/12	X-It	Underdogs	—N/a	Amanda vs. Ashley M. vs. Nicole		Inside Out	Ashley M.	Amanda
11/12	X-It	Underdogs	—N/a	Amanda vs. Ashley M. vs. Nicole		Inside Out	Nicole	Amanda
11/12	X-It	Underdogs	—N/a	Cory vs. Nelson vs. Shane		Inside Out	Nelson	Shane
11/12	X-It	Underdogs	—N/a	Cory vs. Nelson vs. Shane		Inside Out	Cory	Shane
	Challenge	Fortress Team	Winners	Fortress contestants		Fortress game	Winner	Eliminated
12/13	Caved In	Champions	Underdogs	Camila vs. Laurel		Knot So Fast	Camila	Laurel
12/13	Caved In	Champions	Underdogs	CT vs. Darrell		Knot So Fast	CT	Darrell
13/14/15	Final Challenge	—N/a	CT	2nd place: Nelson; 3rd place: Cory				
13/14/15	Final Challenge	—N/a	Ashley M.	2nd place: Camila; 3rd place: Nicole				

=== Elimination progress ===
Contestants	Episodes										
Contestants	1/2	3	4	5/6 (Note: The Champions (Ashley K., Bananas, Camila, Cara Maria, CT, Darrell, Laurel, and Zach) entered the competition at the fourth challenge as a season twist.)	7	8	9/10	10	11/12	12/13	Finale
Ashley M.	SAFE	WIN	EXM	WON	EXM	SAFE	EXM	SAFE	ELIM	EXM	WINNER
CT	—N/a			EXM	SAFE	EXM	WIN	SAFE	EXM	ELIM	WINNER
Camila	—N/a			EXM	SAFE	EXM	WIN	SAFE	EXM	ELIM	SECOND
Nelson	SAFE	SAFE	ELIM	SAFE	EXM	ELIM	EXM	SAFE	ELIM	EXM	SECOND
Cory	SAFE	ELIM	EXM	SAFE	EXM	SAFE	EXM	SAFE	ELIM	EXM	THIRD
Nicole	WIN	EXM	EXM	SAFE	EXM	WIN	EXM	SAFE	ELIM	EXM	THIRD
Darrell	—N/a			EXM	ELIM	EXM	ELIM	SAFE	EXM	OUT	
Laurel	—N/a			EXM	WIN	EXM	ELIM	SAFE	EXM	OUT	
Shane	SAFE	SAFE	WIN	ELIM	EXM	SAFE	EXM	SAFE	OUT		
Amanda	SAFE	SAFE	WIN	SAFE	EXM	SAFE	EXM	SAFE	OUT		
Jenna	SAFE	ELIM	EXM	SAFE	EXM	ELIM	EXM	SAFE	LAST		
Hunter	SAFE	WIN	EXM	SAFE	EXM	WIN	EXM	SAFE	LAST		
Cara Maria	—N/a			EXM	ELIM	EXM	OUT				
Bananas	—N/a			EXM	WIN	EXM	OUT				
Sylvia	SAFE	SAFE	ELIM	ELIM	EXM	OUT					
Dario	WIN	EXM	EXM	WON	EXM	OUT					
Zach	—N/a			EXM	OUT						
Ashley K.	—N/a			EXM	OUT						
Tony	ELIM	EXM	EXM	OUT							
Kailah	ELIM	EXM	EXM	OUT							
Anthony	SAFE	SAFE	OUT								
LaToya	SAFE	SAFE	OUT								
Anika	SAFE	OUT									
Theo	SAFE	QUIT									
Bruno	OUT										
Marie	OUT										

Competition
The contestant won the final challenge
The contestant did not win the final challenge
The contestant won the challenge and won safety from the elimination round
The contestant won the challenge, but was subject to the elimination round
The contestant was exempt from participating in the elimination round
The contestant was not selected for the elimination round
The contestant won in the elimination round
The contestant lost in the elimination round and was eliminated
The contestant came in last in the daily challenge and was eliminated
The contestant withdrew from the elimination round

=== Bank accounts ===
Updated after Episode 12

Champions $25,000	Underdogs $85,000

== Voting progress ==
Voted into Elimination	Tony; 5 of 8 votes	Theo; 1 of 1 vote	Cory; 7 of 7 votes	No vote	Tony; 1 of 1 vote	Shane; 3 of 5 votes	Zach; 1 of 1 vote	Darrell; 2 of 3 votes	Nelson; 1 of 1 votes	Dario; 3 of 4 votes	No vote			
Voted into Elimination	Kailah; 7 of 8 votes	Jenna; 1 of 1 vote	Anika; 7 of 7 votes	No vote	Sylvia; 1 of 1 vote	Kailah; 3 of 5 votes	Cara Maria; 1 of 1 vote	Ashley K. 2 of 3 votes	Jenna; 1 of 1 votes	Sylvia; 4 of 4 votes	No vote			
Voter	Episode													
Voter	1/2	3		4	5/6		7		8		9	10	11	12
Ashley M.	Tony	Theo			Tony					Dario				
CT	—N/a							Camila						
Camila	—N/a							CT						
Nelson	Kailah		Anika			Kailah				Sylvia				
Cory	Kailah		Anika			Ashley M.				Sylvia				
Nicole	Theo		Cory			Shane			Nelson					
Darrell	—N/a							Ashley K.						
Laurel	—N/a						Zach							
Shane	Kailah		Anika			Kailah				Sylvia				
Amanda	Tony		Cory			Cory				Dario				
Jenna	Theo		Cory			Shane				Shane				
Hunter	Kailah	Jenna				Kailah			Jenna					
Cara Maria	—N/a							Darrell						
Bananas	—N/a						Cara Maria							
Sylvia	Tony		Cory			Cory				Dario				
Dario	Kailah		Anika		Sylvia					Sylvia				
Zach	—N/a							Ashley K.						
Ashley K.	—N/a							Darrell						
Tony	Sylvia		Anika			Ashley M.								
Kailah	Theo		Cory			Shane								
Anthony	Kailah		Anika											
LaToya	Tony		Cory											
Anika	Tony		Cory											
Theo	Kailah		Anika											
Bruno														
Marie														

== Teams ==
Shell Shocked (Ep. 3)
Nelson & Amanda
Theo & Anika
Hunter & Ashley M.
Cory & Jenna
Shane & LaToya
Anthony & Sylvia

Roll With The Punches (Ep. 7)
Nelson & Amanda
Bananas & Laurel
Shane & Sylvia
CT & Cara Maria
Hunter & Ashley M.
Darrell & Ashley K.
Dario & Nicole
Zach & Camila
Cory & Jenna
Bananas & Laurel (Note: Since the Champions had two players less than the Underdogs, they had to select a pair (Bananas and Laurel) to compete twice and go against Cory and Jenna (the final underdogs pair).)

Crossover (Ep. 10)
Shane & Nicole
Darrell & Laurel
Nelson & Amanda
Hunter & Ashley M.
CT & Camila
Cory & Jenna

Final Challenge (Ep. 13/14/15)
Stage 1	Stage 2	Stage 3
CT & Camila	CT & Ashley M.	CT & Nicole
Cory & Nicole	Cory & Camila	Cory & Ashley M.
Nelson & Ashley M.	Nelson & Nicole	Nelson & Camila

== Episodes ==
No. overall	No. in season	Title	Original release date	US viewers (millions)
357	1	"Gimmie Shelter"	February 7, 2017	0.69
358	2	"Skeletal Fracture"	February 7, 2017	0.65
359	3	"Helter Shelter"	February 14, 2017	0.65
360	4	"Four Tickets To Paradise"	February 21, 2017	0.76
361	5	"Underdog Eat Underdog World"	February 28, 2017	0.78
362	6	"The Mile-High Club"	March 7, 2017	0.80
363	7	"Achy Breaky Heart"	March 14, 2017	0.86
364	8	"A Low Down Dirty Shane"	March 21, 2017	0.81
365	9	"An Officer and a Gentlewoman"	March 28, 2017	0.82
366	10	"Go Your Own Way"	April 4, 2017	0.76
367	11	"The Bloodbath"	April 11, 2017	0.78
368	12	"Caged"	April 18, 2017	0.79
369	13	"A River of Endless Light"	April 25, 2017	0.76
370	14	"Math Is Hard"	May 2, 2017	0.78
371	15	"The True Champions"	May 9, 2017	0.73

=== Reunion special ===
The reunion special aired on May 16, 2017, one week after the season finale, and was hosted by WWE pro wrestler, The Real World: Back to New York alum, and former Challenge champion Mike "The Miz" Mizanin. Cast members who attended were: CT, Ashley M., Nelson, Camila, Cory, Nicole, Darrell, Laurel, Shane, Amanda, Hunter, Jenna, Johnny Bananas, Cara Maria, Kailah. It had 0.50 million viewers in its first-run airing.
