= Veronica Portillo =

American television personality (born 1977)

Veronica Portillo (born November 27, 1977) is an American reality television personality and the co-creator of the 2000s College Dropout T-shirt line.

== Road Rules ==
=== Semester at Sea ===
She was a student at UC Berkeley when she made her first appearance on MTV on Road Rules on its Semester at Sea season, Portillo gained notoriety for her conflicts and friendships with her fellow roadies as they traveled around the world as part of Semester at Sea. In 2018, part of the cast attended a 20-year reunion cruise, but Portillo did not attend.

=== Viewers' Revenge ===
In 2007, Portillo was invited back to participate in Road Rules: Viewers' Revenge. She was the first castmember nominated to the elimination pit, and subsequently, the first to be sent back to the Pit Crew. On the third week, she was nominated back to the pit, where she lost the challenge "Shuttle Puzzle" to Tori Hall, causing her to go back to the Pit Crew. She had another chance on the eleventh week but ended up losing for a third time. The Pit Crew, including her, won the season's final Pit Stop against the Road Rulers, earning the Pit Crew $20,000 to split amongst the crew.

== Real World/Road Rules Challenge ==
=== Challenge 2000 ===
Portillo was a member of team Road Rules. On this season, she landed on the bullseye in a solo skydiving mission that helped her team secure the final mission prize.

=== Battle of the Seasons ===
Veronica was once again a member of team Road Rules, alongside castmate Yes Duffy. However, their good performance scared the Inner Circle that voted them out first.

=== Battle of the Sexes ===
Veronica improved her performance on this season and conquered a spot in the Inner Circle twice. Despite not having the lowest score, she was voted out in episode ten by the Inner Circle led by Emily Bailey.

=== The Gauntlet ===
In this Challenge, Portillo was very close with teammates Rachel Robinson and Tina Barta. Her team considered sending her in elimination, but she managed to win the Lifeshield twice, securing a spot in the final and ultimately winning her second season.

=== The Inferno ===
Portillo became more of a team leader during this season, winning the LifeSaver four times and being the only girl from the Road Rules team not to face elimination. Tension arose between her and Katie Doyle, since Portillo saw Doyle as the weak link and tried to get rid of her, but in the end, they both competed in the final and won.

=== Battle of the Sexes 2 ===
Portillo was part of the women team. She stepped up once for the role of team captain and was part of the Inner Circle that voted out Cynthia Roberts before being voted off in episode 10.

=== The Inferno II ===
She was part of The Bad Asses team, alongside her allies Rachel Robinson and Tina Barta, and rivals Beth Stolarczyk and Tonya Cooley. Despite making it to the end and winning her first elimination round, her team lost to their opponents, The Good Guys.

=== The Ruins ===
After taking a break from the show, Portillo returned as part of the Champions Team. In the fourth episode after a long verbal battle with teammate Tonya Cooley, Veronica was struck by Cooley, who was struggling with alcoholism and had anger towards Portillo due to Portillo's treatment of Cooley during past seasons including her crafty, cliquish, and antagonistic methods of game play during the show's early seasons. This resulted in Tonya's disqualification from The Ruins. Not experiencing her previous success on the show, Portillo was later eliminated in the sixth episode by KellyAnne Judd from The Real World: Sydney. Her attempts at forming an alliance with Evan Starkman were rejected.

=== Champs vs. Pros ===
Portillo competed on the 2017 miniseries The Challenge: Champs vs. Pros for the charity Planned Parenthood, for which she raised $1,000. However, she was quickly sent in elimination and lost against Ashley Mitchell from Real World: Ex-Plosion.

=== XXX: Dirty 30 ===
Portillo returned to the main show eight years after her prior season to compete in the thirtieth season of The Challenge, where she became friends with Jemmye Carroll. Despite her long break she won an elimination against fellow veteran Aneesa Ferreira and orchestrated Leroy Garrett's elimination before being voted out in episode 14.

=== Vendettas ===
Portillo participated in the next installment of The Challenge, but had to face "mercenary" and former rival Aneesa Ferreira. During their elimination, Veronica dislocated her pinky finger and couldn't continue.

=== Final Reckoning ===
She was partnered with CT, who called her weak on XXX: Dirty 30. Despite the two veterans' legendary legacy, they couldn't work together and were eliminated in episode 5.

=== The Challenge + Universal ===
In 2019, Portillo appeared on a special mini Challenge advertisement for Universal Orlando alongside other champions and hosted by Devyn Simone from The Real World: Brooklyn. She was paired with Darrell Taylor from Road Rules: Campus Crawl and competed against Derrick Kosinski from Road Rules: X-Treme and Emily Schroom from The Real World: D.C., as well as Tori Hall from Road Rules 2007: Viewers' Revenge and Alton Williams from The Real World: Las Vegas. The special aired on May 22, 2019, during the season finale of War of the Worlds.

=== All Stars ===
In April 2022, it was announced that Portillo would appear on the third season of The Challenge: All Stars. She was medically disqualified in episode 8 after breaking her toes.

She later appeared on the fourth season of The Challenge: All Stars in 2024, where she was eliminated during the final challenge.

She would appear again on the fifth season, The Challenge All Stars: Rivals, where she was partnered with Katie due to the events of The Inferno, and they were eliminated in episode 9.

=== Ride or Dies ===
Portillo appeared alongside Darrell in Ride or Dies, after joining the game late in the fourth episode. They were eliminated in episode 7.

== Personal life ==
Portillo grew up in Irvine, California. In 2012 Portillo announced her pregnancy on social media, but it ended in a stillbirth of her daughter in 2013.

On XXX: Dirty 30, Aneesa Ferreira (The Real World: Chicago alumna) revealed that Portillo and Rachel Robinson (Road Rules: Campus Crawl alumna and co-creator of the College Dropout T-shirt line) dated for three years after Ferreira and Robinson broke up. The two first met on Battle of the Sexes.

== Modeling ==
Portillo appeared in the May 2002 issue of Playboy, Real Nude in the Real World alongside Beth Stolarczyk from The Real World: Los Angeles, Flora Alekseyeun from The Real World: Miami, and Jisela Delgado from Road Rules: The Quest.

== Filmography ==
=== Television ===
Year	Title	Role	Notes
1999	Road Rules: Semester at Sea	Herself	19 episodes
2000	Real World/Road Rules Challenge 2000	Contestant	Winner (11 episodes)
2002	Real World/Road Rules Challenge: Battle of the Seasons	Contestant	Eliminated; 15th place (1 episode)
2003	Real World/Road Rules Challenge: Battle of the Sexes	Contestant	Eliminated; 9th place (12 episodes)
2003-2004	Real World/Road Rules Challenge: The Gauntlet	Contestant	Winner (16 episodes)
2004	Real World/Road Rules Challenge: The Inferno	Contestant	Winner (19 episodes)
2004	Real World/Road Rules Challenge: Battle of the Sexes 2	Contestant	Eliminated; 9th place (11 episodes)
2005	Real World/Road Rules Challenge: The Inferno II	Contestant	Runner-up (16 episodes)
2007	Road Rules: Viewers' Revenge	Herself	15 episodes
2009	Real World/Road Rules Challenge: The Ruins	Contestant	Eliminated; 8th place (6 episodes)
2017	The Challenge: Champs vs. Pros	Contestant	Eliminated (1 episode)
2017	The Challenge XXX: Dirty 30	Contestant	Eliminated; 7th place (14 episodes)
2018	The Challenge: Vendettas	Contestant	Eliminated; 10th place (8 episodes)
2018	The Challenge: Final Reckoning	Contestant	Eliminated; 14th place (5 episodes)
2022	The Challenge: All Stars (season 3)	Contestant	Medically disqualified; 5th place (8 episodes)
2022	The Challenge: Ride or Dies	Contestant	Eliminated; 10th place (4 episodes)
2024	The Challenge: All Stars (season 4)	Contestant	Fifth place (12 episodes)
2025	The Challenge All Stars: Rivals	Contestant	Eliminated; 6th place (9 episodes)
