= Road Rules: Semester at Sea =

- Season 8
- The cast of Road Rules: Semester at Sea
- Starring: Ayanna Mackins; Pawel Litwinski; Pua Medeiros; Shawn Sealy; Veronica Portillo; Yes Duffy
- No. of episodes: 19 (including two specials)

Release
- Original network: MTV
- Original release: June 8 – October 11, 1999

Season chronology
- ← Previous; Road Rules: Latin America Next → Road Rules: Maximum Velocity Tour

Road Rules: Semester at Sea is the eighth season of the MTV reality television series Road Rules. This season featured six cast members in the shipboard Semester at Sea study program, and followed the cast as they travelled aboard a cruise ship, both while taking school classes and embarking on the various adventures and scavenger hunts typical of Road Rules. This is considered to be the final season of the 'classic era' of Road Rules, as the format of the show would change significantly beginning with Road Rules: Maximum Velocity Tour. This season was filmed in: Nassau (Bahamas), Havana (Cuba), Salvador (Brazil), Cape Town (South Africa), Mombasa and Chyulu Hills (Kenya), Madras (India), Penang (Malaysia), Ho Chi Minh City (Vietnam), Hong Kong (Hong Kong), Shanghai (China), Osaka and Tokyo (Japan), and Seattle (Washington).

A pair of specials — a casting special and a "Passport to Road Rules 8: Semester at Sea" special, aired on June 8 and June 14, 1999, respectively, and the season premiered on June 21, 1999.

== Cast ==
Cast member	Age^{1}	Hometown
Ayanna Mackins	20	Media, PA
Pawel Litwinski	21	Brooklyn, NY
Pua Medeiros	19	Hilo, HI
Shawn Sealy	19	Boston, MA
Veronica Portillo	21	Tustin Ranch, CA
Yes Duffy	19	Berkeley, CA

- ^Note 1: Age at time of filming.

== Missions ==
#	Mission	Result	Notes
1	Sky Dive Onto A Desert Island	Completed	
2	Make Your Way To Civilizations	Completed	
3	Softball	Completed	
4	Picolino Circus Performance	Completed	The cast are able to give an iMac G3 for street kids
5	Live with South African Families	Completed	At the end of this mission the cast do a presentation of Apartheid on the ship
6	Photo Safari	Completed	
7	Install Solar Energy in Dalit Village	Completed	
8	Job at Matang Wildlife Centre	Completed	
9	"A Day in the Life of Vietnam" Race	Completed	
10	Ho Chi Minh Millions	Completed	
11	Dragon Boat Race	Completed	
12	Perform in Chinese Opera	Completed	The first half of this episode marred by anti-American Protest took place in Shanghai following the United States bombing of the Chinese embassy in Belgrade
13	Anime	Completed	
14	Skidome challenge	Completed	
15	Salon at Sea	Completed	

== Episodes ==
No. overall	No. in season	Title	Original release date
103	1	"All Aboard"	June 21, 1999
104	2	"Running Off With the Circus"	June 28, 1999
105	3	"Answering to the School Bell"	July 5, 1999
106	4	"A Coming Home"	July 12, 1999
107	5	"A Coming Home (2)"	July 19, 1999
108	6	"Pawel's Kenyan Experience"	July 26, 1999
109	7	"Hot Voodoo"	August 2, 1999
110	8	"Pulling Together"	August 9, 1999
111	9	"Paint or Pay"	August 16, 1999
112	10	"Just Say Yes"	August 23, 1999
113	11	"Good Morning Vietnam"	August 30, 1999
114	12	"Ho Chih Minh's Millions"	September 6, 1999
115	13	"Growing and Rowing"	September 13, 1999
116	14	"Shaghai Surprise"	September 20, 1999
117	15	"The Perils of Pua"	September 27, 1999
118	16	"Accusations"	October 4, 1999
119	17	"10 Days"	October 11, 1999

== After filming ==
Veronica appeared nude in the May 2002 issue of Playboy magazine, along with other alumni of The Real World and Road Rules: Flora Alekseyeun, Beth Stolarczyk and Jisela Delgado. In 2007, she returned to the series as part of the alumni cast of Road Rules 2007: Viewers' Revenge.

In 2007, Ayanna welcomed her first daughter, Madison.

Yes is currently an architect and fabricator and works at University of California, Berkeley.

In 2018, the cast reunited for a 20-year reunion cruise. Ayanna Mackins, Pua Medeiros, Yes Duffy and Shawn Sealy attended the reunion.

=== The Challenge ===
Cast member	Seasons of The Challenge	Other appearances
Ayanna Mackins	Extreme Challenge, Battle of the Sexes, Battle of the Sexes 2	The Challenge: All Stars (season 2), The Challenge: All Stars (season 4)
Pawel Litwinski	—N/a	—N/a
Pua Medeiros	—N/a	—N/a
Shawn Sealy	Battle of the Sexes 2	—N/a
Veronica Portillo	Challenge 2000, Battle of the Seasons (2002), Battle of the Sexes, The Gauntlet, The Inferno, Battle of the Sexes 2, The Inferno II, The Ruins, XXX: Dirty 30, Vendettas, Final Reckoning, Ride or Dies	The Challenge: Champs vs. Pros, The Challenge: All Stars (season 3), The Challenge: All Stars (season 4), The Challenge: All Stars (season 5)
Yes Duffy	Challenge 2000, Battle of the Seasons (2002), Battle of the Sexes	The Challenge: All Stars (season 1), The Challenge: All Stars (season 3), The Challenge: World Championship
