= The Challenge: All Stars season 4 =

The Challenge: All Stars
- Season 4
- Presented by: T. J. Lavin
- No. of contestants: 25
- Winner: Laurel Stucky
- Location: Cape Town, South Africa
- No. of episodes: 12

Release
- Original network: Paramount+
- Original release: April 10 – June 19, 2024

Season chronology
- ← Previous; Season 3 Next → Season 5

The fourth season of The Challenge: All Stars premiered on Paramount+ on April 10, 2024. The season features twenty-five cast members from The Real World, Road Rules, The Challenge, and Are You the One? competing for $300,000.

== Format ==
The fourth season of The Challenge: All Stars features a daily challenge, a nomination process and an elimination round.

- Daily Challenge: Players compete in a challenge individually or in teams. The winners are immune from elimination while a certain number of last-place players or teams form the "losing group" and become at risk of being voted into the elimination round.
- Nomination process: Players who did not win or place last in the daily challenge (collectively the "middle group") vote between players of the designated gender from the losing group to complete in the elimination round. The two players who receive the most votes are nominated.
- Eliminations (The Arena): At the Arena, the daily challenge winners are given the choice to volunteer for the elimination to try and win/steal a Star. If a winner volunteers, they must choose one of the two nominated players to replace for the elimination. If the winners decline, the two nominated players compete in the elimination round. The winner of the elimination remains in the game while the defeated player is eliminated.

Twists

- Stars: To be eligible to compete in the Final Challenge, players must possess a Star, with only three Stars originally available for each gender. The Stars were initially awarded to the top three players of each gender from the "Reach for the Stars" challenge. The winners of elimination rounds can steal a Star for themself if they do not possess one. If elimination winners already possess a Star, they must steal a Star and award it to another player of the same gender they stole from. The winners of daily challenges are immune from having their Star stolen.
  - Purge challenge: Before the Final Challenge, two additional Stars were introduced in episode 11. Players who did not possess a Star at the time compete in the "Star Born" challenge where the winning male and female player earned the final Stars and joined the other six Star holders in the Final Challenge, while all losing players were eliminated.
- Double Elimination: Episodes 3 and 6 featured a double elimination where one male and one female player were eliminated.

== Contestants ==
Male contestants	Original season	Finish
Steve Meinke	Road Rules: The Quest	Third place
Ace Amerson	The Real World: Paris	Fourth place
Leroy Garrett	The Real World: Las Vegas (2011)	Seventh place
Derek Chavez	The Real World: Cancun	Eighth place
Adam Larson	Road Rules: The Quest	Episode 11
Ryan Kehoe	Real World/Road Rules Challenge: Fresh Meat	Episode 11
Jay Mitchell	Real World: Ex-Plosion	Episode 10
Brad Fiorenza	The Real World: San Diego (2004)	Episode 7
Kefla Hare	Road Rules: Down Under	Episode 6
Brandon Nelson	The Challenge: Fresh Meat II	Episode 5
Syrus Yarbrough (Note: Prior to the "Domino Motherf*****!" challenge in episode 3, Tony withdrew from the competition due to family matters back at home. Syrus entered the competition as a replacement for Tony.)	The Real World: Boston	Episode 3
Tony Raines	Real World: Skeletons	Episode 3
Tyri Ballard-Brown	The Real World: Denver	Episode 1

Female contestants	Original season	Finish
Laurel Stucky	The Challenge: Fresh Meat II	Winner
Cara Maria Sorbello	The Challenge: Fresh Meat II	Runner-up
Nicole Zanatta	Real World: Skeletons	Fifth place
Veronica Portillo	Road Rules: Semester at Sea	Fifth place
Averey Tressler	The Real World: Portland	Episode 11
Flora Alekseyeun	The Real World: Miami	Episode 11 (Note: Prior to the "Star Born" challenge in episode 11, Flora withdrew from the competition after physically feeling unable to continue in the competition.)
Kam Williams	Are You the One? 5	Episode 9
Tina Barta	Road Rules: South Pacific	Episode 8
Jasmine Reynaud	The Real World: Cancun	Episode 6
Rachel Robinson	Road Rules: Campus Crawl	Episode 4
Ayanna Mackins	Road Rules: Semester at Sea	Episode 3
Janelle Casanave	The Real World: Key West	Episode 2 (Note: After the episode 2 nominations, Janelle withdrew from the competition in the interest of her mental health, following various arguments in the preceding days. As Janelle was nominated to compete against Tina in the Arena, and no challenge winners volunteered to compete, the "Cheat Codes" elimination was cancelled and Tina was automatically awarded the ability to steal a Star.)

== Gameplay ==
=== Challenge games ===
- Reach for the Stars: Each player has eight boxes with varying star-shaped pegs on them. They must collect star-shaped puzzle pieces from the bottom of a hill, one at a time, and fit them onto the corresponding pegs. The first male and female player to fit all eight puzzle pieces and raise their flag at the top of the hill wins, with the top three players of each genders receiving Stars. The last four players of each gender to finish form the losing group.
  - Winners: Brad & Cara Maria
- Car Sick: Played in five teams of four and one team of three. One team at a time begins inside a van suspended above ground, which spins as it descends. Teams must listen to the van's radio for ads mentioning certain numbers and locations. Once the van reaches the ground, teams must find suitcases on the van marked with the locations mentioned and use the corresponding numbers to solve math equations to reveal the codes to unlock the suitcases. Once teams unlock all their suitcases, they must use the puzzle pieces inside to solve a puzzle. The team with the fastest time wins while the two teams with the slowest times form the losing group.
  - Winners: Jay, Laurel, Nicole & Tony
- Domino Motherf*****!: Played in male-female teams of two. Teams must line up ten large domino pieces from their rack (which includes decoy pieces) to or from a starting domino at the middle of a field such that each the connecting ends of each domino have the same number of stars. The first team to finish wins while the last five teams to finish form the losing group.
  - Winners: Adam & Averey
- Unbraided: Reloaded: Played in four teams of five, with two teams competing at a time. Teams begin suspended off the side of a speeding truck, with each team member hanging from one of five ropes that form a braid. Teams must unravel the ropes then work together to maneuver a peg through a maze on the side of the truck. The team with the fastest time wins while the two teams with the slowest times form the losing group.
  - Winners: Derek, Kam, Laurel, Ryan & Steve
- Bobblehead Bobsled: Played in three teams of five and one team of four, with one team competing at a time. At the start of the challenge, host T.J. Lavin opens a valve connected to a cylinder so that the water inside slowly drains. While wearing "bobbleheads", teams must run uphill to a bobsled track, ride down and shut the valve to retain as much water as possible and stop their time. Hanging along the track are also bags of water which teams can collect to replenish their cylinder. The team with the most water in their cylinder relative to their overall time wins, while the two teams with the least water relative to their time form the losing group.
  - Winners: Derek, Kam, Kefla, Steve & Tina
- Take a Seat: Played in male/female pairs, the challenge contains two phases. In Phase One, played across five rounds, host T.J. Lavin announces a series of seat numbers within the Athlone Stadium, and teams race to sit themselves in those seats. With one less seat available than players remaining for each round, the team that is unable to seat both members are eliminated from the phase. The last four teams standing receive a 30-second advantage in Phase Two. In Phase Two, teams must search the stands for a token, exchange the token for a bag of hooks, then use the hooks to connect weighted blocks into two sections of equal weight. The first team to finish wins while the last five teams form the losing group.
  - Winners: Ace & Nicole
- Face the Facts: Played in male/female pairs, with four teams competing at a time. Each round, teams begin on a platform above water and are asked trivia questions one at a time. Each time a team answers incorrectly, a ball is added to their team cylinder, and teams are pulled into the water and eliminated from the challenge once they incur three balls. The last two teams standing in each round advance to the winner's round where this process is repeated to determine the winners of the challenge. The first two teams eliminated in each round form the losing group.
  - Winners: Leroy & Veronica
- Balls Up: In the first round, played in two heats, players enter a mudpit below a net containing five colored balls for each player. They must use a plunger to push their opponent's balls out of the net while their opponents try to do the same. Players are eliminated from the challenge once all their balls are out of the net, although they can continue pushing out other player's balls. The first two male and female players eliminated from each heat form the losing group, while the remaining players advance to the final round. In the final round, players repeat this process, where the last male and female player standing wins.
  - Winners: Ace & Averey
- Run the Plank: Played in male/female pairs across two heats. Team members alternate turns making their way up a plank, jumping off the end and attempting to pull down a hanging ball as they fall into the water. Each time teams pull the ball down, their team's maze lowers slightly, and teams continue this process until their maze fully descends to the water below. Once complete, teams must then maneuver two stars out of the maze and place them at a board onshore. The team with the fastest time wins while the four teams with the slowest times, including teams that are disqualified if a team member refuses to jump, form the losing group.
  - Winners: Derek & Laurel
- Roll With It: Each player begins in a shopping cart at one end of a track and must cross the track in the cart to collect a star at the other end. Players can cross by lassoing a series of poles to pull themselves along, or by pushing themselves off the poles directly. The first male and female player to collect a star wins while the last three male and female players form the losing group.
  - Winners: Jay & Laurel
- Star Born: In a special challenge, players who currently do not possess a Star compete to earn one of the two newly introduced Stars. Players race to untie a hanging raft from a tree before paddling the raft to a platform in the water. At the platform, they must dive underneath to untie a key before using the key to unlock a trough of mud onshore and search the trough for a Star. The first male and female player to find a Star wins and claim the final two spots in the Final Challenge while the remaining players are eliminated.
  - Winners: Derek & Laurel
  - Eliminated: Adam, Averey & Ryan

=== Arena games ===
- Catch a Falling Star: Players must search a pit filled with hundreds of balls for 12 with stars on them, and deposit them in their tube one at a time. The first player to finish wins.
  - Played by: Steve vs. Tyri
- Down the Tube: Players begin in opposite sides of a tube with a large ball in between them, and attempt to push their ball out their opponent's side of the tube while their opponent tries to do the same. The first player to push the ball out their opponent's side of the tube twice wins.
  - Played by: Ayanna vs. Rachel and Kefla vs. Syrus
- Star Slice: Players take turns aiming throwing stars at a wall of targets, attempting to hit targets of their opponent's face three times. If a player hits a target of their own face, it is counted as a hit for their opponent. On the wall are also targets which apply advantages or disadvantages if they are hit. The first player to hit their required targets three times wins.
  - Played by: Cara Maria vs. Rachel
- Mission Improbable: Players begin suspended above the Arena with their arms and legs connected to a maze. They must maneuver five balls into holes at the center of the maze. The first player to land all five balls wins.
  - Played by: Brandon vs. Leroy
- Rope Rumble: In the middle of the Arena is a long and heavy rope which players must fully push, pull or move onto their opponent's half of the Arena while their opponent tries to do the same. The first player to achieve this wins.
  - Played by: Jasmine vs. Nicole and Kefla vs. Steve
- Cheat Codes: Each player has a giant "video game controller" and a screen on the opposite side of the Arena. Players must press a button on the screen to reveal a "cheat code" which they must replicate by pressing buttons of their controller using their feet. The first player to correctly replicate the code wins.
  - Played by: Adam vs. Brad
- Ladies and the Tramp: Players must bounce on a trampoline to view and memorize an answer key behind a tall wall, and recreate the key using tiles at their board. The first player to correctly replicate the key wins.
  - Played by: Kam vs. Tina
- Caged In: Players enter a mudpit underneath a mesh cage containing ten balls. They must use their fingers to push all ten balls out a hole end of the cage and place the balls in their basket at the end of the pit. The first player to finish wins.
  - Played by: Cara Maria vs. Kam
- Shish Kestack: Players must enter a water tank, collect colored puzzle pieces from the bottom one at a time, and stack them on their respective poles outside the tank from the lightest to darkest shades. The first player to complete all three stacks wins.
  - Played by: Jay vs. Steve

=== Final Challenge ===
Day one

The eight Star holders compete in the Final Challenge. For day one, players compete in an alternating series of "Advantage" and "Elimination" checkpoints. At Advantage checkpoints, the winner(s) earn(s) an advantage for the subsequent Elimination checkpoint; the last-place player(s) at each Elimination checkpoint is eliminated, with this process continuing until only four players remain by the end of the day. Additionally, players eliminated during day one are also given the ability to give their Star to another finalist, which awards that player an advantage during day two.

Checkpoints

- Shooting Star (Advantage): Players begin strapped to the roof of a racecar, equipped with a paintball gun and 100 paintballs. As the racecar speeds around a complex, players must use the paintball gun to hit a series of targets. Each target hit is worth one point, except for one hidden target worth two points. The player with the most points wins.
  - Winner: Leroy
- Electric Star (Elimination): Players must maneuver a ring through a wire loop game, and are shocked each time their ring touches the wire. The winning player from the last checkpoint is allowed skip the starting quarter of the loop. The player with the slowest time is eliminated from the Final Challenge.
  - Eliminated: Derek (eighth place)
- Spicy Foot (Advantage): Players must eat ten peppers off a hanging string connected to a pulley system, which they can lower by raising their foot. The first player to consume all ten peppers wins.
  - Winner: Nicole
- Balance for Survival (Elimination): Players must place cups of liquid into a holder connected to ropes, then use ropes to maneuver the holder to their mouth so that they can suck and spit the liquid into a tube. Players continue this process until they collect enough liquid to reach a line marked on the tube. The winning player from the previous checkpoint has the line on their tube lowered. The last player to finish is eliminated from the Final Challenge.
  - Eliminated: Leroy (seventh place)
- Hoseball (Advantage): Played in self-selected teams of two. Teams must spray a firehose at a ball so that it rolls into their team's goal at one end of a triangle while both their opponents try to do the same. The first team to score two goals wins.
  - Winners: Ace & Cara Maria
- Bluff Night (Elimination) and Overnight Stage: One at a time, players select a challenge in one of three rooms and attempt to complete that challenge as fast as possible. The winning team from the last checkpoint is given the power to select one team member to go first. This player then selects the next player to compete, with this selection process repeating until everyone has competed. Additionally, only two players can complete each room's challenge, determined on a first-come first-served basis. The two players with the slowest times are eliminated from the Final Challenge. Afterwards, players must spend the night on a hanging cargo net.
  - Room #1 (Nailed It): Players must hammer three long nails into a log.
  - Room #2 (Marble Blast): Players must roll a ball through a hole at the end of a ramp, and must collect the ball and restart after every miss.
  - Room #3 (Firearm): While wearing a glove set on fire, players must use the glove to ignite four targets before throwing kerosene-soaked balls at the targets until four balls are ignited.
  - Eliminated: Nicole, Veronica (fifth place)

Day two

Final Leg: Players must ride a scooter to a "Star Loop" containing five checkpoints. Players must complete five laps of the Star Loop which requires them to complete one checkpoint on the first lap, two checkpoints on the second lap, and so on, culminating with all five checkpoints on the fifth lap. For each Star a player currently possesses, they can use each one to skip a checkpoint, but can only use one Star per lap. After completing all five laps, players then run to collect one of three "Star Handles" before proceeding to the finish line, with the fourth player left without a Star Handle eliminated from the Final Challenge. The first player to cross the finish line is declared the winner of All Stars 4 and wins $250,000, with second and third place earning $25,000 each.

Checkpoints

- Drink It: Players can either eat a cockroach or take a shot of fermented liquid.
- Connect It: Players must complete a pipe puzzle requiring them to use puzzle pieces to form a path between two ends of a pipe.
- Rock It: Players must find ten stones in a tub of mealworms then stack the stones and have them stand for ten seconds.
- Build It: Players must assemble a vertical puzzle.
- Swing It: While harnessed, players must swing themselves to place two rings around a hook mounted to a tall wall.

Final results

- Winner: Laurel ($250,000)
- Runner-up: Cara Maria ($25,000)
- Third place: Steve ($25,000)
- Fourth place: Ace (eliminated)

== Game summary ==
Episode		Gender	Challenge type	Winners	Arena contestants			Arena game	Arena outcome			
#	Challenge	Gender	Challenge type	Winners	Voted in		Volunteer	Arena game	Winner	Eliminated	Star stolen	Star given
1	Reach for the Stars	Male	Individual	Cara Maria	Steve	Tyri	—N/a	Catch a Falling Star	Steve	Tyri	Brandon	—N/a
1	Reach for the Stars	Male	Individual	Brad	Steve	Tyri	—N/a	Catch a Falling Star	Steve	Tyri	Brandon	—N/a
2	Car Sick	Female	5 teams of 4 & 1 team of 3	Yellow Team	Janelle	Tina	—N/a	Cheat Codes	Tina	—N/a	Averey	—N/a
3	Domino Motherf*****!	Male	Male/Female pairs	Adam & Averey	Kefla	Syrus	—N/a	Down the Tube	Kefla	Syrus	Brad	—N/a
3	Domino Motherf*****!	Female	Male/Female pairs	Adam & Averey	Ayanna	Rachel	—N/a	Down the Tube	Rachel	Ayanna	Tina	Veronica
4	Unbraided: Reloaded	Female	4 teams of 5	Pink Team	Cara Maria	Rachel	—N/a	Star Slice	Cara Maria	Rachel	Rachel	Jasmine
5	Bobblehead Bobsled	Male	3 teams of 5 & 1 team of 4	Orange Team	Brandon	Leroy	—N/a	Mission Improbable	Leroy	Brandon	Adam	—N/a
6	Take a Seat	Male	Male/Female pairs	Ace & Nicole	Kefla	Steve	—N/a	Rope Rumble	Steve	Kefla	Kefla	Ace
6	Take a Seat	Female	Male/Female pairs	Ace & Nicole	Jasmine	~~Veronica~~	Nicole	Rope Rumble	Nicole	Jasmine	Jasmine	—N/a
7	Face the Facts	Male	Male/Female pairs	Leroy & Veronica	Adam	Brad	—N/a	Cheat Codes	Adam	Brad	Ace	—N/a
8	Balls Up	Female	Individual	Ace	Kam	Tina	—N/a	Ladies and the Tramp	Kam	Tina	Cara Maria	—N/a
8	Balls Up	Female	Individual	Averey	Kam	Tina	—N/a	Ladies and the Tramp	Kam	Tina	Cara Maria	—N/a
9	Run the Plank	Female	Male/Female pairs	Derek & Laurel	Cara Maria	Kam	—N/a	Caged In	Cara Maria	Kam	Kam	—N/a
10	Roll With It	Male	Individual	Jay	~~Leroy~~	Steve	Jay	Shish Kestack	Steve	Jay	Adam	Ace
10	Roll With It	Male	Individual	Laurel	~~Leroy~~	Steve	Jay	Shish Kestack	Steve	Jay	Adam	Ace
11	Star Born	—N/a	Individual	Derek	—N/a					Adam	—N/a	
11	Star Born	—N/a	Individual	Derek	—N/a					Ryan	—N/a	
11	Star Born	—N/a	Individual	Laurel	—N/a					Averey	—N/a	
11/12	Final Challenge	—N/a	Individual	Laurel	2nd: Cara Maria; 3rd: Steve; 4th: Ace; 5th: Nicole and Veronica; 7th: Leroy; 8th: Derek							

=== Episode progress ===
Contestants	Episodes											
Contestants	1	2	3	4	5	6	7	8	9	10	11	Finale
Laurel	SAFE	WIN	SAFE	WIN	LOSE	RISK	LOSE	SAFE	WIN	WIN	STAR	WINNER
Cara Maria	WIN	SAFE	SAFE	ELIM	SAFE	SAFE	SAFE	SAFE	ELIM	SAFE	N/A	SECOND
Steve	ELIM	LOSE	SAFE	WIN	WIN	ELIM	RISK	LOSE	LOSE	ELIM	N/A	THIRD
Ace	SAFE	SAFE	SAFE	LOSE	SAFE	WIN	SAFE	WIN	LOSE	SAFE	N/A	FOURTH
Nicole	SAFE	WIN	SAFE	RISK	LOSE	WON	SAFE	SAFE	SAFE	SAFE	N/A	FIFTH
Veronica	LOSE	SAFE	RISK	RISK	SAFE	SAVE	WIN	RISK	RISK	LOSE	N/A	FIFTH
Leroy	RISK	SAFE	RISK	LOSE	ELIM	RISK	WIN	SAFE	LOSE	SAVE	N/A	SEVENTH
Derek	RISK	LOSE	RISK	WIN	WIN	RISK	SAFE	LOSE	WIN	SAFE	STAR	EIGHTH
Adam	STAR	LOSE	WIN	LOSE	SAFE	SAFE	ELIM	SAFE	SAFE	SAFE	LAST	
Averey	STAR	SAFE	WIN	SAFE	LOSE	SAFE	LOSE	WIN	SAFE	LOSE	LAST	
Ryan	SAFE	LOSE	SAFE	WIN	RISK	SAFE	RISK	LOSE	LOSE	RISK	LAST	
Flora	LOSE	SAFE	RISK	RISK	LOSE	SAFE	LOSE	RISK	RISK	LOSE	QUIT	
Jay	SAFE	WIN	SAFE	SAFE	SAFE	SAFE	SAFE	LOSE	SAFE	LOSS		
Kam	SAFE	SAFE	SAFE	WIN	WIN	RISK	LOSE	ELIM	OUT			
Tina	LOSE	SAVE	RISK	SAFE	WIN	RISK	SAFE	OUT				
Brad	WIN	SAFE	RISK	LOSE	RISK	RISK	OUT					
Jasmine	LOSE	RISK	SAFE	SAFE	LOSE	OUT						
Kefla	SAFE	SAFE	ELIM	LOSE	WIN	OUT						
Brandon	STAR	SAFE	SAFE	SAFE	OUT							
Rachel	STAR	SAFE	ELIM	OUT								
Ayanna	SAFE	SAFE	OUT									
Syrus	—N/a		OUT									
Tony	SAFE	WIN	QUIT									
Janelle	SAFE	QUIT										
Tyri	OUT											

Competition key
The contestant won the Final Challenge
The contestant did not win the Final Challenge
The contestant was eliminated during the Final Challenge
The contestant won the daily challenge and was immune from having their Star stolen
The contestant earned a Star in the daily challenge
The contestant was safe from the Arena
The contestant came in last-place in the daily challenge, but was not nominated for the Arena
The contestant came in last-place in the daily challenge, but was not eligible to be nominated for the Arena
The contestant was nominated for the Arena and won, and earned the right to steal a Star
The contestant was nominated for the Arena, but did not have to compete
The contestant won the daily challenge, volunteered for the Arena, won and earned the right to steal a star
The contestant lost in the Arena and was eliminated
The contestant withdrew from the competition
The contestant won the daily challenge, volunteered for the Arena, lost and was eliminated
The contestant placed last in the challenge and was eliminated
N/A The contestant did not compete in the challenge as they already possessed a Star

=== Star progress ===
Gender	Star	Episodes											
Gender	Star	1	2	3	4	5	6	7	8	9	10	11	12
Female	1	Cara Maria								Kam	Cara Maria		
Male	2	Brad			Kefla			Ace	Adam			Ace	
Male	3	Brandon	Steve										
Male	4	Adam					Leroy						
Female	5	Averey		Tina	Veronica								
Female	6	Rachel				Jasmine		Nicole					
Male	7												Derek
Female	8												Laurel

Star holder at the start of each episode.

== Voting progress ==
Voted In	Steve; 13 of 14 votes	Janelle; 11 of 12 votes	Kefla; 10 of 10 votes	Ayanna; 10 of 10 votes	Cara Maria; 4 of 5 votes	Brandon; 4 of 5 votes	Kefla; 6 of 6 votes	Jasmine; 3 of 6 votes	Adam; 6 of 6 votes	Kam ? of 5 votes	Cara Maria; 4 of 4 votes	Steve; 4 of 5 votes
Voted In	Tyri; 12 of 14 votes	Tina; 7 of 12 votes	Syrus; 10 of 10 votes	Rachel; 5 of 10 votes	Rachel; 4 of 5 votes	Leroy; 5 of 5 votes	Steve; 3 of 6 votes	~~Veronica~~; ~~3 of 6 votes~~	Brad; 3 of 6 votes	Tina ? of 5 votes	Kam; 4 of 4 votes	~~Leroy~~; ~~4 of 5 votes~~
Volunteer	—N/a							Nicole	—N/a			Jay
Voter	Episodes											
Voter	1 (Note: During episode 6, it was confirmed by Ace that Steve received 13 of 14 votes during the episode 1 nominations. It is unknown how many votes Tyri received other than the two confirmed votes shown during the same episode.)	2	3		4	5	6		7	8	9	10
Laurel	Steve; Tyri		Kefla; Syrus	Ayanna; Tina						Kam; Tina		
Cara Maria		Janelle; Tina	Kefla; Syrus	Ayanna; Flora		Brandon; Leroy	Kefla; Leroy	Jasmine; Veronica	Adam; Brad	Not shown		Leroy; Ryan
Steve			Kefla; Syrus	Ayanna; Flora								
Ace	Derek; Leroy	Not shown	Kefla; Syrus	Ayanna; Veronica		Brandon; Leroy			Adam; Brad			Leroy; Steve
Nicole	Steve; Tyri		Kefla; Syrus	Ayanna; Rachel				Veronica to replace	Adam; Ryan	Kam; Tina	Cara Maria; Kam	Ryan; Steve
Veronica		Janelle; Jasmine				Brandon; Leroy						
Leroy		Janelle; Tina								Kam; Tina		
Derek									Adam; Brad			Leroy; Steve
Adam	Steve; Tyri					Brandon; Leroy	Kefla; Leroy	Jasmine; Laurel		Not shown	Cara Maria; Kam	Leroy; Steve
Averey	Steve; Tyri	Janelle; Tina			Cara Maria; Veronica		Brad; Kefla	Not shown Veronica			Cara Maria; Kam	
Ryan	Steve; Tyri		Kefla; Syrus	Ayanna; Flora			Kefla; Steve	Kam; Tina				
Flora		Janelle; Tina					Kefla; Steve	Kam; Tina				
Jay	Steve; Tyri		Kefla; Syrus	Ayanna; Rachel	Flora; Rachel	Leroy; Ryan	Kefla; Steve	Jasmine; Veronica	Adam; Ryan		Cara Maria; Kam	Leroy to replace
Kam	Steve; Tyri	Janelle; Tina	Kefla; Syrus	Ayanna; Rachel								
Tina					Cara Maria; Rachel				Adam; Steve			
Brad		Janelle; Jasmine										
Jasmine			Kefla; Syrus	Ayanna; Rachel	Cara Maria; Rachel							
Kefla	Steve; Tyri	Janelle; Tina										
Brandon	Derek; Steve	Janelle; Tina	Kefla; Syrus	Ayanna; Rachel	Cara Maria; Rachel							
Rachel	Steve; Tyri	Janelle; Jasmine										
Ayanna	Steve; Tyri	Janelle; Jasmine										
Syrus												
Tony	Steve; Tyri											
Janelle	Steve; Tyri											
Tyri												

== Team selections ==
Contestants	Episodes													
Contestants	1	2	3	4	5	6	7	8	9	10	11	11/12		
Laurel	Individual	Yellow	Brandon	Pink	Dark Blue	Brad	Ryan	Individual	Derek	Individual	Individual	Individual	Nicole	Individual
Cara Maria	Individual	Green	Ace	Orange	Red	Jay	Ace	Individual	Ace	Individual	N/A	Individual	Ace	Individual
Steve	Individual	Peach	Jasmine	Pink	Orange	Veronica	Kam	Individual	Flora	Individual	N/A	Individual	Veronica	Individual
Ace	Individual	Green	Cara Maria	Orange	Red	Nicole	Cara Maria	Individual	Cara Maria	Individual	N/A	Individual	Cara Maria	Individual
Nicole	Individual	Yellow	Jay	Green	Light Blue	Ace	Jay	Individual	Jay	Individual	N/A	Individual	Laurel	
Veronica	Individual	Orange	Derek	Orange	Red	Steve	Leroy	Individual	Ryan	Individual	N/A	Individual	Steve	
Leroy	Individual	Orange	Flora	Green	Light Blue	Kam	Veronica	Individual	Kam	Individual	N/A	Individual		
Derek	Individual	Blue	Veronica	Pink	Orange	Jasmine	Tina	Individual	Laurel	Individual	Individual	Individual		
Adam	Individual	Peach	Averey	Green	Red	Flora	Averey	Individual	Averey	Individual	Individual			
Averey	Individual	Green	Adam	Red	Dark Blue	Ryan	Adam	Individual	Adam	Individual	Individual			
Ryan	Individual	Blue	Kam	Pink	Dark Blue	Averey	Laurel	Individual	Veronica	Individual	Individual			
Flora	Individual	Light Blue	Leroy	Orange	Dark Blue	Adam	Brad	Individual	Steve	Individual				
Jay	Individual	Yellow	Nicole	Red	Red	Cara Maria	Nicole	Individual	Nicole	Individual				
Kam	Individual	Orange	Ryan	Pink	Orange	Leroy	Steve	Individual	Leroy					
Tina	Individual	Peach	Kefla	Red	Orange	Kefla	Derek	Individual						
Brad	Individual	Green	Rachel	Orange	Light Blue	Laurel	Flora							
Jasmine	Individual	Blue	Steve	Red	Light Blue	Derek								
Kefla	Individual	Light Blue	Tina	Green	Orange	Tina								
Brandon	Individual	Orange	Laurel	Red	Dark Blue									
Rachel	Individual	Light Blue	Brad	Green										
Ayanna	Individual	Light Blue	Syrus											
Syrus	N/A		Ayanna											
Tony	Individual	Yellow												
Janelle	Individual	Blue												
Tyri	Individual													

== Episodes ==
No. overall	No. in season	Title	Original release date
30	1	"A Sky Full of Stars"	April 10, 2024
31	2	"You Won't Break My Soul"	April 10, 2024
32	3	"True Colors"	April 17, 2024
33	4	"Starget"	April 24, 2024
34	5	"The Way You Make Me Steal"	May 1, 2024
35	6	"Karma Maria"	May 8, 2024
36	7	"Catch a Falling Star"	May 15, 2024
37	8	"The Queen's Gambit"	May 22, 2024
38	9	"Waiting For a Star to Fall"	May 29, 2024
39	10	"It Was a Good Jay"	June 5, 2024
40	11	"Live Free or Die Starred"	June 12, 2024
41	12	"Lone Star"	June 19, 2024
