= Road Rules 2007: Viewers' Revenge =

- Season 14
- Starring: Abram Boise; Adam Larson; Shane Landrum; Veronica Portillo; Kina Dean; Angel Turlington; Dan Walsh; David Leach; Ivory Martinez; Jerry Green; Kristen White; LaMonte Ponder; Derek McCray; Tori Hall; Mike Flatley
- Presented by: Drew Bell
- No. of episodes: 15

Release
- Original network: MTV
- Original release: January 30 – May 9, 2007

Season chronology
- ← Previous; Road Rules: X-Treme Next → -

Road Rules: Viewers' Revenge is the fourteenth and final season of the MTV reality television series Road Rules. The season premiered on January 30, 2007, at 9:00 pm EST/PST and ran through May 9, 2007. The cast is made up of six former Road Rulers and ten "Pit Crew" members. This is the first MTV reality show to be filmed and then aired in near real time with input from viewers at home.

The cast drove around California, Arizona, and Nevada competing in various missions. Each mission earned a prize of $10,000 to be pooled and split by the six cast members who made it to the finale. In addition to the cash prize, individual cast members won a Mazda3.

This season brought several changes, most notably the requirement for some to face-off against pit crew members for the right to stay on the RV. The cast was also given money and filming was not done on an ongoing schedule. This season also included new sponsorships from Wendy's and Mazda.

While this season was originally touted as bringing Road Rules out of hiatus, there have been no further seasons of Road Rules since.

== Production details ==
In 2004, after its 13th season had wrapped, the show had not been renewed by MTV and the production company of Road Rules officially stated that the show was "on hiatus". For the better part of two years, Bunim/Murray Productions lobbied to have the show's contract renewed, failing twice. Ultimately in 2006, Bunim-Murray Productions had announced that they were retooling the show to include an "interactive" portion of the series as part of a new section of their company. Viewers had input in the cast eliminations, and elimination face-offs aired exclusively as digital elements on mtv.com. In late 2006, MTV announced they were picking up the series once again, resulting in Viewers' Revenge. The season's working title was Road Rules 360.

== Cast ==
=== Alumni ===
MTV revealed the group of alumni who were invited back to participate on Monday, January 8, 2007. The group includes:

Name	Age^{1}	Original season	Currently from
Abram Boise	24	South Pacific	Boston, Massachusetts
Adam Larson	28	The Quest	Santa Monica, California
Kina Dean	23	X-Treme	Boston, Massachusetts
Shane Landrum	25	Campus Crawl	Chicago, Illinois
Susie Meister	27	Down Under	Pittsburgh, Pennsylvania
Veronica Portillo	29	Semester at Sea	Los Angeles, California

- ^Note 1: At time of filming.

=== Pit Crew ===
In addition, eight new cast members were brought on to compete with the alumni for spots on the RV. Two others, Derek and Mike, later joined this group. Derek joined after Abram was kicked off, opening up a spot in the total cast. The additional new cast members are called the "Pit Crew". The cast members who comprised the original "Pit Crew" are:

Name	Age^{1}	Hometown	Special Fact
Angel Turlington	22	Springfield, PA	She wants to remain a virgin until she is married.
Dan Walsh	23	St. Louis, MO	He is a Marine reservist who returned from Iraq in 2004.
David Leach	20	Kansas City, MO	He sent multiple videos to BMP in order to be cast.
Ivory Martinez	22	Brooklyn, NY	She thought that Kina was the hottest Roadie.
Jerry Jankowski	22	Fresno, California	He had difficulty getting along with his parents growing up.
Kristen White	25	Saline, MI	She has a boyfriend who is 5 years younger than her.
LaMonte Ponder	20	Decatur, GA	He is in a dance troupe and was a University of Georgia Orientation Leader in 2006.
Tori Hall	20	Midlothian, VA	Former Miss Virginia Teen USA
Derek McCray	24	Jacksonville, FL, born in Corry, PA	Over 200 colleges wanted to recruit him for football. Derek joined the cast after Abram was kicked off for fighting, opening up a spot in the total cast.
Mike Flatley	25	Plainsboro, New Jersey	Joined the Pit Crew the final weeks as the winner of Ask.com's 'You in The Crew' Sweepstakes.

- ^Note 1: At time of filming.

=== Cast duration ===
Road Rules: Viewers' Revenge cast
Week 1	Abram Boise	Adam Larson	Shane Landrum	Kina Dean	Susie Meister	Veronica Portillo
Week 2	Abram Boise	Adam Larson	Shane Landrum	Kina Dean	Susie Meister	Tori Hall
Week 3	Dan Walsh	Adam Larson	Shane Landrum	Kina Dean	Susie Meister	Tori Hall
Week 4	Dan Walsh	Adam Larson	Shane Landrum	Kina Dean	Susie Meister	Tori Hall
Week 5	Dan Walsh	Adam Larson	Shane Landrum	Kina Dean	Susie Meister	Tori Hall
Week 6	Dan Walsh	Adam Larson	Shane Landrum	Kina Dean	Angel Turlington	Tori Hall
Week 7	Dan Walsh	Adam Larson	Shane Landrum	Kina Dean	Angel Turlington	Tori Hall
Week 8	Dan Walsh	Adam Larson	David Leach	Kina Dean	Susie Meister	Tori Hall
Week 9	Derek McCray	Adam Larson	David Leach	Kina Dean	Susie Meister	Tori Hall
Week 10	Derek McCray	Adam Larson	David Leach	Kina Dean	Susie Meister	Tori Hall
Week 11	Derek McCray	Adam Larson	David Leach	Kina Dean	Susie Meister	Tori Hall
Week 12	Derek McCray	Adam Larson	David Leach	Kina Dean	Susie Meister	Tori Hall
Week 13	Derek McCray	Adam Larson	David Leach	Kina Dean	Susie Meister	Tori Hall
Week 14	Derek McCray	Adam Larson	David Leach	Kina Dean	Susie Meister	Tori Hall
Week 15	Derek McCray	Adam Larson	Dan Walsh	Kina Dean	Susie Meister	Tori Hall
Winners	Derek McCray	Adam Larson	LaMonte Ponder	Kina Dean	Susie Meister	Tori Hall

The contestant was sent to the Pit Crew
The contestant was nominated to the Elimination Pit
The contestant was sent home from the show
The contestant was supposed to go into pit but spared because of another contestants Disqualification

Road Rules: Viewers Revenge 2007 Pit Crew
Week 1	Angel Turlington	Dan Walsh	David Leach	Ivory Martinez	Kristen White	Jerry Jankowski	Monte Ponder	Tori Hall
Week 2	Angel Turlington	Dan Walsh	David Leach	Ivory Martinez	Kristen White	Jerry Jankowski	Monte Ponder	Veronica Portillo
Week 3	Angel Turlington		David Leach	Ivory Martinez	Kristen White	Jerry Jankowski	Monte Ponder	Veronica Portillo
Week 4	Angel Turlington		David Leach	Ivory Martinez	Kristen White	Jerry Jankowski	Monte Ponder	Veronica Portillo
Week 5	Angel Turlington		David Leach	Ivory Martinez	Kristen White	Jerry Jankowski	Monte Ponder	Veronica Portillo
Week 6	Susie Meister	Derek McCray	David Leach	Ivory Martinez	Kristen White	Jerry Jankowski	Monte Ponder	Veronica Portillo
Week 7	Susie Meister	Derek McCray	David Leach	Ivory Martinez	Kristen White	Jerry Jankowski	Monte Ponder	Veronica Portillo
Week 8	Angel Turlington	Derek McCray	Shane Landrum	Ivory Martinez	Kristen White	Jerry Jankowski	Monte Ponder	Veronica Portillo
Week 9	Angel Turlington	Dan Walsh	Shane Landrum	Ivory Martinez	Kristen White	Jerry Jankowski	Monte Ponder	Veronica Portillo
Week 10	Angel Turlington	Dan Walsh	Shane Landrum	Ivory Martinez	Kristen White	Jerry Jankowski	Monte Ponder	Veronica Portillo
Week 11	Angel Turlington	Dan Walsh	Shane Landrum	Ivory Martinez	Kristen White	Jerry Jankowski	Monte Ponder	Veronica Portillo
Week 12	Angel Turlington	Dan Walsh	Shane Landrum	Ivory Martinez	Kristen White	Jerry Jankowski	Monte Ponder	Veronica Portillo
Week 13	Angel Turlington	Dan Walsh	Shane Landrum	Ivory Martinez	Kristen White	Jerry Jankowski	Monte Ponder	Veronica Portillo
Week 14	Angel Turlington	Dan Walsh	Shane Landrum	Ivory Martinez	Kristen White	Jerry Jankowski	Monte Ponder	Veronica Portillo
Week 15	Angel Turlington	Mike Flatley	Shane Landrum	Ivory Martinez	Kristen White	Jerry Jankowski	Monte Ponder	Veronica Portillo
Losers	Angel Turlington	Mike Flatley	Shane Landrum	Ivory Martinez	Kristen White	Jerry Jankowski	Dan Walsh	Veronica Portillo

The contestant won a spot on the RV
The contestant was nominated to the Elimination Pit
There is no longer a Pit Crew member.

== Game summary ==
=== Rules ===
Rather than embarking on their trip several months before the air date, this show is being filmed and then broadcast in near real time. Cast members will only have the opportunity to compete in missions and nominate cast members for elimination. Viewers at home will be able to decide most other elements of the game from the MTV website.

The rules of Viewers' Revenge state after each mission, the group nominates one male and one female. The three male cast members are responsible for nominating the female. The three female cast members are responsible for nominating the male. Then viewers at home choose who, of those two people, will have to go into an elimination face-off. If they lose the face-off, the cast member will be replaced by one of the eight-member "Pit Crew." The replacement will be voted on by internet visitors to the MTV.com website. Voted off cast members are eligible to come back on the RV. After a cast member is voted off, they go back to the "Pit Crew".

Also, if the group loses two missions in a row, they must nominate two males and two females for an elimination face-off.

On episode three, due to Abram getting kicked off, it was announced only one castmember would be placed in the elimination pit, so long as the Roadies win their mission. If they lose their mission, they have to nominate two castmembers to the elimination pit.

Derek was cast and added to the Pit Crew after Abram was booted for violating the No-Violence policy.

On the final episode, David was booted from not only the RV but the show for sending unaired information to outside viewers which was a severe rule violation, saving Adam, who was nominated that day for the Pit.

Some missions were Pit Stops where the Pit Crew could win money that would be kept out of the team's bank account. They succeeded on the final Pit Stop, earning the Pit Crew $20,000.

=== Episodes ===
Episodes			Missions				Nominations
Number	Title	Original Airdate	Mission	Location	Status	Team Bank	Nominated to the Pit
1401	Road Rules is Back!	January 30, 2007	Car Bungee	False Lake; Universal Studios; Universal City, California	Completed	$10,000	Veronica; Shane
1402	Abram Gets the Boot (Again)	February 6, 2007	Swift Water Rescue	Encina Jetty; Carlsbad, California	Completed	$20,000	Susie; Adam
1403	A Pit Stop in the Sand	February 13, 2007	Tiring Sand Dunes (Pit Stop #1)	Sand Dunes; Pismo Beach, California	Completed	$30,000	Tori
1404	Rocks and a Hard Place	February 20, 2007	Carry Your Weight	Turtle Rock; Joshua Tree National Park; Joshua Tree, California	Completed	$40,000	Kina
1405	Up to Speed	February 27, 2007	Speed Racers	Laguna Seca Raceway; Monterey, California	Failed	$40,000	Susie
1406	World's Strongest Roadie	March 7, 2007	Strong Man Relay (Pit Stop #2)	Muscle Beach; Venice, California	Completed	$50,000	Adam
1407	The Roadies Do Spring Break	March 14, 2007	Beach Blast	Lake Havasu; Lake Havasu City, Arizona	Failed	$50,000	Angel; Shane
1408	Mountain Warfare	March 21, 2007	Freeze Off	Pickle Meadow; U.S. Marine Corps Training Facility; Bridgeport, California	Completed	$60,000	Dan
1409	Let's Get Dirty	March 28, 2007	Hoe-Down	Farming Facility; Moorpark, California	Completed	$70,000	David
1410	Assassins in Training	April 4, 2007	Desert Assassins Training	Mojave Desert, CA	Failed	$70,000	Derek
1411	Stick It	April 11, 2007	BMX and Inline skating stunts	Los Angeles, California	Failed	$70,000	Susie; Derek
1412	The Viewers' Revenge Bowl	April 18, 2007	Beach Flag Football (Pit Stop #3)	Mission Beach; San Diego, California	Completed	$80,000	David
1413	The Condemned	April 25, 2007	The Condemned	Stu Segall Studios; San Diego, California	Failed	$80,000	David
1414	Vegas Circus	May 2, 2007	Cirque du Soleil Audition	MGM Grand; Las Vegas, NV	Failed	$80,000	Tori; Adam
1415	Viewers' Revenge Finale	May 9, 2007	Drive-By (Pit Stop #4)	Deserted Highway	Failed	$80,000	Kina; Dan

^Note 1: The Roadies are exempt from nominating a cast member to the Pit due to Abram's elimination.

The group failed the mission
The group won the mission

=== Webisodes ===
	RV Castmembers Nominees		Pit Crew Nominees		Elimination Face-Off			Notes
Number	Male	Female	Male	Female	Online Airdate	Face-Off	Winner	Notes
1	Shane	Veronica	Monte	Tori	February 3, 2007	Whiplash	Tori	
2	None^{1}		Monte & Dan		February 10, 2007	Fumble	Dan	
3	Tori		Veronica		February 17, 2007	Shuttle Puzzle	Tori	
4	Kina		Angel		February 24, 2007	Scorpion	Kina	
5	Susie		Angel		March 3, 2007	Grip Breaker	Angel	
6	Adam		Monte		March 10, 2007	Balls Out!	Adam	
7	Shane	Angel	David	Susie	March 17, 2007	Fault Line	David & Susie	
8	Dan		Derek		March 24, 2007	Scorpion	Derek	
9	David		Shane		March 31, 2007	Fumble	David	
10	Derek		Dan		April 7, 2007	Grip Breaker	Derek	
11	Derek	Susie	Dan	Veronica	April 14, 2007	Knock Out	Derek & Susie	
12	David		Dan		April 23, 2007	Shockwave	David	
13	David		Dan		May 2, 2007	Balls Out!	David	
14	None^{2}	Tori	Shane & Dan	Kristen	May 9, 2007	Step it Up	Tori & Dan	
15	Dan	Kina	Monte	Angel	May 16, 2007	Codebreaker	Kina & Monte	

^Note 1: The Roadies are exempt from nominating a cast member to the Pit due to Abram's elimination.
^Note 2: The Roadies are exempt from nominating a male cast member to the Pit due to David's elimination.

The contestant went to the Elimination Pit and won
The contestant went to the Elimination Pit and lost

== After filming ==
Tori Hall married Brad Fiorenza on April 12, 2010. They have two children: John Brady Fiorenza (born August 4, 2011) and Chase Fiorenza (born January 13, 2015). The couple divorced in 2016. Hall then married lawyer Dusty Gwinn on October 23, 2020. In 2021, Hall announced she was expecting her third child. Christian Dean Gwinn was born on September 26, 2021.

David Leach moved to Los Angeles and is currently pursuing an acting career.

LaMonte Ponder is a choreographer in Atlanta and appeared in an episode on The Real World: Atlanta.

Flatley was later a contestant on Bromance. He died in 2014.

=== The Challenge ===
Cast member	Seasons of The Challenge
Angel Turlington	The Gauntlet III
Dan Walsh	The Island, Cutthroat (2010)
David Leach	—N/a
Derek McCray	The Gauntlet III, The Duel II
Ivory Martinez	—N/a
Jerry Jankowski	—N/a
Kristen White	—N/a
LaMonte Ponder	—N/a
Mike Flatley	—N/a
Tori Hall	The Gauntlet III, The Duel II, Cutthroat (2010)
