= Real World/Road Rules Challenge: Battle of the Sexes 2 =

9th season of the reality television series

Battle of the Sexes 2
- Season 9
- Presented by: Jonny Moseley
- No. of contestants: 36
- Winners: Dan Setzler; Eric Nies; Theo Vonkurnatowski
- Location: Galisteo, New Mexico
- Opening theme: "Come Out Fighting" by The Vandals
- No. of episodes: 17

Release
- Original network: MTV
- Original release: October 4, 2004 – January 31, 2005

Season chronology
- ← Previous; The Inferno Next → The Inferno II

Real World/Road Rules Challenge: Battle of the Sexes 2 is the ninth season of the MTV reality game show The Challenge (at the time known as Real World/Road Rules Challenge). The season directly follows The Inferno and took place in Santa Fe, New Mexico.

Battle of the Sexes 2 is the first season of The Challenge to be a sequel from an earlier season, the show's sixth season, Battle of the Sexes. A casting special titled "He Says She Says: The Battle for the Battle of the Sexes 2" aired on September 27, 2004. Battle of the Sexes 2 premiered on October 4, 2004, and concluded on January 31, 2005.

== Format ==
Before each challenge, each team choose three leaders. If the team won, those three leaders form the inner circle and decide whom to vote from their team; if the team lost, the rest of the team form the inner circle and vote off one of their three leaders. No life-shields were used during this season.

== Contestants ==
Male contestants	Original season	Finish
Dan Setzler	Road Rules: Northern Trail	Winner
Eric Nies	The Real World: New York	Winner
Theo Vonkurnatowski	Road Rules: Maximum Velocity Tour	Winner
Mark Long	Road Rules: USA – The First Adventure	Episode 16
Brad Fiorenza	The Real World: San Diego	Episode 15
Shane Landrum	Road Rules: Campus Crawl	Episode 14
Steven Hill	The Real World: Las Vegas	Episode 13 (Note: Steven was disqualified from the competition prior to the "Cast A Spell" challenge after slapping Shane.)
Randy Barry	The Real World: San Diego	Episode 12
Frank Roessler	The Real World: Las Vegas	Episode 11
Nick Haggart	Road Rules: X-Treme	Episode 10
Chris Graebe	Road Rules: South Pacific	Episode 9
Mike Mizanin	The Real World: Back to New York	Episode 8
Shawn Sealy	Road Rules: Semester at Sea	Episode 7
Derrick Kosinski	Road Rules: X-Treme	Episode 6
Abram Boise	Road Rules: South Pacific	Episode 5
Adam King	The Real World: Paris	Episode 4
Ace Amerson	The Real World: Paris	Episode 3
Jacquese Smith	The Real World: San Diego	Episode 2

Female contestants	Original season	Finish
Arissa Hill	The Real World: Las Vegas	Runner-up
Coral Smith	The Real World: Back to New York	Runner-up
Sophia Pasquis	Road Rules: The Quest	Runner-up
Tina Barta	Road Rules: South Pacific	Episode 16
Ruthie Alcaide	The Real World: Hawaii	Episode 15
Robin Hibbard	The Real World: San Diego	Episode 14
Tonya Cooley	The Real World: Chicago	Episode 13
Ibis Nieves	Road Rules: X-Treme	Episode 12
Veronica Portillo	Road Rules: Semester at Sea	Episode 11
Aneesa Ferreira	The Real World: Chicago	Episode 10
Katie Doyle	Road Rules: The Quest	Episode 9
Rachel Robinson	Road Rules: Campus Crawl	Episode 8
Angela Trimbur	Road Rules: X-Treme	Episode 7
Cynthia Roberts	The Real World: Miami	Episode 6
Ayanna Mackins	Road Rules: Semester at Sea	Episode 5
Kina Dean	Road Rules: X-Treme	Episode 4
Cameran Eubanks	The Real World: San Diego	Episode 3
Genesis Moss	The Real World: Boston	Episode 2

== Game summary ==
Episode		Winners	Team Leaders	Eliminated
#	Challenge	Winners	Team Leaders	Eliminated
1/2	Dangle Drop	Men	Abram, Adam, Eric	Jacquese
1/2	Dangle Drop	Men	Genesis, Rachel, Tina	Genesis
3	Snake Pit Poker	Men	Arissa, Coral, Cameran	Cameran
3	Snake Pit Poker	Men	Brad, Frank, Theo	Ace
4	Melt With You	Men	Dan, Shane, Shawn	Adam
4	Melt With You	Men	Aneesa, Ibis, Kina	Kina
5	Bombs Away	Men	Chris, Mark, Steven	Abram
5	Bombs Away	Men	Ayanna, Coral, Sophia	Ayanna
6	Junk Boat	Women	Derrick, Mike, Randy	Derrick
6	Junk Boat	Women	Robin, Ruthie, Veronica	Cynthia
7	High Noon	Men	Brad, Eric, Randy	Shawn
7	High Noon	Men	Angela, Arissa, Tonya	Angela
8	Fill 'Er Up	Men	Eric, Frank, Nick	Mike
8	Fill 'Er Up	Men	Rachel, Sophia, Tonya	Rachel
9	Sa Wing	Men	Brad, Shane, Theo	Chris
9	Sa Wing	Men	Ibis, Katie, Ruthie	Katie
10	Electro Shock	Men	Aneesa, Coral, Robin	Aneesa
10	Electro Shock	Men	Dan, Randy, Steven	Nick
11	Pop Culture Bike Jump	Women	Brad, Frank, Theo	Frank
11	Pop Culture Bike Jump	Women	Arissa, Sophia, Tina	Veronica
12	The Shredder	Men	Eric, Mark, Shane	Randy
12	The Shredder	Men	Ibis, Robin, Ruthie	Ibis
13	Cast A Spell	Men	Dan, Shane, Theo	—N/a
13	Cast A Spell	Men	Coral, Ruthie, Tonya	Tonya
14	Semi-Cross	Men	Brad, Dan, Mark	Shane
14	Semi-Cross	Men	Robin, Sophia, Tina	Robin
15	Car-Go	Men	Dan, Eric	Brad
15	Car-Go	Men	Ruthie, Tina	Ruthie
16	Vertigo	Women	Arissa, Coral	Tina
16	Vertigo	Women	Mark, Theo	Mark
17	Escape From Santa Fe	Men		

Women
Men

=== Elimination progress ===
Contestants	Episode															
Contestants	1/2	3	4	5	6	7	8	9	10	11	12	13	14	15	16	Finale
Dan	SAFE	SAFE	WIN	SAFE	SAFE	SAFE	SAFE	SAFE	WIN	SAFE	SAFE	WIN	WIN	WIN	SAFE	WINNER
Eric	WIN	SAFE	SAFE	SAFE	SAFE	WIN	WIN	SAFE	SAFE	SAFE	WIN	SAFE	SAFE	WIN	SAFE	WINNER
Theo	SAFE	WIN	SAFE	SAFE	SAFE	SAFE	SAFE	WIN	SAFE	NOM	SAFE	WIN	SAFE	SAFE	NOM	WINNER
Arissa	SAFE	NOM	SAFE	SAFE	SAFE	NOM	SAFE	SAFE	SAFE	WIN	SAFE	SAFE	SAFE	SAFE	WIN	LOSER
Coral	SAFE	NOM	SAFE	NOM	SAFE	SAFE	SAFE	SAFE	NOM	SAFE	SAFE	NOM	SAFE	SAFE	WIN	LOSER
Sophia	SAFE	SAFE	SAFE	NOM	SAFE	SAFE	NOM	SAFE	SAFE	WIN	SAFE	SAFE	NOM	SAFE	SAFE	LOSER
Mark	SAFE	SAFE	SAFE	WIN	SAFE	SAFE	SAFE	SAFE	SAFE	SAFE	WIN	SAFE	WIN	SAFE	OUT	
Tina	NOM	SAFE	SAFE	SAFE	SAFE	SAFE	SAFE	SAFE	SAFE	WIN	SAFE	SAFE	NOM	NOM	OUT	
Ruthie	SAFE	SAFE	SAFE	SAFE	WIN	SAFE	SAFE	NOM	SAFE	SAFE	NOM	NOM	SAFE	OUT		
Brad	SAFE	WIN	SAFE	SAFE	SAFE	WIN	SAFE	WIN	SAFE	NOM	SAFE	SAFE	WIN	OUT		
Robin	SAFE	SAFE	SAFE	SAFE	WIN	SAFE	SAFE	SAFE	NOM	SAFE	NOM	SAFE	OUT			
Shane	SAFE	SAFE	WIN	SAFE	SAFE	SAFE	SAFE	WIN	SAFE	SAFE	WIN	WIN	OUT			
Tonya	SAFE	SAFE	SAFE	SAFE	SAFE	NOM	NOM	SAFE	SAFE	SAFE	SAFE	OUT				
Steven	SAFE	SAFE	SAFE	WIN	SAFE	SAFE	SAFE	SAFE	WIN	SAFE	SAFE	DQ				
Ibis	SAFE	SAFE	NOM	SAFE	SAFE	SAFE	SAFE	NOM	SAFE	SAFE	OUT					
Randy	SAFE	SAFE	SAFE	SAFE	NOM	WIN	SAFE	SAFE	WIN	SAFE	OUT					
Veronica	SAFE	SAFE	SAFE	SAFE	WIN	SAFE	SAFE	SAFE	SAFE	OUT						
Frank	SAFE	WIN	SAFE	SAFE	SAFE	SAFE	WIN	SAFE	SAFE	OUT						
Nick	SAFE	SAFE	SAFE	SAFE	SAFE	SAFE	WIN	SAFE	OUT							
Aneesa	SAFE	SAFE	NOM	SAFE	SAFE	SAFE	SAFE	SAFE	OUT							
Katie	SAFE	SAFE	SAFE	SAFE	SAFE	SAFE	SAFE	OUT								
Chris	SAFE	SAFE	SAFE	WIN	SAFE	SAFE	SAFE	OUT								
Rachel	NOM	SAFE	SAFE	SAFE	SAFE	SAFE	OUT									
Mike	SAFE	SAFE	SAFE	SAFE	NOM	SAFE	OUT									
Angela	SAFE	SAFE	SAFE	SAFE	SAFE	OUT										
Shawn	SAFE	SAFE	WIN	SAFE	SAFE	OUT										
Cynthia	SAFE	SAFE	SAFE	SAFE	OUT											
Derrick	SAFE	SAFE	SAFE	SAFE	OUT											
Ayanna	SAFE	SAFE	SAFE	OUT												
Abram	WIN	SAFE	SAFE	OUT												
Kina	SAFE	SAFE	OUT													
Adam	WIN	SAFE	OUT													
Ace	SAFE	OUT														
Cameran	SAFE	OUT														
Genesis	OUT															
Jacquese	OUT															

Competition
The contestant won the Final Challenge
The contestant lost the Final Challenge
The contestant was team leader and won the challenge
The contestant was team leader, lost the challenge, but was not eliminated
The contestant was safe from elimination
The contestant was eliminated by the Inner Circle
The contestant was disqualified from the competition

=== Final results ===
- The three Guys remaining in the final challenge were Dan, Eric, and Theo
- The three Girls remaining in the final challenge were Arissa, Coral, and Sophia
- The Guys won the final challenge and won the $180,000 cash prize
  - Each team member received $60,000

== Episodes ==
No. overall	No. in season	Title	Original release date
106	1	"Howdy Santa Fe"	October 4, 2004
107	2	"Dangle Drop"	October 11, 2004
108	3	"Snake Pit Poker"	October 18, 2004
109	4	"Melt with You"	October 25, 2004
110	5	"Bombs Away"	November 1, 2004
111	6	"Junk Boat"	November 8, 2004
112	7	"High Noon"	November 15, 2004
113	8	"Fill'er Up"	November 22, 2004
114	9	"Sa-Wing"	November 29, 2004
115	10	"Electro-Shock"	December 6, 2004
116	11	"Pop Culture Bike Ramp"	December 13, 2004
117	12	"The Shredder"	December 20, 2004
118	13	"Cast a Spell"	December 27, 2004
119	14	"Semi-Cross"	January 3, 2005
120	15	"Car-Go"	January 10, 2005
121	16	"Vertigo"	January 17, 2005
122	17	"Handsome Reward"	January 24, 2005

=== Reunion special ===
The reunion special, Battle of the Sexes 2: Reunion - Secrets from Elimination Hill, was aired on January 31, 2005, and was hosted by VJ La La Vazquez.
