= Road Rules: Campus Crawl =

Season of television series

- Season 11
- Starring: Darrell Taylor; Eric Jones; Kendal Sheppard; Rachel Robinson; Sarah Greyson; Shane Landrum; Raquel Duran
- No. of episodes: 17

Release
- Original network: MTV
- Original release: June 10 – October 7, 2002

Season chronology
- ← Previous; Road Rules: The Quest Next → Road Rules: South Pacific

Road Rules: Campus Crawl is the eleventh season of the MTV reality television series Road Rules. The cast traveled around the United States, taking part in missions at various colleges and universities. A casting special aired on June 10, 2002, and the season premiered one week later on June 17, 2002.

== Cast ==
Cast member	Age^{1}	Hometown
Darrell Taylor	22	Oakland, California
Eric Jones	20	Fort Lauderdale, Florida
Kendal Sheppard	21	Seattle, Washington
Rachel Robinson	19	Miami, Florida
Sarah Greyson	19	Edmond, Oklahoma
Shane Landrum	20	Chapel Hill, North Carolina
Raquel Duran	18	Austin, Texas

- ^Note 1: At time of filming.

=== Duration of cast ===
Cast member	Episodes																
Cast member	1	2	3	4	5	6	7	8	9	10	11	12	13	14	15	16	17
Darrell	FEAT	FEAT	FEAT	FEAT	FEAT	FEAT	FEAT	FEAT	FEAT	FEAT	FEAT	FEAT	FEAT	FEAT	FEAT	FEAT	FEAT
Eric	FEAT	FEAT	FEAT	FEAT	FEAT	FEAT	FEAT	FEAT	FEAT	FEAT	FEAT	FEAT	FEAT	FEAT	FEAT	FEAT	FEAT
Kendal	FEAT	FEAT	FEAT	FEAT	FEAT	FEAT	FEAT	FEAT	FEAT	FEAT	FEAT	FEAT	FEAT	FEAT	FEAT	FEAT	FEAT
Rachel	FEAT	FEAT	FEAT	FEAT	FEAT	FEAT	FEAT	FEAT	FEAT	FEAT	FEAT	FEAT	FEAT	FEAT	FEAT	FEAT	FEAT
Shane	FEAT	FEAT	FEAT	FEAT	FEAT	FEAT	FEAT	FEAT	FEAT	FEAT	FEAT	FEAT	FEAT	FEAT	FEAT	FEAT	FEAT
Raquel										REP.	FEAT	FEAT	FEAT	FEAT	FEAT	FEAT	FEAT
Sarah	FEAT	FEAT	FEAT	FEAT	FEAT	FEAT	FEAT	FEAT	FEAT	VOTE							

Table key
FEAT = Cast member is featured on this episode
VOTE = Cast member is voted out of the show
REP. = Cast member replaces another cast member

== Missions ==
#	Mission	Result	Notes
1	Tight Rope Walk	Failed	
2	Freshman 15	Completed	
3	Rollin Rollin	Failed	Gave up prizes.
4	Basic Training	Completed	
5	Stepin	Completed	
6	Food Fight	Completed	
7	The Fraternity of Road Rules	Completed	
8	Posing Nude	Completed	
9	Dean Jumping	Completed	
10	Car Surfing	Failed	Sarah was voted out and replaced by Raquel.
11	Organ Barbeque	Completed	
12	Sex Ed 101	Completed	
13	Human Chandelier	Completed	
14	Pranking the Real World	Completed	
15	Face Off	Failed	Lost to The Real World: Las Vegas.
16	Leading the Blind	Completed	

== Episodes ==
No. overall	No. in season	Title	Original release date
155	1	"The Woodie Crawl"	June 17, 2002
156	2	"Here Piggy Piggy"	June 24, 2002
157	3	"Rollin Rollin"	July 1, 2002
158	4	"Marching to Sorrow"	July 8, 2002
159	5	"Rappin to Win"	July 15, 2002
160	6	"Slaps and Failure"	July 22, 2002
161	7	"Alligators, Bugs, and Snakes Oh My!!!"	July 29, 2002
162	8	"The Naked Truth"	August 5, 2002
163	9	"Dean Jumping"	August 12, 2002
164	10	"Surfing to Goodbye"	August 19, 2002
165	11	"Surfing to Goodbye (2)"	August 26, 2002
166	12	"Organs Anyone?"	September 2, 2002
167	13	"Sex Ed Gross Style"	September 9, 2002
168	14	"Falling Over Pain"	September 16, 2002
169	15	"Outwitting the World"	September 23, 2002
170	16	"Drinking and Wrestling"	September 30, 2002
171	17	"Blindfolded Around the World"	October 7, 2002

== After filming ==
Shane returned to the series as part of the alumni cast of Road Rules 2007: Viewers' Revenge. In 2014, he married Tony Beard. They were one of the first gay couples to marry in South Carolina. They split before Invasion of the Champions.

In 2007, Kendal welcomed her first son. In the subsequent year, she accused the father, Josh Henderson, of refusing to pay child support.

Darrell got married in 2017. The couple has two children.

Rachel married Natalie Gee on October 25, 2017. In the same year, Robinson gave birth to twins Jesse and Jack. In 2018, Gee gave birth to the couple's first daughter, Ari. She is expected to compete on the fifth season of The Traitors.

=== The Challenge ===
Cast member	Seasons of The Challenge	Other appearances
Darrell Taylor	The Gauntlet, The Inferno, The Inferno II, Fresh Meat, The Ruins, Fresh Meat II, Invasion of the Champions, XXX: Dirty 30, Double Agents, Ride or Dies, Battle of the Eras	Spring Break Challenge, The Challenge: Champs vs. Pros, The Challenge: All Stars (season 1), The Challenge: All Stars (season 2), The Challenge: All Stars (season 3), The Challenge: World Championship
Eric Jones	Battle of the Sexes	—N/a
Kendal Sheppard	The Inferno	The Challenge: All Stars (season 1), The Challenge: All Stars (season 2), The Challenge: All Stars (season 3)
Rachel Robinson	Battle of the Sexes, The Gauntlet, Battle of the Sexes 2, The Inferno II, The Island, The Duel II, Battle of the Exes, Battle of the Eras	Spring Break Challenge, The Challenge: All Stars (season 4)
Sarah Greyson	The Gauntlet	—N/a
Shane Landrum	Battle of the Sexes, The Inferno, Battle of the Sexes 2, Fresh Meat, Invasion of the Champions, Vendettas, Final Reckoning	The Challenge: Champs vs. Stars (season 2), The Challenge: All Stars (season 5)
Raquel Duran	—N/a	—N/a

Note: Darrell appeared on Vendettas and Battle for a New Champion for an elimination. Rachel appeared on Cutthroat (2026) for an elimination.
