= Real World/Road Rules Challenge: The Gauntlet =

7th season of the reality television series

The Gauntlet
- Season 7
- Presented by: Jonny Moseley
- No. of contestants: 28
- Winners: Adam Larson; Cara Zavaleta; Darrell Taylor; Dave Giuntoli; Rachel Robinson; Roni Martin; Sarah Greyson; Theo Vonkurnatowski; Veronica Portillo
- Location: Telluride, Colorado
- Opening theme: "It's" by Ill Kidd
- No. of episodes: 16

Release
- Original network: MTV
- Original release: September 29, 2003 – January 26, 2004

Season chronology
- ← Previous; Battle of the Sexes Next → The Inferno

Real World/Road Rules Challenge: The Gauntlet is the seventh season of the MTV reality game show, The Challenge (at the time known as Real World/Road Rules Challenge). The season is directly subsequent to Battle of the Sexes. The Gauntlet featured 28 castmates competing in missions with an immunity life-saver awarded to the best individual performer. Each team would then select a player from their team to go into the Gauntlet elimination challenge. It was hosted by Jonny Moseley. This season was nominated for a GLAAD Media Award for outstanding reality program.

Filming was originally planned to began in July 2003 in Middletown, RI, but in June a local judge blocked it at request of local residents who thought it would be "materially disruptive". The show instead ended up being filmed in Telluride, CO, and finished filming in August 2003. A casting special, Real World/Road Rules Corral: A Guide To The Gauntlet was aired on September 22, 2003. The season premiered one week later on September 29, 2003, and concluded on January 26, 2004, with the season in-review special.

This is the first edition of the Gauntlet series, with The Gauntlet 2 following in 2005–2006 and The Gauntlet III following in 2008.

== Contestants ==
Real World team
| Player | Original season | Finish |
|---|---|---|
| Alton Williams | The Real World: Las Vegas | Runner-up |
| Coral Smith | The Real World: Back to New York | Runner-up (Note: Coral was removed from the final challenge due to an allergic reaction to a spider bite that needed medical attention.) |
| Mike Mizanin | The Real World: Back to New York | Runner-up |
| Nathan Blackburn | The Real World: Seattle | Runner-up |
| Norman Korpi | The Real World: New York | Runner-up |
| Theo Gantt | The Real World: Chicago | Episode 14 |
| Irulan Wilson | The Real World: Las Vegas | Episode 13 |
| Rachel Braband | The Real World: Back to New York | Episode 10 |
| Trishelle Cannatella | The Real World: Las Vegas | Episode 9 |
| Elka Walker | The Real World: Boston | Episode 7 |
| Matt Smith | The Real World: New Orleans | Episode 6 |
| Tonya Cooley | The Real World: Chicago | Episode 3 |
| Montana McGlynn | The Real World: Boston | Episode 2 |
| David Broom | The Real World: New Orleans | Episode 1 |

Road Rules team
| Player | Original season | Finish |
|---|---|---|
| Adam Larson | Road Rules: The Quest | Winner |
| Cara Zavaleta | Road Rules: South Pacific | Winner |
| Darrell Taylor | Road Rules: Campus Crawl | Winner |
| Dave Giuntoli | Road Rules: South Pacific | Winner |
| Rachel Robinson | Road Rules: Campus Crawl | Winner |
| Roni Martin | Road Rules: Northern Trail | Winner |
| Sarah Greyson | Road Rules: Campus Crawl | Winner |
| Theo Vonkurnatowski | Road Rules: Maximum Velocity Tour | Winner |
| Veronica Portillo | Road Rules: Semester at Sea | Winner |
| Abram Boise | Road Rules: South Pacific | Episode 12 |
| Laterrian Wallace | Road Rules: Maximum Velocity Tour | Episode 11 |
| Steve Meinke | Road Rules: The Quest | Episode 8 |
| Tina Barta | Road Rules: South Pacific | Episode 5 |
| Katie Doyle | Road Rules: The Quest | Episode 4 |

== Gameplay ==
=== Gauntlet games ===
- Ride 'Em Cowboy: Players have to hold on to a mechanical bull with just one hand. Whoever falls off first loses.
  - Played by: Katie vs. Montana, Rachel B. vs. Sarah, Cara vs. Theo G.
- Dead Man's Drop: Players are suspended 10 feet into the air on a pole. They have to hold on to the pole by hanging upside down with their legs.
  - Played by: David vs. Sarah, Coral vs. Tina, Matt vs. Sarah, Irulan vs. Sarah
- Hangman: Similar to Dead Man's Drop, players are still suspended 10 feet into the air, only they hang on the pole with their hands and are positioned right side up.
  - Played by: Katie vs. Rachel B.
- Perfect Fit: Players first must jump into a pool and pick up their respective puzzle pieces (which are scattered about the pool). The first player to solve the puzzle wins.
  - Played by: Steve vs. Tonya, Steve vs. Trishelle, Sarah vs. Trishelle
- Knock Your Block Off: Players joust on a beam right above a pool. Whoever gets knocked off first loses.
  - Played by: Cara vs. Elka, Abram vs. Mike
- Pole Climb: Players climb a 10-foot pole. Whoever gets to the top first pulls a lever that drops the opponent's pole into the pool.
  - Played by: Alton vs. Laterrian

== Game summary ==
| Episode | | Winners | Freshlook Eyesaver | | Gauntlet contestants | | Gauntlet game | Gauntlet outcome | |
| # | Challenge | Winners | Real World | Road Rules | Real World | Road Rules | Gauntlet game | Winner | Eliminated |
|---|---|---|---|---|---|---|---|---|---|
| 1 | Snake Soup | Real World | —N/a | | David | Sarah | Dead Man's Drop | Sarah | David |
| 2 | Masquerade | Road Rules | —N/a | | Montana | Katie | Ride 'Em Cowboy | Katie | Montana |
| 3 | Mud Bath | Road Rules | —N/a | | Tonya | Steve | Perfect Fit | Steve | Tonya |
| 4 | I Scream | Road Rules | —N/a | | Rachel B. | Katie | Hangman | Rachel B. | Katie |
| 5 | Holey Canoe | Road Rules | —N/a | | Coral | Tina | Dead Man's Drop | Coral | Tina |
| 6 | Heavyweight Hustle | Real World | —N/a | | Matt | Sarah | Dead Man's Drop | Sarah | Matt |
| 7 | Sink My Ship | Road Rules | Norman | Dave | Elka | Cara | Knock Your Block Off | Cara | Elka |
| 8 | Red Barron | Road Rules | Nathan | Adam | Trishelle | Steve | Perfect Fit | Trishelle | Steve |
| 9 | Inferno | Real World | Alton | Theo V. | Trishelle | Sarah | Perfect Fit | Sarah | Trishelle |
| 10 | Rolling On A River | Road Rules | Mike | Roni | Rachel B. | Sarah | Ride 'Em Cowboy | Sarah | Rachel B. |
| 11 | Turntable | Road Rules | Theo G. | Veronica | Alton | Laterrian | Pole Climb | Alton | Laterrian |
| 12 | All Or Nothing | Real World | Alton | Theo V. | Mike | Abram | Knock Your Block Off | Mike | Abram |
| 13 | Vertical Sweep | Real World | Alton | Adam | Irulan | Sarah | Dead Man's Drop | Sarah | Irulan |
| 14 | Dukes Of Saturn | Real World | Alton | Veronica | Theo G. | Cara | Ride 'Em Cowboy | Cara | Theo G. |
| 15 | Gold Rush | Road Rules | | | | | | | |

Bank Accounts

- Real World - $60,000
  - $12,000 each
- Road Rules - $230,000
  - $25,555 each

=== Elimination progress ===
| Contestants | Episodes | | | | | | | | | | | | | | |
| Contestants | 1 | 2 | 3 | 4 | 5 | 6 | 7 | 8 | 9 | 10 | 11 | 12 | 13 | 14 | Finale |
|---|---|---|---|---|---|---|---|---|---|---|---|---|---|---|---|
| Adam | SAFE | SAFE | SAFE | SAFE | SAFE | SAFE | SAFE | WIN | SAFE | SAFE | SAFE | SAFE | WIN | SAFE | WINNER |
| Cara | SAFE | SAFE | SAFE | SAFE | SAFE | SAFE | ELIM | SAFE | SAFE | SAFE | SAFE | SAFE | SAFE | ELIM | WINNER |
| Darrell | SAFE | SAFE | SAFE | SAFE | SAFE | SAFE | SAFE | SAFE | SAFE | SAFE | SAFE | SAFE | SAFE | SAFE | WINNER |
| Dave | SAFE | SAFE | SAFE | SAFE | SAFE | SAFE | WIN | SAFE | SAFE | SAFE | SAFE | SAFE | SAFE | SAFE | WINNER |
| Rachel R. | SAFE | SAFE | SAFE | SAFE | SAFE | SAFE | SAFE | SAFE | SAFE | SAFE | SAFE | SAFE | SAFE | SAFE | WINNER |
| Roni | SAFE | SAFE | SAFE | SAFE | SAFE | SAFE | SAFE | SAFE | SAFE | WIN | SAFE | SAFE | SAFE | SAFE | WINNER |
| Sarah | ELIM | SAFE | SAFE | SAFE | SAFE | ELIM | SAFE | SAFE | ELIM | ELIM | SAFE | SAFE | ELIM | SAFE | WINNER |
| Theo V. | SAFE | SAFE | SAFE | SAFE | SAFE | SAFE | SAFE | SAFE | WIN | SAFE | SAFE | WIN | SAFE | SAFE | WINNER |
| Veronica | SAFE | SAFE | SAFE | SAFE | SAFE | SAFE | SAFE | SAFE | SAFE | SAFE | WIN | SAFE | SAFE | WIN | WINNER |
| Alton | SAFE | SAFE | SAFE | SAFE | SAFE | SAFE | SAFE | SAFE | WIN | SAFE | ELIM | WIN | WIN | WIN | LOSER |
| Mike | SAFE | SAFE | SAFE | SAFE | SAFE | SAFE | SAFE | SAFE | SAFE | WIN | SAFE | ELIM | SAFE | SAFE | LOSER |
| Nathan | SAFE | SAFE | SAFE | SAFE | SAFE | SAFE | SAFE | WIN | SAFE | SAFE | SAFE | SAFE | SAFE | SAFE | LOSER |
| Norman | SAFE | SAFE | SAFE | SAFE | SAFE | SAFE | WIN | SAFE | SAFE | SAFE | SAFE | SAFE | SAFE | SAFE | LOSER |
| Coral | SAFE | SAFE | SAFE | SAFE | ELIM | SAFE | SAFE | SAFE | SAFE | SAFE | SAFE | SAFE | SAFE | SAFE | MED |
| Theo G. | SAFE | SAFE | SAFE | SAFE | SAFE | SAFE | SAFE | SAFE | SAFE | SAFE | WIN | SAFE | SAFE | OUT | |
| Irulan | SAFE | SAFE | SAFE | SAFE | SAFE | SAFE | SAFE | SAFE | SAFE | SAFE | SAFE | SAFE | OUT | | |
| Abram | SAFE | SAFE | SAFE | SAFE | SAFE | SAFE | SAFE | SAFE | SAFE | SAFE | SAFE | OUT | | | |
| Laterrian | SAFE | SAFE | SAFE | SAFE | SAFE | SAFE | SAFE | SAFE | SAFE | SAFE | OUT | | | | |
| Rachel B. | SAFE | SAFE | SAFE | ELIM | SAFE | SAFE | SAFE | SAFE | SAFE | OUT | | | | | |
| Trishelle | SAFE | SAFE | SAFE | SAFE | SAFE | SAFE | SAFE | ELIM | OUT | | | | | | |
| Steve | SAFE | SAFE | ELIM | SAFE | SAFE | SAFE | SAFE | OUT | | | | | | | |
| Elka | SAFE | SAFE | SAFE | SAFE | SAFE | SAFE | OUT | | | | | | | | |
| Matt | SAFE | SAFE | SAFE | SAFE | SAFE | OUT | | | | | | | | | |
| Tina | SAFE | SAFE | SAFE | SAFE | OUT | | | | | | | | | | |
| Katie | SAFE | ELIM | SAFE | OUT | | | | | | | | | | | |
| Tonya | SAFE | SAFE | OUT | | | | | | | | | | | | |
| Montana | SAFE | OUT | | | | | | | | | | | | | |
| David | OUT | | | | | | | | | | | | | | |

Teams
The contestant is on the Real World team
The contestant is on the Road Rules team
Competition
The contestant won the final challenge
The contestant lost the final challenge
The contestant won the Freshlook Eyesaver Winner and was safe from the Gauntlet
The contestant was not selected to go into the Gauntlet
The contestant won the Gauntlet
The contestant lost the Gauntlet and was eliminated
The contestant was removed from the final challenge due to illness

== Episodes ==
| No. overall | No. in season | Title | Original release date |
|---|---|---|---|
| 73 | 1 | "Howdy Telluride" | September 29, 2003 |
| 74 | 2 | "Masquerade" | October 6, 2003 |
| 75 | 3 | "Mud Bath" | October 13, 2003 |
| 76 | 4 | "I Scream" | October 20, 2003 |
| 77 | 5 | "Holey Canoe" | October 27, 2003 |
| 78 | 6 | "Heavyweight Hustle" | November 3, 2003 |
| 79 | 7 | "Sink My Ship" | November 10, 2003 |
| 80 | 8 | "Red Barron" | November 17, 2003 |
| 81 | 9 | "Inferno" | November 24, 2003 |
| 82 | 10 | "Rolling on the River" | December 1, 2003 |
| 83 | 11 | "Turntable" | December 8, 2003 |
| 84 | 12 | "All or Nothing" | December 15, 2003 |
| 85 | 13 | "Vertical Limit" | December 29, 2003 |
| 86 | 14 | "Dukes of Saturn" | January 5, 2004 |
| 87 | 15 | "Gold Rush Part 1" | January 12, 2004 |
| 88 | 16 | "Gold Rush Part 2" | January 19, 2004 |

=== After filming ===
Instead of a reunion special, Battle Scars - From the Gauntlet to the Inferno, a follow-up special aired on January 26, 2004, introducing the next season, Real World/Road Rules Challenge: The Inferno with commentary by few of this season's contestants.
