= Real World/Road Rules Challenge: The Inferno =

8th season of the reality television series

Coordinates: 16°49′59″N 99°51′28″W

The Inferno
- Season 8
- Presented by: Dave Mirra
- No. of contestants: 20
- Winners: Abram Boise; Christena Pyle; Darrell Taylor; Holly Shand; Katie Doyle; Kendal Sheppard; Timmy Beggy; Veronica Portillo
- Location: Acapulco, Mexico
- Opening theme: "Miles Apart" by Yellowcard
- No. of episodes: 19

Release
- Original network: MTV
- Original release: February 2 – May 31, 2004

Season chronology
- ← Previous; The Gauntlet Next → Battle of the Sexes 2

Real World/Road Rules Challenge: The Inferno is the eighth season of the MTV reality game show, The Challenge (at the time known as Real World/Road Rules Challenge). The season is directly subsequent to The Gauntlet and took place in Acapulco, Mexico.

This is the first edition of The Inferno series, with The Inferno II and The Inferno 3 following in 2005 and 2007, respectively.

== Format ==
In this challenge, the winning teams would receive a prize at the end of each mission. They would then nominate two players from their team to the Inferno elimination challenge. Unlike The Gauntlet, there would be another challenge with an immunity life-saver up for grabs before the Inferno. Each team then selected one of the two nominees from the opposing team to go into the Inferno.

== Contestants ==
Real World team
Player	Original season	Finish
Coral Smith	The Real World: Back to New York	Runner-up
Chris "CT" Tamburello	The Real World: Paris	Runner-up
Mike Mizanin	The Real World: Back to New York	Runner-up
Syrus Yarbrough	The Real World: Boston	Runner-up
David Burns	The Real World: Seattle	Episode 16
Leah Gillingwater	The Real World: Paris	Episode 15
Julie Stoffer	The Real World: New Orleans	Episode 12
Mallory Snyder	The Real World: Paris	Episode 8
Trishelle Cannatella	The Real World: Las Vegas	Episode 4
Ace Amerson	The Real World: Paris	Episode 2

Road Rules team
Player	Original season	Finish
Abram Boise	Road Rules: South Pacific	Winner
Christena Pyle	Road Rules: South Pacific	Winner
Darrell Taylor	Road Rules: Campus Crawl	Winner
Holly Shand	Road Rules: Latin America	Winner
Katie Doyle	Road Rules: The Quest	Winner
Kendal Sheppard	Road Rules: Campus Crawl	Winner
Timmy Beggy	Road Rules: USA – The Second Adventure	Winner
Veronica Portillo	Road Rules: Semester at Sea	Winner
Shane Landrum	Road Rules: Campus Crawl	Episode 10
Jeremy Blossom	Road Rules: South Pacific	Episode 6

== Gameplay ==
=== Inferno games ===
- Bug Helmet:The contestants put their heads into glass boxes filled with hundreds of cockroaches with syrup covering their face. The player who stays in their box the longest wins.
  - Played by: Ace vs. Jeremy
- Chili Counter:The player who eats the most chilis in a one-hour sitting wins.
  - Played by: Holly vs. Trishelle
- Human Candelabra:The two players have a candle in each hand while holding their arm's out straight, the player who holds that position the longest wins.
  - Played by: Jeremy vs. Mike
- Noise Pollution: Each player must wear a set of headphones while standing on a two-foot high platform for two hours. If there is a tie, then the players must stand on a four-inch block with one leg, the last person standing wins.
  - Played by: Christena vs. Mallory
- Don't Toss Your Cookies: The players must eat cookies and drink milk, then get onto a spinning platform for 10 minutes, they continue this until one of the players vomits. The player who does not vomit wins the Inferno.
  - Played by: CT vs. Shane
- Scratchathon: Each player is covered in itching powder and must walk on a treadmill for three hours, whoever outlasts their opponent wins. In the event of a tie, each contestant must jump rope, whoever jump ropes the longest wins the Inferno.
  - Played by: Julie vs. Katie
- Brick by Brick: The players must transfer their bricks one at a time from one pile to the next, while walking across a plank. Players are disqualified if they drop a brick, break one, or fall off the plank. Whoever has transferred the most bricks at the end of three and a half hours wins.
  - Played by: Kendal vs Leah
- Smell You Later: The contestants are each placed into their own plexiglass coffins, after every half hour for the first hour and a half, another layer of bad smelling substances are added to the coffins. At the end of four hours, if both players are still in their coffins, each player must hold their breath in the water, whoever holds it the longest wins the Inferno.
  - Played by: David vs. Katie

== Game summary ==
Episode		Winners	Aztec Life Saver		Inferno Selections				Inferno game	Inferno outcome	
#	Challenge	Winners	Real World	Road Rules	Real World		Road Rules		Inferno game	Winner	Eliminated
1	Grope the Rope	Road Rules			Ace	Syrus	Jeremy	Timmy			
2	Bird Feeder	Real World	Syrus	Darrell		Ace			Bug Helmet	Jeremy	Ace
3	Wreck N' Roll	Road Rules			Leah	Trishelle	Holly	Katie			
4	Climbing Wall	Road Rules	CT	Timmy					Chili Counter	Holly	Trishelle
5	Disco Domino Derby	Real World			David	Mike	Abram	Jeremy			
6	Balls Out	Real World	CT	Veronica					Human Candelabra	Mike	Jeremy
7	Ultimate Saturn Road Trip	Road Rules			Coral	Mallory	Christena	Katie			
8	Don't Yank My Chain	Road Rules	Mike	Veronica					Noise Pollution	Christena	Mallory
9	Come Sail Away	Road Rules			CT	David	Abram	Shane			
10	Bungee Bound	Road Rules	CT	Holly		CT			Don't Toss Your Cookies	CT	Shane
11	Twist And Shoot	Road Rules			Julie	Leah	Katie	Veronica			
12	Balcony Swing	Real World	CT	Veronica				Katie	Scratchathon	Katie	Julie
13	Fallen Angels	Road Rules			David	Syrus	Darrell	Timmy			
14/15	Saturn Valet Ballet	Road Rules	David	Kendal	Leah			Kendal	Brick by Brick	Kendal	Leah
15/16	Window Washing	Road Rules			Coral	—N/a	Katie	Veronica			
15/16	Window Washing	Road Rules	Coral	Veronica	David			Katie	Smell You Later	Katie	David
16/17	Seven Deadly Sins	Road Rules									

=== Elimination progress ===
Contestants	Episodes															
Contestants	1	2	3	4	5	6	7	8	9	10	11	12	13	14/15	15/16	Finale
Abram	SAFE	SAFE	SAFE	SAFE	RISK	SAFE	SAFE	SAFE	RISK	SAFE	SAFE	SAFE	SAFE	SAFE	SAFE	WINNER
Christena	SAFE	SAFE	SAFE	SAFE	SAFE	SAFE	NOM	ELIM	SAFE	SAFE	SAFE	SAFE	SAFE	SAFE	SAFE	WINNER
Darrell	SAFE	WON	SAFE	SAFE	SAFE	SAFE	SAFE	SAFE	SAFE	SAFE	SAFE	SAFE	RISK	SAFE	SAFE	WINNER
Holly	SAFE	SAFE	NOM	ELIM	SAFE	SAFE	SAFE	SAFE	SAFE	WON	SAFE	SAFE	SAFE	SAFE	SAFE	WINNER
Katie	SAFE	SAFE	RISK	SAFE	SAFE	SAFE	RISK	SAFE	SAFE	SAFE	RISK	ELIM	SAFE	SAFE	ELIM	WINNER
Kendal	SAFE	SAFE	SAFE	SAFE	SAFE	SAFE	SAFE	SAFE	SAFE	SAFE	SAFE	SAFE	SAFE	VOL	SAFE	WINNER
Timmy	RISK	SAFE	SAFE	WON	SAFE	SAFE	SAFE	SAFE	SAFE	SAFE	SAFE	SAFE	NOM	SAVE	SAFE	WINNER
Veronica	SAFE	SAFE	SAFE	SAFE	SAFE	WON	SAFE	WON	SAFE	SAFE	NOM	WIN	SAFE	SAFE	WIN	WINNER
Coral	SAFE	SAFE	SAFE	SAFE	SAFE	SAFE	RISK	SAFE	SAFE	SAFE	SAFE	SAFE	SAFE	SAFE	WIN	LOSER
CT	SAFE	SAFE	SAFE	WON	SAFE	WON	SAFE	SAFE	RISK	VOL	SAFE	WON	SAFE	SAFE	SAFE	LOSER
Mike	SAFE	SAFE	SAFE	SAFE	NOM	ELIM	SAFE	WON	SAFE	SAFE	SAFE	SAFE	SAFE	SAFE	SAFE	LOSER
Syrus	NOM	WIN	SAFE	SAFE	SAFE	SAFE	SAFE	SAFE	SAFE	SAFE	SAFE	SAFE	RISK	SAFE	SAFE	LOSER
David	SAFE	SAFE	SAFE	SAFE	RISK	SAFE	SAFE	SAFE	NOM	SAVE	SAFE	SAFE	NOM	WIN	OUT	
Leah	SAFE	SAFE	RISK	SAFE	SAFE	SAFE	SAFE	SAFE	SAFE	SAFE	RISK	SAFE	SAFE	OUT		
Julie	SAFE	SAFE	SAFE	SAFE	SAFE	SAFE	SAFE	SAFE	SAFE	SAFE	NOM	OUT				
Shane	SAFE	SAFE	SAFE	SAFE	SAFE	SAFE	SAFE	SAFE	NOM	OUT						
Mallory	SAFE	SAFE	SAFE	SAFE	SAFE	SAFE	NOM	OUT								
Jeremy	NOM	ELIM	SAFE	SAFE	NOM	OUT										
Trishelle	SAFE	SAFE	NOM	OUT												
Ace	RISK	OUT														

Teams
The contestant is on the Real World team
The contestant is on the Road Rules team
Competition
The contestant won the final challenge
The contestant lost the final challenge
The contestant won the Aztec Life Saver and saved themselves
The contestant won the Aztec Life Saver but chose not to use it
The contestant was safe from the Inferno
The contestant was selected to go into the Inferno
The contestant was nominated but not selected to go into the Inferno
The contestant was saved by the Aztec Life Saver winner
The contestant was selected to go into the Inferno and won
The contestant won the Aztec Life Saver, went into the Inferno and won
The contestant was put into the Inferno and lost

== Episodes ==
No. overall	No. in season	Title	Original release date
89	1	"Grope the Rope"	February 2, 2004
90	2	"Birdfeeder"	February 2, 2004
91	3	"Wreck n' Roll"	February 9, 2004
92	4	"Climbing Wall"	February 16, 2004
93	5	"Disco Domino Derby"	February 23, 2004
94	6	"Balls Out"	March 1, 2004
95	7	"Ultimate Saturn Road Trip"	March 8, 2004
96	8	"Don't Yank My Chain"	March 15, 2004
97	9	"Come Sail Away"	March 22, 2004
98	10	"Bungee Bound"	March 29, 2004
99	11	"Twist and Shoot"	April 5, 2004
100	12	"Balcony Swing"	April 12, 2004
101	13	"Fallen Angels"	April 19, 2004
102	14	"Saturn Valet Ballet"	May 3, 2004
103	15	"Window Washing"	May 10, 2004
104	16	"The Final Burn"	May 17, 2004
105	17	"Handsome Reward"	May 24, 2004

=== Reunion special ===
The reunion special, Montezuma's Revenge: Inside the Inferno, was aired on May 31, 2004, featuring the finalists and was hosted by VJ La La Vazquez.
