= Real World/Road Rules Challenge: The Inferno II =

10th season of the reality television series

The Inferno II
- Season 10
- Presented by: Dave Mirra
- No. of contestants: 20
- Winners: Darrell Taylor; Jamie Chung; Landon Lueck; Mike Mizanin
- Location: Manzanillo, Mexico
- Opening theme: "Inferno" by Ill Kidd
- No. of episodes: 16

Release
- Original network: MTV
- Original release: March 7 – June 20, 2005

Season chronology
- ← Previous; Battle of the Sexes 2 Next → The Gauntlet 2

Real World/Road Rules Challenge: The Inferno II is the 10th season of the MTV reality game show, The Challenge (at the time known as Real World/Road Rules Challenge). The season is directly subsequent to Battle of the Sexes 2.

The Inferno II is the second of The Inferno series, with the original Inferno airing in 2004, and The Inferno 3 following in 2007. The show aired in 2005, and took place in Manzanillo, Mexico.

On December 15, 2020, the season was made available to stream on Netflix in the United States.

== Format ==
This challenge was the same as The Inferno, except this time each team was allowed to choose only one "Inferno nominee" from the opposite team. This nominee had to win the "life shield" to save him or herself. The contestants in this challenge were grouped into two teams of "Good Guys" and "Bad Asses", representing the "heroes" and "villains" of their respective seasons.

== Contestants ==
Bad Asses team
Player	Original season	Finish
Abram Boise	Road Rules: South Pacific	Runner-up
Chris "CT" Tamburello	The Real World: Paris	Runner-up
Derrick Kosinski	Road Rules: X-Treme	Runner-up
Rachel Robinson	Road Rules: Campus Crawl	Runner-up
Tina Barta	Road Rules: South Pacific	Runner-up
Tonya Cooley	The Real World: Chicago	Runner-up
Veronica Portillo	Road Rules: Semester at Sea	Runner-up
Dan Renzi	The Real World: Miami	Episode 14
Karamo Brown	The Real World: Philadelphia	Episode 6
Beth Stolarczyk	The Real World: Los Angeles	Episode 5 (Note: Beth quit the competition at the beginning of Episode 5 after not feeling safe in the house following a heated altercation with Tonya.)

Good Guys team
Player	Original season	Finish
Darrell Taylor	Road Rules: Campus Crawl	Winner
Jamie Chung	The Real World: San Diego	Winner
Landon Lueck	The Real World: Philadelphia	Winner
Mike Mizanin	The Real World: Back to New York	Winner
Shavonda Billingslea	The Real World: Philadelphia	Episode 15
Julie Stoffer	The Real World: New Orleans	Episode 12
Brad Fiorenza	The Real World: San Diego	Episode 10
Jodi Weatherton	Road Rules: X-Treme	Episode 8
Robin Hibbard	The Real World: San Diego	Episode 4
Jon Brennan	The Real World: Los Angeles	Episode 2

== Gameplay ==
=== Inferno games ===
- Hang Tough: Contestants had to hang on monkey bars and try and knock their opponent off. The last player standing wins the Inferno.
  - Played by: Dan vs. Jon
- Shack Attack: Each player will be shackled by the waist to a wall and must run across the field to retrieve a key that will unlock their harness. The first player to unlock their harness wins the Inferno.
  - Played by: Tina vs. Robin
- Knock Your Block Off: Each contestant will wear a helmet with a block fastened on top. The object of the game is to try and knock the block off their opponent's head using a pugil stick. Whoever knocks their opponents block off wins the Inferno.
  - Played by: Landon vs. Karamo
- That's A Wrap: The objective is to mummify yourself using a long spool of cloth. The first person to completely finish their spool and run across the field to their team flag wins the Inferno.
  - Played by: Veronica vs. Jodi
- Balls In: Each player will be given five chances to get as many balls inside a basket. If a player steps out of the ring the basket is surrounded by, their ball is considered "dead." The player who has more baskets than their opponent wins the Inferno.
  - Played by: Abram vs. Brad
- Patch Work: Each player will be harnessed to a bungee while wearing a gymsuit with 27 patches. The object is to rip off all the patches from the opposing player and place as many patches as they can in their basket. The player with the most patches in their basket wins the Inferno.
  - Played by: Tonya vs. Julie
- Pegged: Each player must climb to the top of a wall using two pegs. The player who can get to the top of the wall and rip their flag off wins the Inferno.
  - Played by: Landon vs. Dan
- Spinner: Each player will be strapped to a giant wheel and will be spun at different speeds. The player that holds on to their team flag the longest wins the Inferno.
  - Played by: Tonya vs. Shavonda

== Game summary ==
Episode		Gender	Winners	Life Shield		Inferno selections		Inferno game	Inferno outcome	
#	Challenge	Gender	Winners	Good Guys	Bad Asses	Good Guys	Bad Asses	Inferno game	Winner	Eliminated
1	Surf Torture	Male	Bad Asses			Mike	Dan			
2	Juice It Up	Male	Bad Asses	Mike	CT	Jon		Hang Tough	Dan	Jon
3	X Marks the Spot	Female	Bad Asses			Robin	Tina			
4	Run For Your Money	Female	Good Guys	Mike	Derrick			Shack Attack	Tina	Robin
5	Shirt Off My Back	Male	Good Guys			Mike	Karamo			
6	Dodge Yer Balls	Male	Bad Asses	Landon	CT	Landon		Knock Your Block Off	Landon	Karamo
7	Fill In The Gaps	Female	Bad Asses			Jodi	Veronica			
8	Zip Up	Female	Good Guys	Landon	CT			That's A Wrap	Veronica	Jodi
9	Never Ending Climb	Male	Good Guys			Mike	Abram			
10	What A Drag	Male	Bad Asses	Mike	CT	Brad		Balls In	Abram	Brad
11	Riddle Me This	Female	Good Guys			Julie	Tonya			
12	Time To Ride	Female	Bad Asses	Landon	Derrick			Patchwork	Tonya	Julie
13	If Memory Serves	Male	Good Guys			Landon	Dan			
14	Crab Grab	Male	Good Guys	Darrell	CT			Pegged	Landon	Dan
15	Heart Rate Bungee	Female	Good Guys			Shavonda	Tonya			
15	Heart Rate Bungee	Female	Good Guys	Landon	CT			Spinner	Tonya	Shavonda
16	Montezuma's Revenge	—N/a	Good Guys							

=== Elimination progress ===
Contestants	Episode															
Contestants	1	2	3	4	5	6	7	8	9	10	11	12	13	14	15	Finale
Darrell	SAFE	SAFE	SAFE	SAFE	SAFE	SAFE	SAFE	SAFE	SAFE	SAFE	SAFE	SAFE	SAFE	WON	SAFE	WINNER
Jamie	SAFE	SAFE	SAFE	SAFE	SAFE	SAFE	SAFE	SAFE	SAFE	SAFE	SAFE	SAFE	SAFE	SAFE	SAFE	WINNER
Landon	SAFE	SAFE	SAFE	SAFE	SAFE	VOL	SAFE	WON	SAFE	SAFE	SAFE	WON	NOM	ELIM	WON	WINNER
Mike	NOM	WIN	SAFE	WON	NOM	SAVE	SAFE	SAFE	NOM	WIN	SAFE	SAFE	SAFE	SAFE	SAFE	WINNER
Abram	SAFE	SAFE	SAFE	SAFE	SAFE	SAFE	SAFE	SAFE	NOM	ELIM	SAFE	SAFE	SAFE	SAFE	SAFE	LOSER
CT	SAFE	WON	SAFE	SAFE	SAFE	WON	SAFE	WON	SAFE	WON	SAFE	SAFE	SAFE	WON	WON	LOSER
Derrick	SAFE	SAFE	SAFE	WON	SAFE	SAFE	SAFE	SAFE	SAFE	SAFE	SAFE	WON	SAFE	SAFE	SAFE	LOSER
Rachel	SAFE	SAFE	SAFE	SAFE	SAFE	SAFE	SAFE	SAFE	SAFE	SAFE	SAFE	SAFE	SAFE	SAFE	SAFE	LOSER
Tina	SAFE	SAFE	NOM	ELIM	SAFE	SAFE	SAFE	SAFE	SAFE	SAFE	SAFE	SAFE	SAFE	SAFE	SAFE	LOSER
Tonya	SAFE	SAFE	SAFE	SAFE	SAFE	SAFE	SAFE	SAFE	SAFE	SAFE	NOM	ELIM	SAFE	SAFE	ELIM	LOSER
Veronica	SAFE	SAFE	SAFE	SAFE	SAFE	SAFE	NOM	ELIM	SAFE	SAFE	SAFE	SAFE	SAFE	SAFE	SAFE	LOSER
Shavonda	SAFE	SAFE	SAFE	SAFE	SAFE	SAFE	SAFE	SAFE	SAFE	SAFE	SAFE	SAFE	SAFE	SAFE	OUT	
Dan	NOM	ELIM	SAFE	SAFE	SAFE	SAFE	SAFE	SAFE	SAFE	SAFE	SAFE	SAFE	NOM	OUT		
Julie	SAFE	SAFE	SAFE	SAFE	SAFE	SAFE	SAFE	SAFE	SAFE	SAFE	NOM	OUT				
Brad	SAFE	SAFE	SAFE	SAFE	SAFE	SAFE	SAFE	SAFE	SAFE	OUT						
Jodi	SAFE	SAFE	SAFE	SAFE	SAFE	SAFE	NOM	OUT								
Karamo	SAFE	SAFE	SAFE	SAFE	NOM	OUT										
Beth	SAFE	SAFE	SAFE	SAFE	QUIT											
Robin	SAFE	SAFE	NOM	OUT												
Jon	SAFE	OUT														

Teams
The contestant is on the Bad Asses team
The contestant is on the Good Guys team
Competition
The contestant won the final challenge
The contestant lost the final challenge
The contestant won the Life Saver and saved themselves
The contestant won the Life Saver but did not use it
The contestant was safe from the Inferno
The contestant was selected to go into the Inferno
The contestant was saved by the Life Saver winner
The contestant was selected to go into the Inferno and won
The contestant won the Life Saver, went into the Inferno and won
The contestant lost the Inferno and was eliminated
The contestant withdrew from the competition

== Teams ==
Surf Torture (Ep. 1)
Brad & Robin	Abram & Derrick
Darrell & Jodi	Beth & Tonya
Jamie & Julie	CT & Rachel
Jon & Shavonda	Dan & Karamo
Landon & Mike	Tina & Veronica

X Marks the Spot (Ep. 3)
Julie & Robin	Dan & Tonya
Jamie & Landon	Beth & CT
Brad & Shavonda	Karamo & Tina
Darrell & Mike	Abram & Rachel

Dodge Yer Balls (Ep. 6)
Round 1		Round 2		Round 3	
Jamie	Abram	Brad	Dan	Brad	Abram
Jodi	CT	Darrell	Karamo	Darrell	CT
Julie	Derrick	Landon	Tonya	Landon	Derrick
Shavonda	Rachel	Mike	Veronica	Mike	Rachel
	Tina				Tina

Fill In the Gaps (Ep. 7)
Heat 1		Heat 2	
Darrell	Abram	Brad	CT
Julie	Dan	Jamie	Derrick
Landon	Rachel	Jodi	Tonya
Shavonda	Tina	Mike	Veronica

Heart Rate Bungee (Ep. 15)
Darrell & Landon	Abram & Rachel
Mike & Shavonda	Derrick & Tina
Jamie & Landon	Abram & Veronica
	CT & Tonya

== Episodes ==
No. overall	No. in season	Title	Original release date
123	1	"Surf Torture"	March 7, 2005
124	2	"Juice It Up"	March 14, 2005
125	3	"X Marks the Spot"	March 21, 2005
126	4	"Run for Your Money"	March 28, 2005
127	5	"Shirt Off My Back"	April 11, 2005
128	6	"Dodge Yer Balls"	April 11, 2005
129	7	"Fill In the Gaps"	April 18, 2005
130	8	"Zip Up"	April 25, 2005
131	9	"Never Ending Climb"	May 2, 2005
132	10	"What a Drag"	May 9, 2005
133	11	"Riddle Me This"	May 16, 2005
134	12	"Time to Ride"	May 23, 2005
135	13	"If Memory Serves"	May 30, 2005
136	14	"Crab Grab"	June 6, 2005
137	15	"Heart Rate Bungee"	June 13, 2005
138	16	"Montezuma's Revenge"	June 20, 2005

=== Reunion special ===
Instead of a reunion special, a wrap-up special To Hell & Back: Hot Gossip from the Inferno 2 aired on June 27, 2005.
