= Road Rules: Down Under =

- Season 6
- Starring: Chadwick Pelletier; Christina Pazsitzky; Kefla Hare; Piggy Thomas; Shayne McBride; Susie Meister
- No. of episodes: 13

Release
- Original network: MTV
- Original release: June 22 – September 7, 1998

Season chronology
- ← Previous; Road Rules: Northern Trail Next → Road Rules: Latin America

Road Rules: Down Under is the sixth season of the MTV reality television series Road Rules. It started in Hawaii with the rest of the season exclusively in Oceania. This season is often noted as Road Rules: Australia.

== Cast ==
Cast member	Age^{1}	Hometown
Chadwick Pelletier	24	Steamboat Springs, Colorado
Christina Pazsitzky	21	Los Angeles, California
Kefla Hare	23	Foley, Alabama
Bronwen "Piggy" Thomas	24	Cleveland, England
Shayne McBride	22	Alberta, Canada
Susie Meister	18	Pittsburgh, Pennsylvania

- ^Note 1: At time of filming.

== Missions ==
Episode #	Mission Name	Completed	Notes
1/2	Cliff Jumping	Completed	The six cast members arrive in Hawaii and meet each other for the first time. Dan and Tara from the previous season of Road Rules surprise them, take away their money (as per Road Rules tradition), and present their first mission: jumping off of extremely high cliffs. By jumping off of successively higher and higher cliffs, they will earn valuable money for their trip. Everyone completes the 25-foot and 35-foot-tall jumps. However, to earn extra money, the cast gets the choice of jumping off of a 45-foot-tall cliff. Piggy surprises everyone by being the only girl to join Chadwick and Shayne in the final jump. Though she initially struggles, she finally summons the bravery and makes the leap. Later, Piggy and Christina bond by discussing their relationships: Christina has had a steady boyfriend for two years, but Piggy broke up with her boyfriend right before the show (who was nearly twice her age and supporting her financially) and instead begins to develop feelings for Chadwick. Chadwick himself confesses he is still recovering from being in love with his ex-girlfriend. As the cast settles into Sydney, they head to their first mission in Australia and discover they must separate into two teams, dress in drag, and audition for a performance in a gay-themed festival. Kefla and Chadwick have severe reservations about the task. Despite her feelings for Chadwick, Piggy gets annoyed with his constant need to show off. Eventually, she sarcastically asks him to do a backflip, and he surprises her by obliging. They get into an argument, but Chadwick diffuses the tension by spontaneously performing a song for Piggy. After succeeding at the audition, the group of Chadwick, Susie, and Kefla get to perform in drag in front of a crowd of 15,000.
1/2	Frocks On The Rocks	Completed	
3	Survive Driving on Wrong Side of Road	Completed	The cast members first are given their Winnebago, then attend an Australian driving school to earn their licenses, as Australians drive on the left side of the road. Susie and Christina discover they cannot even take a driving test because they do not know how to drive stick. Kefla, Chadwick, and Shayne pass, while Piggy (who is the only cast member who has experience driving on the left side) fails, causing her embarrassment. Later, Susie and Shayne form a close bond, which includes a lot of flirting despite Susie's boyfriend back home. Their next mission brings them to a reptile park, where they initially wrangle kangaroos and koalas but later assist in "milking" deadly snakes of their venom and cleaning the cages of large pythons. The mission causes most of the cast to freak out, especially Kefla. Despite their fears, the cast successfully completes the mission and earns much-needed money. Kefla begins to emerge as the leader of the group due to his strong but personable personality.
3	Survive Deadly Snakes	Completed	
4	Aussie Fire Fighters	Completed	Piggy has trouble relating to the other cast members and expresses concern about her sensitivity and being left out. At the cast's next mission, they train with fire fighters, including a fire rescue simulation. Kefla becomes concerned due to his fear of fire, which stems from being burned as a child. Piggy notices the fire fighters giving Susie a lot of attention, and feels self-conscious. Christina faces her fear of heights in the first part of the mission, but doesn't compete in the final part due to her being ill. In the end, Kefla faces his fears and steps up as a leader during the mission, while Piggy is the one who ends up freaking out. Despite her breakdown, the teamwork during the mission causes Piggy to feel more a part of the group.
5	Fast Food	Completed	Chadwick receives a letter from his ex-girlfriend, which upsets him as he struggles to get over their relationship. The cast arrives at a restaurant for their next mission, and separates into two teams (Chadwick/Susie/Shayne and Christina/Piggy/Kefla) to take part in a cooking competition. They must utilize gourmet ingredients and elaborate recipes, but will do all their cooking inside the kitchen of a moving RV. Two "on-board judges" will help in deciding the winner of this mission. Timmy and Christian from the second season surprise everyone by revealing themselves as the "on-board judges". Susie, a huge Road Rules fan, obsesses over Timmy and expresses her devotion and infatuation for him. Though Christina wanted to win this mission because she hasn't won yet, she, Kefla, and Piggy decide to goof off in order to have a good time instead of focusing on winning. After the mission, Piggy flirts with Chadwick and helps him feel better about his breakup back home.
6	Uncover Alien Dirt	Completed	The group takes on a job in Noosa Heads, Queensland writing articles about people who claim to have been abducted by aliens. While interviewing the eccentric "alien abductees", the cast expresses their disbelief for the stories. During the mission, Piggy's overbearing attitude begins to get on others' nerves, especially Susie's as they struggle to write their article. Later, Piggy and Chadwick come into conflict over their competing personalities. She then chooses to alienate herself from the group when they have lunch together, prompting a discussion about her temperament. In the end, both articles are published and the cast earns desperately-needed money. Christina is happy that she finally "wins" a mission. Chadwick has a heart-to-heart with Piggy and brings up the issues expressed by the other cast members, which upsets her.
7	Splash Test Dummies	Completed	A night out at the club causes a humorous situation for Kefla as an old woman hits on him. Piggy begins to have issues with Christina, who she feels she bonded with initially yet now constantly disregards her. The cast's next mission is to play the "victim" for a lifeguard competition. Christina's flirting during the mission annoys Piggy. However, Christina is happy about her performance in this mission, and the cast earns their next paycheck and a couple nights in a villa. Christina confronts Piggy about the tension between them and the conversation leads to apologies on both sides. Piggy finds out she must retake her driving exam and Chadwick helps her practice. Though she struggles, she does indeed obtain her Australian license.
8	Teachers for a Day	Completed	Kefla begins to feel separated from the group and isolated in Australia as a black person in a mostly-white country. He also criticizes Piggy, who is biracial, for not embracing her blackness. However, Piggy reveals her identity issues regarding being biracial. The cast receives their next clue, which mentions teaching in an Aboriginal community, and travels to Woorabinda, Queensland. Along the way, the cast tries to teach naive Susie about Native Americans. The destitute state of the Woorabinda community shocks the cast, but Kefla feels at home. However, looking at the curriculum the kids are supposed to learn, Kefla becomes upset and claims the information (about American Thanksgiving) is not relevant to young Aboriginals in Australia. Chadwick comes in conflict with Kefla about bringing race up. The cast instantly bonds with the children and their teaching session goes off successfully, with Kefla especially shining. Piggy leaves feeling more attached to her black roots.
9	Croc Catchers	Completed	The cast begins to notice Susie breaking away from her conservative upbringing and becoming more rebellious, first by stealing a pair of bowling shoes and later by dying her hair. For their next mission, the cast members arrive at a crocodile farm where Shayne is immediately hesitant about their job. Their first task is to hatch baby crocodiles and wash them; later they must catch juveniles with their bare hands and six-footers with the help of ropes. Everyone has trouble dealing with the feisty reptiles, although Kefla shows bravery while Shayne continues to be fearful. Another task involves sexing the crocodiles by sticking a finger up their cloaca; Kefla humorously uses a condom to do so. Their final task involves transporting the largest crocodile in the farm to a new enclosure. After completing their tasks, the cast earns money. Susie continues to rebel by getting a tattoo of a butterfly, which she claims is symbolic for her leaving her family and growing up.
10	Survive Haunted Motel	Completed	While driving through a gas station, Piggy takes out another car's taillight. Susie initially is the one who ends up dealing with the insurance and the other driver; later, however, she attempts to steal a different car's taillight instead of paying for the damages. The cast arrives at a supposedly haunted motel for their next mission; Kefla and Piggy are randomly chosen to not stay in the haunted room, to their relief. As the ghost apparently likes the windows to be open, Chadwick tapes them shut before going to bed; in the morning, they are open. The cast also leaves out a container of toothpaste and in the morning, the container is outside with the toothpaste squirted out. During the mission, Susie swears loudly and Christina comments on Susie's "downward spiral". Later, Piggy must pay for the repairs on the car she hit, leaving her devastated at having so little money left.
11	Aussie Rules pt. 1	Completed	The cast leaves their Winnebago and travels to Melbourne, where they learn they will be playing Australian rules football for their next mission. An all star team of former Road Rulers consisting of Emily (season two), Chris and Belou (Europe), Oscar (Islands), and Dan and Roni (Northern Trail) surprise the cast as their opponents. Kefla and Roni share a mutual attraction, as do Christina and Oscar. Susie and Piggy vie for the affection of their Australian coach, but Piggy gets jealous when he is more interested in Susie. As the game begins, the audience cheers on Susie especially. The episode ends as Piggy is tackled roughly by Chris.
12	Aussie Rules pt. 2	Completed	The Australian rules football game continues between the all star team and the Road Rules 6 team. The battle is very close, with notable moments including Dan's boxer shorts falling off, Piggy tackling Emily, and Chadwick and Shayne trying to distract Roni by mooning her. In the last minute, Dan wins the game for the all star team. Piggy continues to get jealous when Susie gets their Australian coach, Shane's, phone number. Later, Chris discovers he fractured his wrist. The flirtation between Kefla and Roni and Christina and Oscar gets more intense. Despite Piggy's initial jealousy, she later helps Susie try to go on a date with Shane. After having dinner and going out with the entire cast, Shane and Susie end up kissing, exciting the rest of the cast.
13	Skydive to Handsome Reward	Completed	As the cast prepares to leave Australia, the girls get annoyed with the boys for their lack of emotions regarding their pending departure. They especially note Kefla's closed-off attitude throughout the whole trip. The cast dresses up and has dinner at a fancy restaurant, where they discuss aspects of their trip such as Piggy and Chadwick's love-hate relationship and Kefla's separation from the group. Christina in particular becomes annoyed with Kefla's indifference and angrily confronts him, though they eventually make up. Piggy and Chadwick have a conversation reflecting upon the lessons they learned from each other. The cast arrives for their final mission, skydiving. Everyone successfully completes the mission and earns their handsome reward, a choice between a motorbike, motorcycle, or jetski.

== Episodes ==
No. overall	No. in season	Title	Original release date
75	1	"Clip a Koala to Your Collar"	June 22, 1998
76	2	"Clip a Koala to Your Collar"	June 22, 1998
77	3	"Got Milk?"	June 29, 1998
78	4	"Where's There's Smoke, There's a Mission"	July 6, 1998
79	5	"Fast Food Drive Through"	July 13, 1998
80	6	"Aliens Abduct Road Rulers!"	July 20, 1998
81	7	"How Not to Drown in the Ocean of Piggy Tension!"	July 27, 1998
82	8	"Teaching to Learn"	August 3, 1998
83	9	"Croc Farming and Susie Blossoming"	August 10, 1998
84	10	"A Ghost Thrives Better Than Piggy Drives"	August 17, 1998
85	11	"An Order of Footie With a Side of Flirting"	August 24, 1998
86	12	"Australian Rules Romance"	August 31, 1998
87	13	"End of the Road"	September 7, 1998

== After filming ==
The cast competed against The Real World: Seattle in Seattle for AquaGames, a face-off similar to The Challenge.

Susie returned to the series as part of the alumni cast of Road Rules 2007: Viewers' Revenge. In 2009, while filming season 18 of The Challenge, she met Adam Butler, who then worked as a crew member. The couple ended up getting married and has now a son. On September 8, 2015, Meister and Sarah Rice from The Real World: Brooklyn released their first episode of The Brain Candy Podcast. The podcast is part of Wave Podcast Network co-created by Susie and her husband.

In 2008, Christina Pazsitzky married Tom Segura. Together they have two children: Ellis (born in 2016) and Julian (born in 2018).Christina has also achieved the titles of, Main Mommy, Water Champ, and Personality Champ.

Chadwick Pelletier married Road Rules: Maximum Velocity Tour cast member Holly Brentson.

=== The Challenge ===
Cast member	Seasons of The Challenge	Other appearances
Chadwick Pelletier	Battle of the Seasons (2002)	—N/a
Christina Pazsitzky	Battle of the Sexes	—N/a
Kefla Hare	Challenge	The Challenge: All Stars (season 4)
Bronwen "Piggy" Thomas	Challenge 2000, Battle of the Seasons (2002)	—N/a
Shayne McBride	—N/a	—N/a
Susie Meister	Extreme Challenge, The Gauntlet 2, The Inferno 3, The Ruins	Spring Break Challenge
