= Real World/Road Rules Challenge: Battle of the Sexes =

6th season of the reality television series

Battle of the Sexes
- Season 6
- Presented by: Jonny Moseley
- No. of contestants: 36
- Winners: Colin Mortensen; Jamie Murray; Mark Long
- Location: Montego Bay, Jamaica
- Opening theme: "Let Go" by Midtown
- No. of episodes: 18 + Reunion and casting special

Release
- Original network: MTV
- Original release: January 6 – May 12, 2003

Season chronology
- ← Previous; Battle of the Seasons Next → The Gauntlet

Real World/Road Rules Challenge: Battle of the Sexes is the sixth season of the MTV reality game show, The Challenge (at the time known as Real World/Road Rules Challenge). The season is directly subsequent to the first Battle of the Seasons. Battle of the Sexes featured cast members from The Real World and Road Rules. The cast stayed in the Round Hill Hotel and Villas Resort near Montego Bay, Jamaica. A casting special, Battle of the Sexes: The Good, the Bad, and the Notorious, was aired on December 30, 2002. The show premiered on January 6, 2003 and concluded on May 12, 2003.

This is the first edition of the Battle of the Sexes series, with Battle of the Sexes 2 following in 2004–2005.

== Format ==
This season of the Real World/Road Rules Challenge features the same format as Battle of the Seasons, but instead of dividing teams by Real World and Road Rules teams, they are instead divided by gender. Each mission gave points based on finish, either with a partner or individually. After each mission, the players with the most points cumulative from each team became the "Inner Circle" and voted off whoever they wanted to. The winner of each challenge would earn a "lifesaver" which could be given to a member of either team; the recipient of the "lifesaver" would enjoy total immunity from being voted out, which created many interesting situations. After thirty people were voted off, fifteen for both genders, the final three Girls and final three Guys would compete against each other in a final race, earning $150,000 for themselves, $50,000 per teammate.

== Contestants ==
Male contestants	Original season	Finish
Mark Long	Road Rules: USA – The First Adventure	Winner
Colin Mortensen	The Real World: Hawaii	Winner
Jamie Murray	The Real World: New Orleans	Winner
Antoine de Bouverie	Road Rules: Europe	Episode 17
Shane Landrum	Road Rules: Campus Crawl	Episode 16
James Orlando	Road Rules: Maximum Velocity Tour	Episode 15
Eric Nies	The Real World: New York	Episode 14
Blair Herter	Road Rules: The Quest	Episode 13
Syrus Yarbrough	The Real World: Boston	Episode 12
Theo Gantt	The Real World: Chicago	Episode 11
Jake Bronstein	Road Rules: Islands	Episode 10 (Note: Jake quit the game in Episode 10, citing personal reasons. The Inner Circle agreed and voted him off officially.)
Dan Renzi	The Real World: Miami	Episode 9 (Note: Dan was originally voted off in Episode 8. However, when Puck quit the game, Dan was brought back because the teams needed to have the same number of players.)
David "Puck" Rainey	The Real World: San Francisco	Episode 8
Yes Duffy	Road Rules: Semester at Sea	Episode 7
David Broom	The Real World: New Orleans	Episode 5
Eric Jones	Road Rules: Campus Crawl	Episode 4
Laterrian Wallace	Road Rules: Maximum Velocity Tour	Episode 3
David Edwards	The Real World: Los Angeles	Episode 1 (Note: David E. quit the game on the first episode after coming into conflict with Puck, who had suggested David to be eliminated by the Inner Circle. David, who was already offended by Puck spitting on him, chose to leave the game.)

Female contestants	Original season	Finish
Ruthie Alcaide	The Real World: Hawaii	Runner-up
Ellen Cho	Road Rules: The Quest	Runner-up
Lori Trespicio	The Real World: Back to New York	Runner-up
Melissa Howard	The Real World: New Orleans	Episode 17
Genesis Moss	The Real World: Boston	Episode 16
Emily Bailey	Road Rules: USA – The Second Adventure	Episode 15 (Note: Emily quit the game in Episode 15 because she did not want to participate in the game without her boyfriend James, who was just voted off by the Inner Circle. Genesis, who was originally voted off, was not eliminated and Lori, who had the fourth highest score was automatically put in the Inner Circle.)
Anne Wharton	Road Rules: Northern Trail	Episode 14
Ayanna Mackins	Road Rules: Semester at Sea	Episode 13
Veronica Portillo	Road Rules: Semester at Sea	Episode 12
Christina Pazsitzky	Road Rules: Down Under	Episode 11
Tonya Cooley	The Real World: Chicago	Episode 10
Aneesa Ferreira	The Real World: Chicago	Episode 9
Rachel Robinson	Road Rules: Campus Crawl	Episode 8
Amaya Brecher	The Real World: Hawaii	Episode 7
Jisela Delgado	Road Rules: The Quest	Episode 5
Gladys Sanabria	Road Rules: Latin America	Episode 4
Beth Stolarczyk	The Real World: Los Angeles	Episode 3
Julie Stoffer	The Real World: New Orleans	Episode 2

== Game summary ==
Episode		Winners		Life Saver Recipient	Inner Circle	Eliminated
#	Challenge	Team	Life Saver	Life Saver Recipient	Inner Circle	Eliminated
1/2	Sergeant Says	Women	Amaya, Melissa	Dan	Blair, Colin, Jamie, Theo	—N/a
1/2	Sergeant Says	Women	Amaya, Melissa	Dan	Amaya, Aneesa, Genesis, Melissa	Julie
3	Dead Man's Drop	Women	Ruthie	Gladys	Anne, Ellen, Ruthie	Beth
3	Dead Man's Drop	Women	Ruthie	Gladys	Colin, Jamie, Theo	Laterrian
4	Tree House	Men	Dan, Jamie	Puck	Anne, Ellen, Ruthie	Gladys
4	Tree House	Men	Dan, Jamie	Puck	Colin, Jamie, Puck	Eric J.
5	Breath-Hold Bungee	Men	James	Emily	Colin, James, Jamie	David B.
5	Breath-Hold Bungee	Men	James	Emily	Ellen, Ruthie, Veronica	Jisela
7	Seven Rings of Saturn	Men	Puck, Theo	Colin	Ellen, Emily, Ruthie	Amaya
7	Seven Rings of Saturn	Men	Puck, Theo	Colin	Colin, Jamie, Mark	Yes
8	Freeze Your Butt Off	Women	Ellen	Tonya	Colin, Mark, Theo	Dan
8	Freeze Your Butt Off	Women	Ellen	Tonya	Ellen, Emily, Ruthie	Rachel
9	People Mover	Women	Ayanna, Ellen	Tonya	Colin, Jamie, Mark	Dan
9	People Mover	Women	Ayanna, Ellen	Tonya	Ellen, Emily, Ruthie	Aneesa
10	Battle of the Opposite Sexes	Men	Jake	Blair	Ellen, Ruthie, Veronica	Tonya
10	Battle of the Opposite Sexes	Men	Jake	Blair	Colin, Jamie, Mark	Jake
11	Leaky River	Men	Eric N.	—N/a (Note: Eric N. dedicated the lifesaver to his sister, who was in the hospital with an over-100 degree fever. The lifesaver was not used to save a contestant, which was allowed in the game.)	Ellen, Melissa, Ruthie	Christina
11	Leaky River	Men	Eric N.	—N/a	Colin, Jamie, Mark	Theo
12	Stairway to Heaven	Men	Jamie	Blair (Note: Jamie did inform Jonny of who he was giving the life saver to prior to the elimination. After Veronica was eliminated, he said that he was about to give it to Blair but then gave it to Veronica. Since Jonny was never informed and Jamie made it clear that he changed his mind after the elimination, his original selection of Blair had to stay, thereby eliminating Veronica.)	Colin, Jamie, Mark	Syrus
12	Stairway to Heaven	Men	Jamie	Blair	Ellen, Emily, Ruthie	Veronica
13	Collision Course	Men	James	Blair (Note: Blair refused the lifesaver in Episode 13 because he felt that he did not deserve to stay over the other Men who had scored higher than him on the scoreboard.)	Ellen, Emily, Ruthie	Ayanna
13	Collision Course	Men	James	Blair	Colin, Jamie, Mark	Blair
14	Spider Mon	Men	Shane	Genesis	Colin, Jamie, Mark	Eric N.
14	Spider Mon	Men	Shane	Genesis	Ellen, Emily, Ruthie	Anne
15	Human Aquarium	Men	Antoine	Shane	Ellen, Emily, Ruthie	Genesis
15	Human Aquarium	Men	Antoine	Shane	Colin, Jamie, Mark	James
16	Razors Edge	Men	Antoine	Shane (Note: Shane refused the lifesaver in Episode 16 because he did not want Antoine to give up his spot in the final four.)	Ellen, Lori, Ruthie	Genesis
16	Razors Edge	Men	Antoine	Shane	Colin, Jamie, Mark	Shane
17	Maximum Velocity	Women	Ruthie	—N/a	Ellen, Lori, Ruthie	Melissa
17	Maximum Velocity	Women	Ruthie	—N/a	Colin, Jamie, Mark	Antoine
18	It Takes Three	**Men**	—N/a			

=== Scoreboard ===
Players	Episodes															
Players	1/2	3	4	5	7	8	9	10	11	12	13	14	15	16	17	Finale
Mark	16	45	71	102	**136**	**160**	**188**	**220**	**250**	**284**	**314**	**344**	**376**	**410**	**441**	WINNER
Colin	**28**	**59**	**93**	**115**	**149**	**168**	**200**	**223**	**251**	**279**	**310**	**345**	**372**	**404**	**439**	WINNER
Jamie	**28**	**51**	**87**	**115**	**141**	155	**183**	**213**	**238**	**274**	**308**	**339**	**372**	**407**	**407**	WINNER
Ruthie	28	**64**	**72**	**102**	**134**	**163**	**189**	**210**	**244**	**274**	**300**	**334**	**365**	**365**	**401**	LOSER
Ellen	26	**58**	**64**	**87**	**109**	**145**	**181**	**216**	**240**	**264**	**290**	**318**	**347**	**347**	**378**	LOSER
Lori	22	36	50	63	93	123	147	177	203	227	254	281	309	**342**	**376**	LOSER
Antoine	2	36	58	90	118	129	163	193	225	258	287	319	355	391	391	
Melissa	**36**	47	61	70	92	125	155	188	**208**	227	227	253	278	309	341	
Shane	12	38	66	100	128	145	167	197	220	247	279	315	349	349		
Genesis	**34**	43	55	65	89	114	140	174	197	218	218	218	248	248		
Emily	2	37	61	85	**117**	**151**	**169**	169	202	**233**	**262**	**291**	**317**			
James	8	35	67	**103**	103	121	155	185	213	245	281	314	349			
Anne	24	**52**	**62**	79	103	135	153	153	175	196	220	245				
Eric N.	10	40	66	99	99	127	159	191	227	262	297	297				
Blair	**32**	39	61	79	99	121	141	171	196	225	259					
Ayanna	6	25	45	61	91	126	162	162	193	215	215					
Veronica	28	45	61	**88**	106	137	167	**197**	197	222						
Syrus	18	41	71	91	117	133	147	177	198	224						
Theo	**32**	**50**	68	94	130	**156**	170	194	194							
Christina	24	37	61	69	69	92	116	116	116							
Jake	20	28	60	95	115	136	158	194								
Tonya	22	46	52	64	64	84	100	100								
Aneesa	**34**	46	56	67	67	79	95									
Dan	20	40	76	101	101	116	136									
Puck	16	49	**77**	98	134	147	147									
Rachel	2	17	37	56	74	101										
Yes	8	31	65	94	94											
Amaya	**36**	41	57	71	71											
Jisela	14	30	42	49												
David B.	18	43	61	76												
Eric J.	12	25	55													
Gladys	14	14	22													
Latterian	2	8														
Beth	6	16														
Julie	26															
David E.	10															

Competition
Bold indicates the contestants in the Inner Circle
The contestant's team won the final challenge
The contestant's team did not win the final challenge
The contestant came in first in the challenge, won the Life Saver, and a prize
The contestant was given the Life Saver by the winner of the challenge
The contestant was safe from elimination
The contestant was eliminated but was saved by the Life Saver
The contestant was eliminated
The contestant refused the Life Saver and was eliminated
The contestant came in first in the challenge, won the Life Saver, won a prize and was eliminated
The contestant quit the game

== Teams ==
Sergeant Says (Ep. 1/2)
Amaya & Melissa	Antoine & Latterrian
Aneesa & Genesis	Blair & Theo
Anne & Christina	Colin & Jamie
Ayanna & Beth	Dan & Jake
Ellen & Julie	David B. & Syrus
Emily & Rachel	David E. & Eric N.
Gladys & Jisela	Eric J. & Shane
Lori & Tonya	James & Yes
Ruthie & Veronica	Mark & Puck

Tree House (Ep. 4)
Amaya & Veronica	Antoine & Blair
Aneesa & Anne	Colin & Yes
Ayanna & Rachel	Dan & Jamie
Christina & Emily	David B. & Theo
Ellen & Tonya	Eric J. & Syrus
Genesis & Jisela	Eric N. & Mark
Gladys & Ruthie	Jake & James
Lori & Melissa	Puck & Shane

Seven Rings of Saturn (Ep. 7)
Amaya & Tonya	Antoine & Shane
Anne & Genesis	Blair & Jake
Aneesa & Christina	Colin & Mark
Ayanna & Lori	Dan & James
Ellen & Melissa	Eric N. & Yes
Emily & Ruthie	Jamie & Syrus
Rachel & Veronica	Puck & Theo

People Mover (Ep. 9)
Aneesa & Tonya	Antoine & James
Anne & Emily	Blair & Dan
Ayanna & Ellen	Colin & Eric N.
Christina & Lori	Jamie & Mark
Genesis & Ruthie	Jake & Shane
Melissa & Veronica	Syrus & Theo

== Episodes ==
No. overall	No. in season	Title	Original release date
55	1	"Hola Jamaica"	January 6, 2003
56	2	"Sargeant Says"	January 6, 2003
57	3	"Dead Man's Drop"	January 13, 2003
58	4	"Tree House"	January 20, 2003
59	5	"Breath-Hold Bungee"	January 27, 2003
60	6	"Puck's Wedding"	February 3, 2003
61	7	"Seven Rings of Saturn"	February 10, 2003
62	8	"Freeze Your Butt Off"	February 17, 2003
63	9	"People Mover"	February 24, 2003
64	10	"Battle of the Opposite Sexes"	March 3, 2003
65	11	"Leaky River"	March 17, 2003
66	12	"Stairway to Heaven"	March 24, 2003
67	13	"Collision Course"	March 31, 2003
68	14	"Spider Mon"	April 7, 2003
69	15	"Human Aquarium"	April 14, 2003
70	16	"Razors Edge"	April 21, 2003
71	17	"Maximum Velocity"	April 28, 2003
72	18	"Handsome Reward"	May 5, 2003

=== Reunion special ===
The reunion special, Hot and Bothered: The Battle of the Sexes Reunion, was aired live on May 12, 2003 and was hosted by the season's host Jonny Moseley. The following week, a casting special for the then upcoming seasons of The Real World and Road Rules was aired.
