= Real World/Road Rules Extreme Challenge =

4th season of the reality television series

Extreme Challenge
- Season 4
- No. of contestants: 13
- Winners: Dan Renzi; Jamie Murray; Julie Stoffer; Kameelah Phillips; Rebecca Lord; Syrus Yarbrough
- Location: Portland; Montreal; Boston; London; Hamburg; Prague; New York City; Los Angeles
- No. of episodes: 18 (including the Reunion special)

Release
- Original network: MTV
- Original release: January 9 – May 22, 2001

Season chronology
- ← Previous; Challenge 2000 Next → Battle of the Seasons

Real World/Road Rules Extreme Challenge is the fourth season of the MTV reality game show, The Challenge (at the time known as Real World/Road Rules Challenge).

== Format ==
Extreme Challenge is the third and final six-on-six Real World/Road Rules Challenge. The cast was split up into two different six-person teams, one representing The Real World and the other representing Road Rules. The teams traveled via tour bus in the eastern U.S. and Europe competing in different challenges. Each time a team won an individual challenge, money would be added to a Monster.com team bank account. The last mission would be for the right to keep the money collected in the pot, an additional cash prize, and a car.

== Cast ==
This was the only season without a regular alumni host/presenter introducing each challenge. Instead, various alumni provided audio clues.

Real World team
Player	Original season
Dan Renzi	The Real World: Miami
Jamie Murray	The Real World: New Orleans
Julie Stoffer	The Real World: New Orleans
Kameelah Phillips	The Real World: Boston
Rebecca Lord	The Real World: Seattle
Syrus Yarbrough	The Real World: Boston

Road Rules team
Player	Original season
Ayanna Mackins (Note: Susie replaced Ayanna in Episode 7 when the teams arrived in Boston. Ayanna physically attacked Christian in the Road Rules bus after Christian made a joke to Laterrian that Ayanna perceived to be racist. Though the cameras did not capture the incident, and Christian did not want to send Ayanna home, the producers asked Ayanna to leave in episode 6. Susie replaced Ayanna when their casts received their next clue at the Real World: Boston house. The Road Rules team later admitted on the reunion that Ayanna was a more valuable physical asset than Susie.)	Road Rules: Semester at Sea
Christian Breivik	Road Rules: USA – The Second Adventure
Emily Bailey	Road Rules: USA – The Second Adventure
James Orlando	Road Rules: Maximum Velocity Tour
Laterrian Wallace	Road Rules: Maximum Velocity Tour
Michelle Parma	Road Rules: Europe
Susie Meister	Road Rules: Down Under

== Game summary ==
Episodes		Mission outcome		Mission MVP	Wheel of Good Stuff
#	Challenge	Winners	Losers	Mission MVP	Wheel of Good Stuff
1	Ring of Fire	Real World	Road Rules	—N/a	
1	Rope Courses	Road Rules	Real World	—N/a	
2	Blimp Water Skiing	Real World	Road Rules	Julie	Jeep Products
3	Fisherman's Wharf	Real World	Road Rules	Kameelah	Fujifilm
4	No Laughing Matter	Real World	Road Rules	Syrus	"Gimme Your Stuff"
5	Rollerball Resurrection	Road Rules	Real World	Christian	Dreamcast
7	Wrestling with the Past	Road Rules	Real World	James	Auto Video Products
9	Sub-Standard	Real World	Road Rules	Syrus	Sea-Doo Watercraft
10	Bring It On	Road Rules	Real World	Emily	"Gimme Your Stuff"
11	Breath-Taking	Road Rules	Real World	Christian	Dreamcast
12	Tough Guy	Real World	Road Rules	Dan	iOmega MP3
13	Defying Gravity	Real World	Road Rules	Rebecca	Palm Pilot
14	Famous Couples Fashion Show	Real World	Road Rules	Jamie	"Gimme Your Stuff"
15	Gross Out Games	Real World	Road Rules	Julie	Buell Blast Motorcycle
15/16	Operation Human Shield (Note: In episode 15, a dispute over the Operation Human Shield mission caused an intense argument between James and Syrus. Neither team was awarded $10,000 at the end of that mission, but in episode 16, both teams got the chance to defend their actions in court on the set of Judge Mills Lane. Road Rules, with the exception of Laterrian, decides not to participate, so the judge, Mills Lane, granted the money to the Real World, although he acknowledged Laterrian for his admirable defense.)	Real World	Road Rules	—N/a (Note: Laterrian was honored by the judge and received a small gavel as a token, but there was no official MVP for this mission.)	
16	Toyota Motosports	Real World	Road Rules	—N/a	
17	Race to the Finish	Real World	Road Rules	—N/a	

Real World
Road Rules

Episode		Mission outcome		Prize
#	Challenge	Winners	Losers	Prize
8	Human Foosball (Note: In Episode 8, the mission had the contestants compete with three Real World cast members and three Road Rules cast members on two different teams. The Yellow team consisting of Christian, Dan, Emily, James, Julie, and Rebecca won the mission and were awarded with $1,000 in cash for each of them.)	Yellow Team	Black Team	$6,000

Yellow Team
Black Team

=== Final results ===
- Real World won the final challenge, winning brand new Toyota Celicas. They earned $110,000 with each team member receiving $18,833. For winning the "Human Foosball" mini-challenge, Dan, Julie, and Rebecca received an additional $1,000 for a total of $19,833.
- Road Rules lost the final challenge, therefore losing their entire bank. For winning the "Human Foosball" mini-challenge, Christian, Emily, and James received an additional $1,000.

== Teams ==
Rope Course (Ep.2)
Laterrian & Ayanna
Jamie & Kameelah

Human Foosball (Ep. 8)
Yellow Team	Black Team
James	Jamie
Christian	Syrus
Dan	Laterrian
Emily	Kameelah
Julie	Michelle
Rebecca	Susie

Famous Couples Fashion Show (Ep. 14)
Christian & Laterrian	Dan & Syrus
James & Emily	Kameelah & Rebecca
Michelle & Susie	Jamie & Julie

Toyota Motosports (Ep. 17)
Laterrian & Emily
Jamie & Syrus

== Memorable moments ==
- The episode entitled "Couple Fashion Show" featured both teams having to dress up as famous duos in a fetish club. This episode has never been aired following its original air date, for reasons that remain unknown.

== Episodes ==
No. overall	No. in season	Title	Original release date
23	1	"A Challenging Decision"	January 9, 2001
24	2	"Blimp Water-Skiing"	January 16, 2001
25	3	"Budding Romance"	January 23, 2001
26	4	"No Laughing Matter"	January 30, 2001
27	5	"Rollerball Resurrection"	February 6, 2001
28	6	"Ayanna's Departure"	February 13, 2001
29	7	"Wrestling with the Past"	February 20, 2001
30	8	"Love and Foosball"	February 27, 2001
31	9	"Yes Sir...I Mean, Yes Ma'am!"	March 6, 2001
32	10	"Leader of the Pack"	March 13, 2001
33	11	"The Scariest Mission of All Time"	March 20, 2001
34	12	"Tough Love"	March 27, 2001
35	13	"Grudge Match"	April 3, 2001
36	14	"Good Intentions"	April 10, 2001
37	15	"Downward Spiral"	April 17, 2001
38	16	"True to Himself"	April 24, 2001
39	17	"Race to the Finish"	May 1, 2001

=== Reunion special ===
The reunion special, Real World/Road Rules Extreme Challenge: Cease Fire, aired after the season finale and was attended by the entire cast. It was hosted by Melissa Howard from The Real World: New Orleans and Mark Long from Road Rules: USA – The First Adventure.
