= The Challenge: All Stars season 1 =

The Challenge: All Stars
- Season 1
- Presented by: T. J. Lavin
- No. of contestants: 22
- Winner: Yes Duffy
- Location: Andes Mountains, Argentina
- No. of episodes: 10 (including the Reunion special)

Release
- Original network: Paramount+
- Original release: April 1 – June 3, 2021

Season chronology
- Next → Season 2

The first season of The Challenge: All Stars premiered on Paramount+ on April 1, 2021. The season featured twenty-two cast members from The Real World, Road Rules and The Challenge competing for $500,000.

== Format ==
The first season of The Challenge: All Stars features a daily challenge, nomination process and an elimination round.

- Daily Challenge: Players compete in the main challenge either individually or in teams. For team challenges, teams elect a male and female captain before the challenge begins. The winning player (for individual challenges), or winning captain (for team challenges) of the designated gender is immune from elimination while the respective losing captain or player of the designated gender is automatically sent into the elimination round.
- Nominations: Players besides the captains of the winning and losing teams (for team challenges), or both individual winners and the last-place player (for individual challenges), participate in nominations to select a second player of the designated gender to compete in the elimination round. They are given a chance to discuss the nominations before voting in an open vote. The player who receives the most votes participates in the elimination round.
- Eliminations (The Arena): The nominated player participates in an elimination round against the same-gender captain of the losing team, or the last place player from the daily challenge depending on the structure of the daily challenge. The winner remains in the game while the loser is eliminated.

Starting at the 5th episode, it was announced that the remaining eliminations for the season would be double eliminations in which two players are eliminated. The losing male and female players, or captains, from the daily challenge form a team. The nominated player must then call-out a partner of the opposite gender to form their opponents for the elimination; the gender of the nominated player alternates each episode. The winning team remains in the game while the losing team is eliminated.

Twists

- Lifesaver: Implemented for the first four episodes, the winning player or winning team captain of the non-designated gender for the elimination round is granted the Lifesaver. At the Arena, they must choose whether or not to use the Lifesaver to save the nominated player from competing in the elimination. In the event that the Lifesaver is used, the players eligible to vote (this time excluding the saved nominee) must publicly vote to select a replacement nominee for the Arena.

== Contestants ==
Male contestants	Original season	Finish (Note: Only the winner, runner-up and third-place players were announced at the conclusion of the Final Challenge. However, the points and rankings of the remaining finalists could still be tabulated and is thus reflected in the overall results.)
Yes Duffy	Road Rules: Semester at Sea	Winner
Darrell Taylor	Road Rules: Campus Crawl	Runner-up
Mark Long	Road Rules: USA – The First Adventure	Fifth place
Alton Williams	The Real World: Las Vegas (2002)	Sixth place
Eric "Big Easy" Banks	Real World/Road Rules Challenge: Fresh Meat	Tenth place
Derrick Kosinski	Road Rules: X-Treme	Eleventh place
Nehemiah Clark	The Real World: Austin	Episode 7
Laterrian Wallace	Road Rules: Maximum Velocity Tour	Episode 6
Syrus Yarbrough	The Real World: Boston	Episode 5
Tecumshea "Teck" Holmes	The Real World: Hawaii	Episode 3
Ace Amerson	The Real World: Paris	Episode 1

Female contestants	Original season	Finish
Jonna Mannion	The Real World: Cancun	Third place
KellyAnne Judd	The Real World: Sydney	Third place
Jemmye Carroll	The Real World: New Orleans (2010)	Seventh place
Ruthie Alcaide	The Real World: Hawaii	Seventh place
Aneesa Ferreira	The Real World: Chicago	Ninth place
Jisela Delgado	Road Rules: The Quest	Eleventh place
Kendal Darnell	Road Rules: Campus Crawl	Episode 7
Katie Cooley	Road Rules: The Quest	Episode 6
Beth Stolarczyk	The Real World: Los Angeles	Episode 5
Arissa Hill	The Real World: Las Vegas (2002)	Episode 4 (Note: Arissa was voted to participate in the "Wall Ball" elimination against Beth following the episode 4 re-vote. However, prior to the start of the elimination, she withdrew from the competition due to her discontempt with being voted in. Beth was declared the winner by default.)
Trishelle Cannatella	The Real World: Las Vegas (2002)	Episode 2

=== Casting ===
Several potential cast members were asked to appear with some being chosen as alternates and flown out to Argentina for the entirety of production. Alternates included Casey Cooper and Ryan Kehoe from Real World/Road Rules Challenge: Fresh Meat, Sophia Pasquis from Road Rules: The Quest, Heather Cooke from 2011's The Real World: Las Vegas, and Cohutta Grindstaff from The Real World: Sydney.

== Gameplay ==
=== Challenge games ===
- Deep Blue Dive: Played in two teams of eleven, teams solve a series of math equations one at a time. After solving an equation, one player must swim and dive to collect a cubic puzzle piece with the answer printed on it. Teams continue this process until they collect all eleven puzzle pieces, and each team player must enter the water at least once. If a player is unable to collect a puzzle piece, or collects an incorrect puzzle piece, their team is assigned a five-minute penalty and another player must collect the puzzle piece instead. The first team to collect all eleven puzzle pieces and solve the final equation wins.
  - Winners: Arissa, Beth, Big Easy, Darrell, Jemmye, Jisela, Kendal, Nehemiah, Teck, Trishelle & Yes
- Ancient Challenge History: Played in male and female heats, players begin on a structure above water with three platforms in front of them. One at a time, players are asked a question about previous seasons of The Challenge. If they answer incorrectly, they must step onto the next platform. Each subsequent platform is able to withstand less weight than the previous one. Players are eliminated from the challenge if they fall through a platform that cannot withstand their weight or reach the third and final platform. The last player of each gender standing wins, while the first female to fall into the water is automatically sent into elimination.
  - Winners: Aneesa & Nehemiah
- Melt Away: Played in five teams of four, teams must use their bodies to melt through two giant blocks of ice and collect four shields frozen inside. After an extended period of time, teams are given two hammers to assist them. Teams are issued a five-minute penalty for any shields they break. Once teams collect all four shields, they return to their station to find six additional shields, each with a previous season of The Challenge printed on it. The first team to place all ten seasons in chronological order wins.
  - Winners: Darrell, KellyAnne, Kendal & Syrus (Note: The Gold Team completed the "Melt Away" challenge first however, they were retroactively issued a ten-minute penalty for breaking two shields as per the game's rules. The Silver Team finished within ten minutes of this time and, with no issued penalties, were declared the winners of the challenge)
- On the Ropes: Played in four teams of five, with two teams playing at a time. Teams begin on opposite platforms above water. Each team has a set of five ropes that connect the two platforms. One team member at a time must cross their ropes to reach the opposite platform before returning to their platform. Once back, they may unclip one of their opponent's ropes. Players are eliminated from the challenge if they fall in the water. The process continues until one team has unclipped all of their opponent's ropes. The team that unclips the most ropes the fastest wins.
  - Winners: Aneesa, Derrick, Mark, Ruthie & Yes
- Connect Em All: Beginning in three teams of six, teams complete their first checkpoint which involves solving a series of math equations, where the solutions correspond to letters that form a phrase. Once complete, teams must then carry a heavy log uphill to the second checkpoint and disband into male-female pairs. The second checkpoint requires pairs to replicate a memory board using colored tiles. Once complete, pairs disband to compete as individuals and must carry a smaller log downhill to the finish line. The first male and female player to cross the finish line wins while the last male and female player to cross the finish line are automatically sent into elimination.
  - Winners: Kendal & Laterrian
- Escape the Room: Played in four teams of four, with two teams playing at once. Teams begin in a container above water with each team member standing on a trapdoor in front of their puzzle. Each member must solve their puzzle before their trapdoor opens. At pre-determined intervals, the trapdoors open, dropping one team member into the water each time. The team with the most puzzles solved wins.
  - Winners: Big Easy, Jonna, Laterrian & Ruthie
- Rib Cage Pass: Two players at a time begin harnessed on opposite sides of a speeding truck. They must cross a series of beams attached to the truck and collect a ball at the opposite end, before returning across the beams to deposit the ball. Players continue this process until they collect all four balls or reach the time-limit. The male and female player with the most balls collected win while the male and female player with the least balls collected are automatically sent into elimination. In the event that multiple players are unable to collect a ball, the losing player is determined by the number of beams traversed.
  - Winners: KellyAnne & Mark

=== Arena games ===
- Pole Wrestle: Players begin at the center of the Arena and place both hands on a metal pole. The first player to wrestle the pole out of their opponent's hands twice wins.
  - Played by: Ace vs. Laterrian
- Knot So Fast: Players have 20 minutes to create as many knots as they can using a 200-foot rope within an octagonal structure. After those 20 minutes are up, players switch positions and must untie their opponent's knots. The first player to untie their opponent's knots and place the rope inside their circle wins.
  - Played by: Kendal vs. Trishelle
- Going out of Tile: Immediately prior to the elimination, players must consume two Carolina Reaper peppers. On T.J's go, players must run inside an open structure with tiles inserted inside of the frames. They must break all of their corresponding colored tiles, including the tiles on the roof, before returning to their starting circle. The first player to return to the start wins.
  - Played by: Nehemiah vs. Teck
- Wall Ball: Players begin with four walls connected to a rope and must pull the rope to separate the walls. Once separated, they must throw a ball over the first wall and punch their way through the wall, continuing this process with all four walls. The first player to punch through all four walls wins.
- Over and Under: Teams begin with four walls connected to a rope and must pull the rope to separate the walls. Once separated, one teammate must throw a ball over the first wall and punch their way through the walls, while their partner must climb over the walls before depositing their ball at the end. Teams repeat this process five times. The first team to deposit all five balls wins.
  - Played by: Alton & Aneesa vs. Beth & Syrus
- Pull Me Over: Team members begin on a stump across from their opponent of the same gender, with a rope in between them. They must pull their opponent off the stump, or retrieve all the rope to win their matchup. If both team members win their matchup, their team is awarded a point. The first team to two points wins.
  - Played by: Katie & Laterrian vs. Kendal & Mark
- Ring Cling: Teams must release ten rings, connected to each other by chains, from a nine-foot pole. Once released, teams attach the rings to pegs in a wall to assemble a ladder, and climb to ring the bell at the top. The first team to ring their bell wins.
  - Played by: Big Easy & Jisela vs. Kendal & Nehemiah

=== Final Challenge ===
It was announced that players would complete a series of checkpoints in male-female pairs to earn points based on their placements. The player with the greatest total points at the end of the Final Challenge is declared the winner and will receive $500,000. Additionally, the last pair to reach the second checkpoint is eliminated.

The first pair to complete each checkpoint receives 5 points each; second receives 4 points; third receives 3 points; fourth receives 2 points; fifth receives 1 point. After each checkpoint, members from the winning pair choose a player of the opposite gender (that they haven't already partnered with) as their partner for the next checkpoint. The process continues with the next-highest ranked players from the previous checkpoint choosing their teammate from the remaining unpaired players.

Day one

- Checkpoint #1: Players individually complete a triangular geometric puzzle. Once a male and female player complete their puzzle, they pair up and must paddle a canoe across a lake to the next checkpoint. The last team to reach the next checkpoint is eliminated.
  - Eliminated: Derrick & Jisela (11th place)
- Checkpoint #2 & #3 (Part 1): Teams must assemble two bicycles and, while tethered together, ride them towards a puzzle board. At the puzzle board, they must solve two pentagram-shaped puzzles so that the numbers on the five points have the same sum.
- Checkpoint #3 (Part 2): Teams must run up an elevating path while tethered together to reach the next checkpoint.
- Checkpoint #4: Each team member must consume two Carolina Reaper peppers and solve a puzzle before proceeding along a path to the next checkpoint.
- Checkpoint #5 and Overnight Stage: Each team member must consume a serving of barbecued offal to complete the checkpoint. For the Overnight Stage, players remain with their partner from Checkpoint #5. One team member may sleep at a time on the end of a large seesaw while their partner stands on the other end to level the apparatus. If the player standing falls or steps off, they must switch places with their partner.

Day two

- Final Leg (Checkpoint #6): As individuals, players must race to the top of a mountain where the finish line is located. It was announced that the checkpoint was worth "double points" where the first player to reach the top receives ten points, the second player receives nine points and so on with the tenth player receiving one point. After each player has reached the top, the results are announced. The player with the most points is declared the winner of The Challenge: All Stars and receives $500,000.
  - Winner: Yes (31 points)
  - Runner-up: Darrell (29 points)
  - Third place: Jonna and KellyAnne (24 points)
  - Fifth place: Mark (22 points)
  - Sixth place: Alton (20 points)
  - Seventh place: Jemmye and Ruthie (17 points)
  - Ninth place: Aneesa (13 points)
  - Tenth place: Big Easy (9 points)

== Game summary ==
=== Elimination chart ===
Episode		Gender	Challenge type	Winners			Arena contestants			Arena game	Arena outcome	
#	Challenge	Gender	Challenge type	Team	Immunity	Life Saver	Last-place	Voted in	Replacement	Arena game	Winner	Eliminated
1	Deep Blue Dive	Male	2 teams of 11	Silver Team	Teck	Jisela	Laterrian	Ace	—N/a	Pole Wrestle	Laterrian	Ace
2	Ancient Challenge History	Female	Individual	—N/a	Aneesa	Nehemiah	Trishelle	Kendal	—N/a	Knot So Fast	Kendal	Trishelle
3	Melt Away	Male	5 teams of 4	Silver Team	Darrell	Kendal	Nehemiah	Teck	—N/a	Going Out of Tile	Nehemiah	Teck
4	On the Ropes	Female	4 teams of 5 (Note: As the "On the Ropes" challenge was played with 19 players, the Silver Team only had four members. Therefore, Darrell was randomly selected and competed in the challenge twice.)	Gold Team	Ruthie	Mark	Beth	~~Katie~~	Arissa	Wall Ball	Beth	Arissa
#	Challenge	—N/a	Challenge type	Team	Immunity	—N/a	Last-place	Voted in	Selected	Arena game	Winner	Eliminated
5	Connect Em All	—N/a	3 teams of 6 → Male/Female Pairs → Individual	—N/a	Laterrian	—N/a	Syrus	Alton	Aneesa	Over and Under	Alton & Aneesa	Beth & Syrus
5	Connect Em All	—N/a	3 teams of 6 → Male/Female Pairs → Individual	—N/a	Kendal	—N/a	Beth	Alton	Aneesa	Over and Under	Alton & Aneesa	Beth & Syrus
6	Escape the Room	—N/a	4 teams of 4	Gold Team	Ruthie	—N/a	Kendal	Katie	Laterrian	Pull Me Over	Kendal & Mark	Katie & Laterrian
6	Escape the Room	—N/a	4 teams of 4	Gold Team	Big Easy	—N/a	Mark	Katie	Laterrian	Pull Me Over	Kendal & Mark	Katie & Laterrian
7	Rib Cage Pass	—N/a	Individual	—N/a	KellyAnne	—N/a	Jisela	Nehemiah	Kendal	Ring Cling	Big Easy & Jisela	Kendal & Nehemiah
7	Rib Cage Pass	—N/a	Individual	—N/a	Mark	—N/a	Big Easy	Nehemiah	Kendal	Ring Cling	Big Easy & Jisela	Kendal & Nehemiah
8/9	Final Challenge	—N/a	Male/Female Pairs → Individual	Yes		2nd: Darrell; 3rd: Jonna and KellyAnne; 5th: Mark; 6th: Alton; 7th: Jemmye and Ruthie; 9th: Aneesa; 10th: Big Easy; 11th: Derrick and Jisela						

=== Episode progress ===
Contestants	Episodes							
Contestants	1	2	3	4	5	6	7	Finale
Yes	WON	SAFE	SAFE	WON	SAFE	SAFE	SAFE	WINNER
Darrell	WON	SAFE	WIN	SAFE	SAFE	SAFE	SAFE	SECOND
Jonna	SAFE	SAFE	SAFE	SAFE	SAFE	WON	SAFE	THIRD
KellyAnne	LOSE	SAFE	WON	SAFE	SAFE	SAFE	WIN	THIRD
Mark	SAFE	SAFE	SAFE	CAPT	SAFE	ELIM	WIN	FIFTH
Alton	SAFE	SAFE	SAFE	SAFE	ELIM	SAFE	SAFE	SIXTH
Jemmye	WON	SAFE	SAFE	SAFE	SAFE	SAFE	SAFE	SEVENTH
Ruthie	SAFE	SAFE	SAFE	WIN	SAFE	WIN	SAFE	SEVENTH
Aneesa	SAFE	WIN	SAFE	WON	ELIM	SAFE	SAFE	NINTH
Big Easy	WON	SAFE	SAFE	SAFE	SAFE	WIN	ELIM	TENTH
Derrick	SAFE	SAFE	SAFE	WON	SAFE	SAFE	SAFE	ELEVENTH
Jisela	CAPT	SAFE	SAFE	SAFE	SAFE	SAFE	ELIM	ELEVENTH
Kendal	WON	ELIM	CAPT	SAFE	WIN	ELIM	OUT	
Nehemiah	WON	CAPT	ELIM	LOSE	SAFE	SAFE	OUT	
Katie	SAFE	SAFE	LOSE	SAVE	SAFE	OUT		
Laterrian	ELIM	SAFE	SAFE	SAFE	WIN	LOST		
Beth	WON	SAFE	SAFE	RISK	OUT			
Syrus	SAFE	SAFE	WON	SAFE	OUT			
Arissa	WON	SAFE	SAFE	QUIT				
Teck	WIN	SAFE	OUT					
Trishelle	WON	OUT						
Ace	OUT							

Competition
The contestant won the final challenge
The contestant did not win the final challenge
The contestant was eliminated during the final challenge
The contestant won the challenge as a team captain, or individually, and was granted immunity from the Arena
The contestant won the challenge as a team captain, or individually, and was granted the Life Saver
The contestant won the challenge, but was not granted immunity from the Arena or the Life Saver
The contestant was not selected for the Arena
The contestant was a losing team captain at the challenge, but did not have to compete in the Arena
The contestant won the elimination in the Arena
The contestant was selected for the Arena, but did not have to compete
The contestant was voted into the Arena, but was saved by the Lifesaver
The contestant lost in the Arena and was eliminated
The contestant won the challenge, but was selected for the Arena, lost and was eliminated
The contestant withdrew from the competition

=== Final Challenge scoreboard ===
Contestants	Checkpoint							
Contestants	1	2/3	3	4	5	6	Total	Finish
Yes	4	5	5	4	3	10	31	1st
Darrell	5	4	4	5	2	9	29	2nd
Jonna	5	5	2	3	4	5	24	3rd
KellyAnne	1	2	5	5	5	6	24	3rd
Mark	3	3	2	1	5	8	22	5th
Alton	2	2	3	2	4	7	20	6th
Jemmye	4	4	3	1	1	4	17	7th
Ruthie	3	1	4	2	3	4	17	7th
Aneesa	2	3	1	4	2	1	13	9th
Big Easy	1	1	1	3	1	2	9	10th
Derrick	0						0	11th
Jisela	0						0	11th

== Voting progress ==
Loser	Laterrian losing captain	Trishelle last-place	Nehemiah losing captain	Beth losing captain		Syrus last-place	Beth last-place	Kendal losing captain	Mark losing captain	Big Easy last-place	Jisela last-place
House Vote	Ace; 10 of 18 votes	Kendal; 6 of 18 votes	Teck volunteered	Katie volunteered	Arissa; 8 of 14 re-votes	Alton; 8 of 14 votes	Aneesa; Alton's choice	Katie; 12 of 12 votes	Laterrian; Katie's choice	Nehemiah; 4 of 10 votes	Kendal; Nehemiah's choice
Voter	Episode										
Voter	1	2	3	4		5		6		7	
Yes	—N/a	Kendal	—N/a	—N/a	Arissa	Alton		Katie		Nehemiah	
Darrell	Ace	Katie		—N/a	Arissa	Alton		Katie		Yes	
Jonna	—N/a	—N/a	—N/a	—N/a	Arissa	Big Easy		Katie		Derrick	
KellyAnne		—N/a	—N/a	—N/a	Arissa	Alton		Katie			
Mark	—N/a	Kendal	—N/a			Alton					
Alton	Ace	—N/a	—N/a	—N/a	Kendal	—N/a	Aneesa	Katie		Yes	
Jemmye	—N/a	Kendal	—N/a	—N/a	Arissa	Big Easy		Katie		Derrick	
Ruthie	Ace	—N/a	—N/a			Alton				Nehemiah	
Aneesa	Ace		—N/a	—N/a	Kendal	Alton		Katie		Nehemiah	
Big Easy	—N/a	—N/a	—N/a	—N/a	Aneesa	Alton					
Derrick	Ace	—N/a	—N/a	—N/a	Arissa	Nehemiah		Katie		Nehemiah	
Jisela		Kendal	—N/a	—N/a	Kendal	Big Easy		Katie			
Kendal	Ace	Jisela		—N/a	Aneesa					Alton	
Nehemiah	Ace					Derrick		Katie		Yes	Kendal
Katie	—N/a	—N/a		Katie		Alton		Katie	Laterrian		
Laterrian		—N/a	—N/a	—N/a	Arissa			Katie			
Beth	—N/a	—N/a	—N/a								
Syrus	Ace	—N/a	—N/a	—N/a	Arissa						
Arissa	Ace	Kendal	—N/a	—N/a	KellyAnne						
Teck		Kendal	Teck								
Trishelle	Ace										
Ace	—N/a										

== Team selections ==
- **Bold** indicates team captains

Contestants	Episodes									
Contestants	1	2	3	4		5			6	7
Yes	Silver	Individual	**Grey**	Gold		Silver	Jemmye	Individual	**Copper**	Individual
Darrell	Silver	Individual	**Silver**	Black	Silver	Copper	Aneesa	Individual	**Silver**	Individual
Jonna	Copper	Individual	**Black**	**Copper**		Silver	Alton	Individual	Gold	Individual
KellyAnne	**Copper**	Individual	Silver	Black		Gold	Derrick	Individual	**Silver**	Individual
Mark	Copper	Individual	**Gold**	**Gold**		Copper	Ruthie	Individual	**Black**	Individual
Alton	Copper	Individual	Gold	Copper		Silver	Jonna	Individual	Silver	Individual
Jemmye	Silver	Individual	Gold	Silver		Silver	Yes	Individual	Black	Individual
Ruthie	Copper	Individual	Grey	**Gold**		Copper	Mark	Individual	**Gold**	Individual
Anessa	Copper	Individual	Black	Gold		Copper	Darrell	Individual	Copper	Individual
Big Easy	Silver	Individual	Copper	**Copper**		Copper	Katie	Individual	**Gold**	Individual
Derrick	Copper	Individual	**Black**	Gold		Gold	KellyAnne	Individual	Copper	Individual
Jisela	**Silver**	Individual	Copper	Black		Gold	Nehemiah	Individual	Silver	Individual
Kendal	Silver	Individual	**Silver**	**Black**		Gold	Laterrian	Individual	**Black**	Individual
Nehemiah	Silver	Individual	**Copper**	**Silver**		Gold	Jisela	Individual	Black	Individual
Katie	Copper	Individual	**Copper**	Copper		Copper	Big Easy	Individual	**Copper**	
Laterrian	**Copper**	Individual	Black	**Black**		Gold	Kendal	Individual	Gold	
Beth	Silver	Individual	**Gold**	**Silver**		Silver	Syrus	Individual		
Syrus	Copper	Individual	Silver	Silver		Silver	Beth	Individual		
Arissa	Silver	Individual	**Grey**	Copper						
Teck	**Silver**	Individual	Grey							
Trishelle	Silver	Individual								
Ace	Copper									

Final Challenge (Ep. 8/9)
Checkpoint #1	Checkpoint #2 & #3 (Pt. 1)	Checkpoint #3 (Pt. 2)	Checkpoint #4	Checkpoint #5
Alton & Aneesa	Alton & KellyAnne	Alton & Jemmye	Alton & Ruthie	Alton & Jonna
Big Easy & KellyAnne	Aneesa & Mark	Aneesa & Big Easy	Aneesa & Yes	Aneesa & Darrell
Darrell & Jonna	Big Easy & Ruthie	Darrell & Ruthie	Big Easy & Jonna	Big Easy & Jemmye
Jemmye & Yes	Darrell & Jemmye	Jonna & Mark	Darrell & KellyAnne	KellyAnne & Mark
Mark & Ruthie	Jonna & Yes	KellyAnne & Yes	Mark & Jemmye	Ruthie & Yes
Derrick & Jisela				

== Episodes ==
No. overall	No. in season	Title	Original release date
1	1	"Legends Never Die"	April 1, 2021
2	2	"All That You Can't Leave Behind"	April 8, 2021
3	3	"I've Got the Power"	April 15, 2021
4	4	"Semi-Charmed Lifesaver"	April 22, 2021
5	5	"Nuthin' but an OG Thang"	April 29, 2021
6	6	"Free Fallin'"	May 6, 2021
7	7	"What About Your Friends?"	May 13, 2021
8	8	"Mo Money Mo Problems"	May 20, 2021
9	9	"You're the Best Around"	May 27, 2021

=== Reunion special ===
The Reunion special aired on June 3, 2021, and was hosted by former NFL player Nate Burleson and entertainment personality Maria Menounos. The cast members who attended the reunion were: Yes, Darrell, Jonna, KellyAnne, Mark, Jemmye, Big Easy, Derrick, Jisela and Beth.

== Reception ==
Decider described the season as "pretty entertaining" and also enjoyable for fans who hadn't watched the original show since its early days.

=== Awards ===
The season was nominated by the Guild of Music Supervisors Awards for Best Music Supervision in Reality Television.
