= Road Rules: Islands =

- Season 4
- Starring: Erika Roen; Jake Bronstein; Kalle Dedolph; Oscar Hernandez; Vince Forcier
- No. of episodes: 15

Release
- Original network: MTV
- Original release: 14 July – 13 October 1997

Season chronology
- ← Previous; Road Rules: Europe Next → Road Rules: Northern Trail

Road Rules: Islands is the fourth season of the MTV reality television series Road Rules. It took place exclusively on various island locations and in the United States.

== Cast ==
Cast member	Age^{1}	Hometown
Erika Roen	22	San Diego, California
Jake Bronstein	18	Philadelphia, Pennsylvania
Kalle Dedolph	19	Fort Collins, Colorado
Oscar Hernandez	18	Trujillo Alto, Puerto Rico
Vince Forcier	20	Boca Raton, Florida

- ^Note 1: At time of filming.

== Missions ==
Episode #	Mission Name	Completed	Notes
1/2	Paintball	Completed	The cast is introduced and meet each other. Kalle reveals hesitations about her long-term boyfriend. Later, Kalle and Jake notice Vince's distant behavior, but they solve this issue quickly. Oscar demonstrates his national pride by displaying Puerto Rican flags in the Winnebago. This mission involves the cast facing off in a game of paintball against a team of former Road Rulers made up of Los (season one), Christian, Timmy, Devin, Effie (season two), and Michelle (season three) in order to secure money for living expenses. Kalle and Erika show reservations about the game, which leads to a frustrated breakdown from both. Out of three heats, the Road Rulers only win one, leaving them with only $400 for the next two weeks. As they begin their journey, Jake and Kalle begin to bond. The cast arrives at a Coast Guard camp. Oscar's disinclination for authority gets him in some trouble with the lieutenants in charge, which in turn annoys the other cast members. The cast members then undergo rigorous search-and-rescue training on a Navy ship. Afterwards, Jake decides he wants to quit the training which causes tension among the rest of the cast; however, he changes his mind after heartfelt pleas from Kalle and Oscar. Most of the cast suffers from extreme seasickness and fatigue as they struggle to prepare for their final search-and-rescue test.
3	Search and Rescue	Completed	The cast successfully comes together and completes their final search-and-rescue mission. They return to the Coast Guard base to find the iconic Road Rules skull has been stolen from their RV. Assuming it was stolen by one of the Coast Guard people, Oscar and Jake steal the Coast Guard's flag in order to negotiate a trade. When told they need to return the flag, Oscar's obstinance upsets Erika and the others' disapproval leads to Oscar and Jake returning the flag. Erika invites everyone to her mother's house. Seeing Erika's family brings up troubling emotions for Kalle, whose own mother died. She takes comfort in confiding to Jake. Oscar and Erika repeatedly come into conflict, especially over Oscar's poor driving skills.
4	Stand-Up Comedy Contest	Completed	The cast shares reservations about Oscar's tardiness and attitude. The cast then learns they must split into teams to perform stand-up comedy for a local restaurant, but Oscar feels awkward when no one wants him on their team. Oscar's exclusion from the rest of the group leads him to become homesick, but his mood brightens when he receives a letter from home. A cleaning spree leads to a better relationship between Oscar and the rest of the cast. The cast performs their returns in front of a packed crowd; Vince and Erika pretend to be an arguing couple, while Oscar pretends to be a poor interpreter for Kalle with a naked appearance from Jake. Vince and Erika win second place overall and obtain a much-needed $100.
5	Wing-Walking	Completed	The cast travels from California to Miami. Along the way, Kalle and Erika bond over their similar troubled upbringings. For the mission, Vince, Erika, and Jake learn to fly a plane and perform loops and rolls, while Oscar and Kalle train to walk on the wings of an airplane. Kalle and Jake come closer, which results in conflicting emotions for Kalle as she considers her long-term relationship with her boyfriend. Later, Kalle is chosen to walk on the wings of an airplane, while Oscar receives a smaller role. Kalle faces her fears and successfully walks on the airplane, which causes Jake to admit his admiration and infatuation with her.
6	Pedi Cab Job	Completed	The cast expresses frustration over their lack of money and, in their desperation for food, accidentally hit the roof of a KFC building with the Winnebago. Jake nearly gets in trouble over a lost driver's license, but in the end the damage on the building is negligent. The cast is offered jobs as pedicab drivers, to which none of them are enthused, but accept anyway in order to obtain some money. Oscar excels at the job, and in the end they make a total of $340. After their job, the cast receives plane tickets to the Cayman Islands for their next mission, which they learn is to photograph, model, and produce a swimsuit calendar. The assignment brings up self-esteem issues for Vince regarding his appearance, but their boss is incredibly pleased with the calendar and rewards them with $1500. Jake's infatuation with Kalle brings up conflicting emotions on her part, and Jake begins to feel led on. Later, Vince saves a stray dog.
6	Produce Swimsuit Calendar	Completed	
7	Harvest Honey	Completed	The cast learn their next mission is to harvest honey, but the prospect of bee stings worries everyone. Several of them get stung, but they complete the mission successfully. The next clue includes tickets to Saint Thomas, where they learn they will have to undergo a survival course and stay on a deserted island. Oscar thrives in the isolated environment, while Vince falls sick. After four days alone on the island, Bob Denver shows up and presents the cast with their next clue, which indicates they will travel to Puerto Rico. As they spend their last few days on Saint Thomas, Jake and Kalle continue to spend time together, but they get in an argument when Jake reveals he has been tested for AIDS, which Kalle doesn't feel is necessary for herself since she's only had unprotected sex with one partner.
7	Survive Deserted Island	Completed	
8	The Goat, The Egg, and The Well	Completed	The cast travels to Puerto Rico, where Oscar enthusiastically displays his Puerto Rican pride and reunites with his family. However, the other cast members take offense to Oscar's immature friends and their drunken advances toward Kalle. However, Oscar is able to defuse the tension. Later, the cast arrives at a small lodge, which offers them a free stay if they can milk a goat, eat an eggroll, and throw a penny in a well. After a long struggle in the tiny town, including an incident where the van's wheels get stuck in the mud, Oscar's ingenuity and knowledge eventually earns the cast their free stay.
9	Brown Water Raft Race	Completed	After some GPS troubles, the cast arrives at their next mission, which is to individually design and build a raft out of assorted objects and race their rafts against each other. In order to begin the race, however, the cast members must jump off of a tall bridge. Jake's raft, though unconventional, earns him a victory in the race. Jake invites Oscar to his prize, a fancy dinner, where they bond. The next day, the cast travels to Martinique. While there, Vince lets loose, which causes Erika and him to grow closer and begin to drift from the others. Later, the next mission is presented to the cast: they must learn how to sail. Though they are initially frustrated with their instructor, they eventually get the hang of sailing until bad weather causes chaos.
9	Learn How to Sail	Completed	
10	Plan a Wedding	Completed	As the cast goofs off on the sailboat, Oscar injures himself and breaks two of his toes. At the doctor's office, he struggles with the decision to put a cast on his foot and decides against it. The cast arrives in St. Lucia and are given their next mission: to plan a wedding in under 48 hours. Though there are some complications, the wedding goes off successfully and they earn a night in a resort and some extra money. In the resort, they receive a clue to their next mission: camping inside an active volcano. Oscar's broken toes cause issues when the cast must hike to the volcano, but he perseveres.
10	Sleep in an Active Volcano	Completed	
11	Host Radio Show "LOVE RULES"	Completed	The cast continues to scale the perilous terrain of the volcano and eventually sets up their tent. A rainy night proves to be vastly uncomfortable. However, despite the arduous journey, difficult conditions, and Oscar's broken toes, the cast successfully completes the mission. Later, Jake and Kalle share an intimate moment, which causes some internal conflict for Kalle. The cast then travels to Grenada for their next mission, to host a radio show about sex and love. On the show, Kalle and Jake admit their feelings for each other. However, the majority of callers to the show ignore the show's theme and instead bring up off-topic conversations or insult the cast's lack of Grenadian knowledge. Surprise callers Adam Carolla and Jake's father tune in, with Jake's father giving the cast their next clue - to visit Jake's house.
12	Visit Jake's House	Completed	As the cast travels to Philadelphia, Kalle helps Jake apply for college. Jake's parents eagerly embrace the entire cast, especially Kalle. The Road Rulers receive their next clue, directing them to Knicks auditions. Kalle calls her best friend from New York and confides her emotional turmoil regarding her simultaneous relationship with Jake and her boyfriend at home. As she writes her boyfriend a letter detailing her feelings, Kalle breaks down. Later, the cast travels to New York and the big city life proves to be unfamiliar yet exhilarating to the entire cast. The cast discovers they will be auditioning for the Knicks dance team. As they begin to learn the dance, Vince refuses to participate and is later penalized. Erika, on the other hand, does well and earns a further audition. However, her anxiety and humiliation gets the best of her and she messes up, losing her chance to perform at the game. The rejection causes her to break down, but later she feels proud of her effort.
12	Audition for Knicks City Dancers	Completed	
13	The Real World vs. Road Rules Challenge (Note: This competition actually chronologically took place in Puerto Rico, between episodes 9 and 10, but was aired several episodes after its chronological occurrence.)	Completed	The Road Rulers receive cast bios of The Real World: Boston cast in preparation for an upcoming faceoff, and leave a prank message for them at their Puerto Rican lodging. The Real World cast arrives in Boston and responds to the Road Rulers' taunts with competitive spirits. As both casts arrive at the competition grounds, Oscar's reluctance to get his shoes dirty rubs the rest of the Road Rulers the wrong way. Both casts learn that there are five events, each one with a money prize for the winner, and the overall losing team will suffer some sort of humiliation. The first event involves fitting cast members through various holes in a net; Real World wins this event. The second event is a strategy game that involves transporting cast members from one platform to another using only one plank; Real World wins this event as well, though Syrus injures himself. The faceoff continues as the competitors learn their next event is to get five team members to balance on a very small box for five seconds. Real World easily wins this event as well. The continued defeats demoralize the Road Rules team, who lament their lack of money. The next event includes getting five team members to scale a twelve-foot wall. Road Rules finally wins this event. The final event is tug-of-war, which worries the Road Rulers as they examine Syrus and Sean's strength. However, a slip from Montana ensures a Road Rules victory. Overall, though, Road Rules wins less events so they are told they must give pedicures to the Real World team. Oscar's refusal to perform a pedicure incites a mud fight with Montana. Syrus heads to the hospital as the casts reunite later that night at a club, where rumors abound about Sean and Erika's flirting.
14	Audition for a Soap Opera	Completed	Jake and Kalle share plans to move to New York City together. The cast then goes through their next mission: auditioning for the soap opera All My Children. As no one has prior acting experience, they are all uneasy about the audition. Vince, Erika, and Oscar are chosen for small roles, which surprises them. Meanwhile, Kalle and Jake become gofers for Kelly Ripa and Mark Consuelos. While Jake and Kalle bond with the married couple, while the others find themselves unexpectedly bored on set and unfulfilled with the simple roles. The cast then gets a clue to arrive at their final mission: walking on hot coals.
15	Handsome Reward: Walk Across Fire	Completed	After discussing goals and conquering life challenges, each cast member successfully walks across a bed of hot coals. Following the mission, the cast enjoys dinner and accommodations for a night at an upscale hotel. There, they learn about their handsome reward: an all-expense-paid trip on the Semester at Sea program. Erika, however, has reservations about the reward because she feels inadequate for her age. As the cast prepares to depart, they reflect on the trip and how they have grown as individuals. Good-byes bring heartfelt tears and emotions as the cast leaves to go to their respective homes.

== Episodes ==
No. overall	No. in season	Title	Original release date
46	1	"Nice to Meet You"	14 July 1997
47	2	"Floxim in the Sea"	14 July 1997
48	3	"Latin Male + Assertive Female = Danger"	21 July 1997
49	4	"Comedy Is No Laughing Matter"	28 July 1997
50	5	"Fear of Heights"	4 August 1997
51	6	"Hunters and Gatherers"	11 August 1997
52	7	"Bee Stung Lips and Deserted Island Tips"	18 August 1997
53	8	"Grumpy Goats, Goofy Gang Members and a Gorgeous Girl"	25 August 1997
54	9	"If Your Friend Jumped Off a Bridge..."	1 September 1997
55	10	"Three Legs, Two Broken Toes and One Lava Pit"	8 September 1997
56	11	"Love Is in the Airwaves"	15 September 1997
57	12	"The Last Dance and a Slippery Romance"	22 September 1997
58	13	"The Real World vs. Road Rules Challenge"	29 September 1997
59	14	"Don't Drop the Soap"	6 October 1997
60	15	"Fire and Water"	13 October 1997

== After filming ==
=== The Challenge ===
Cast member	Seasons of The Challenge
Erika Roen	—N/a
Jake Bronstein	Battle of the Sexes
Kalle Dedolph	Challenge
Oscar Hernandez	—N/a
Vince Forcier	—N/a
