= Real World/Road Rules Challenge: Battle of the Seasons =

5th season of the reality television series

Battle of the Seasons
- Season 5
- Presented by: Mark Long; Eric Nies
- No. of contestants: 32
- Winners: Sean Duffy; Elka Walker; Mike Mizanin; Coral Smith; Danny Roberts; Kelley Limp
- Location: Cabo San Lucas, Mexico
- No. of episodes: 17 (including the Reunion special)

Release
- Original network: MTV
- Original release: January 28 – May 27, 2002

Season chronology
- ← Previous; Extreme Challenge Next → Battle of the Sexes

Real World/Road Rules Challenge: Battle of the Seasons is the fifth season of the MTV reality game show, The Challenge (at the time known as Real World/Road Rules Challenge).

Battle of the Seasons premiered in early 2002 and took place in Cabo San Lucas, Mexico. In each episode, the cast competed in a challenge, and the top three Real World and top three Road Rules teams would become the "Inner Circle" and have the power to vote off teams. The "Inner Circle" was determined by a cumulative score that would be tallied on a leader board. The final six teams would compete for a final prize worth $300,000.

This is the first edition of Battle of the Seasons series, with the second Battle of the Seasons, following in 2012 with a completely different format.

== Format ==
Separated into teams of Real World and Road Rules, each cast member is paired off with a castmate from their original season and they gain points after each daily mission based on their performances. The pairs with the most points cumulative from each team form the "Inner Circle" and vote off another pair from their own team. The individual winning pair of each challenge also earn additional prizes. After five pairs from each team are voted off, the final three Real World teams and final three Road Rules teams compete against each other in a series of challenges before the final race, that earns the winning teams $300,000.

== Contestants ==
Real World team
Male partner	Female partner	Original season	Finish
Sean Duffy	Elka Walker	The Real World: Boston	Winners
Mike Mizanin	Coral Smith	The Real World: Back to New York	Winners
Danny Roberts	Kelley Limp	The Real World: New Orleans	Winners
Norman Korpi	Becky Blasband	The Real World: New York	Episode 8
Mike Lambert	Flora Alekseyeun	The Real World: Miami	Episode 6
Stephen Williams IV	Lindsay Brien	The Real World: Seattle	Episode 5
Mike Johnson	Sharon Gitau	The Real World: London	Episode 4
Jon Brennan	Beth Stolarczyk	The Real World: Los Angeles	Episode 1

Road Rules team
Male partner	Female partner	Original season	Finish
Theo Vonkurnatowski	Holly Brenston	Road Rules: Maximum Velocity Tour	Runners-up
Dan Setzler	Tara McDaniel	Road Rules: Northern Trail	Runners-up
Timmy Beggy	Emily Bailey	Road Rules: USA – The Second Adventure	Runners-up
Josh Florence	Holly Shand	Road Rules: Latin America	Episode 8
Adam Larson	Jisela Delgado	Road Rules: The Quest	Episode 6
Chris Melling	Belou Den Tex	Road Rules: Europe	Episode 5
Chadwick Pelletier	Piggy Thomas	Road Rules: Down Under	Episode 4
Yes Duffy	Veronica Portillo	Road Rules: Semester at Sea	Episode 1

== Gameplay ==
=== Challenge games ===
- Hang Man: Teams must hang on a pole as long as they can. The contraption is made so after one team member falls, the other team member will fall immediately.
  - Winners: Theo & Holly B. (Team Road Rules)
- Musical Inner-Tube Tango: In a game similar to musical chairs, teams will dance around a pool. Once the music stops, they must get an inner tube around their head. After each round, there will be two less inner-tubes. If one person from a team does not get an inner-tube, the whole team is eliminated.
  - Winners: Stephen & Lindsay (Team Real World)
- Vertical Limit: Each member of the team will climb as high as they can on a rope with buoys on it in three minutes. They will gain a point for every buoy they pass. If they fall off the rope, they cannot get back on, and the number they ended on will be their final number.
  - Winners: Danny & Kelley (Team Real World)
- Slam Dunk - Teams will bungee jump together back to back and try to score into hoops valued at 5, 10, and 15 points.
  - Winners: Theo & Holly B. (Team Road Rules)
- Ladder of Doom: A relay race where each member needs to climb down a ladder over a 50-foot basin and retrieve a flag and bring it back to the top of the ladder.
  - Winners: Theo & Holly B. (Team Road Rules)
- Round 'Em Up: Teams will enter a ring on horses and have a maximum of 15 minutes to round up at least one cow and get it into the pen.
  - Winners: Sean & Elka (Team Real World)
- Rush Hour: Teams will have to move one car out of the puzzle by moving other cars within the puzzle forward and backwards. The cars are not allowed to make any turns. Cars are also not allowed to hit any other cars; if this does happen, the team will be disqualified, and receive a score of 0. Teams will be sequestered for fairness.
  - Winners: Sean & Elka (Team Real World)
- Hands on the Saturn: Teams must have at least one whole hand on an ice sculpture of a Saturn sedan at all times. After two, three, and four hours, competitors must place another extremity (hand or feet) until all four are on the ice. Five minute breaks are allotted every three hours.
  - Winners: Dan & Tara (Team Road Rules)
- Sidekick Showdown: Similar to the game show, The Newlywed Game, team members must match answers to their team member's responses to personal questions.
  - Winners: Mike M. & Coral (Team Real World)
- Blockhead: Each member of the team has a responsibility: a swimmer and a builder. The swimmer must go into the ocean and retrieve cubes. The builder then must build a tower at least 4 cubes high with all the same color face of each cube facing outwards. Afterwards, one player must stand on the structure and blow a whistle.
  - Winners: Timmy & Emily (Team Road Rules)
- Siamese Wrestling: Team members will be bound together back to back wrestling another team. The teams need to pin down (a shoulder touching the mat) the other team for three seconds. It will be broken into two rounds: the first round will be two minutes and the second round will be a sudden death.
  - Winners: Timmy & Emily (Team Road Rules)

=== Final challenge ===
For the final mission, the Ultimate Teams (Sean & Elka for Real World and Theo & Holly B. for Road Rules) must delegate tasks for each team members to accomplish. The finale is divided in a relay race to collect fish. Once the teams collect their fish and solve their puzzle, they must climb a rope ladder to the top of a cliff and cross the finish line.

- Kayaking: Two teams will race on their kayaks to a buoy with a pair of fish hooked to a carabiner. After unhooking their fish, they must kayak to the yacht.
- Free Dive: The two next teams will deep sea dive into the ocean and to retrieve their next set of fish and allow the next team to pass.
- Longboard: The final two teams will swim in tandem on a longboard, unhook their last set of fish from a buoy, and swim out to the beach shore.
- Fishticks Puzzle: After retrieving all of their fish, the teams will then stack them from the smallest fish to the largest fish and transfer them from one end of a stick to another. Once completed, the team may advanced to the rope ladder and cross the finish line.
  - Winners: Team Real World (Sean & Elka, Mike M. & Coral, and Danny & Kelley)

== Game summary ==
Episode		Winners		Inner Circle	Eliminated
#	Challenge	Team	Prize Winners	Inner Circle	Eliminated
1	Hang Man	Road Rules	Theo & Holly B.	Danny & Kelley, Mike M. & Coral, Norman & Becky	Jon & Beth
1	Hang Man	Road Rules	Theo & Holly B.	Chadwick & Piggy, Theo & Holly B., Timmy & Emily	Yes & Veronica
3/4	Musical Inner-Tube Tango	Real World	Stephen & Lindsay	Dan & Tara, Theo & Holly B., Timmy & Emily	Chadwick & Piggy
3/4	Musical Inner-Tube Tango	Real World	Stephen & Lindsay	Mike M. & Coral, Sean & Elka, Stephen & Lindsay	Mike J. & Sharon
5/6	Vertical Limit	Real World	Danny & Kelley	Danny & Kelley, Mike M. & Coral, Sean & Elka	Stephen & Lindsay
5/6	Vertical Limit	Real World	Danny & Kelley	Dan & Tara, Theo & Holly B., Timmy & Emily	Chris & Belou
6	Slam Dunk	Road Rules	Theo & Holly B.	Danny & Kelley, Mike M. & Coral, Sean & Elka	Mike L. & Flora
6	Slam Dunk	Road Rules	Theo & Holly B.	Dan & Tara, Theo & Holly B., Timmy & Emily	Adam & Jisela
8	Ladder of Doom	Road Rules	Theo & Holly B.	Dan & Tara, Theo & Holly B., Timmy & Emily	Josh & Holly S.
8	Ladder of Doom	Road Rules	Theo & Holly B.	Danny & Kelley, Mike M. & Coral, Sean & Elka	Norman & Becky
9	Round 'Em Up	Real World	Sean & Elka	—N/a	
10	Rush Hour	Real World	Sean & Elka	—N/a	
11	Hands on Saturn	Road Rules	Dan & Tara	—N/a	
12	Sidekick Showdown	Real World	Mike M. & Coral	—N/a	
13	Block Head	Road Rules	Timmy & Emily	—N/a	
14	Siamese Wrestling	Road Rules	Timmy & Emily	—N/a	
15	Handsome Reward	**Real World**	**Sean & Elka**		

=== Scoreboard ===
Teams	Episode											
Teams	1	3/4	5/6	6	8	9	10	11	12	13	14	15
Sean & Elka	10	**29**	**44**	**55**	**74**	94	114	131	150	169	186	WINNER
Mike M. & Coral	**16**	**25**	**43**	**54**	**71**	87	104	123	143	158	174	WINNER
Danny & Kelley	**14**	23	**43**	**54**	**70**	89	107	122	138	154	172	WINNER
Theo & Holly B.	**20**	**34**	**53**	**73**	**93**	108	127	143	161	178	194	LOSER
Dan & Tara	15	**31**	**46**	**57**	**70**	87	103	123	139	157	176	LOSER
Timmy & Emily	**18**	**33**	**50**	**61**	**75**	93	93	111	128	148	168	LOSER
Norman & Becky	**13**	23	38	49	64							
Josh & Holly S.	12	25	38	49	68							
Mike L. & Flora	6	24	34	45								
Adam & Jisela	11	20	32	43								
Chris & Belou	7	19	29									
Stephen & Lindsay	9	**29**	41									
Mike J. & Sharon	5	21										
Chadwick & Piggy	**19**	26										
Yes & Veronica	17											
Jon & Beth	8											

Teams
The contestant is on the Real World team
The contestant is on the Road Rules team
Competition
Bold indicates the Inner Circle
The team won the final challenge
The team did not win the final challenge
The team came in first in the mission and won a prize
The team was safe from elimination
The team was eliminated by the Inner Circle

== Episodes ==
No. overall	No. in season	Title	Original release date
40	1	"Hang Man"	February 4, 2002
41	2	"Hurricane Juliette"	February 11, 2002
42	3	"Who To Vote Off?"	February 18, 2002
43	4	"Musical Inner-Tube Tango"	February 25, 2002
44	5	"Vertical Limit"	March 4, 2002
45	6	"Slam Dunk"	March 11, 2002
46	7	"Montezuma's Revenge"	March 25, 2002
47	8	"Ladder of Doom"	April 1, 2002
48	9	"Round 'Em Up"	April 8, 2002
49	10	"Rush Hour"	April 15, 2002
50	11	"Hands of Saturn"	April 22, 2002
51	12	"Sidekick Showdown"	April 29, 2002
52	13	"Blockhead"	May 6, 2002
53	14	"Siamese Wrestling"	May 13, 2002
54	15	"Handsome Reward"	May 20, 2002

=== Reunion special ===
The reunion special, Real World/Road Rules Challenge Battle of the Seasons: Inside the Inner Circle, was aired live on May 27, 2002 and was attended by the contestants who were in the Inner Circle until the season finale. The special was hosted by Lindsay Brien from The Real World: Seattle and Mark Long from Road Rules: USA – The First Adventure.
