= Road Rules: Maximum Velocity Tour =

- Season 9
- Starring: Holly Brentson; James Orlando; Kathryn Omeg; Laterrian Wallace; Msaada Nia; Theo Von Kurnatowski
- No. of episodes: 20 (including one special)

Release
- Original network: MTV
- Original release: June 19 – October 23, 2000

Season chronology
- ← Previous; Road Rules: Semester at Sea Next → Road Rules: The Quest

Road Rules: Maximum Velocity Tour was the ninth season of the MTV reality television series Road Rules. It took place mostly in the southern parts of the United States and in South Africa. A casting special aired on June 6, 2000, and the season premiered two weeks later on June 19, 2000.

== Cast ==
Cast member	Hometown
Holly Brentson	Auburn, CA
James Orlando	Loomis, CA
Kathryn Omeg	The Dalles, OR
Laterrian Wallace	Stanley, NC
Msaada Nia	Los Angeles, CA
Theo Vonkurnatowski	Mandeville, LA

Rainn Wilson portrayed the Road Master, an ambiguously villainous presenter who appeared on a screen in the RV to give clues prior to each challenge.

== Episodes ==
No. overall	No. in season	Title	Original release date
120	1	"Walking on the Wind"	June 19, 2000
121	2	"Frosty Face Off"	June 26, 2000
122	3	"Frosty Face Off (2)"	July 3, 2000
123	4	"Mission Impossible: Get Shorty"	July 10, 2000
124	5	"Fugitives of Love"	July 17, 2000
125	6	"Love, Lust and Lies"	July 24, 2000
126	7	"Swimming in Sex"	July 31, 2000
127	8	"My Louisiana"	August 7, 2000
128	9	"Theo Takes a Leap"	August 14, 2000
129	10	"A Square in a Social Circle"	August 21, 2000
130	11	"2 Negative Atmosphere"	August 28, 2000
131	12	"Stranger in a Strange Land"	September 4, 2000
132	13	"Blood and Goats"	September 11, 2000
133	14	"Revenge in the Bush"	September 18, 2000
134	15	"Flying With the African Birds"	September 25, 2000
135	16	"Alone With Your Thoughts"	October 2, 2000
136	17	"A Day Out on O-Town"	October 9, 2000
137	18	"Letting Out the True Feelings"	October 16, 2000
138	19	"The Ball and Chain"	October 23, 2000

== After filming ==
Holly Brentson married Road Rules: Down Under cast member Chadwick Pelletier.

Between 2013 and 2014, Theo Von served as the host for the comedy game show Deal with It on TBS. In 2016, Netflix released Theo Von's first comedy special, titled No Offense and his second comedy special in 2021.

=== The Challenge ===
Cast member	Seasons of The Challenge	Other appearances
Holly Brentson	Battle of the Seasons (2002)	—N/a
James Orlando	Extreme Challenge, Battle of the Sexes	—N/a
Kathryn Omeg	—N/a	—N/a
Laterrian Wallace	Extreme Challenge, Battle of the Sexes, The Gauntlet	The Challenge: All Stars (season 1), The Challenge: All Stars (season 2), The Challenge: All Stars (season 3)
Msaada Nia	—N/a	—N/a
Theo Vonkurnatowski	Battle of the Seasons (2002), The Gauntlet, Battle of the Sexes 2, Fresh Meat	—N/a
