= The Real World: Miami =

Coordinates: 25°47′39″N 80°09′18″W

- Season 5
- The cast of The Real World: Miami
- Starring: Sarah Becker; Dan Renzi; Melissa Padrón; Joe Patane; Cynthia Roberts; Flora Alekseyeun; Mike Lambert
- No. of episodes: 22

Release
- Original network: MTV
- Original release: July 10 – December 4, 1996

Season chronology
- ← Previous; The Real World: London Next → The Real World: Boston

The Real World: Miami is the fifth season of MTV's reality television series The Real World, which focuses on a group of diverse strangers living together for several months in a different city each season, as cameras follow their lives and interpersonal relationships. It is the first season of The Real World to be filmed in the South Atlantic States region of the United States, specifically in Florida.

The season featured seven people who lived in a house on Rivo Alto Island and was the first season filmed in the United States outside of New York and California. Production for the season took place from February to July 1996. The season premiered on July 10 of that year, consisted of 22 episodes. This is the first of two seasons filmed in Florida. Ten years later, the show set its seventeenth season, returning to the state in the Key Haven neighborhood of Key West.

== Season changes ==
This was the first season in which the housemates were given a season-long assignment or task, an aspect of the series that would continue in almost all subsequent seasons; the Brooklyn and D.C. seasons dispensed with it. This season the cast was given $50,000 startup money to begin a business of their choosing. The cast's efforts were marked by much disorganization and conflict, and while ideas such as a dessert delivery service and a fashion line were floated about, they were ultimately not able to start the business.

== The residence ==
The house is located at 445 E Rivo Alto Dr, in Miami Beach, just north of the Venetian Causeway on affluent Rivo Alto Island. The four bedroom, three bathroom house is on 3/10 acre (1,214 m^{2}) of land, and is 4,976 square feet (462.3 m^{2}). Its current owner is former Ford CEO Jacques Nasser.

== Cast ==
Cast member	Age (Note: Age at the time of filming.)	Hometown
Sarah Becker	25	San Diego, California
Sarah is a graduate of Indiana University who works at Wildstorm Comics in La Jolla, California. A self-described "19-year-old trapped in a 25-year-old body", whom MTV describes as a "tomboy", Sarah enjoys skateboarding, collect empty Blistex tubes and Swatch watches, and dressing up as television characters. In Episode 13, she brings home a puppy named Leroy.
Dan Renzi	21	Overland Park, Kansas
Dan, who is originally from Kansas, is an openly gay student at Rutgers University, where he has been editor of the student paper for two years. His interests include world economics, LGBT rights and environmental studies. In Miami, he begins a modeling career with Irene Marie Models. He also begins dating a man named Arnie who is still in the closet, though he later begins dating another man named Johnny. During the season, he gets into heated arguments with Melissa and Flora. By the end of the season, he moves to Milan to pursue his modeling career.
Melissa Padrón	22	Miami, Florida
Melissa is a Miami native from a traditional Cuban-American family, who is about to graduate from the University of Miami. In Episode 12, she and Dan get into a fight, during which she calls him a "flamer", after Dan excoriates her for opening his mail, which according to him, could have cost him his job, though they later reconcile. In Episode 20, following an argument with Sarah, Melissa moves out of the house but remains part of the show and the cast's assignment.
Joe Patane	25	Brooklyn, New York
Joe is an Italian-American graduate business student at Fordham University in New York City. He owns a small business, Computane Corp, and is eager to start the business with his housemates. He has a tall girlfriend named Nicole, but he indicates he has difficulty remaining faithful to her, and when she visits the house, some of the other housemates, notably Cynthia, express incredulity at their relationship, and an aversion to her. Nonetheless, he proposes to her by the end of the season.
Cynthia Roberts	22	Oakland, California
Cynthia, who is originally from Atlanta, Georgia, is an African-American waitress who attends San Jose State University. Her father died some years ago, but she is still close with her mother and sisters. MTV describes her as a "straightforward" person who does not like to kiss on the first date. At the conclusion of the season she accepts a job offer in Miami.
Flora Alekseyeun	24	Boston, Massachusetts
Flora of Russian ethnicity, won several national marketing competitions while attending the Art Institute of Boston. During the season, she carries on an affair with a man named Louis, without the knowledge of her boyfriend, Mitchell. MTV describes her as an "uninhibited" woman who doesn't care what others think. She describes herself as both "a carefree spirit", and at times, a "bitch". In the premiere, she takes a job as a bartender, though Cynthia openly criticizes her for dressing provocatively in her job interview. In Episode 18, she gets into a fight with Dan, after Mike tells her that Dan related to him statements by her that Mitchell beat her, and says that Mitchell is very good to her.
Mike Lambert	24	Jacksonville, Florida
Mike has a strong background in accounting and restaurant management, which he is hoping to put to use for the group's business project. He also enjoys partying, and in Episode 17, after sharing time in the hot tub with Melissa another woman he brought home, the trio move to the bathroom, where the other housemates eavesdropping outside the window hear what sound like the lovemaking, though Mike and Melissa deny any shared encounter.

=== Duration of cast ===
Cast members	Episodes																					
Cast members	1	2	3	4	5	6	7	8	9	10	11	12	13	14	15	16	17	18	19	20	21	22
Cynthia	Featured	Featured	Featured	Featured	Featured	Featured	Featured	Featured	Featured	Featured	Featured	Featured	Featured	Featured	Featured	Featured	Featured	Featured	Featured	Featured	Featured	Featured
Dan	Featured	Featured	Featured	Featured	Featured	Featured	Featured	Featured	Featured	Featured	Featured	Featured	Featured	Featured	Featured	Featured	Featured	Featured	Featured	Featured	Featured	Featured
Flora	Featured	Featured	Featured	Featured	Featured	Featured	Featured	Featured	Featured	Featured	Featured	Featured	Featured	Featured	Featured	Featured	Featured	Featured	Featured	Featured	Featured	Featured
Joe	Featured	Featured	Featured	Featured	Featured	Featured	Featured	Featured	Featured	Featured	Featured	Featured	Featured	Featured	Featured	Featured	Featured	Featured	Featured	Featured	Featured	Featured
Mike	Featured	Featured	Featured	Featured	Featured	Featured	Featured	Featured	Featured	Featured	Featured	Featured	Featured	Featured	Featured	Featured	Featured	Featured	Featured	Featured	Featured	Featured
Sarah	Featured	Featured	Featured	Featured	Featured	Featured	Featured	Featured	Featured	Featured	Featured	Featured	Featured	Featured	Featured	Featured	Featured	Featured	Featured	Featured	Featured	Featured
Melissa	Featured	Featured	Featured	Featured	Featured	Featured	Featured	Featured	Featured	Featured	Featured	Featured	Featured	Featured	Featured	Featured	Featured	Featured	Featured	Left (Note: Melissa voluntarily leaves the house in Episode 20 after an argument with Sarah.)		

Notes

- Melissa voluntarily leaves the house in Episode 20 after an argument with Sarah.

== Episodes ==
No. overall	No. in season	Title	Original release date
78	1	"Welcome to the Picture Show"	July 10, 1996
The roommates are at their respective homes saying goodbye to friends and family. Joe is a student in New York, with a strangely tall girlfriend named Nicki. Cynthia lives in Oakland and is excited to be living in a big house in Miami. Flora is a bartender from Boston who claims to speak her mind. Sarah is a skateboarder who works for a comic book company in San Diego. Melissa is a Miami native and comes from Cuban heritage. Mike, the all-American guy, has experience managing a restaurant. Joe and Sarah shock the roommates by jumping into the pool fully clothed before the first day is over. On the phone, Melissa describes her new roommates as "weird".
79	2	"Beauty is Only Skin Deep"	July 17, 1996
The roommates meet Landon, their business advisor, and discuss possible ideas for their business venture. Flora gets frustrated when the group rejects her idea for a trendy coffee shop. Dan is turned down for a job at Café Torino but is successful in his Ocean Drive magazine pursuit. Flora uses her sex appeal to get a bartending job and a date with her employer, Louis. Meanwhile, Flora has a boyfriend back home named Mitchell. At home, the roommates decide that Flora "acted like a ho".
80	3	"The Temptation of Joe"	July 24, 1996
The roommates get primped to go dancing at Bash while Joe stays home to show he's "unavailable". Later, Joe brings out an old photo album and professes his wild attraction to women. When Joe flirts with a waitress at dinner, Mike wants to know his secret with women. In meeting, the roommates discuss more business ideas. More signs of relationship trouble arise between Joe and his girlfriend Nicki.
81	4	"The Silence of the Dan"	July 31, 1996
Cynthia is frustrated about the men in her life and her overall dating situation. Dan feels isolated when communication problems with his roommates arise. Meanwhile, he is discovered at the Michelle Pommier agency and participates in an Armani runway show. His roommates show their support at the show, deciding to put their conflicts temporarily on hold.
82	5	"Torn Between Two Lovers"	August 7, 1996
As the group struggles to establish a business, Joe heads back to New York for the weekend to move out of his apartment and prepare to relocate to Miami. During this same weekend, Flora's on-again, off-again boyfriend Mitchell visits her from Boston. Their rocky relationship seems fine and dandy when he's in town, especially since he doesn't know about her other boy toy, Miami businessman Louis.
83	6	"Fear of Commitment Poster Children"	August 14, 1996
Cesar, Melissa's boyfriend of four months, has become extra possessive ever since she moved in the house. He has a problem with sharing her with the other cast members. Dan and criminal defense attorney Arnie start spending some quality time together. As Dan struggles to help Arnie come out fully, the group continues to come up empty-handed and can't seem to agree on a business.
84	7	"America Needs Underwear"	August 21, 1996
The group's problem of starting a business might be solved when Robert and Everett, two local fashion designers, propose to Dan that they should have their own fashion line. At first the group doesn't match Dan's excitement but they eventually realize that this is an opportunity for them that might actually work. Sarah, however, isn't so excited about the idea and decides to start a side business delivering restaurant supplies to clients on the beach.
85	8	"Stand By Me?"	August 28, 1996
Joe's long-distance relationship is put to the test when he meets Leah in a fashion show. Despite expressing his love for Nic, he seems to like Leah's touchy-feely friendship. Meanwhile, Flora's relationship with Louis is also heading towards rough waters. It becomes obvious that Louis is getting tired of her antics when she is bitten by a poisonous spider and he refuses to take her to the hospital, believing that it's not as bad as she says it is.
86	9	"Say It Ain't So Joe"	September 4, 1996
Nicole visits the house and immediately makes a bad first impression with the roommates by complaining constantly about Joe. During dinner everybody is cracking jokes about Nicole. Mike expresses his frustration about the business. The roommates need to commit to this project or else he is out of the deal.
87	10	"Act Up!"	September 11, 1996
Joe and Nicki are in turmoil again. The roommates are concerned when Joe mysteriously disappears. When he returns, the two lovebirds are blissfully happy and vow to never again face such a crisis. Dan is finding that Arnie remaining in the closet is a growing problem. While Dan's brother is visiting, Dan and Arnie's relationship comes to a head. In the end, Dan agrees to be there for Arnie to help him through the process of coming out of the closet.
88	11	"Dependence Day"	September 18, 1996
Sarah's outside world collides with her world at home, thrusting the house into chaos. Flora gets fed up when three kids from the inner city come over for a visit and wreak havoc as they explore the house. Flora throws the kids out and gets into a heated argument with Sarah. In the end, Flora and Sarah learn to accept each other's differences. Meanwhile, Cynthia shows her frustration at the house due to her lack of independence, which she enjoyed back home.
89	12	"Act Out"	September 25, 1996
Melissa hasn't been herself lately and has been rude and condescending to everyone. She insults Sarah's friend even before they are formally introduced. In another incident, Melissa snags a personal letter that Dan wrote to a friend and reads it out loud to everyone leading to sn argument between Melissa and Dan. The two make up the next morning when they open up to each other in a sincere moment.
90	13	"Meet The Renzis!"	October 2, 1996
Dan is unnerved about his parents coming to Miami for a visit, but is surprised to discover that they are suddenly very accepting of his lifestyle. Dan's mom even spends time with his boyfriend, Arnie. Things don't work out quite as nicely for Mike and his sometime girlfriend Heather. She wants him to settle down and marry her, but he isn't ready to commit to one woman. They spend a weekend together in Boston, but Mike finds that he is as indecisive as ever.
91	14	"Resignation"	October 9, 1996
Business matters are coming to a halt. Joe and Flora are getting frustrated because no one else is doing any work, and they can't seem to make the decisions necessary to commit to a business. Sarah seizes the opportunity and presents a downscaled, easy to implement business plan: home delivery of cakes and treats. The other roommates are ready to get on board. Meanwhile, Cynthia spends some time coming to terms with the kind of men she's been dating, and decides to stay and help with the business. Joe's friend Joonmo shows up and helps Joe realize that he did the right thing by stepping back from the business.
92	15	"A Class Act"	October 16, 1996
Joe finds himself about to fail the one class that stands between him and an MBA from Fordham University in New York. Trying to complete the course from Miami, Joe must try to satisfy his professor, who is unhappy with the material he has turned in. Although Joe sends in a video about his crisis in leaving the business, he fails to impress his professor and in a last-ditch effort he flies to New York to give a presentation on the final day of class. With the help of a friend, he is able to make the grade. Meanwhile, Flora is engaged in a power struggle with Mark of Hospitality Purchasing over what his share in Delicious Deliveries should be. Mark and Flora maintain that each of them should have control over the business.
93	16	"Why Do Fools Fall in Love?"	October 23, 1996
Flora and Cynthia get into a spat when the dog bites Cynthia. Cynthia misses her family and the neighborhood in Oakland. Excited, she flies to Atlanta for a reunion with her mother and sisters. Dan also has a family encounter when he flies to Kansas to see his parents and brothers. He and his mom continue the frank discussion of Dan's sexuality that they started in Miami a few weeks earlier. When Dan returns, he makes a date with Johnny, a new romantic interest. Even though Arnie is jealous and hurt, Dan contends that he never committed to Arnie. On the business front, Joe wants to give his shares to the dog, prompting disbelief and criticism from the roommates.
94	17	"...Lies, and Videotape"	October 30, 1996
Sexual tensions are rising between the roommates. Mike brings home a waitress for some fun in the Jacuzzi, and the two are joined by Melissa. The threesome quickly moves upstairs to the privacy of the bathroom, but it is obvious to Dan, Flora and Sarah that something wild is going on inside. Sarah tries to push Flora through the bathroom window to get a better look, but the window breaks, shattering the mood. Later on, Melissa and Mike deny that anything happened.
95	18	"Liars and Lovers"	November 6, 1996
Dan is having trouble fitting in with the group, which Flora and Sarah attribute to him being a liar. Sarah calls him on his promised commitment to the business, which he can't seem to muster, while Flora confronts Dan in front of the others, calling him a liar to his face. Meanwhile, Joe returns to New York City for graduation and during the commencement ceremony, he proposes to his beloved. Upon returning to Miami, he announces his engagement at the surprise birthday party that Mike throws for him.
96	19	"Nature Calls"	November 13, 1996
Cynthia, Dan, Joe, Mike and Sarah fly to Staniel Cay in the Bahamas and take a camping vacation on a nearby island, "roughing it" with a gourmet cook and deluxe gear. The primary focus of the trip is experiencing nature while sailing, snorkeling and lounging on the beach. Even Cynthia, who is skeptical about the lack of facilities and is afraid of water, is won over by the beauty of the islands. The roommates bond during their time on the island. As Sarah's pictures prove to Flora and Melissa, it was a great vacation experience.
97	20	"Everyone Gets the Jackson"	November 20, 1996
Sarah is visited at the house by her friends from Kenosha, Wisconsin, one of whom, Hank, makes a home movie about life in the house. While filming, Flora repeatedly flashes the camera. When the movie is produced, Flora says she does not want the movie distributed to anyone. She claims she was on heavy medication and convinces Hank to sign a contract that the movie won't be released. Sarah confronts Melissa about appearing indifferent toward the rest of the housemates and not owning up to some of her actions in the past (in particular the threesome with Mike in the shower). All the housemates except for Flora appear to support Sarah in the argument. At the end of the episode, Melissa moves out of the house.
98	21	"None of Your Business"	November 27, 1996
With only days left before the deadline to start a business, Flora decides to pursue a coffee shop concept in addition to the dessert delivery service. She and partner Mark frantically try to get the necessary materials together, but Flora's power plays alienate the roommates. In the end, the investors decide that their conditions have not been met and that there will be no business. In the midst of all this, Dan finds out that he'll be moving to Milan to model, and has to break the news to his boyfriend Johnny.
99	22	"Ba-Bye"	December 4, 1996
As the roommates get ready to leave the Miami house, Cynthia receives a job offer in Miami that she can't pass up. Unfortunately, her schedule won't allow her to go back home at all, but she looks forward to her new job. Flora will be staying in Miami with Mitchell even though he initially stands her up at the airport. Dan is moving to Milan to pursue his modeling career, jeopardizing his relationship with Johnny, and they share an emotional good-bye. Mike, Sarah and Joe are all going their separate ways: Mike is going home to Jacksonville, Joe will be starting a new life with Nic, and Sarah is heading back to San Diego with her dog, Leroy.

== After filming ==
In 1998, Joe Patane published his memoirs about his experiences on the show, Livin' in Joe's World: Unauthorized, Uncut, and Unreal: The Memoirs of Joe Patane from the Miami Cast of MTV's The Real World. During The Real World Reunion 2000, the first reunion show that involved the Miami cast, he revealed that he and Nicole broke up, to which Mike expressed relief, because, as he told Joe, Nicole was a "bitch".

During the same reunion show, Flora Alekseyeun revealed that she and Mitchell got married. Joe revealed that he and Nicole broke up, to which Mike expressed relief, because, as he told Joe, Nicole was a "bitch". She appeared nude in the May 2002 issue of Playboy magazine, along with other alumnae of The Real World and Road Rules: Beth Stolarczyk, Veronica Portillo and Jisela Delgado. In 2020, she appeared on E! reality series Botched.

At the 2008 The Real World Awards Bash, Dan Renzi received a nomination for "Best Meltdown" because of his fight with Melissa, while Flora received one in the "Best Phonecall Gone Bad" category.

Cynthia Roberts appeared in "Floating Deck", a 2008 episode of the DIY Network show Yard Crashers, which depicted the renovation of her back yard.

After a career in runway and print fashion modeling, Dan Renzi became a model scout for a Chicago agency, a field researcher with the Los Angeles Department of Epidemiology and director of AIDS/HIV program at the Kansas City Gay and Lesbian Center. He has made appearances at celebrity Spring Break parties in the Bahamas. He has also contributed to the New York Post and the Miami New Times, and chronicles all his adventures at his own blog, How Was Your Day, Dan? He later became a registered nurse based in his home state of Kansas, and worked on the front lines of the COVID-19 pandemic in New York City.

After leaving WildStorm Productions, Sarah Becker worked for Disney Publishing. On June 23, 2026, TMZ.com reported that Becker's family had confirmed to that outlet that she had died by suicide at her home in Illinois, the week prior, at the age of 52. She had moved to the area in 2025 to take care of her ailing mother and sister, with the intention of returning to California, but come to struggled with mental health in recent months, a condition exacderbated by a skateboarding accident. Colleagues who offered public tributes to her included DC Comics Publisher Jim Lee, who had hired her at WildStorm Productions when he was the owner of that studio, and artist J. Scott Campbell, who worked with her during their early days at WildStorm, having once drawn Becker as a character in a scene in a WildStorm comic.

=== The Challenge ===
Cast member	Seasons of The Challenge	Other appearances
Sarah Becker	—N/a	—N/a
Dan Renzi	Extreme Challenge, Battle of the Sexes, The Inferno II	—N/a
Melissa Padrón	—N/a	—N/a
Joe Patane	—N/a	—N/a
Cynthia Roberts	Road Rules: All Stars, Battle of the Sexes 2	The Challenge: All Stars (season 3)
Flora Alekseyeun	Battle of the Seasons (2002)	The Challenge: All Stars (season 4)
Mike Lambert	Challenge 2000, Battle of the Seasons (2002)	—N/a
