= Jake Bronstein =

American magazine editor (born 1978)

- Born: June 13, 1978 (age 47); Philadelphia, Pennsylvania, U.S.
- Occupations: Marketing innovation expert and entrepreneur
- Known for: Blogging, Road Rules, FHM, pranks
- Spouse: Kristina Hoge (2010–present)

Jake Bronstein (born June 13, 1978), is a marketer, entrepreneur, Internet personality, and blogger. He was an editor of the US edition of FHM, a men's magazine. Bronstein markets himself as a "fun evangelist," and provides consulting services to that end through his marketing agency GiantMINIATURE.

== Career ==
Bronstein appeared in season four of the television program Road Rules, Road Rules: Islands, at age 18, and two years later published his first feature article in Maxim. At 21 he signed on for FHM, but took a brief break a few years later to co-host G4 Tech TV's Video Game Vixens. He also documented his sex life for Glamour and wrote a book about his sexual activities under the alias "Allen Jake Bronstein" He later worked in marketing, and founded a blog named Zoomdoggle with colleague Josh Spear.

In 2009, Bronstein and Craig Zucker noticed rare earth magnetic spheres on YouTube and repackaged them as a popular magnetic desk toy called Buckyballs. In July 2012, the Consumer Product Safety Commission filed an administrative complaint against Buckyballs and similar magnetic toy companies, alleging that the balls present a safety risk when swallowed.

In 2012, Bronstein founded the apparel company Flint and Tinder, which was acquired by Huckberry in 2016.

In 2018, Bronstein became BuzzFeed's Head of Partner Innovation. In this role, he paired Tasty with LG Ovens for a cookie subscription program, launched a 24-hour takeover of the BuzzFeed homepage to showcase Bumble's virtual first dating functionality, opened a New York themed pizza parlor with Chase bank, the NY Knicks, and Run DMC that would be named the 2019 Shortie Awards Best Location Based Experience, and form the Adobe x BuzzFeed "Make The Feed" partnership, described by Adobe as their "most creative ever."

=== Publicity stunts ===
Bronstein has been involved in a number of publicity stunts, such as bathing in the Bryant Park Fountain, taking advantage of a loophole to get into the NBA draft, auctioning on eBay the lead singer position in his band, offering himself for marriage, freeing a fish into New York's East River, launching a 50 Dates in 50 States quest by soliciting invites from women on the web, and offering 1,000 strangers a hand-written love letter.
