= Road Rules: USA – The Second Adventure =

- Season 2
- Starring: Christian Breivik; Devin Elston; Effie Perez; Emily Bailey; Timmy Beggy
- No. of episodes: 17

Release
- Original network: MTV
- Original release: July 15 – October 21, 1996

Season chronology
- ← Previous; Road Rules: USA – The First Adventure Next → Road Rules: Europe

Road Rules: USA – The Second Adventure is the second season of the MTV reality television series Road Rules. It first aired on MTV on July 15, 1996. They started their journey in Key West, Florida.

== Cast ==
Cast member	Age^{1}	Hometown
Christian Breivik	22	Nesøya, Norway
Devin Elston	18	Cleveland, OH
Efrat "Effie" Perez	22	Meitar, Israel
Emily Bailey	18	Flora, IL
Timmy Beggy	23	Pittsburgh, PA

- ^Note 1: At time of filming.

== Missions ==
Episode #	Mission Name	Completed	Notes
1	Tag a Shark	Completed	Five cast members meet in Key West, Florida for the first time. Mark and Kit from the first season surprise the cast and give them the keys to their Winnebago. Effie's smoking habit begins to rub people the wrong way. On the journey to an airport in Fort Lauderdale, Timmy's personality and sense of humor put everyone at ease while Emily and Devin begin to bond. The tiny airplane frightens Emily, but they soon land in the rural Bimini Islands. The cast meet with Doc Gruber and discover they will be helping research sharks. Christian's language and cultural barrier causes problems with his fitting into the group. Emily has to face her fears of deep water in order to complete the mission - the first part of which makes the cast jump into the water to witness a feeding frenzy of sharks, leaving everyone in awe. Devin begins to feel homesick for his little sister. The end of the episode culminates in Doc Gruber telling the cast they have located an eight-foot shark and they will go out to see it.
2	Steal The 8-Ball	Completed	The cast takes part in tagging and measuring large sharks that are captured by the research team; Christian also has a direct part in releasing one back to the ocean, and they receive their first "Road Key" which puts together a puzzle in their Winnebago after they complete all the missions. The cast goes out to a bar to have a good time and celebrate their first mission. For Devin, it's his first time drinking ever and everyone takes part in a tradition to hang their underwear on the ceiling of the bar. However, their indiscriminate spending makes them worried the next day. Emily spends some one-on-one time bonding and flirting with one of the shark researchers, but Devin is protective of her. The cast shares sentimental good byes with the entire research crew and then travels to Miami for their next mission: steal the eight ball from the pool table of the Real World: Miami house. Timmy's humorous approach to the mission causes conflict between him and serious Effie, but the cast comes together and decides to pose as maintenance workers. The episode ends with Timmy attempting to get the Real World cast's attention.
3	Waterskiing	Completed	Posing as maintenance workers, the cast successfully steals the 8-ball from the pool table while confusing and irritating the Real World: Miami cast. On the way to Okahumpka, Florida for their next mission, Devin and Effie come into conflict over her driving skills. The cast decides to come together and agree on a budget, but the conversation quickly devolves into a heated argument. Timmy's leadership eventually resolves the issue. The next mission involves the cast participating in various waterskiing events. Effie is extremely nervous due to her fear of the water and both she and Devin struggle with their events, but they ultimately finish the mission. Emily and Devin bond, with Emily referring to him as her "first black friend". The cast's next clue leads them to New Orleans, Louisiana.
4	Crew a Mardi Gras Float	Completed	Effie struggles with homesickness and getting along with the other cast members. In New Orleans, the cast meets with prominent members of the Krewe of Orpheus, including Harry Conick Jr., in preparation for riding in their Mardi Gras parade. They enjoy the festivities of Mardi Gras and the French Quarter before attempting to buy beads for their own parade. The exorbitant price makes them balk due to their lack of spending money but they are able to negotiate a deal. Devin and Emily's bond grows stronger, but Effie and Timmy get into an argument about her smoking habit. While riding in the parade, the guys are especially ecstatic about female tourists' custom of lifting their shirts for beads. However, Emily takes offense to the behavior and does not enjoy herself. The cast's next clue leads them to Columbus, Mississippi. On the way, Effie has a meltdown when her driving and navigational skills are questioned. In Mississippi, the cast discovers their next mission is to take part in a Civil War reenactment. As a black man, Devin feels uncomfortable in the Confederate-sympathizing camp.
5	Civil War Reenactment	Completed	Though Devin considers not doing the mission due to his discomfort with the conservative Southerners, he eventually decides to take part. The cast participates in various Civil War reenactments, such as Emily and Christian guarding the camp all night, Emily and Effie going to a tea party, and everyone taking part in the mock battle. In order to retrieve their next clue, the cast attends a Confederate ball and dances with everyone at the ball until one of the dancers gives Emily the clue which leads the cast to Emily's hometown of Flora, Illinois. On the way, small town Emily learns about black culture and crime through Devin. However, when the cast stops in Nashville and Emily ignores Devin in favor of her ex-boyfriend, Devin grows jealous and he later argues with Emily about her behavior.
6	Skydive	Completed	The group arrives at Emily's house and she is reunited with her family. The cast is given a large, home-cooked feast and they also receive a clue to their next mission: skydiving. Emily discovers her oldest sister is engaged, which brings up emotional attachments to her previous boyfriend of 3 years. She ends up having several passionate and upsetting conversations with him about their emotions, but Devin comforts her and gives her advice. The next day, the entire cast successfully skydives and marvel at the experience. Their next clue leads them to the University of Memphis.
7	Register Voters	Completed	As the cast departs Emily's home, Timmy cuts his hair and the cast earns their second Road Key. In Memphis, Effie barters her way into renting a nice hotel room for the group. Everyone enjoys a hot bath and Christian ends up drinking and streaking in the hallway. While at a club, Timmy becomes friends with the owner and ends up bartending for the night to make extra money for the group. The next day, Effie receives news of a bombing in Israel which upsets her and she passionately educates Emily about the struggles of war. The cast arrives at the University of Memphis and receives their next mission: registering people to vote. Whoever registers the most people wins a dinner at a fancy restaurant. The number of people who are not registered to vote surprises Effie, who says nearly everyone in Israel votes. Christian's unique strategy involves convincing a team of college students to help him register more people, which leads him to a win. He brings one of the students to dinner with the rest of the cast, and ends up questioning Emily and Devin about their budding yet ambiguous relationship. They admit to a romance forming between them. At dinner, the cast receives their next clue which they perceive has to do with Elvis Presley. When the check comes for their dinner, the cast realizes they are unable to pay for it and work in the kitchen washing dishes to pay it off instead. Devin begins to feel tension towards the group for bringing up his and Emily's relationship, while afterward Emily and Effie go to a club to let loose and have fun.
8	n/a	n/a	The cast receives notice from an Elvis impersonator that this next mission will actually be a job for them to earn money, so they decide to spend all the money in their group fund. Effie starts separating herself from the group. When the group is about to leave for their job, Effie disappears which causes chaos and anger to ensue. When she returns, she and Devin get into a heated argument. For the job, Timmy and Christian dress up like Elvis and Devin takes pictures of them with customers at a restaurant, while Emily and Effie have a miserable time working in the kitchen. While working, Emily and Effie argue over her disappearance earlier. However, she makes up with both Emily and Devin later.
9	Compete in a Rodeo	Completed	The cast arrives in Sulphur Springs, Texas for their next mission: participating in a rodeo. Though Effie is initially hesitant, she ultimately enjoys and is successful at her event, horseback precision riding. Devin plays the part of a rodeo clown. Christian becomes upset when he does poorly in his event, bareback riding. Emily is initially fearful of her event, saddle bronc, but successfully completes it. Timmy takes on the hardest challenge: bull riding. In order for the cast to get their next clue, they chase down a cow and untie the clue from its neck. The cast then drives to Austin, Texas and has some trouble finding the person in charge of their next mission. Emily and Devin become insulted by Christian's constant questioning, thinking that he doubts their intelligence. However, they apologize and squash the tension before it escalates. The cast begins their next mission, compiling a segment for a local news station. The arduous task nearly overwhelms the cast as they have no previous experience of journalism or editing. In the end, they pull it off just in time and receive their next clue telling them to go to New Mexico, as well as the third Road Key.
9	Produce TV News	Completed	
10	Compete in Snowbox Derby Race	Completed	The cast arrives in New Mexico and learns of their next mission, building and competing in a snowbox derby race down a mountain. As the cast tries to come together to decide what to build, the guys and the girls butt heads. Effie's sour attitude once again rubs everyone the wrong way, causing yet another major argument between her and Devin. However, despite Effie disagreeing with the group's idea, she puts in the most work to build the snowbox - an artistic picnic table on skis. During the race, the cast pulls a prank on the townspeople by throwing eggs and spraying fire extinguishers as they ski down the mountain. After the race, their next clue leads them to Phoenix for a baseball game, but the cast worries about their dire financial situation.
11	Locate Next Clue	n/a	As the cast travels to Phoenix, various misfortunes befall them. They run out of money, Christian falls sick, Devin gets into a disagreement with his ex-girlfriend which brings up jealousy issues for Emily, and after sneaking into a hotel pool, Timmy reminisces on how he had been fired from his dream job after being arrested for public lewdness. In Phoenix, the cast (minus Christian due to his sickness) takes on various jobs at a ballpark, including selling peanuts, maintaining the grass, helping with equipment, and singing the National Anthem. There they are given their next mission: to locate their next clue by finding a certain GPS coordinate. The cast goes camping, where romantic Emily and realist Devin don't exactly see eye-to-eye when it comes to their relationship, especially when he brushes her off to call his ex-girlfriend. Emily begins to feel turmoil when she realizes she may be more attached to him than she wanted to be, and tension begins to arise between the couple.
12	Locate Next Clue	Completed	Emily and Devin get into an intense argument as they try to establish the relationship between them especially in regards to Devin and his actions toward his ex-girlfriend. The cast drives to Moab, Utah and ride bikes in the middle of the remote desert to locate their next clue. That night, Christian's dad surprises the group by meeting them for dinner all the way from Norway. After her argument with Devin, Emily reflects on the meaning of love. She later gets into yet another argument with him over their relationship. Effie reprimands Devin for the way he treats Emily and offers Emily consolation and advice. Finally, Emily and Devin make up and mend their relationship.
13	Fighter Jet Dogfighting	Completed	Effie temporarily leaves the group to go to a synagogue to observe the Jewish holiday of Passover. The rest of the cast goes to Las Vegas and gambles, but Emily and Devin get kicked out of the casino for being underage. When Timmy and Christian are late in picking up Effie from the synagogue, she becomes angry. The next mission involves the cast flying planes and dogfighting each other. Effie experiences motion sickness and cannot do the mission for long, causing her to become upset and act harshly toward the others. Emily dominates the competition with her fearless airplane flying, and she defeats Devin, Timmy, and Christian. The cast earns another Road Key.
14	n/a	n/a	While traveling to California, the cast runs into trouble at an agricultural checkpoint. The cast takes in the sights and sounds of Hollywood. Their next job is to help assist now-late actor Chris Farley with the filming of a movie. Effie and Chris bond over their outrageous personalities. Emily's jealousy of Effie and Chris causes Effie to become angry and go off on Emily. Emily, in turn, voices her frustrations but Devin calms her down. Later, Emily and Effie defuse the tension between them by joking around. The cast earns much-needed money and figures out their next mission will involve bungee jumping.
15	Bungee Jumping	Completed	The cast goofs off as they reminisce about the adventures they went through on the trip and leave the Winnebago for the last time. They then fly to Anchorage, Alaska. Devin and Emily continue to struggle with their relationship as they consider their options after they go back home; Emily is more invested but Devin just wants to be friends. Emily becomes upset at his lack of commitment. The cast's next mission is a 220-foot bungee jump. Effie is the most nervous and has a lot of trouble preparing herself for the jump.
16	n/a	n/a	Effie becomes too frightened and lets everyone else bungee jump first, but in order to get their final Road Key and handsome reward the group must choose a fifth person to jump. Effie finally faces her fears and jumps, leading to a beautiful moment for her. The cast comes together for one last dinner, where they reminisce on things like Timmy and Christian's close friendship, Devin and Effie's arguments, Emily and Effie's sister-like relationship, and the overall bond of the entire cast. Devin and Emily share an emotional good-bye; even though Emily expresses love for Devin and interest in continuing their relationship, Devin just wants to remain friends. The cast drives to a glacier in order to receive their handsome reward: The 1997 Honda Civic Coupe.

== Episodes ==
No. overall	No. in season	Title	Original release date
16	1	"Hello, My Name Is..."	July 15, 1996
17	2	"Your Mission Is..."	July 15, 1996
18	3	"Walking on Water..."	July 22, 1996
19	4	"Beads and Resentment"	July 29, 1996
20	5	"Love and the Battlefield"	August 5, 1996
21	6	"Bird's Eye View"	August 12, 1996
22	7	"Choose or Lose"	August 19, 1996
23	8	"Elvis Time"	August 26, 1996
24	9	"Cowboys and Newspeople"	September 2, 1996
25	10	"It's Raining, It's Snowing"	September 9, 1996
26	11	"At the Old Ball Game"	September 16, 1996
27	12	"Bikes and Parents"	September 23, 1996
28	13	"Matzah and Dogfights"	September 30, 1996
29	14	"Pulling a Farley"	October 7, 1996
30	15	"For Sale and Goodbye"	October 14, 1996
31	16	"When Chickens Learn to Fly"	October 21, 1996

== After filming ==
=== The Challenge ===
Cast member	Seasons of The Challenge
Christian Breivik	Extreme Challenge
Devin Elston	—N/a
Efrat "Effie" Perez	—N/a
Emily Bailey	Extreme Challenge, Battle of the Seasons (2002), Battle of the Sexes
Timmy Beggy	Battle of the Seasons (2002), The Inferno, The Gauntlet 2, The Inferno 3
