= Road Rules: Europe =

- Season 3
- Starring: Antoine de Bouverie; Chris Melling; Belou Den Tex; Michelle Parma; Patrice Bouédibéla
- No. of episodes: 13

Release
- Original network: MTV
- Original release: January 6 – March 31, 1997

Season chronology
- ← Previous; Road Rules: USA – The Second Adventure Next → Road Rules: Islands

Road Rules: Europe is the third season of the MTV reality television series Road Rules. It took place exclusively on the continent of Europe, the first time the series ever ventured outside the United States. This was also the only cast in Road Rules history in which non-American citizens outnumbered American citizens. It premiered on MTV on January 6, 1997 and concluded its run on March 31, 1997.

== Cast ==
Cast member	Age^{1}	Hometown
Antoine de Bouverie	21	Brussels, Belgium
Chris Melling	20	Swampscott, MA
Elizabeth "Belou" Den Tex	19	Amsterdam, Netherlands
Michelle Parma	21	Dallas, TX
Patrice Bouédibéla	21	Berlin, Germany

- ^Note 1: At time of filming.

== Tasks list ==
Episode #	Mission Name	Completed	Notes
1	Running With The Bulls	Completed	The two Americans, Chris and Michelle, meet up at Chris' house and then travel to Barcelona. Along the way, they bond as they discuss their outlooks on love and relationships. In Barcelona, the European cast members meet up with the Americans. Christian from the second season surprises the cast with their Winnebago and takes all their money and credit cards, as per Road Rules tradition. The cast unravels their first clue, which leads them to Pamplona for the Running of the Bulls. Patrice is especially afraid but everyone successfully takes part in the exhilarating mission. Afterward, the group enjoys Spain and begins to bond over dinner, deep conversation, body shots, and light shows.
2	Rig and Detonate 2 Tons of Pyrotechnics	Completed	After a night of drinking, Michelle and Chris show affection to each other, as do Belou and Antoine. Antoine's behavior characterizes him as a loose cannon to the other cast members - first he drives recklessly and later he shaves his head. Later, Antoine grows angry and mocks the other cast members' driving and navigation skills. Michelle attributes his attitude change to an attempt at distancing himself from Belou, as well as trying to put himself in control. The cast's next mission involves setting up and detonating two tons of fireworks for a pyrotechnic show. After a long day of hard work, Chris is the lucky one chosen to detonate the fireworks and the cast enjoys the spectacular show.
3	Canyoning	Completed	The cast travels to Millau for their next mission. Belou laments the growing rift between her and Antoine. She also struggles with her relationship with her boyfriend back in Amsterdam and tearfully confides in Michelle. The cast prepares for their next mission by rappeling down a mountain, where Patrice faces his fear of heights. This mission takes the cast "body-rafting", walking, and rappeling down a river through a canyon. Later, Belou and Chris share a frank conversation about their views on love: Chris reveals his inability to fall in love, while Belou admits her inclination to fall in love frequently. She concedes that her fascination with Antoine is what led her to become attached to him in the first place. The cast spends their next few days enjoying the laidback atmosphere of Millau before receiving their next clue.
4	n/a	n/a	The cast balks at the smell of their neglected refrigerator and come up with solutions for it. Michelle crashes the Winnebago (which is affectionately named Pepe) but the damage is minor. The cast arrives in Cannes and head to their first job of the trip to earn some money: cleaning an expensive yacht for a party. Belou and Antoine continue to butt heads, leading to a short argument. Later, the cast discovers the party on the yacht is actually for themselves. They collectively find ten people on the street and invite them back to the yacht. The party leads to a romantic atmosphere between the cast mates and some of their guests, though nothing comes from it.
5	Race for a Million	Completed	The cast drives to Lake Como in Italy where they stay at a water-ski club. Their mission involves competing for one million Italian lira (about $550) by racing water ski enthusiasts in two legs of water skiing, one leg of kayaking, and one leg of rowboating. During practice for the mission, Belou blows up after she perceives Antoine trying to take control of the group again and everyone giving into his orders. Tension thus arises between Belou and the rest of the group as they bicker throughout the day. Belou eventually erupts into tears of anger and frustration and threatens to not participate in the mission. Eventually, she comes around and agrees to it. However, the cast loses to the experienced athletes.
6	Cook and Serve a Gourmet Meal	Completed	After a short breakdown by Belou over a lost ID, the cast travels to Milan where they abandon Pepe and board a train to Venice. Once there, the cast is amazed by the history and beauty of the city. Their clue leads them to compliment random strangers until they find one who gives them another clue. After a mix up with bags, Belou breaks down once more and intensely lashes out at the other cast members. The next day, when Belou perceives Antoine being rude to her, she violently lashes out again, hitting him and attempting to stab him with a butter knife. In retaliation, Antoine grabs Belou and tries to shove her in a canal. Belou, however, is relieved to see Antoine show emotion. Immediately after, the cast goes to their next mission: cooking a five star meal for a master chef's party. Tension is in the air due to the fight, but the cast completes their mission and pulls off a successful party.
7	Boxing	Completed	The cast moves onto Belou's hometown, Amsterdam. Belou visits her boyfriend Steve's house but the two end up arguing. The cast leaves due to feeling uncomfortable with Steve's animosity and choose to stay in a hostel instead. Later, they discover their mission is to participate in boxing. They train intensely for several hours and then pair up for their matches. Chris and Patrice have an intense battle, but Patrice eventually tires out. Michelle and Belou surprise everyone with their ferocity. Chris, though having a considerable size advantage, lets Antoine win during their match so as not to bruise Antoine's pride. After the mission, Belou and Steve argue again and Michelle shares doubts about the longevity of their relationship.
8	Seal Rescue and Release	Completed	The cast travels to Pieterburen for their next mission: rescuing and releasing seals at a rehabilitation center. They learn about seal behavior and take part in feeding and caring for the injured and orphaned seals. At the end of the mission, they take part in the release of several seals. The release touches everyone. Back in Amsterdam, the cast laments about their lack of money leading to Chris, Patrice, and Michelle trying to wash windows to earn some spare change. Belou separates herself from the group to spend time with her boyfriend Steve but the relationship begins to feel unfulfilling.
9	Find the Winnie	Completed	The cast arrives in Paris after struggling to find food with no money. In Paris, they discover their next job will be to act as models for a runway fashion show. Belou and Michelle give Chris a new hair-do for the fashion show, which proves to be transformative. The cast gets dolled up by a makeup and hair department and Antoine's hair is dyed red. The fashion show is chaotic but everyone pulls it off in the end and they receive a much-needed paycheck. Later, they also receive a clue with the GPS coordinates to their RV Pepe, with their next mission being to find the Winnie. After a whirlwind day running around Paris (including a trip up the Eiffel Tower), the cast finally reunites with Pepe. While on the town for a night out, Michelle strikes up a conversation with a man that Belou is interested in, causing Belou to freak out again and verbally berate Michelle.
10	Survive French Cuisine	Completed	Belou feels a separation from the rest of the cast, and starts a short romance with a man named Pablo. Jealous of Belou's capability to fall in love so easily, Chris writes her a letter detailing his feelings, but Belou does not understand the meaning of the letter. The cast discovers they will be staying in a castle in Tours, France for their next mission. Belou and Michelle do not appreciate the degrading comments made by one of the mission leaders, and later the mission leaders take offense at the cast's loud behavior. For their next mission, the cast samples many different French foods, most of which they find disgusting. Belou breaks up with Steve over the phone, causing her to become emotionally distraught. Belou then confronts the rest of the cast about the tension between her and the group, leading to a heated argument. Distressed and upset, Belou attempts to jump out of a window but Patrice thwarts her. The argument eventually turns into an emotional outpouring as Chris unveils his feelings toward love. The cast takes part in a scavenger hunt for their next clue, leading them to the beach.
11	Surf Competition	Completed	The cast meets two professional surfers who show them the night life scene. Later, they learn how to surf in order to take part in a surfing competition. Patrice decides to go out on a limb and dye his hair blonde. The other cast members observe a change in his overall demeanor for the better. The cast takes part in the surf competition, with Antoine taking the winning prize of a brand new surfboard. Belou and Antoine's relationship begins to improve and they start to get along better. The cast then moves on to Lourdes, France for their next mission: bungee jumping off a 300-foot-tall bridge. The cast faces their fears and everyone successfully jumps.
11	Bungee Jumping	Completed	
12	Paragliding	Completed	Chris and Michelle share a flirtatious bond, but it does not move further than friendship. The cast arrives in Ibiza for their next job: working as party promoters. However, they are shocked to find out they will be advertising on a nude beach. Later, the cast gets paid for their work and are surprised again at the intensity of the clubs in Ibiza. Chris and Michelle both hook up with different people while at the party, leading to jealousy on Chris' part. The cast takes scooters to show up for their next mission, but Michelle repeatedly crashes hers and suffers a minor injury, which is cared for by Chris. The cast takes part in their penultimate mission, paragliding, in which everyone has a great time participating.
13	Tomatina	Completed	The cast travels to Bunol, Spain and discover there is a tomato festival going on. The wild party of drinking, dancing, and ripping off clothes invigorates the cast members. Eventually, tons of tomatoes are released into the city and essentially a giant food fight occurs. Following their final mission at the tomato festival, the cast travels to Barcelona to retrieve their handsome reward - home entertainment systems and $1000 cash for each person. The cast shares a final dinner together and reminisces on the good and difficult memories from their trip, the variety of missions, and the lessons they learned.

== Episodes ==
No. overall	No. in season	Title	Original release date
33	1	"Bonjour Roadies"	January 6, 1997
34	2	"Love Hurts"	January 13, 1997
35	3	"On the Edge of Your Fears"	January 20, 1997
36	4	"The Contest"	January 27, 1997
37	5	"Water Games"	February 3, 1997
38	6	"Knives on the Canal"	February 10, 1997
39	7	"In the Ring"	February 17, 1997
40	8	"Giving a Helping Flipper"	February 24, 1997
41	9	"Strutting Their Stuff"	March 3, 1997
42	10	"Out the Window"	March 10, 1997
43	11	"Sex Wax on the Beach"	March 17, 1997
44	12	"Flying with the Birds"	March 24, 1997
45	13	"Tomatoes on the Mind"	March 31, 1997

== After filming ==
In 2002, Michelle Parma died in a car accident along with her cousin.

=== The Challenge ===
Cast member	Seasons of The Challenge
Antoine de Bouverie	Battle of the Sexes
Chris Melling	Battle of the Seasons (2002)
Elizabeth "Belou" Den Tex	Battle of the Seasons (2002)
Michelle Parma	Extreme Challenge
Patrice Bouédibéla	—N/a
