= Road Rules: USA – The First Adventure =

- Season 1
- Starring: Allison Jones; Carlos Jackson; Kit Hoover; Mark Long; Shelly Spottedhorse
- No. of episodes: 15

Release
- Original network: MTV
- Original release: July 19 – October 25, 1995

Season chronology
- Next → Road Rules: USA – The Second Adventure

Road Rules: USA – The First Adventure is the inaugural season of the MTV reality television series Road Rules. The show featured five young people traveling the country, completing various tasks to get their next clue to their next mission.

== Cast ==
Cast member	Age^{1}	Description
Allison Jones	21	Allison is a pre-med student who graduated from Columbia College in 1995 and is applying to medical schools. She lives in Huntington, New York. She loves dancing and Kermit the Frog.
Carlos "Los" Jackson	21	Los is from Washington, D.C., and is a college student at Howard University, aspiring to be a cinematographer.
Kit Hoover	24	Kit is from Atlanta, Georgia, and graduated from the University of North Carolina in 1993. She claims she's had 10 jobs in the past 2 years.
Mark Long	23	Mark is from Satellite Beach, Florida, and is a 1994 graduate from the University of Florida, where he was a part of the Sigma Phi Epsilon fraternity. He can bench press 315 pounds. Viewers originally saw Mark try out as Puck's replacement on The Real World: San Francisco.
Shelly Spottedhorse	19	Shelly is from Oklahoma City, Oklahoma, and graduated from high school in 1994. She is proud of her Kiowa and Creek heritage. She also has six tattoos and wants more.

- ^Note 1: At time of filming.

== Task list ==
#	Mission Name	Completed
1	Landsailing Race	Completed
2	Win the Key to the City	Completed
3	Dogsledding	Completed
4	Visit Shelly's hometown	Completed
5	Job at Kleibert's Farm	Completed
6	Find the Father of Jazz and Spend the Night with Him	Completed
7	Lend a Hand for Habitat for Humanity	Completed
8	Visit 'Hotlanta' and See some Relatives	Completed
9	Job at Moon Tillett Fish Company	Completed
10	Talk to the Clown of Madison Square Garden and Appear on Television	Completed
11	Marine Training Courses	Completed
12	White Water Rafting	Completed
13	Cop For A Day	Completed
14	Open for Van Halen	Completed
15	Visit the Rockford Speedway for a Smash-Up Time	Completed
16	Skydiving	Completed
17	Job at Dine-A-Ville Motel	Completed
18	Survive!	Completed
19	Spa	Completed

== Episodes ==
No. overall	No. in season	Title	Original release date
1	1	"Sailing With No Water"	July 19, 1995
2	2	"Going to the Dogs"	July 26, 1995
3	3	"Home on Oklahoma"	August 2, 1995
4	4	"Alligator Ice Cream"	August 9, 1995
5	5	"Sleeping on Buddy"	August 16, 1995
6	6	"Nudes and Nails"	August 23, 1995
7	7	"Baldy and Fish"	August 30, 1995
8	8	"Making a Clown of Yourself"	September 6, 1995
9	9	"Boot and Shoot"	September 13, 1995
10	10	"All Right Nothing to See"	September 20, 1995
11	11	"Sammy and the Roadies"	September 27, 1995
12	12	"A Crash Up & Bang Up Time"	October 4, 1995
13	13	"Meeting the Stoned Presidents"	October 11, 1995
14	14	"Skydiving in Antacid"	October 18, 1995
15	15	"Tit and Tat"	October 25, 1995

== After filming ==
In 2015, Kit Hoover and Mark Long reunited on Access Hollywood for the 20 years anniversary of the series.

In 2020, Mark Long started asking his followers if they'd be interested in seeing former cast members of The Challenge coming together for a new version of the series. After his idea went viral, he announced a partnership with Bunim/Murray Productions to further develop his project. The Challenge: All Stars eventually premiered on Paramount+ on April 1, 2021. The series was renewed for a second season, which premiered on November 11, 2021. Long also partnered up with Objective Media Group to develop a cooking competition series. In 2022, he competed on the 24th season of Worst Cooks in America.

=== The Challenge ===
Cast member	Seasons of The Challenge	Other appearances
Allison Jones	—N/a	—N/a
Carlos "Los" Jackson	Challenge 2000	—N/a
Kit Hoover	—N/a	—N/a
Mark Long	Challenge, Battle of the Sexes, Battle of the Sexes 2, The Gauntlet 2, The Duel II, Battle of the Exes, Battle of the Eras	The Challenge: All Stars (season 1), The Challenge: All Stars (season 3)
Shelly Spottedhorse	—N/a	—N/a

Note: Mark served as a co-host on Real World/Road Rules Challenge: Battle of the Seasons
