= Road Rules =

Television series

- Genre: Reality
- Created by: Mary-Ellis Bunim; Jonathan Murray
- Country of origin: United States
- Original language: English
- No. of seasons: 14
- No. of episodes: 220

Production
- Executive producers: Joey Carson; Jonathan Murray; Rick de Oliveira; Rick Telles; Bruce Toms
- Running time: 30 minutes
- Production company: Bunim/Murray Productions

Original release
- Network: MTV
- Release: July 19, 1995 – May 9, 2007

Related
- The Real World; The Challenge; The Challenge: All Stars

Road Rules is a reality show developed as a sister show of MTV's The Real World. The series ran for 14 seasons, from July 19, 1995 to May 9, 2007.

The series followed five to six strangers between the ages of 18 and 24, stripped of their money and restricted to a life in an RV, traveling from location to location. The strangers were guided by a set of clues and missions to complete at each location. It was nominated for an Emmy Award in 2001.

The series was a pioneer in travel/adventure/reward reality television (together with Mark Burnett's Eco-Challenge productions). Road Rules was created by Jonathan Murray and Mary-Ellis Bunim of Bunim/Murray Productions. After Bunim died of cancer in early 2004, the show went into hiatus for three years.

The idea of Road Rules came to mind when Real World castmates Jon Brennan, Tami Akbar and Dominic Griffin traveled in an RV across the United States to get to their The Real World: Los Angeles house in the first two episodes of the second season. Bunim-Murray began working on the show soon after the third season of The Real World, and finally debuted in 1995.

The show generated a spin-off series, also broadcast by MTV, known as The Challenge (originally known as Road Rules: All Stars before being renamed Real World/Road Rules Challenge after both its precursors), which is still in production. The spin-off series is mostly cast-contestant dependent on both Road Rules and The Real World as it combines contestants from various seasons of both precursors. The Challenge has surpassed both Road Rules and The Real World.

In 2001, MTV agreed to license off-net syndication rights to the series to October Moon Television.

In 2021, it was announced that a revamped version of Road Rules would air on Paramount+. However, this never materialized.

== Seasons ==
An asterisk (*) indicates the cast member was voted off the show or lost a season 14 face-off and did not make it to the end. A caret (^) indicates the cast member was required to leave the show.

Season		Year	Cast members						Handsome Reward
1	USA – The First Adventure	1995	Kit Hoover	Carlos "Los" Jackson	Allison Jones	Mark Long	Shelly Spottedhorse		European Trip
2	USA – The Second Adventure	1996	Emily Bailey	Tim Beggy	Christian Breivik	Devin Elston	Effie Perez		1997 Honda Civic Coupe
3	Europe	1997	Patrice Bouédibéla	Antoine de Bouverie	Elizabeth "Belou" Den Tex	Chris Melling	Michelle Parma		Home entertainment center and $1000 cash
4	Islands	1997	Jake Bronstein	Kalle Dedolph	Vincent Forcier	Oscar Hernandez	Erika Ruen		Enrollment and Tuition on Semester at Sea Program
5	Northern Trail	1998	Jon Holmes	Roni Martin	Tara McDaniel	Noah Rickun	Dan Setzler	Anne Wharton	Trip to Greece
6	Down Under	1998	Kefla Hare	Shayne McBride	Susie Meister	Christina Pazsitzky	Chadwick Pelletier	Bronwen "Piggy" Thomas	Choice of Seadoo, Motorbike or Harley
7	Latin America	1999	Josh Florence	Abe Ingersoll	Brian Lancaster	Sarah Martinez	Gladys Sanabria^	Holly Shand	Volkswagen New Beetle
8	Semester at Sea	1999	Yes Duffy	Pawel Litwinski	Ayanna Mackins	Pua Medeiros	Veronica Portillo	Shawn Sealy	Apple iMac
9	Maximum Velocity Tour	2000	Holly Brentson	Msaada Nia	Kathryn Omeg	James Orlando	Theo Von Kurnatowski	Laterrian Wallace	Cumulative Cash Prize on Cobalt Credit Card
10	The Quest	2001	Ellen Cho	Jisela Delgado*	Blair Herter	Adam Larson	Steve Meinke	Sophia Pasquis	Suzuki Grand Vitara
10	The Quest	2001	Ellen Cho	Katie Doyle	Blair Herter	Adam Larson	Steve Meinke	Sophia Pasquis	Suzuki Grand Vitara
11	Campus Crawl	2002	Sarah Greyson*	Eric Jones	Shane Landrum	Rachel Robinson	Kendal Sheppard	Darrell Taylor	Trip around the World
11	Campus Crawl	2002	Raquel Duran	Eric Jones	Shane Landrum	Rachel Robinson	Kendal Sheppard	Darrell Taylor	Trip around the World
12	South Pacific	2003	Abram Boise^	Mary Beth Decker	David Giuntoli	Donell Langham*	Christena Pyle	Cara Zavaleta*	2004 Subaru Impreza WRX
12	South Pacific	2003	Chris Graebe	Mary Beth Decker	David Giuntoli	Jeremy Blossom	Christena Pyle	Tina Barta	2004 Subaru Impreza WRX
13	X-Treme	2004	Kina Dean*	Danny Dias*	Derrick Kosinski	Patrick Maloney	Ibis Nieves*	Jodi Weatherton	2005 Subaru Impreza WRX
13	X-Treme	2004	Angela Trimbur	Nick Haggart	Derrick Kosinski	Patrick Maloney	Jillian Zoboroski	Jodi Weatherton	2005 Subaru Impreza WRX
14	Viewers' Revenge	2007	Abram Boise^	Kina Dean	Shane Landrum*	Adam Larson	Susie Meister	Veronica Portillo*	Mazda3 and Cumulative Cash Prize
14	Viewers' Revenge	2007	Dan Walsh*	Kina Dean	David Leech^	Adam Larson	Angel Turlington*	Tori Hall	Mazda3 and Cumulative Cash Prize
14	Viewers' Revenge	2007	Derek McCray	Kina Dean	Dan Walsh*	Adam Larson	Susie Meister	Tori Hall	Mazda3 and Cumulative Cash Prize
14	Viewers' Revenge	2007	Derek McCray	Kina Dean	LaMonte Ponder	Adam Larson	Susie Meister	Tori Hall	Mazda3 and Cumulative Cash Prize

== Show's evolution ==
The series began with a simple format, closely mirroring its parent show The Real World. The concept was simple, abandon five strangers on the road, take away their money, have them drive around in an RV completing missions and doing odd jobs for money, and if they lasted to the end of the trip, they would win a "handsome reward". It was touted as The Real World on an RV, but as the show progressed, several changes were made to the show for various reasons, mostly having to do with causing excitement and raising sagging ratings.

=== Europe (Season 3) ===
In its third season, producers of the show took production to the next level by deciding to move the show from the United States to Europe. While the first two seasons were not themed according to the series' location, the third season introduced the subtitle into the concept which would usually strand the Roadies in different locations around the world.

=== Islands (Season 4) ===
For the first time, the RV was completely abandoned for a short time in favor of an alternate mode of transportation. The cast traveled in and around the Caribbean islands and for a short time traveled on a catamaran. This season also competed against the Boston season of The Real World in San Juan, Puerto Rico, planting the seeds for the Real World/Road Rules Challenge and future face-offs.

=== Northern Trail (Season 5) ===
Changing the dynamic of the cast in hopes of creating more drama by including more people in the RV, an additional cast member was included, changing the number of cast members from five to six.

=== Semester at Sea (Season 8) ===
Enticed by the idea of sailing around the world, producers put the cast on the University of Pittsburgh's Semester at Sea educational program. For the first time in any season, in order for the cast to get their handsome reward, the cast needed to complete coursework aboard the ship. Prior to this, cast members only needed to get to the end of the trip, and would not be penalized for refusing to do a mission.

=== Maximum Velocity Tour (Season 9) ===
Due to an exaggerated trend of sagging ratings, some say due to the Semester at Sea season, the show underwent a major re-tooling. The Maximum Velocity Tour represents when the series transitioned from a documentary-style reality show to an entertainment reality show. The show was brought back to the US and given a "game show" format. At the helm of a trip was a fictional character named the "Road Master" completed. After the cast would complete a mission, they would have points added to the group pool for the end prize and if they failed to complete a mission, they would lose the money.

=== The Quest (Season 10) ===
Producers continued to re-tool the show. This time, if the cast members lost two missions, they would have to vote out a cast member. Any additional mission lost after that, another cast member would be voted off. Also, instead of adding money to a group pool, the cast competed each mission for a "key" to the handsome reward. The "keys" were placed in the RV on a large board where each "key" represented a virtue the cast learned in that mission. For this season, the "key" would be represented as part of a crest. If the cast lost a mission, they would not receive the "key" until they voted off a cast member. Jisela Delgado was the first cast member to be voted off in the series. Katie Doyle was the first replacement in the series. The series remained largely unchanged after this season, although each subsequent series had its own variation on the rules of the game.

=== Viewers' Revenge (Season 14) ===
After the series' 13th season, MTV decided not to renew the series, giving the official status of "on hiatus" for four years before being officially cancelled. In March 2005, Bunim-Murray Productions pitched the idea of an interactive format to the show in which viewers at home would be a part of the series, and running the series in real time in order for the viewers at home to have a say in the competition; nothing came of this concept.

== Road Rules face-offs ==
Setting up the idea for The Real World/Road Rules Challenge, the face-offs have come to be an instrumental part of each season. The current cast competes either with a current The Real World cast who would be filming their series parallel to theirs or a former Road Rules cast, if Real World was ever out of its production season. The first official face-off, between the Islands and Boston casts gained such high ratings, that a spin-off series was begun, the ever-popular Challenges, and a pattern in most seasons where the cast would compete against another cast for a separate prize.

- First Adventure - No face-off during this season. Although cast member Mark initially appeared on the Real World: San Francisco season as one of three possible replacements for ousted housemate, Puck. The housemates chose Jo over Mark.
- Second Adventure vs. Real World: Miami - The Road Rules cast posed as house cleaners and stole the Miami's cast eight-ball. They did so successfully. Timmy fooled Miami's Dan and Cynthia who were obviously suspicious of the unannounced cleaning crew.
- Europe - No face-off.
- Islands vs. Real World: Boston - The casts competed in a series of competitions in San Juan, Puerto Rico. Prior to each event, two random people from the Boston cast were required to sit out in order for the number of people on each team to be even. The first event was to get each teammate through a web of wires. Each teammate had to pass through a different hole and could not touch the sides. The second event was to get each teammate from one platform to another using only a piece of wood that was not long enough to bridge the gap. The third event was to have all 5 teammates balance on a wooden cube at the same time. The fourth event was to have each teammate climb a wooden wall, and the final event was a tug of war. The Real World Boston won the first three events, and the Road Rules Islands cast won the final two. Syrus, while competing in the second mission, injured his shin attempting to jump from one platform to the other without using the board. The Islands crew, who desperately needed money at that time asked the Boston cast to split their winnings. The Boston cast declined to do so. They also played paintball with a team of former Road Rulers from different seasons at the beginning of their season. (Los/Christian/Devin/Effie/Michelle with special guest Timmy as a referee) The previous Road Rulers won two of the three contests, leaving the Road Rules Islands cast with only $400.
- Northern Trail vs. Road Rules: All Stars - The casts competed in a series of Olympic-themed games including luge, ski jumping, and figure skating. The Olympic-theme was due in part to the fact that the casts were competing in the Olympic facilities at Lake Placid, New York. The competition consisted of 5 events: a two-man kayak, a one-man kayak, two individual luges, ski jumping, and figure skating. Each person had to compete in at least one event but could not compete in more than two. Road Rules won the two man kayak and the luge while the Real World All-Stars won the individual kayak and the ski jumping events. At the figure skating competition, Noah and Dan edged out Sean and Cynthia to give Northern Trail the victory. The Northern Trail handed the keys off to their RV, which the All-Stars cast used for their season.
- Down Under vs. Real World: Seattle - The cast competed in the "Aqua Games" in Seattle's main harbor. They competed in various games, including holding onto the back of a raft attached to a seadoo, jumping into rings from a platform, and the finale: a bull-riding contest. Nathan won the competition for the Seattle cast, while Christina and Susie both took the competition as a joke.
- Latin America vs. Road Rules: Down Under - The cast competed in Veracruz, Mexico in a series of games. The Down Under cast took the prize, but the more serious implication of this face-off was when Abe of the Latin America cast hooked up with Susie in the RV. This started the tension between Abe and Gladys, which led to Gladys hitting Abe and being sent home.
- Semester at Sea - Did not do a face-off. Various students on the Semester at Sea program participated in various missions during this season.
- Maximum Velocity Tour vs. Real World: New Orleans - In a throwback to the first face-off, the Maximum Velocity Tour cast worked with a Make-A-Wish child to pull off a sting on the Real World: New Orleans cast. They included the Make-A-Wish child in the mission, as the cast posed as Make-A-Wish ambassadors to distract the cast members while James and Laterrian jumped a back wall to steal the New Orleans' cast robotic dog. Hearing that the cast was in town, Melissa of the New Orleans cast hid the eight-ball in anticipation of the cast stealing it. This cast also competed in Los Angeles, CA against the cast of the first season of Making the Band (O-Town) in which O-Town won. They also competed against a group of winners from an MTV.com contest in Provo, Utah, which Road Rules won, and competed against the Playboy Extreme Team.
- The Quest vs. Real World: Back to New York - The casts met up in Morocco. These two casts met up after spending a week in Palm Spring during casting. Members of each cast had already made friends and enemies, creating instant drama and the casts playing practical jokes on each other. In direct contrast to her competitive persona on the Challenges, Back to New York's Coral and fellow cast member Nicole refused to compete in a mud wrestling challenge. This left Back to New York's Lori and Rachel to compete alone against the Road Rules girls. In a grueling mud wrestling competition, Road Rules won because Coral and Nicole refused to compete.
- Campus Crawl vs. Real World: Las Vegas - The Campus Crawl cast first had to take a photograph with one of the Las Vegas cast members handcuffed to the bathtub. Because Raquel had met Steven of Las Vegas in the College Station casting call, Raquel was able to coax Steven to show her and Rachel the Las Vegas suite. Not knowing that the two were from Road Rules, they were able to handcuff and photograph Steven. The cast competed at Lake Red Rock near Las Vegas, Nevada which The Real World won.
- South Pacific vs. Road Rules Campus Crawl - This cast competed in a marathon challenge, in which the cast was required to compete in different games but were not allowed to sleep during the 48-hour period. In the last competition, in which they had to remember various details in the past 48 hours, the Campus Crawl cast pulled off a win.
- X-Treme vs. Road Rules: South Pacific - The two casts competed in a series of games which concludes with a boxing match. The X-Treme cast beat the South Pacific cast.
- Viewers' Revenge vs. Pit Crew. Roadies beat out the Pit Crew in a mission that had players carrying tires from sand dunes. They also beat the Pit Crew in a mission that involved weight lifting and weight puzzles, along with a football game. The final challenge was carrying boxes across semis and dropping them into the hole; Pit Crew finally won, making the score 3-1.
