= Real World/Road Rules Challenge: The Ruins =

18th season of the reality television series

Coordinates: 8.167109°N 98.338903°E

The Ruins
- Season 18
- Presented by: T. J. Lavin
- No. of contestants: 28
- Winners: Derrick Kosinski; Evan Starkman; Johnny Devenanzio; Kenny Santucci; Susie Meister
- Location: Phuket, Thailand
- No. of episodes: 12 (Special & Reunion Included)

Release
- Original network: MTV
- Original release: September 30 – December 23, 2009

Season chronology
- ← Previous; The Duel II Next → Fresh Meat II

Real World Road Rules Challenge: The Ruins is the 18th season of the MTV reality television game show, The Challenge (at the time known as Real World/Road Rules Challenge). This is the last season to use Real World/Road Rules in the on-screen title, before being shortened to The Challenge in the 19th season.

The Ruins took place in Phuket, Thailand, with cast members from The Real World, Road Rules and The Challenge competing. This season featured two teams: Champions and Challengers. Contestants on the Champions team had won at least on one previous season, while players on the Challengers team had never won a final or were new to the series.

The season premiered on September 30, 2009 and concluded with the "S#!t They Should Have Shown" special on December 23, 2009.

== Format ==
This season of the Real World/Road Rules Challenge puts the Champions against the Challengers. The two teams compete in numerous missions, typically called challenges, in order to win cash, prizes and advance in the overall game. The winning team in each challenge receives a cash prize of $20,000, which is split evenly among the team members and placed in their individual bank accounts, as well as a bonus prize for each member of the team.

Before every challenge however, the Champions and the Challengers each select three players of each gender within their team to be nominated for elimination. After the challenge, the six nominees from the winning team pick one guy and one girl among themselves, as well as a male-female pair from the losing team's nominees to battle against in the Ruins.

In the Ruins, there are two events — one battle for each gender. The winners from each event get to stay in Phuket, and have a chance to compete for a share of $120,000 in the final challenge. The losers are eliminated from the game, and lose all of their prize money in their individual bank accounts to the event winners, though their bonus prizes are not affected.

== Contestants ==
Champions	Original season	Finish
Derrick Kosinski (Note: The Inferno 3) (Note: The Island)	Road Rules: X-Treme	Winner
Evan Starkman (Note: The Duel II)	Real World/Road Rules Challenge: Fresh Meat	Winner
Johnny Devenanzio	The Real World: Key West	Winner
Kenny Santucci	Real World/Road Rules Challenge: Fresh Meat	Winner
Susie Meister (Note: The Gauntlet 2)	Road Rules: Down Under	Winner
Darrell Taylor (Note: The Gauntlet) (Note: The Inferno) (Note: The Inferno II) (Note: Fresh Meat)	Road Rules: Campus Crawl	Episode 8 (Note: Prior to the "On The Fence" challenge in Episode 8, Brad and Darrell were disqualified from the competition after Brad instigated Darrell into punching him multiple times. Brad ended up suffering a swollen eye and the money they earned was added to the final challenge total.)
Johanna Botta (Note: The Gauntlet III)	The Real World: Austin	Episode 7
Veronica Portillo (Note: Challenge 2000)	Road Rules: Semester at Sea	Episode 6
Syrus Yarbrough (Note: Extreme Challenge)	The Real World: Boston	Episode 6
Ibis Nieves	Road Rules: X-Treme	Episode 5
Wes Bergmann (Note: The Duel)	The Real World: Austin	Episode 5
Katie Doyle	Road Rules: The Quest	Episode 4
Tonya Cooley	The Real World: Chicago	Episode 4 (Note: Tonya was disqualified from the competition in Episode 4, after she slapped Veronica multiple times during a heated argument. The money that Tonya earned was added to the final challenge total.)
Evelyn Smith	Real World/Road Rules Challenge: Fresh Meat	Episode 2

Challengers	Original season	Finish
KellyAnne Judd	The Real World: Sydney	Runner-up
Sarah Rice	The Real World: Brooklyn	Runner-up
Casey Cooper	Real World/Road Rules Challenge: Fresh Meat	Episode 9
Dunbar Merrill	The Real World: Sydney	Episode 9
Kimberly Alexander	The Real World: Hollywood	Episode 9
Brad Fiorenza	The Real World: San Diego	Episode 8
Cohutta Grindstaff	The Real World: Sydney	Episode 7
Danny Jamieson	The Real World: Austin	Episode 4
Adam King	The Real World: Paris	Episode 3
Brianna Taylor	The Real World: Hollywood	Episode 3
Nick Brown	The Real World: Hollywood	Episode 2
Shauvon Torres	The Real World: Sydney	Episode 2 (Note: Shauvon withdrew from the game in Episode 2 after sustaining a severe chest injury during the "Swing On By" challenge. She did not earn any money prior to her departure.)
Diem Brown	Real World/Road Rules Challenge: Fresh Meat	Episode 1
Chet Cannon	The Real World: Brooklyn	Episode 1

Champion of

== Gameplay ==
=== Challenge games ===
- Chain Gang: Each team is connected to a 30-foot rope that is hanging from a platform suspended high above water. The bottom person has to unclip himself/herself and climb to the top. Once that person climbs up and rings the gong, the next person at the bottom can unhook themself and climb up. If someone unhooks before it is their turn, everyone under them is disqualified along with anybody who falls. The team that sends the most players to the top of the platform wins, unless there is a tie, in which the team with the fastest time wins.
  - Winners: Champions
- Swing on By: Players from each team have to swing by a rope from one platform to another in a 180° circle. A fence is located in between both platforms that is suspended high above water. One by one, each player has to swing from a launch pad, around the fence, and onto the landing platform. Once a player lands on the landing pad, that player must remain on the pad, and if that player falls into the water, he/she must return to the launch pad and swing again. The team with the fastest time wins. (Note: The Champions team had to sit out two players.)
  - Winners: Champions
- Repo Race: Each team must advance from one end of an obstacle course to another. However, they must do so by forming a human bridge resulting in lying face down in the sand, with their backs as the planks. The last person at the back of the "bridge" must advance to and reposition to the front of the bridge, but if a runner steps in the sand or falls off the "bridge," the entire team must reset to their previous position. At the last obstacle, the designated runner from each team must carry a bag through their respective "bridges" to the finish line, without dropping it in the sand. The team that advances to the end of the obstacle course first wins.
  - Winners: Challengers
- Burning Bridge: A raft is located in the middle of a lake, and each team has to build a floating bridge from the raft to the shore. Players from each team have to swim toward the raft, then release bridge pieces that are attached to anchors below water. Once the bridge is complete, one player from each team must run across it with a torch in their hand, then light the raft on fire. The first team to light their team raft on fire wins.
  - Winners: Champions
- Block Party: Two guys and two girls from each team will wrap around a pole. The remaining players from each team will then need to pull the other team's players off the pole and drag them back to the starting area to eliminate them. When a player is eliminated, they can join their teammates in trying to pull the opposing team's players from the pole. Once the opposing team's four players wrapped around the pole are eliminated, the team can then begin carrying cinder blocks to the pole to build steps high enough to ring the gong. The first team to ring a gong wins.
  - Winners: Champions
- Fruits of Your Labor: Teams have to transfer Thai fruit from one end of an obstacle course to another. The challenge begins with players loading up as much fruit into a basket as possible, then running toward a wall and tossing all the fruit over the wall, where two teammates will try to catch the fruit into a sack, then those players will transfer baskets of fruit to a table, where the next set of teammates will deliver the fruit from the table to a weight scale, using bamboo poles but not their hands. The team that transfers as much fruit into the weight scale wins.
  - Winners: Champions
- Rotary Club: Players from each team roll down an obstacle course while curled up inside of a giant tractor tire. If a tire stops short of the finish line with a player inside of it, one player designated as a tracker must push that tire across the finish line, and once that player has crossed the finish line, he/she has to push the tire uphill to a white line near the end zone, where teammates can help push the tire back to the beginning of the course. The process continues until each player has ridden inside of the tire down to the end zone and advanced the tire back to the beginning of the course, where the team that completes the challenge first wins.
  - Winners: Champions
- On the Fence: Players from each team have to maneuver across a series of three chain-link fences that are suspended from a structure above a 20-story building and ring a gong at the end of the last chain-link fence. One player per team races against an opposing player on opposite sides, and if a player falls, a 15-minute penalty will be added to their team's overall score. The team that advances each player to the end to ring a gong in the fastest time wins.
  - Winners: Champions
- Wall Walker: Players from each team have to run up a circular ramp that is attached to a platform suspended atop a 20-story building, and collect up to three flowers that are inside three vases atop the ramp. Each player has to collect as much flowers as possible, and transfer them to a vase at the other side of the runway. (Note: Since the Challengers team had two fewer players than the Champions, two players from the Challengers team had to go up the ramp twice.) The team that transfers the most flowers into the vase on the opposite side of the runway wins.
  - Winners: Champions

=== Ruins games ===
- Shoots and Ladders: Players build a ladder with bamboo poles in front of them. Once their ladder is 100% percent, they race to the top and hit their gong. The first person to do so wins.
  - Played by: Chet vs. Wes and Diem vs. Tonya
- Shadow Fighter: Standing in two separate platforms and tied together by a series of ropes by the feet and hands, the challengers must use the ropes to make the opponent fall off the platform. The first to three points wins.
  - Played by: Nick vs. Wes and KellyAnne vs. Evelyn
- Burnout: Players extinguish a fire by steering water from a center pipe, with a wheel, into the opponent's barrel. Once the barrel becomes full, it spills into a gutter, leading to a pot filled with burning cigars. The first person to extinguish their opponent's fire wins.
  - Played by: Adam vs. Syrus and Brianna vs. Susie
- Oh Ring: A player from each team tries to wrestle a ring away from their opponent, while suspended above the ground from their feet. The first player to wrestle the ring away from their opponent twice wins.
  - Played by: Danny vs. Darrell and Sarah vs. Katie
- Spool: Players weave a rope through an obstacle course, under and over bamboo poles. The first player to weave their rope through the obstacle course and ring their gong wins.
  - Played by: Cohutta vs. Wes and Kimberly vs. Ibis
- Hog Tie: While suspended from carabiners by their wrists and feet under a large bamboo pole, players try to shimmy their way from one end of the pole to the other, grab a key halfway through, then unlock the carabiners with the key, while laying on a platform. Once a player has unlocked the carabiners, he/she can return to the ground, then race back to the beginning side of the pole to ring a gong.
  - Played by: Cohutta vs. Syrus and KellyAnne vs. Veronica
- Crunch: Players are hanging upside down in a crunch position by their legs from bamboo poles, with their heads partially submerged in separate water tanks. The players try to maintain 40-lb. weights on their chests by using their ab muscles, while trying to keep their heads above water. The opponent wins if a player surrenders by pulling an emergency lever inside the tank, which releases all the water.
  - Played by: Cohutta vs. Darrell and Johanna vs. Sarah
- Rag Doll: Within a circle, the player who wrestles a rope away from their opponent wins.
  - Played by: Dunbar vs. Johnny and Kimberly vs. Susie
- Muay Thai: Players "karate-kick" the bottoms of bamboo poles that are hanging in a vertical row of an obstacle course. The first player to kick and break every bamboo pole and ring their gong wins.
  - Played by: Casey vs. Susie (Note: No male Ruins was held at the end of Episode 9, after all the men from the Challengers team had already been eliminated.)

=== Final challenge ===
Each team begins by racing to the first checkpoint, "Bizarre Buffet," where each player must completely eat a series of five bizarre foods—beetles, fried frog legs, stinky Thai fruit, red chilies and crickets & grasshoppers—in order to collect a Thai artifact and advance to the second checkpoint. At "Junction," teams are faced with choosing one of four different colored paths, collecting an artifact at the end of each path and placing each artifact into their team stone that will open a secret door. The other checkpoints consist of a jigsaw puzzle, crawling through a mud pit and back, walk through an "Shortcut" obstacle course with bamboo poles and solving a difficult Building Blocks puzzle. If any player falls of the bamboo poles while trying to complete the Shortcut course, the entire team must restart the Shortcut course. If a team does not complete the Building Blocks puzzle within a 30-minute time limit, each player must carry a block with them to the Junction. The team that makes it to the finish line first after opening the secret door with all five artifacts wins an additional $160,000 to be split amongst their team members.

- Winners: Champions

== Game summary ==
Episode		Winners	Ruins contestants						Ruins game	Ruins outcome	
#	Challenge	Winners	Champions			Challengers			Ruins game	Winner	Eliminated
1	Chain Gang	Champions	Darrell	Kenny	Wes	Chet	Cohutta	Nick	Shoots and Ladders	Wes	Chet
1	Chain Gang	Champions	Johanna	Susie	Tonya	Diem	Sarah	Shauvon	Shoots and Ladders	Tonya	Diem
2	Swing on By	Champions	Derrick	Johnny	Wes	Cohutta	Danny	Nick	Shadow Fighter	Wes	Nick
2	Swing on By	Champions	Evelyn	Katie	Susie	Casey	KellyAnne	~~Shauvon~~	Shadow Fighter	KellyAnne	Evelyn
3	Repo Race	Challengers	Ibis	Susie	Veronica	Brianna	Casey	Kimberly	Burnout	Susie	Brianna
3	Repo Race	Challengers	Evan	Kenny	Syrus	Adam	Brad	Danny	Burnout	Syrus	Adam
4	Burning Bridge	Champions	Katie	Susie	~~Tonya~~	Casey	Kimberly	Sarah	Oh Ring	Sarah	Katie
4	Burning Bridge	Champions	Darrell	Derrick	Johnny	Cohutta	Danny	Dunbar	Oh Ring	Darrell	Danny
5	Block Party	Champions	Evan	Kenny	Wes	Brad	Cohutta	Dunbar	Spool	Cohutta	Wes
5	Block Party	Champions	Ibis	Johanna	Veronica	Casey	KellyAnne	Kimberly	Spool	Kimberly	Ibis
6	Fruits of Your Labor	Champions	Derrick	Johnny	Syrus	Brad	Cohutta	Dunbar	Hog Tie	Cohutta	Syrus
6	Fruits of Your Labor	Champions	Johanna	Susie	Veronica	Casey	KellyAnne	Sarah	Hog Tie	KellyAnne	Veronica
7	Rotary Club	Champions	Johanna	Susie	—N/a	Casey	Kimberly	Sarah	Crunch	Sarah	Johanna
7	Rotary Club	Champions	Darrell	Evan	Kenny	Brad	Cohutta	Dunbar	Crunch	Darrell	Cohutta
8/9	On the Fence	Champions	Susie	—N/a		Casey	KellyAnne	Kimberly	Rag Doll	Susie	Kimberly
8/9	On the Fence	Champions	Derrick	Johnny	Kenny	Dunbar	—N/a		Rag Doll	Johnny	Dunbar
9	Wall Walker	Champions	Susie	—N/a		Casey	KellyAnne	Sarah	Muay Thai	Susie	Casey
10	Final Challenge	Champions									

=== Elimination progress ===
Contestants	Challenges									
Contestants	1	2	3	4	5	6	7	8/9	9	Finale
Derrick	SAFE	RISK	SAFE	RISK	SAFE	RISK	SAFE	RISK	SAFE	WINNER
Evan	SAFE	SAFE	RISK	SAFE	RISK	SAFE	RISK	SAFE	SAFE	WINNER
Johnny	SAFE	RISK	SAFE	RISK	SAFE	RISK	SAFE	ELIM	SAFE	WINNER
Kenny	RISK	SAFE	RISK	SAFE	RISK	SAFE	RISK	RISK	SAFE	WINNER
Susie	RISK	RISK	ELIM	RISK	SAFE	RISK	RISK	ELIM	ELIM	WINNER
KellyAnne	SAFE	ELIM	SAFE	SAFE	RISK	ELIM	SAFE	RISK	RISK	LOSER
Sarah	RISK	SAFE	SAFE	ELIM	SAFE	RISK	ELIM	SAFE	RISK	LOSER
Casey	SAFE	RISK	RISK	RISK	RISK	RISK	RISK	RISK	OUT	
Dunbar	SAFE	SAFE	SAFE	RISK	RISK	RISK	RISK	OUT		
Kimberly	SAFE	SAFE	RISK	RISK	ELIM	SAFE	RISK	OUT		
Brad	SAFE	SAFE	RISK	SAFE	RISK	RISK	RISK	DQ		
Darrell	RISK	SAFE	SAFE	ELIM	SAFE	SAFE	ELIM	DQ		
Cohutta	RISK	RISK	SAFE	RISK	ELIM	ELIM	OUT			
Johanna	RISK	SAFE	SAFE	SAFE	RISK	RISK	OUT			
Veronica	SAFE	SAFE	RISK	SAFE	RISK	OUT				
Syrus	SAFE	SAFE	ELIM	SAFE	SAFE	OUT				
Ibis	SAFE	SAFE	RISK	SAFE	OUT					
Wes	ELIM	ELIM	SAFE	SAFE	OUT					
Danny	SAFE	RISK	RISK	OUT						
Katie	SAFE	RISK	SAFE	OUT						
Tonya	ELIM	SAFE	SAFE	DQ						
Adam	SAFE	SAFE	OUT							
Brianna	SAFE	SAFE	OUT							
Evelyn	SAFE	OUT								
Nick	RISK	OUT								
Shauvon	RISK	QUIT								
Diem	OUT									
Chet	OUT									

Teams
The contestant is on the Challengers team
The contestant is on the Champions team

Competition
The contestant's team won the final challenge
The contestant's team lost the final challenge
The contestant was safe from the Ruins
The contestant was nominated for the Ruins, but was not chosen to go in and was safe
The contestant was put into the Ruins and won
The contestant was put into the Ruins and was eliminated
The contestant was disqualified from the competition due to disciplinary reasons
The contestant withdrew from the competition due to medical reasons

=== Bank progress ===
Player	Episodes									
Player	1	2	3	4	5	6	7	8/9	9	10
Derrick	$1,400	$2,800	$2,800	$4,400	$6,220	$8,440	$11,300	$15,300	$19,300	$50,970
Evan	$1,400	$2,800	$2,800	$4,400	$6,220	$8,440	$11,300	$15,300	$19,300	$50,970
Johnny	$1,400	$2,800	$2,800	$4,400	$6,220	$8,440	$11,300	$17,300	$21,300	$52,970
Kenny	$1,400	$2,800	$2,800	$4,400	$6,220	$8,440	$11,300	$15,300	$19,300	$50,970
Susie	$1,400	$2,800	$4,800	$6,400	$8,220	$10,440	$13,300	$25,520	$31,520	$63,190
KellyAnne	$0	$2,800	$4,800	$4,800	$4,800	$13,300	$13,300	$13,300	$13,300	$13,300
Sarah	$0	$0	$2,000	$6,400	$6,400	$6,400	$17,700	$17,700	$17,700	$17,700
Casey	$0	$0	$2,000	$2,000	$2,000	$2,000	$2,000	$2,000	$2,000	
Dunbar	$0	$0	$2,000	$2,000	$2,000	$2,000	$2,000	$2,000		
Kimberly	$0	$0	$2,000	$2,000	$8,220	$8,220	$8,220	$8,220		
Darrell	$1,400	$2,800	$2,800	$6,400	$8,220	$10,440	$31,960	~~$31,960~~		
Brad	$0	$0	$2,000	$2,000	$2,000	$2,000	$2,000	~~$2,000~~		
Cohutta	$0	$0	$2,000	$2,000	$8,220	$18,660	$18,660			
Johanna	$1,400	$2,800	$2,800	$4,400	$6,220	$8,440	$11,300			
Veronica	$1,400	$2,800	$2,800	$4,400	$6,220	$8,440				
Syrus	$1,400	$2,800	$4,800	$6,400	$8,220	$10,440				
Ibis	$1,400	$2,800	$2,800	$4,400	$6,220					
Wes	$1,400	$2,800	$2,800	$4,400	$6,220					
Danny	$0	$0	$2,000	$2,000						
Katie	$1,400	$2,800	$2,800	$4,400						
Tonya	$1,400	$2,800	$2,800	~~$4,400~~						
Brianna	$0	$0	$2,000							
Adam	$0	$0	$2,000							
Evelyn	$1,400	$2,800								
Nick	$0	$0								
Shauvon	$0	$0								
Diem	$0									
Chet	$0									

Final Prize: $158,350

== Episodes ==
No. overall	No. in season	Title	Original release date	US viewers (millions)
231	1	"Wes Side Story"	September 30, 2009	1.699
232	2	"The Booby Trap"	October 7, 2009	N/A
233	3	"The Road to Ruins"	October 14, 2009	N/A
234	4	"Girls Gone Wild"	October 21, 2009	N/A
235	5	"Reversal of Fortune"	October 28, 2009	N/A
236	6	"Ruining On Empty"	November 4, 2009	N/A
237	7	"Silence of the Ruins"	November 11, 2009	N/A
238	8	"Thai Me Up! Thai Me Down!"	November 18, 2009	N/A
239	9	"Muay So-Called Ruins?"	December 2, 2009	N/A
240	10	"Good Thai and Good Luck"	December 9, 2009	N/A

=== Reunion special ===
The reunion aired on December 16, 2009 and it was hosted by Maria Menounos. Cast members that attended were: Wes, KellyAnne, Brad, Sarah, Evan, Dunbar, Kenny, Johanna, Johnny, Veronica, Susie & Katie. First topic was the weather in Thailand, how hot it was and how it affected the competition. Next topic was the final challenge, Sarah and KellyAnne said that until the final puzzle they thought they had a shot at the money, Susie said that she considered making a deal with the Challengers but at the end it's better to win the money yourself than get it from a deal, Evan then added that he had no doubt about Susie's performance in the final challenge because the night before she told him "nothing funny" was going to happen but Johnny said he had doubts. Susie was pointed to be as manipulative as Kenny and Evan.

The Brad/Darrell fight was shown and Brad talked about his trip to the hospital and his recovery process. Brad talked about how Tori reacted to the fight and their upcoming wedding, and he added he probably would not come back for another Challenge without Tori. Footage of Wes' multiple fights with the cast was shown. The love pentagon (Cohutta, KellyAnne, Wes, Johanna & Kenny) was also discussed, Johanna explained her side on the story and why she felt so down during the season. KellyAnne and Evelyn's elimination round was discussed next, Wes said he now understands that putting KellyAnne against Evelyn was the smartest decision for the Champions team and that it was not a personal attack, but KellyAnne said she still doesn't understand why her teammates wanted her out. Sarah then talked about how Kenny, Evan and Johnny made her feel and why she cried after Johnny's comments. Johanna said she exploited with Johnny's comments and not with Kenny's because they both had a "third grade crush" on each other but Sarah explained it was because Kenny and Evan make fun of so many people that it's normal, Wes said that it was time for the "I'm mean to everyone so I can be mean to you" excuse Kenny uses ends, Johanna added she was in Sarah's position with Kenny and Evan a while ago but it eventually gets better. Johnny and Katie talked about the fight with Sarah.

Maria Menounos commented on how this season broke the record of challengers being disqualified and the Veronica/Tonya fight was shown, Veronica said that up until the day of the fight she and Tonya were good on the challenge, that she didn't walk away because she did not think Tonya would hit her. Veronica said Tonya shouldn't have been on the show because she's not stable enough. Some footage of "The S#it They Should Have Shown" is played, as well as a preview for The Real World: D.C.

== Sexual assault controversy ==
In October 2011, two years after The Ruins season aired, contestant Tonya Cooley filed a lawsuit against fellow contestants Kenny Santucci and Evan Starkman, MTV, and Bunim/Murray Productions, claiming that she was sexually assaulted during filming. Cooley claimed in the lawsuit that Santucci and Starkman inserted a toothbrush into her vaginal canal while she was passed out from heavy drinking, and stated that she was subjected to an environment in which degrading and harassing behavior was directed at female contestants, including bathing suits stripped off their bodies. The lawsuit was settled out of court one year later.
