= Can't Stay Here =

Can't Stay Here may refer to:

- Can't Stay Here, a 2026 album by Nate Haller
- "Can't Stay Here", a song by Jenn Grinels
- "Can't Stay Here", a song by MGK from Lost Americana, 2025
- "Can't Stay Here", a song by Tucker Beathard from King, 2020

== See also ==
- You Can't Stay Here, an album by Iron Chic, 2017
- "You Can't Stay Here", a song by Stan Rogers from Northwest Passage, 1981
