= Jenn Grinels =

American singer-songwriter

- Origin: Cupertino, California, U.S.
- Genres: Indie rock Acoustic rock Folk rock
- Years active: 2003–present
- Label: Unsigned
- Website: Official website

Jenn Grinels is an American musician, singer and songwriter, musical theatre composer, and actress. Originally from Northern California, Grinels is an indie artist who has grown a large grassroots fanbase through social media and a decade of constant touring.

== History ==
Jenn Grinels is nationally touring singer/songwriter, recording artist and composer. The New York based musician has spent over a decade performing nearly 1500 concerts in venues ranging from Villa Montalvo to Lincoln Center, performing arts centers to listening rooms, living rooms and universities. She has shared the stage with artists including the 10,000 Maniacs, Christopher Cross, Marc Broussard, Edwin McCain, and Marc Cohn.

Raised in Cupertino, CA, Jenn’s path to music started in school and church choirs, local musical theater productions, and a garage rock band that consisted of jazz students from Monta Vista, Fremont, and Homestead High school. Grinels studied musical theater at UC Irvine and worked steadily in professional theaters around Southern California until 2007. That year, she completed her first studio album and made the decision to give up her apartment, put her belongings in storage and set out as a traveling troubadour.

Her song "Can't Stay Here" was featured on MTV's Real World/Road Rules Challenge: The Island.

Grinels is also one half of the folk/Americana duo Siren Songs, with whom she released the 2020 self-titled album "Siren Songs." Grinels' 2020 studio album, "Go Mine," features elements of soul, jazz, folk, blues, pop, Americana, and rock. In February 2021, Grinels released her third album in a year: "Live Volume 1," recorded over three nights at three different venues in Maryland and Ohio.

== Musical style ==
Grinels' music is characterized by acoustic guitar and powerful vocals. Her vocal delivery has elements of folk, pop rock, jazz, and blues.

== Theatrical ==
Jenn Grinels began her career in musical theater, performing in professional productions in Southern California after studying theater at UC Irvine. Grinels played Yitzhak in the West Coast Premiere of Hedwig and the Angry Inch and spent nearly three years portraying Janis Joplin in Beehive. With her original folk rock/Americana musical "Wakeman", Grinels returned to her musical theater roots, combining her experience on theatrical stages and as a singer/songwriter. In 2024 she was a finalist for the Kleban Prize in Lyrics, and an Artist in Residence at Circle in the Square Theater School in NYC. "Wakeman" was a Village Theatre Festival of New Works selection in 2024, as well as a NAMT Finalist in 2022 and 2023. In 2025, "Wakeman" was featured in NAMT's Festival of New Musicals in NYC, featuring performances by Beth Malone, Ari Notartomaso and Abe Goldfarb. Since Wakeman, Grinels has composed the original musical "The Handless Maiden," produced by NYU Steinhardt.

== Awards ==
- 2007 Honoring Acoustic Talent Award - Best Performer
- 2007 Honoring Acoustic Talent Award - Best Vocalist
- West Coast Songwriters' Song Contest, Song of the Year: "Can't Stay Here" (little words)-
- 2010 APCA Best Female Solo Artist
- 2011 APCA Best Female Solo Artist
- 2012 APCA Best Female Solo Artist
- 2012 Best Music Act - Campus Activities Magazine

== Discography ==
ALBUMS:

- little words, 2007
- brokenHEARTbreaker, 2012
- Live at the Rutledge, 2015
- Go Mine, 2020
- Live Volume 1, 2021
- Western Heart, (upcoming) 2026

SINGLES:

- Easy This Year, 2020
- Take, 2020
- Trust, 2021
- Always On The Run, 2026

WITH SIREN SONGS:

- Siren Songs, 2020 (album)
- River, 2020 (single)
- Close My Eyes To See, 2020 (single)
- Lullaby For Atlas, 2021 (single)
- Tennessee Waltz, 2021 (single)
- Goodnight My Dear, 2021 (single)
- Letter To Your Heart, 2021 (single)
- What A Wonderful World, 2023 (single)
- Spring, 2023 (single
- Summer Song, 2023 (single)
- April, 2025 (single)

== As a Sideman ==
"KILR", 2011
