= Danny Dias =

American activist

Danny Dias (c. 1983 – June 4, 2017) was an American activist and reality television personality. Dias starred on season 13 of MTV's Road Rules, in 2004. In 2005, he competed on season 11 of Real World/Road Rules Challenge. He later co-founded an AIDS research charity.

== Early life and career ==
Dias was born and raised in Linden, New Jersey, where he attended Linden High School. He majored in music education at Westminster Choir College, a music conservatory affiliated with Rider University in Princeton, which he attended from 2001 to 2003, and then continued his undergraduate education at Seton Hall University. Dias, who was openly gay, was cast in season 13 of MTV's Road Rules while he was still attending college. Road Rules: X-Treme, which was filmed in an RV in Argentina and Chile, aired in 2004. The season cast included Dias, as well as Derrick Kosinski, Jodi Weatherton, Ibis Nieves, Kina Dean, and Patrick Maloney. However, Dias was voted out in Episode 6 as a punishment for losing a mission and was replaced by Nick Haggart.

Dias returned to MTV for Real World/Road Rules Challenge: The Gauntlet 2, his Challenge debut, which aired from 2005 to 2006. He was eliminated from the competition by Alton Williams from The Real World Las Vegas after four episodes.

Following his time on Road Rules, Dias studied acting and worked in finance. He also become an AIDS activist and co-founded the research charity, Generation Cure.

== Death ==
Dias was found unconscious at his Flushing Avenue apartment in Bushwick, Brooklyn, on June 4, 2017, at the age of 34. Friends had reportedly not reached him for two days. He was pronounced dead by authorities at approximately 5 p.m., though a cause of death was initially unknown.
