= The Real World: Sydney =

Coordinates: 33°52′23″S 151°11′58″E

- Season 19
- The original cast of The Real World: Sydney
- Starring: KellyAnne Judd; Cohutta Lee Grindstaff; Trisha Cummings; Shauvon Torres; Parisa Montazaran; Isaac Stout; Dunbar Flinn Merrill; Ashli Robson
- No. of episodes: 24

Release
- Original network: MTV
- Original release: August 8, 2007 – January 9, 2008

Season chronology
- ← Previous; The Real World: Denver Next → The Real World: Hollywood

The Real World: Sydney is the nineteenth season of MTV's reality television series The Real World, which focuses on a group of diverse strangers living together for several months in a different city each season, as cameras follow their lives and interpersonal relationships. It is the only season to be filmed in Australia.

The season featured a total of eight cast members over the course of the season, as one cast member was replaced after she voluntarily left the show. It is the third of four seasons of The Real World to be filmed entirely outside of the United States after The Real World: London in 1995, The Real World: Paris in 2003, and before The Real World: Cancun in 2009.

Production lasted from February to May 26, 2007 and premiered on August 8 of that year, consisting of 24 episodes. A sneak peek of the first episode was first available on MTV On Demand on July 31, and a launch special aired on the network on August 1.

== Assignment ==
Most seasons of The Real World, beginning with the fifth season, have included the assignment of a season-long group job or task to the housemates, continued participation in which has been mandatory to remain part of the cast since the Back to New York season. The Sydney cast was assigned to work for Contiki Tours, a vacation travel package planning company, creating a Sydney tour package.

== The residence ==
The cast was housed in the contemporary 20,000-square-foot (1,900 m^{2}), three-story former OneSport World Building at 19 Darling Walk at the southern end of Darling Harbour, a large recreational and pedestrian district on the western edge of the Sydney central business district. OneSport Darling Harbour was a sports-themed venue for hosting a variety of different events, and could accommodate up to 1,100 people. It closed at some point prior to June 2006, when it was leased to the Real World production, which held the lease until June 2007. The building and the rest of the Darling Walk Complex were demolished in late 2008, to be replaced by a $500 million development that included the Commonwealth Bank's global headquarters buildings, retail space, and a new park.

== Cast ==
Cast members were first photographed and identified by the media while participating in a Contiki tour at the Tjapukai Aboriginal Cultural Park in Cairns, Queensland.

On August 1, 2007, the New York Daily News reported that according to MTV, Persian-American cast member Parisa Montazaran is the show's first Muslim. However, Tami Roman of the 1993 Los Angeles season is a Muslim, as is Mohammed Bilal of the 1994 San Francisco season.

Cast member	Age^{1}	Hometown
Cohutta Lee Grindstaff	23	Blue Ridge, Georgia
The son of a welder, Cohutta is a self-employed contractor who builds log homes for a living. Cohutta's name, which is Cherokee for "mountains that hold up the sky", is derived from the Cohutta Mountain Range in Georgia. He attended Dalton State College and North Georgia Technical College, and is close to his family, which includes his parents, as well as his younger sister and grandfather. He enjoys mountain hiking, horseback riding, and playing the guitar, and is looking for someone with whom he can start a family. He took part in The Real World partially due to pressure from friends, and as part of his goal to see as much as possible before settling down with a wife and children. He has done very little traveling away from home, and characterizes his home town and family as being "slower", because they take the time to sit down to eat together and enjoy the moment. Consequently, he feels out of place whenever he visits a city. He eventually begins a relationship with KellyAnne. Cohutta subsequently appeared on the Challenge.
Dunbar Merrill Flinn	22	Natchez, Mississippi
Dunbar's family lost everything after a money-laundering scandal, and Dunbar was forced to negotiate his own financial situation, and take responsibility for his life. He has two brothers, aged 27 and 19. He enrolled in the military in order to pay for his education at the University of Mississippi, where he belonged to a fraternity. He is committed to his girlfriend Julie back home. MTV.com describes him as "well-spoken, opinionated on political issues, literature and poetry, arrogant, and hot-headed." In the premiere, he claims to be more proud of being Southern than of being an American. In Act 2 of Episode 7, he says that his father used to beat him and his older brother, and that he had himself emancipated at age 15. In Episode 8, he reveals that his grandfather tried several times to molest him when he was a child. While attending private school at age 16–17, he was forced to take anger management classes in order to stay at the school. At one point he cheats on Julie with the cast member who replaced Shauvon, Ashli. After the series, he graduated from college and became a real estate broker.
Isaac Stout	21	Cleveland, Ohio
Isaac is from Cleveland, Ohio and a business major at the University of Arizona. As he explains in the season premiere, he has a history of juvenile delinquency, having been put on probation for robbing 15 houses and shooting off fireworks through someone's window. Given the choice between nine months in jail and a "treatment center", he chose the latter, in order to reevaluate his direction in life. In addition to being an artist and musician, he is also an entertainer, taking place in freestyle dancing battles, doing stand-up comedy, and MCing events. He is Jewish. In Episode 16, he reveals that he used to take a lot of LSD, from which he still suffers from occasional hallucinations of birds, and that when he sees a black bird, he interprets it as a premonition that someone close to him has died. He claims such a premonition in the same episode, before learning of his grandfather's death. Despite his fear of commitment, he enters into a relationship with an Irish woman named Noirin during the season.
KellyAnne Judd	20	Georgetown, Texas
KellyAnne stayed out of most of the drama on Real World Sydney but claims that if she feels someone is walking all over her she will fight back fiercely. A self-described tease, for her audition video, she stripped down to a T-shirt and panties, on the back of which she had written, "Make it Hott: Pick Me!" she comes off as a very confident girl. She is of mixed heritage that includes Italian, Polish and Irish. She was diagnosed with ADD at a young age, and as a result of being prescribed natural medicine, is considering a career in that field. She has a sister named Kalan. Her father works for the state. She blames him for her parents' divorce, on account of the extramarital affair he had for a year, and the resulting pregnancy. She ended her three-year relationship with her ex-boyfriend Sutton before coming to Sydney, and she initially is flirtatious with Dunbar, but eventually enters into a relationship with Cohutta.
Parisa Montazaran	21	Commack, New York
The daughter of Iranian immigrants, Parisa is a Muslim that grew up in Commack, Long Island. She is a graduate of New York University with a degree in International Relation Studies. Montazaran told the New York Daily News that the experience of living with cameras was an "exaggerated existence", which amounted to "partying seven days a week", but that she did nothing during her stay that would embarrass her or her family, though she did call home one night when she drank too much. An aspiring singer, Parisa says in the premiere that she recently graduated from college early in order to concentrate on her music. She repeatedly comes into conflict with Trisha and Dunbar.
Shauvon Torres	24	Sacramento, California
Shauvon is a 24-year-old journalism major at the California State University, Sacramento, and as she says in the premiere, wants to be a news reporter. She has her own dating and relationships column called "Sexcapades". She insists that she is not the blonde bimbo that people may think she looks like. She recently ended her engagement to her fiancé, David, who told her to choose between a career and marriage and children. She is openly bisexual. She later reconciles with him, and moves out in Episode 14 in order to return home.
Trisha Cummings	19	Fresno, California
In the premiere, Trisha says that she and her friends are the stereotypical "hot preppy girl" clique. She was raised as a devout Christian by her adoptive parents. Her parents gave her a promise ring when she was twelve, as a symbol that she would retain her virginity until marriage, but as her boyfriend Jarod states in her home video, they have not upheld that resolution. From early in the season, and repeatedly during it, she comes into conflict with Parisa. In Episode 18, she is sent home for shoving Parisa to the floor during a heated argument.
Ashli Robson	19	Huntington Beach, California
Ashli is a 19-year-old from Huntington Beach, California who moves into the house in Episode 15 as a replacement for Shauvon. She explains when moving in that she is currently single, but "ready to mingle". When she moves in, it is apparent to her, Trisha and Parisa that she and Trisha are very much alike and have similar interests. She is attracted to Dunbar even though he has a girlfriend back home and at one point the two decide to step over the boundaries, only to develop an antagonistic relationship with him, much as Parisa did.

^Note 1: Age at the time of filming.

=== Duration of cast ===
Cast members	Episodes																							
Cast members	1	2	3	4	5	6	7	8	9	10	11	12	13	14	15	16	17	18	19	20	21	22	23	24
Cohutta	Featured	Featured	Featured	Featured	Featured	Featured	Featured	Featured	Featured	Featured	Featured	Featured	Featured	Featured	Featured	Featured	Featured	Featured	Featured	Featured	Featured	Featured	Featured	Featured
Dunbar	Featured	Featured	Featured	Featured	Featured	Featured	Featured	Featured	Featured	Featured	Featured	Featured	Featured	Featured	Featured	Featured	Featured	Featured	Featured	Featured	Featured	Featured	Featured	Featured
Isaac	Featured	Featured	Featured	Featured	Featured	Featured	Featured	Featured	Featured	Featured	Featured	Featured	Featured	Featured	Featured	Featured	Featured	Featured	Featured	Featured	Featured	Featured	Featured	Featured
KellyAnne	Featured	Featured	Featured	Featured	Featured	Featured	Featured	Featured	Featured	Featured	Featured	Featured	Featured	Featured	Featured	Featured	Featured	Featured	Featured	Featured	Featured	Featured	Featured	Featured
Parisa	Featured	Featured	Featured	Featured	Featured	Featured	Featured	Featured	Featured	Featured	Featured	Featured	Featured	Featured	Featured	Featured	Featured	Featured	Featured	Featured	Featured	Featured	Featured	Featured
Ashli															Entered	Featured	Featured	Featured	Featured	Featured	Featured	Featured	Featured	Featured
Trisha	Featured	Featured	Featured	Featured	Featured	Featured	Featured	Featured	Featured	Featured	Featured	Featured	Featured	Featured	Featured	Featured	Featured	removed						
Shauvon	Featured	Featured	Featured	Featured	Featured	Featured	Featured	Featured	Featured	Featured	Featured	Featured	Featured	Left										

Notes

- Shauvon voluntarily left the house in Episode 14 after wanting to return home.
- Ashli replaced Shauvon in Episode 15.
- Trisha was removed from the house in Episode 18 after shoving Parisa to the floor during a heated altercation.

== Episodes ==
No. overall	No. in season	Title	Original release date
417	1	"G'Day Australia!"	August 8, 2007
The housemates meet and settle into the house. Parisa is disappointed that Dunbar has a girlfriend. Trisha rooms with KellyAnne, and Shauvon rooms with Parisa, and thus friendships form. After Parisa greets KellyAnne and Trisha, she goes off to explore the house, and KellyAnne and Trisha, who have already done this, see this as standoffish. The men agree that KellyAnne is the most attractive of the women, though Dunbar thinks Parisa is the deepest and least shallow. The housemates go to a nightclub, where Isaac and Shauvon flirt, and KellyAnne gets drunk. At the house, KellyAnne flirts with Dunbar in the hot tub, which tests Dunbar's loyalty to his girlfriend. Parisa and Shauvon are appalled by KellyAnne's behavior, even though the men in the house agree that Parisa is jealous.
418	2	"Hittin' The Hot Tub"	August 8, 2007
Parisa and Shauvon discuss KellyAnne's behavior the previous night, and KellyAnne confronts them. Trisha and Parisa argue over a mess in the kitchen. Later, Trisha relates an incident at McDonald's in which she criticized an Asian employee's less-than-perfect English, which offends Parisa, who has experienced anti-immigrant bigotry. KellyAnne and Trisha try to gain Dunbar's sympathy in their conflict with Parisa and Shauvon, but he remains neutral. Shauvon and Isaac flirt. KellyAnne makes amends with Shauvon and Parisa.
419	3	"Suddenly Single"	August 15, 2007
Trisha argues with her boyfriend, Jarod, saying she wants to take a break. She invites a man named Alex to the house, but Cohutta and Isaac disapprove. She also helps set up a date for Shauvon, who regrets having flirted with Isaac, and wants to take advantage of local men. At a group dinner, Trisha and Alex flirt, and Parisa gets drunk, and is carried home by Dunbar. Trisha expresses dislike of her, but Shauvon defends her. Shauvon has a romantic interlude with a local man named Ky, much to Isaac's lament, and eventually, Shauvon's regret. Trisha decides to slow down to decide what she wants out of her love life. She and Parisa then get into a heated argument over the use of the email computer.
420	4	"Big Pimpin"	August 22, 2007
Parisa and Dunbar flirt, Shauvon observes chemistry between the two but feels a relationship is unlikely because of Dunbar's girlfriend. Dunbar insists that he is not flirting, because he does not like Parisa, and the two later exchange unkind words. Isaac meets an Irish woman named Noirin, and they later share the hot tub and Isaac's bed. Parisa vents her frustrations to Dunbar in a letter, but Dunbar sees a contradiction between Parisa's statement of having a crush on him, and of disapproving of KellyAnne's flirting with him.
421	5	"Mini Crush"	August 29, 2007
KellyAnne says that she and Dunbar and only friends. Dunbar, incredulous that Parisa doesn't see that he isn't interested in her, tells her he will not respond to her letter until she shows herself capable of the relationship he'd like to have with her. Thinking that Dunbar thinks she has feelings for him, KellyAnne regrets flirting with him. Dunbar criticizes Parisa’s singing, and she walks away from what she sees as abuse. KellyAnne and Cohutta flirt, and when Dunbar walks in on them in bed, he calls her “a cock-tease.”
422	6	"Getting Wet and Wild"	September 5, 2007
KellyAnne ponders her feelings for Cohutta, and when discussing this with her ex-boyfriend Sutton, she is brought to tears. Trisha flirts with Cohutta, angering KellyAnne, but Shauvon is surprised by this. Shauvon and Isaac argue, during which he calls her a "drunk, stupid slut." KellyAnne speculates that Shauvon, who had a dalliance with Isaac, is reacting to his relationship with Noirin. Isaac apologizes to Shauvon, who later regrets her behavior.
423	7	"Whining and Dining"	September 12, 2007
KellyAnne receives flowers from a man she met named Carey, but Dunbar is dismissive of this because Carey doesn't pay his own bills. He and Trisha then argue, and Dunbar storms out. Trisha and Shauvon later discuss Dunbar's anger. Dunbar later angers Parisa and Trisha over a discussion of Jesus and the Bible. Isaac speculates Dunbar's anger to be a result of lack of sex, and jokingly buys a pornographic magazine for him to aid in masturbation. KellyAnne goes on a date with Carey, but finds she'd rather be with Cohutta.
424	8	"Mardis Gras Mayhem"	September 19, 2007
Going to Gay Mardi Gras provokes anticipation from the cast, except for Cohutta, who fears being perceived as gay, and Trisha, who has religious objections to encouraging homosexuality. The two of them stay home that night, and find a lot in common. KellyAnne also keeps them company because she feels bad for Trisha who had been crying earlier that day. Shauvon is offended that Trisha referred to homosexuals as "evil". Dunbar reveals his grandfather tried to molest him as a child. Trisha and Cohutta, while eating out with KellyAnne, get into an argument after he lifts her dress. KellyAnne is upset with herself that she didn't go with the others.
425	9	"Boys Vs. Girls"	September 26, 2007
The group will plan vacation packages for Contiki Tours. Parisa's early wake-up call and singing the next day irritate Dunbar, Isaac and Trisha, who calls her singing "Christina Aguilera gone bad". After meeting with their boss, Sarah, Trisha tries driving, but Dunbar criticizes her use of a cell phone while doing so. Trisha tells Parisa that Dunbar criticized her cooking as an excuse to socialize, and her singing as well, saying she's "not as good as Christina Aguilera". When Parisa confronts Dunbar, he says it is Trisha who criticized Parisa and her singing. Parisa expresses feelings of betrayal over this to Trisha.
426	10	"Breaking the Girl Code"	October 3, 2007
Isaac teases Cohutta for having a crush on KellyAnne. Parisa and Trisha become involved in a love triangle with Alex, Trisha's date from the prior night. KellyAnne and Shauvon are sympathetic to Trisha's feelings, but feel she has no say in anything regarding Alex because she has a boyfriend. Parisa goes out with Alex, which Trisha sees as a violation of the "girl code". Shauvon observes both Parisa and Trisha making out with Alex. She reports this to Parisa, who continues seeing him.
427	11	"The Grilled Cheese Incident"	October 10, 2007
The love triangle between Parisa, Trisha and Alex continues. Shauvon relates her observations to Trisha, and when Parisa does the same with Dunbar, Shauvon sees this as a betrayal of trust. She later gets into a heated argument with Parisa, accusing her of cooking for the others and not her in order to curry favor with them. Parisa explains that Shauvon wanted something other than what she was cooking, which would've required other ingredients. Cohutta and Isaac try to defend Parisa, leading to a screaming match between Cohutta and Shauvon. Trisha later accuses Parisa get into another screaming match, during which Parisa excoriates Trisha for cheating on her boyfriend.
428	12	"Girl Fight"	October 17, 2007
Parisa and Trisha's conflict continues. Shauvon has a fling with a man named Andrew to get over her ex-fiancé, David, but she then regrets it, and is brought to tears when emailing David. Trisha ends her relationship with Alex. She does not object to Parisa continuing to see him, but when she asks her not to bring him to the house, she refuses. David and Shauvon share a tearful phone call. He asks her to come home, but she doesn’t want to cut her stay in Australia short.
429	13	"Anger Mis-Management"	October 24, 2007
Shauvon struggles between staying in Australia and reuniting with David. Dunbar and Parisa get into an argument over the cleanliness of the house, and he accuses her of being inconsiderate. Dunbar's girlfriend Julie visits. Shauvon discusses her situation with Trisha and Isaac. Parisa reacts in disbelief when Dunbar claims to have never been mean to her. He later screams at her profanely at Contiki, and is admonished by their supervisor, Chris. Dunbar says his behavior is simply how he is in life, that Parisa is far more hostile to him, and that his behavior is merely retaliatory.
430	14	"Second Fiddle"	October 31, 2007
Isaac and Dunbar advise Cohutta to cease his relationship with KellyAnne, who still has a boyfriend. Shauvon tells her housemates that she's moving out, and leaves the next morning. Contiki sends the group to Cairns, Australia. KellyAnne feels torn between Cohutta and Sutton. At a bar, she dances with a bartender named Prahn, and is disturbed by Parisa when she later does so herself, she confronts Parisa drunk later at the bar. Cohutta and KellyAnne discuss his feelings for her, she feels it is best to stop contacting Sutton.
431	15	"The New Girl"	November 7, 2007
Isaac and Noirin continue their relationship. Shauvon's replacement, Ashli, moves in. Trisha and Parisa observe that Ashli is very much like Trisha, which pleases Trisha, but disappoints Parisa, having hoped the new roommate would be one she could relate to more. Ashli feels Parisa hasn't tried to get to know her, despite her own attempts to do so. Isaac socializes with three girls he met at a bar, but ends the evening when they fail to measure up to Noirin. Trisha says Parisa has been isolating herself from the others lately, and Parisa regrets that she has treated Ashli as a stranger because of a first impression.
432	16	"The Birds"	November 14, 2007
Isaac finds out that his grandfather died, and goes home for a few days. At Contiki, the housemates form two teams competing on an assignment, and the winner will receive a trip to Europe. Ashli laments that Dunbar has a girlfriend, in light of her attraction to him, and is bothered when a blonde girl flirts with him at a club, calling her a "slut" before walking away.
433	17	"Off the Hook"	November 21, 2007
Trisha and Parisa, who both wish to speak to their loved ones, get into a heated argument over the use of the phone. Dunbar misses Julie, but gets into an argument with her over her name-calling. Dunbar flirts with Ashli, who feels they would've had sex were it not for Julie. As the housemates clean up, Parisa says she'll do her portion later, which irritates Trisha. She and Parisa later get into another argument over the phone, and when Parisa accuses of Trisha of preferring to talk to Jarod over her own family, Trisha becomes incensed and shoves Parisa to the floor. Parisa contacts the producers to complain.
434	18	"Enjoy Your Flight"	November 28, 2007
Most of the cast feel Parisa should forgive Trisha. KellyAnne predicts Parisa's remaining time in the house will be unpleasant if she sends Trisha home. Parisa feels they are unsympathetic to her point of view, and that Trisha was insincere in her apology. She sends Trisha home. Trisha sees this as confirmation that she is the better person, and accuses Parisa of sending her home because Trisha says what others think of her. Seeing this as confirmation that Trisha still looks down at everyone, Parisa responds, "Enjoy your flight. Take care." KellyAnne and Ashli resolve to make life unpleasant for Parisa. At Contiki, Ashli and Parisa are placed on the same team, to their mutual displeasure. Dunbar tells Parisa he's happy she evicted Trisha, whom he did not like.
435	19	"Friends Again"	December 5, 2007
Isaac returns, and is pleased about Trisha's eviction, arguing that no one liked her. KellyAnne insists that she did. Parisa is relieved at Isaac's statements. Not wanting to continue hating Parisa, KellyAnne begins softening towards her, and apologizes to her. Ashli acknowledges she isn't privy to what went on before she moved in, and concedes Trisha's eviction was the result of what she did. Isaac takes a nude dip in the house's human-sized fish tank. The cast enjoys a group dip in the hot tub. Dunbar has sex with Ashli, but they regret it the next day.
436	20	"Praying for a Miracle"	December 12, 2007
A broken condom provides a scare for KellyAnne and Cohutta, who ponder how their lives will change if KellyAnne turns out to be pregnant. Cohutta tells her that she must come to Georgia with him if she is with child. She is adamant that she does not want children. Meanwhile, following Dunbar and Ashli's sexual tryst (which they continue to conceal from their housemates and relatives), their relationship experiences conflict when she perceives him to be disrespectful to her. KellyAnne experiences her menstrual period, much to her relief.
437	21	"The Honeymoon is Over"	December 19, 2007
As the cast prepares their Contiki itineraries, Dunbar perceives Ashli's team to be far more well-organized than his own. He continues to argue with her, concluding that she is the most immature of the women in the house, and that all of them are "stupid". At one point they get into a heated exchange of insults and profanities. She realizes that she no longer sees him as she did when she first moved in. Cohutta sprains his ankle.
438	22	"Tourism"	December 26, 2007
The two teams lead their bus tours around Sydney. KellyAnne thinks it unprofessional of Dunbar to have informed some of the tourists that she is sleeping with Cohutta. Sarah sends Dunbar and KellyAnne home for drinking. Isaac buys drinks for their tour if they give Dunbar's team a grade of zero. Cohutta says if he can hobble on one foot for three days, Dunbar and KellyAnne can abstain from drinking. Dunbar argues with a tourist, and when KellyAnne tells him not to, he dismisses her, and Cohutta admonishes both not to leave the group, for which KellyAnne is irritated with Cohutta the next day. Cohutta realizes that KellyAnne was right and apologizes. Parisa's team wins.
439	23	"Gettin' Down"	January 2, 2008
The cast goes home in two weeks. When Noirin suggests a four-month tour of Thailand, Isaac ponders the future of their relationship. A shocking revelation on Isaac's part has the others questioning Isaac's character, and leads to tension between him and them. Parisa is forced to reevaluate her view of Alex, in light of her former conflict with Trisha.
440	24	"Moving On and Out"	January 9, 2008
As the cast's stay in the house nears its end, Ashli and Dunbar's conflict continues. KellyAnne is nervous regarding her relationship with Cohutta, which also experiences conflict. Ashli is enraged when Dunbar boasts to others that she performed oral sex on him twice. When she confronts him, he angrily calls her a "stupid bitch" and "trash". They later reconcile in an effort to leave the house as friends. KellyAnne and Cohutta reconcile, KellyAnne feels bad for pushing Cohutta away. Parisa gives each castmate a little gift before they say their good-byes.

== After filming ==
All eight cast members reunited for Escape from Oz: The Real World Sydney Reunion. Hosted by Lyndsey Rodrigues, the show was filmed in New York, and premiered January 9, 2008. The cast members discussed their lives both during and since the filming of the show. Dunbar stated that he and Julie were still together, and had moved in together, though there was still occasional tension as a result of his infidelity with Ashli. The cast also discussed his temper flare-ups with Parisa and Ashli. Cohutta and KellyAnne revealed that they were still together, and that KellyAnne visited North Georgia, where she met Cohutta's father. (Their romance ended by the time they appeared on Real World/Road Rules Challenge: The Island.) Isaac stated that his now-long-distance relationship with Noirin was "complicated", that they were talking, and that its future was ambiguous. Shauvon revealed that she and David were no longer together. She and the others also discussed the "Grilled Cheese Incident". Trisha and Parisa discussed their love triangle with Alex, and the shoving incident, both asserting that there were no remaining ill feelings between them. Trisha also explained the incident with the Asian McDonald's employee by saying that she mis-worded her initial explanation of the incident, but that it was not motivated by racism. She also insisted that her refusal to go to the gay pride parade was not motivated by homophobia, as she supports gay rights, but felt a conflict between the amount of partying she had been doing and her religious upbringing, and decided not to go out partying again, regardless of what the celebration was for.

At the 2008 The Real World Awards Bash, KellyAnne was nominated in the "Hottest Female" category and Isaac in the "Hottest Male" one, KellyAnne and Cohutta were also in the running for "Favorite Love Story", as well as Dunbar for "Best Phonecall Gone Bad", and both Shauvon and Trisha for "Gone Baby Gone", with the latter also receiving a nomination for the "Roommate you Love to Hate" award.

On November 5, 2008, it was revealed on the Real World/Road Rules Challenge: The Island reunion special that KellyAnne Judd was dating Wes Bergmann of The Real World: Austin at the time. On the reunion for Real World/Road Rules Challenge: The Ruins, which aired on December 16, 2009, Wes and KellyAnne revealed that they were no longer together, but were attempting to resolve the status of their relationship. On September 14, 2025, Judd married Max Alpert.

In 2009, Isaac and Noirin eventually broke up. In 2010, they both appeared on the tenth series of the British version Big Brother. Norin entered on Day 1, while Isacc entered on Day 54. Noirin was evicted by the Viewer's Vote on Day 56, with Isaac choosing to leave shortly after.

Cohutta Grindstaff and Isaac Stout opened and co-own a concert venue, The Bad Manor, in Athens, Georgia. It opened May 8, 2010, and it is located in downtown Athens at 346 E. Broad St. On June 10, 2023, Grindstaff welcomed his first daughter.

Parisa Montazaran's debut album, Intelegance, which mixes hip-hop and dance beats with influences from her Persian heritage, was released November 24, 2008.

In 2012, Dunbar published a paperback titled Crazy Sh*t Republicans Say.

=== The Challenge ===
Cast member	Seasons of The Challenge	Other appearances
Cohutta Lee Grindstaff	The Island, The Ruins, Free Agents, Battle of the Bloodlines	The Challenge: All Stars (season 2)
Dunbar Flinn Merrill	The Island, The Duel II, The Ruins, Cutthroat (2010), Battle of the Exes, Rivals II	—N/a
Isaac Stout	The Duel II, Free Agents	—N/a
KellyAnne Judd	The Island, The Ruins, Battle of the Bloodlines, Rivals III, Battle of the Eras	The Challenge: All Stars (season 1), The Challenge: All Stars (season 3), The Challenge: All Stars (season 5), The Challenge: World Championship
Parisa Montazaran	—N/a	—N/a
Shauvon Torres	The Duel II, The Ruins, Cutthroat (2010)	—N/a
Trisha Cummings	—N/a	—N/a
Ashli Robson	The Island	—N/a

Note: KellyAnne, Dunbar, Ashli, and Isaac were originally cast for The Challenge: Battle of the Seasons, and flew out to Turkey to participate. However, they were removed prior to the start of the first challenge due to Stout supposedly not passing his medical test, which turned out to be a false negative, and they were replaced by the Fresh Meat team.
