= Road Rules: X-Treme =

- Season 13
- Starring: Danny Dias; Derrick Kosinski; Ibis Nieves; Jodi Weatherton; Kina Dean; Patrick Maloney; Nick Haggart; Angela Trimbur; Jillian Zoboroski; X the Dog
- No. of episodes: 17

Release
- Original network: MTV
- Original release: June 7 – September 27, 2004

Season chronology
- ← Previous; Road Rules: South Pacific Next → Road Rules: Viewers' Revenge

Road Rules: X-Treme is the thirteenth season of the MTV reality television series Road Rules, which takes a group of young people and places them on a series of quests and challenges to compete for prizes. X-Treme took place in South America, in Argentina and Chile. It was the first and only Road Rules season to have a dog to be credited as part of the cast.

== Cast ==
Cast member	Age^{1}	Hometown
Danny Dias	20	Linden, NJ
Derrick Kosinski	20	Chicago, IL
Ibis Nieves	19	Weston, FL
Jodi Weatherton	22	Falls Church, VA
Kina Dean	19	Pennsville, NJ
Patrick Maloney	20	Park Ridge, IL
Nick Haggart	21	Detroit Lakes, MN
Angela Trimbur	22	Los Angeles, CA
Jillian Zoboroski	18	Coral Springs, FL
X the Dog	—N/a	Chile

- ^Note 1: At time of filming.

=== Duration of cast ===
Cast member	Episodes																
Cast member	1	2	3	4	5	6	7	8	9	10	11	12	13	14	15	16	17
Derrick	FEAT	FEAT	FEAT	FEAT	FEAT	FEAT	FEAT	FEAT	FEAT	FEAT	FEAT	FEAT	FEAT	FEAT	FEAT	FEAT	FEAT
Jodi	FEAT	FEAT	FEAT	FEAT	FEAT	FEAT	FEAT	FEAT	FEAT	FEAT	FEAT	FEAT	FEAT	FEAT	FEAT	FEAT	FEAT
Patrick	FEAT	FEAT	FEAT	FEAT	FEAT	FEAT	FEAT	FEAT	FEAT	FEAT	FEAT	FEAT	FEAT	FEAT	FEAT	FEAT	FEAT
Nick							REP. (Note: Nick replaced Danny in Episode 7)	FEAT	FEAT	FEAT	FEAT	FEAT	FEAT	FEAT	FEAT	FEAT	FEAT
Angela									REP. (Note: Angela replaced Kina in Episode 9)	FEAT	FEAT	FEAT	FEAT	FEAT	FEAT	FEAT	FEAT
Jillian											REP. (Note: Jillian replaced Ibis in Episode 11)	FEAT	FEAT	FEAT	FEAT	FEAT	FEAT
Ibis	FEAT	FEAT	FEAT	FEAT	FEAT	FEAT	FEAT	FEAT	FEAT	VOTE (Note: Ibis was voted out in Episode 10 as a punishment for losing a mission)							
Kina	FEAT	FEAT	FEAT	FEAT	FEAT	FEAT	FEAT	FEAT	VOTE (Note: Kina was voted out in Episode 9 by random draw)								
Danny	FEAT	FEAT	FEAT	FEAT	FEAT	VOTE (Note: Danny was voted out in Episode 6 as a punishment for perceived weakness in a mission)											

Table key
FEAT = Cast member is featured on this episode
REP. = Cast member replaces another cast member
VOTE = Cast member is voted out of the show

== Missions ==
#	Challenge	Result	Notes
1	Volcano Bungee	Completed	The cast members meet and begin to bond. This mission involves the cast members dividing up into three pairs (Jodi/Danny, Kina/Patrick, and Derrick/Ibis) and then bungee jumping out of a helicopter over Chile's most active volcano. Later, the cast members gather at a local's bonfire, where Derrick's drunken behavior embarrasses the rest of the cast.
2	Waterfall Rappel	Completed	The cast goes out the night before the mission, leading to Danny getting extremely drunk and ill. Derrick's derogatory comments about Danny's sexuality cause Kina to reprimand him. Cast members must rappel down a waterfall with 45 degree Fahrenheit water and land at various ledges within six seconds of their partner (Derrick/Danny, Jodi/Kina, Ibis/Patrick). Derrick and Danny bond during and after the mission, and Derrick apologizes for his remarks.
3	Living Art	Completed	Patrick and Jodi talk about Patrick's girlfriend back home. Derrick's rough-housing causes a knee injury. This mission involves the cast members shaving off all of their body hair. They must pose motionless and nude in a window on a public street as living, body-painted art objects for an hour. Patrick moves his foot, causing the group to have to pose 15 minutes longer. Ibis has reservations about posing nude, but overcomes these and completes the mission. Jodi and Patrick exhibit an attraction to one another and end up kissing. The flirtation with Jodi causes Patrick to reflect upon his relationship at home, and he calls his girlfriend to break up.
4	Don't Have A Cow	Failed	Derrick and Kina grow closer, but Kina feels it might have gone too far when Derrick tries to kiss her. This mission involves the cast members eating certain parts of a cow, including eyes, brain, tongue, and internal organs. They must divide into pairs (Derrick/Kina, Danny/Jodi, Patrick/Ibis) and feed each other a certain portion in five minutes. One teammate (Patrick) will be a "leftover eater" and eat what everyone else did not. Danny freaks out and under-performs, leaving a lot of leftovers for Patrick. Patrick is unable to finish the leftover plate in five minutes, and they fail the mission. The cast begins looking at possibilities for whom to vote off if they lose another mission, with Danny being the major target. The cast comes across a stray puppy, and they adopt her and name her X.
5	Hold On	Completed	Danny feels offended and outcast by Patrick and Derrick's intolerance of his sexuality. Derrick crashes the RV into a tree, causing significant damage. Derrick is taken by the Chilean police to do a routine blood test to check for alcohol and have his license confiscated, causing him to miss the mission despite a frantic effort in a taxi to try to find the location. The goal of this mission is find the hidden X-Treme key in an airplane hangar by solving four clues. Four cast members must draw a picture of a word given to them by a pilot while doing stunts in an airplane. Jodi must then use the drawings to solve the puzzles and reveal the clues to find the key and free round-trip tickets to Europe for every cast member. Despite earlier reservations, the cast members are happy with Danny's performance in this mission. Ibis encourages Danny to stand up to Derrick's intolerance, causing Derrick to become apologetic. The cast is given a van to use while their RV is being repaired, much to their disappointment.
6	Blind Driving	Failed	This mission involves the cast members splitting into three pairs (Ibis/Derrick, Kina/Jodi, Patrick/Danny), with one person in each pair controlling the steering and clutch of a dune buggies while the other person controls the gas and the brake while blindfolded. Pairs must make three laps around the designated track, and the total time of all nine laps must be less than twenty minutes. The cast fails the mission and has to vote someone off as a result. Danny and Jodi are discussed among the possibilities of people to vote off due to their performances in the missions, but everyone votes off Danny because they don't feel he fits into their clique. Danny departs feeling upset and betrayed by the decision. The rest of the cast expresses sadness at his exit.
7	Go Fetch	Completed	The cast expresses their disdain for the interim van and its cramped, smelly conditions; they wish for their RV to be repaired and returned to them. The cast shares their reluctance to accept a new member into their group: 22-year-old Nick from Minnesota who arrives to replace the voted-off Danny. The cast moves back into their RV and meets Nick at the same time. Although the original cast is not thrilled to have a new member and worry about his ability to excel in missions, the girls are excited to find out that Nick is gay. The originals resent that Nick is immune from the first vote-off if they should lose another mission. This mission involves the cast splitting up into pairs (Derrick/Ibis, Nick/Jodi, Kina/Patrick) and retrieving bones from a large dog house while fending off several attacking dogs in under a minute. Nick proves himself in the mission and impresses the original cast members.
8	Leap of Faith	Failed	Kina's 20th birthday arrives and the cast celebrates. Jodi hooks up with a guy, which causes Kina and Ibis to criticize her behavior when she is drunk; a rift begins to form between Kina and Jodi. In this mission, cast members must form pairs (Jodi/Patrick, Nick/Kina, Ibis/Derrick) and jump out of a helicopter into targets set up around a lake. The smaller targets are worth more points than the bigger ones, and the cast members must earn 40 points to complete the mission. One player will be blindfolded and their partner must tell them when to jump. The group fails the mission, and Jodi's lackluster performance causes Kina to question her overall skill. Although the original five cast members made a pact to pick names out of a hat for the vote-off, they consider simply voting out Jodi instead. However, they decide to stick to their plan and choose randomly because of their loyalty.
9	Balance on Me	Completed	Kina's name is pulled the most, and she is upset at going home but proud of her decision to pull names out of a hat instead of turning on another cast member and voting them out. Derrick, in particular, shows the most disappointment. Jodi feels guilty that Kina left instead of her. 22-year-old Angela from Los Angeles arrives to replace Kina. Derrick and Patrick immediately are attracted to Angela but are disappointed to learn she has a serious boyfriend. Angela comments negatively about the others, painting them as frat boy and sorority girl types. However, she also shares her past as a member of the oppressive Jehovah's Witnesses denomination. This mission involves each person crossing a tightrope that is 150 feet above the ground. Cast members must hold hands with the person on either side of them and the entire cast must move across the ropes at the same time. Ibis and Patrick argue over the best strategy to complete the mission. Patrick struggles in the mission, but Jodi takes the lead and calms everyone down with her direction; the rest of the cast are impressed with her improved communication skills. Angela questions her decision to join the show but Patrick reassures her and makes her feel more comfortable.
10	Falling at Your Feet	Failed	Nick and Derrick get involved in a slight tiff, which angers Derrick and causes him to belittle Nick in front of the other cast mates. The others (with the exception of Angela) agree that they do not get along with Nick. Nick, however, feels that the original cast members purposefully exclude him from social activities. This mission involves the cast splitting into three pairs (Angela/Ibis, Jodi/Derrick, Patrick/Nick), with each pair standing on a pillar and holding hands. The pillar is yanked from under them by a semi truck driving at full speed past the pillar, and the object of the mission is for both players to land on a square on the ground on their feet still holding hands without any other body part touching the ground. Ibis loses the mission for the team. Although some of the cast members want to vote off Nick for personal reasons, they decide to vote off Ibis due to her performance in the mission.
11	Blind Leading the Blind	Completed	Angela begins to feel more accepted by the group, and grows closer to Patrick in particular. 18-year-old Jillian from Florida arrives at the mission to replace Ibis. Patrick is attracted to her, but Angela and Jodi are disappointed with how young she is. This mission begins with the cast being taught how to tango, and sparks fly between Jillian and Patrick. Angela quickly expresses annoyance at Jillian during the mission, which, in turn, annoys Patrick. Cast members must tango blindfolded on a platform that is 100 feet above the ground. Points are awarded for style and the length of time cast members stay on the platform, and the whole group must earn a total of 450 points. Angela jeopardizes the mission, but Patrick and Jillian are able to win it for the team. Angela continues to complain about Jillian's presence, which Jodi attributes to the shift in Patrick and Derrick's attention to the new girl. Jillian and Patrick's flirting leads to sex on her first night, which angers Angela even more.
12	Measure Up	Completed	Jillian and Patrick grow closer, but the other cast members, especially Angela, are uneasy about the relationship. Angela spends all of her time complaining about Jillian, which provokes Nick to try and reason with Angela to give Jillian a chance. Angela then expresses her homesickness and desire to go home. The object of this mission is to collect a cup of sweat from all six people combined in an hour. Angela barely participates due to her desire to be voted out. After successfully completing the mission, the group reflects upon Angela's negativity and refusal to be a team player. Angela has a breakdown over the experience, but Derrick cheers her up and motivates her to stay. Jillian and Angela have a discussion about their past in an effort to get to know each other.
13	Face Off (Part 1)	Completed	Derrick gets drunk and opens up to Angela about his past, and she gives him advice for "getting his life on the right path". The Road Rules: South Pacific cast shows up and surprises the X-Treme cast members. They learn that the two casts will be competing in a series of face-off games. The first event is a relay race, in which every person must run one mile. The X-Treme cast, though with a rocky start from Derrick, wins this game. The second event involves one player from each cast entering a pen and trying to catch a chicken. The X-Treme cast starts off behind but eventually wins this event as well. At Angela's beckoning, Chris from South Pacific discusses Derrick's drinking and drug problems and offers him advice. The third event involves one player from each cast facing off against each other and breaking a row of boards as fast as possible using only their fists. The X-Treme cast wins this event too, due to Cara's inability to break the boards. Derrick starts avoiding drinking in an effort to make better choices. Patrick's flirting with Mary-Beth makes Jillian jealous.
14	Face Off (Part 2)	Completed	Jillian starts flirting with Abram in retaliation for Patrick's flirting with Mary-Beth, to which Abram is appreciative. The next event is for each player to drink 6 raw eggs as fast as possible. Jillian and Mary-Beth's dislike towards each other increases. South Pacific wins this event, their first one so far. The final event of the face-off consists of four boxing matches between the cast members from opposing teams, where the winner must either knock out their opponent or make them quit. Tina destroys Angela, causing Angela to break down. Derrick crushes Chris and causes his nose to bleed. Jillian and Mary-Beth's rivalry comes to a head in the match in which Jillian defeats Mary-Beth. Patrick's beat down causes Abram to quit. The X-Treme cast ends up winning the face-off and receiving $2,000 each. The cast bonds over their win and Jillian's feelings for Patrick deepen.
15	Stunt School	Completed	Angela continues to be homesick and have breakdowns over her dissatisfaction with the Road Rules experience. The other cast members are fed up with her tantrums and complaints. Angela and Derrick have an argument about her negative attitude. This mission involves the cast members learning how to perform various stunts in order to perform them in a movie scene. Jodi's acting skills come into question, while Angela is excited because she wants to be an actress. Angela is able to use her past experience with acting to help Jodi improve upon her skills, and all of the cast members are pleased with Angela's performance in this mission. They also notice a change in her overall demeanor for the better.
16	Gondola Rescue	Completed	Jillian and Patrick's expectations from their relationship are revealed to be different: Jillian feels she is falling in love with Patrick, but Patrick insists that their connection is purely physical. This mission involves the cast completing a gondola rescue on a mountaintop. Four cast members go on one gondola, and they must transfer a stretcher and medicine bag to another gondola, where they must put one person on the stretcher and lower them to the ground safely. Patrick is chosen to play the victim, much to everyone's chagrin because he is usually a leader in the missions. However, the cast completes the mission and are reassured that even without Patrick's help, they are still a good team. Patrick shows signs of not being over his ex, which leads to rude comments that confuse and offend Jillian. Derrick, in turn, berates Patrick for his treatment of Jillian, while Angela remarks that their relationship will only end in heartbreak for Jillian.
17	Surprise Bridge Over Troubled Water	Completed	The cast arrives to their final mission, which is to cross two rickety bridges within 90 minutes. The bridges have several "surprises", which are obstacles that the cast must navigate to make it to the other side. Angela messes up on the second bridge and almost ruins the mission, but is eventually able to cross the second bridge in time. Thus the cast completes their final mission. Then they receive their handsome reward, a Subaru WXRI for each cast member. The cast then reflects upon their experiences in South America.

== Episodes ==
No. overall	No. in season	Title	Original release date
189	1	"Volcano Bungee"	June 7, 2004
190	2	"Waterfall Rappel"	June 14, 2004
191	3	"Living Art"	June 21, 2004
192	4	"Don't Have a Cow"	June 28, 2004
193	5	"Hold On!"	July 5, 2004
194	6	"Blind Driving"	July 12, 2004
195	7	"Go Fetch"	July 19, 2004
196	8	"Leap Of Faith"	July 26, 2004
197	9	"Balance On Me"	August 2, 2004
198	10	"Falling At Your Feet"	August 9, 2004
199	11	"Blind Leading The Blind"	August 16, 2004
200	12	"Measure Up"	August 23, 2004
201	13	"Face Off"	August 30, 2004
202	14	"Face Off (2)"	September 6, 2004
203	15	"Stunt School"	September 13, 2004
204	16	"Gondola Rescue"	September 20, 2004
205	17	"Handsome Reward"	September 27, 2004

== After filming ==
Kina returned to the series as part of the alumni cast of Road Rules 2007: Viewers' Revenge.

Jodi lives internationally with her husband and their son.

On June 7, 2017, Dias was found dead in his Brooklyn apartment at the age of 34, with a drug-related suicide being cited as the possible cause of his death.

In July 2018, Trimbur was diagnosed with breast cancer. She is now cancer-free and has had several notable acting and dancing roles.

In 2022, Kosinksi married Nicole Gruman. Kosinski also has a son with ex-wife Amy Manchin.

=== The Challenge ===
Cast member	Seasons of The Challenge	Other appearances
Danny Dias	The Gauntlet 2	—N/a
Derrick Kosinski	Battle of the Sexes 2, The Inferno II, The Gauntlet 2, Fresh Meat, The Duel, The Inferno 3, The Island, The Ruins, Cutthroat (2010), XXX: Dirty 30, Battle of the Eras, Vets & New Threats	The Challenge: All Stars (season 1), The Challenge: All Stars (season 2), The Challenge: All Stars (season 3)
Ibis Nieves	Battle of the Sexes 2, The Gauntlet 2, The Ruins	—N/a
Jodi Weatherton	The Inferno II, The Gauntlet 2, The Duel, Battle of the Eras	The Challenge: All Stars (season 2), The Challenge: World Championship
Kina Dean	Battle of the Sexes 2, The Gauntlet 2, The Duel	—N/a
Patrick Maloney	—N/a	—N/a
Nick Haggart	Battle of the Sexes 2	—N/a
Angela Trimbur	Battle of the Sexes 2	—N/a
Jillian Zoboroski	The Gauntlet 2, The Gauntlet III, Fresh Meat II	—N/a

Note: Derrick made an appearance on Vendettas for an elimination
