= Lyndsey Rodrigues =

Australian TV and radio host (born 1981)

Lyndsey Rodriques
- Born: 23 July 1981 (age 45)
- Occupations: TV and radio host, actress, VJ

Lyndsey Rodrigues (born 23 July 1981) is an Australian TV and radio host, actress and former MTV VJ, known as a co-host of the MTV TV series Total Request Live. She has also hosted other MTV programs, such as Escape from Oz: The Real World Sydney Reunion, Trim the Fat: The Gauntlet III Reunion and The Real World Hollywood: Reunion.

She is of Portuguese and British descent.

== Career ==
After the cancellation of Total Request Live, Rodrigues appeared on TV and radio programs in her native Australia, including three 2009 episodes of AFHV: World’s Funniest Videos, and Channel Nine's lifestyle show What's Good For You. She also reported the weather on Channel Nine News with Peter Overton.

In 2009, she co-hosted the Logies Red Carpet with Jules Lund and Shelley Craft as well as appearing on the cover of Men's Style Magazine and in a 6-page spread where she appears topless.

She played Guy Sebastian's love interest in the "Like It Like That" music video, as well as being in the inaugural advertising campaign for V Australia.

Rodrigues has also hosted Breakfast Radio for both Mix 106.5 and Edge 96.1.

Rodrigues currently resides in New York City, working as a model, TV host and actress.

Rodrigues is the host of Hello Style and Cosmo's series "Sexy vs Skanky" as well as the New York correspondent for Axs Live TV.

She is also the host of Hello Style Live and frequently hosts other live events throughout New York City.

On 25 July 2018, Rodrigues hosted the first HQ Trivia Australian edition.
