= Hyenas (2011 film) =

- Directed by: Eric Weston
- Written by: Eric Weston
- Produced by: Ron Bard
- Starring: Costas Mandylor; Meshach Taylor; Christa Campbell
- Cinematography: Curtis Petersen
- Edited by: Eric Weston
- Music by: Eliza Swenson
- Production companies: Entertainment Dome; Entertainment Lab
- Distributed by: Grindstone Entertainment Group/Lionsgate
- Release date: April 19, 2011
- Running time: 92 minutes
- Country: United States
- Language: English

Hyenas is a 2011 American supernatural horror film written and directed by Eric Weston. The film stars Costas Mandylor, Meshach Taylor, Christa Campbell, Derrick Kosinski, Joshua Alba, Christina Murphy and Amanda Aardsma.

== Plot ==
A woman is driving down a road when she crashes. She then sees a light, before hyenas attack and kill her and her baby. The woman's husband, Gannon (Costas Mandylor), teams up with veteran tracker "Crazy" Briggs (Meshach Taylor) to track down and kill the hyenas.

== Cast ==
- Costas Mandylor as Gannon
- Christa Campbell as Wilda
- Amanda Aardsma as Valerie
- Derrick Kosinski as Bobby
- Rudolf Martin as Sheriff Manfred
- Joshua Alba as Marco
- Christina Murphy as Gina
- Andrew James Allen as Jasper
- Steele Justiss as "Tank"
- Meshach Taylor as "Crazy" Briggs
- Bar Paly as Luna
- Sean Hamilton as Tobias
- Maxie J. Santillan Jr. as Salazar
- Michael Nardelli as Vinnie
- Stephen Taylor as Danny
- Mike Rad as Orville

== Reception ==
Hyenas was described by Bryan Senn in his book The Werewolf Filmography as "poor in all departments", commenting on Amanda Aardsma's "plastic acting" and "cartoonish CGI hyenas". Bruce Kooken, for Horrornews.net, described the special effects as "crash and burn...the CGI effect is really unforgivable".
