= Road Rules: The Quest =

- Season 10
- Starring: Adam Larson; Blair Herter; Ellen Cho; Jisela Delgado; Sophia Pasquis; Steve Meinke; Katie Doyle
- No. of episodes: 16

Release
- Original network: MTV
- Original release: July 9 – October 29, 2001

Season chronology
- ← Previous; Road Rules: Maximum Velocity Tour Next → Road Rules: Campus Crawl

Road Rules: The Quest is the tenth season of the MTV reality television series Road Rules. It first aired on MTV in 2001, and featured six strangers chosen to compete in missions, while living in a RV. In this particular season, the contestants drove their RV to missions in Morocco and Spain, with a final mission in the United States. The season also was the first to have a rule where the cast would potentially have to vote a cast member off if the cast failed to meet a certain set of rules pertaining to successful missions completed.

This season of Road Rules was the first and only season to be preceded by a casting special in which 27 potential cast members for the tenth season of both The Real World and Road Rules spent time together for a week to see how they interacted to be selected for one of the two shows.

== Cast ==
Cast member	Age^{1}	Hometown
Adam Larson	22	Wickford, RI
Blair Herter	20	Scott, LA
Ellen Cho	23	Iowa City, IA
Jisela Delgado	20	Tampa, FL
Sophia Pasquis	23	Elmont, NY
Steve Meinke	23	Leavenworth, KS
Katie Doyle	21	Keller, TX

- ^Note 1: At time of filming.

== Missions ==
#	Mission	Result	Crest	Notes
1	Climb Down Helicopter Ladder/Cross Dessert	Failed	Determination	Recovered in an unaired bonus mission
2	Snake Charming	Completed	Patience	
3-4	Mission Involving Fire	Completed	Faith	Mission Not Aired
3-4	Mission Involving Kara Prison	Completed	Valor	Mission Not Aired
5	Complete an Eco Challenge Course	Failed	Endurance	Jisela voted out; Katie replaces her
6	Fly Through Fire	Completed	Courage	Endurance also gained via Katie's arrival
7	Take Part in Spain's "Human Tower"	Completed	Trust	
8	Retrieve Crest from Guarded Tower	Completed	Teamwork	
9	Bungee Jump with Strangers Combined Age of 300	Completed	Ingenuity	
10	Take Part in Army Training	Completed	Perseverance	

== Episodes ==
No. overall	No. in season	Title	Original release date
139	1	"Quest for the Crest"	July 9, 2001
140	2	"Snakes, Snakes Everywhere"	July 16, 2001
141	3	"Sex, Camels, and Deliveries"	July 23, 2001
142	4	"Falling Head over Heals"	July 30, 2001
143	5	"Hanging by a Line"	August 6, 2001
144	6	"One by the Wayside"	August 13, 2001
145	7	"Enter the Katie"	August 20, 2001
146	8	"Just Eat Cake"	September 3, 2001
147	9	"Up a Slick Pole"	September 10, 2001
148	10	"Swimming in the Dating Pool"	September 17, 2001
149	11	"Jumping with the Jones"	September 24, 2001
150	12	"Hanging by a Line"	October 1, 2001
151	13	"Pigeons and Quitters"	October 8, 2001
152	14	"Desert Dueling"	October 15, 2001
153	15	"Unfair Warfare"	October 22, 2001
154	16	"Sad Goodbyes"	October 29, 2001

== After filming ==
Adam returned to the series as part of the alumni cast of Road Rules 2007: Viewers' Revenge. After meeting Averey Tressler from The Real World: Portland on the fourth season of The Challenge: All Stars, he proposed to her in 2025. Larson has two daughters from a previous relationship, Hunter and Harlow.

In 2005, Ellen's first child was born.

Blair Herter married Jessica Chobot on February 18, 2012. The couple's first child, Emerson Roland Herter, was born on March 6, 2013.

Katie married Cory Cooley. In 2015, their first daughter, Avery Ryan Cooley, was born.

=== The Challenge ===
This is the only season of Road Rules whose entire cast has at one time or another competed in MTV's spin-off reality series The Challenge.

Cast member	Seasons of The Challenge	Other appearances
Adam Larson	Battle of the Seasons (2002), The Gauntlet, The Gauntlet 2	The Challenge: All Stars (season 4), The Challenge: All Stars (season 5)
Blair Herter	Battle of the Sexes	—N/a
Ellen Cho	Battle of the Sexes	—N/a
Jisela Delgado	Battle of the Seasons (2002), Battle of the Sexes, The Gauntlet 2	The Challenge: All Stars (season 1)
Sophia Pasquis	Battle of the Sexes 2	The Challenge: All Stars (season 2)
Steve Meinke	The Gauntlet	The Challenge: All Stars (season 2), The Challenge: All Stars (season 4), The Challenge: All Stars (season 5)
Katie Doyle	The Gauntlet, The Inferno, Battle of the Sexes 2, The Gauntlet 2, Fresh Meat, The Gauntlet III, The Duel II, The Ruins, Cutthroat (2010), Battle of the Eras	The Challenge: All Stars (season 1), The Challenge: All Stars (season 2), The Challenge: All Stars (season 5)
