= Derrick Kosinski =

Reality TV personality

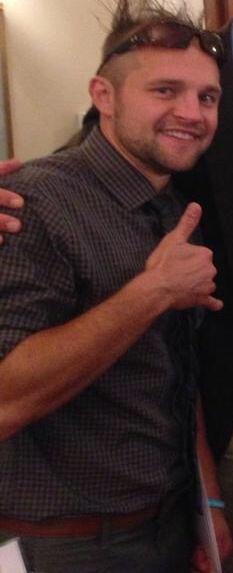
- Born: July 17, 1983 (age 42)
- Occupations: TV personality Podcaster
- Known for: The Challenge
- Height: 1.7 m (5 ft 7 in)

Derrick Kosinski (born August 17, 1983) is an American reality television personality, podcaster, and occasional professional wrestler. known for his appearances on MTV's The Challenge. He first appeared on Road Rules: X-Treme.

== Early life and career ==
Kosinski was born and grew up in Chicago, Illinois. He went to Maine East high school a Chicago suburb. Kosinski also attended Oakton Community College. He played men's basketball in the Oakton College from 2002-2003. Later he applied to be a part of reality TV show and got accepted. He started his television career in 2004 when he was cast on Road Rules: X-Treme. In 2023, Kosinski made his debut in wrestling and joined Boca Raton Championship Wrestling along with Mark Long.

== Personal life ==
Kosinski is married to Nicole Gruman since July 22, 2022. They have a son, born on May 12, 2024. He has a son from a prior marriage.

== Filmography ==
=== Film ===
- Hyenas (2011) as Bobby

=== Reality shows ===
- Road Rules: X-Treme (2004)
- Real World/Road Rules Challenge: Battle of the Sexes 2 (2004–2005)
- Real World/Road Rules Challenge: The Inferno II (2005)
- Real World/Road Rules Challenge: The Gauntlet 2 (2005–2006)
- Real World/Road Rules Challenge: Fresh Meat (2006)
- Real World/Road Rules Challenge: The Duel (2006–2007)
- Real World/Road Rules Challenge: The Inferno 3 (2007)
- Real World/Road Rules Challenge: The Island (2008)
- Real World/Road Rules Challenge: The Ruins (2009)
- The Challenge: Cutthroat (2010)
- The Challenge XXX: Dirty 30 (2017)
- The Challenge: Vendettas (2018)
- The Challenge: All Stars (season 1) (2021)
- The Challenge: All Stars (season 2) (2021–2022)
- The Challenge: All Stars (season 3) (2022)
- The Challenge 40: Battle of the Eras (2024)
- The Challenge: Vets & New Threats (2025)
