= Real World/Road Rules Challenge: The Gauntlet 2 =

11th season of the reality television series

The Gauntlet 2
- Season 11
- Presented by: T. J. Lavin
- No. of contestants: 32
- Winners: Alton Williams; Ibis Nieves; Jamie Murray; Jodi Weatherton; Kina Dean; Landon Lueck; MJ Garrett; Randy Barry; Susie Meister
- Location: Trinidad and Tobago
- Opening theme: "Anthem" by Superchick
- No. of episodes: 18

Release
- Original network: MTV
- Original release: December 5, 2005 – March 27, 2006

Season chronology
- ← Previous; The Inferno II Next → Fresh Meat

Real World/Road Rules Challenge: The Gauntlet 2 is the 11th season of the MTV reality game show, The Challenge (at the time known as Real World/Road Rules Challenge).

The Gauntlet II marked T. J. Lavin's first time presenting the series, regularly hosting the program from this season forward. Prior seasons only used temporary hosts. The season is the second in the Gauntlet series, with the original Gauntlet airing in 2003–2004 and The Gauntlet III following in 2008.

== Format ==
The teams were designated Veterans and Rookies, based on the number of prior seasons of Real World/Road Rules Challenge on which each cast member had competed. Those on the Veterans team had been on at least two prior seasons, and those on the Rookies team had been on fewer than two seasons. For this season, a male and female captain were determined at the beginning of the season. After each team challenge, the losing team captain was sent to the "Gauntlet", where they would face an opponent of the same sex and same team who was voted into the Gauntlet by the respective team. Contestants competed for over $300,000 in rewards.

== Contestants ==
Veterans team
| Player | Original season | Finish |
|---|---|---|
| Aneesa Ferreira | The Real World: Chicago | Runner-up |
| David Burns | The Real World: Seattle | Runner-up |
| Julie Stoffer | The Real World: New Orleans | Runner-up |
| Katie Doyle | Road Rules: The Quest | Runner-up |
| Mark Long | Road Rules: USA – The First Adventure | Runner-up |
| Robin Hibbard | The Real World: San Diego | Runner-up |
| Timmy Beggy | Road Rules: USA – The Second Adventure | Runner-up |
| Derrick Kosinski | Road Rules: X-Treme | Episode 17 |
| Brad Fiorenza | The Real World: San Diego | Episode 14 |
| Beth Stolarczyk | The Real World: Los Angeles | Episode 13 (Note: Beth refused to compete in the "Beach Brawl" Gauntlet. Aneesa became the new team captain by default.) |
| Syrus Yarbrough | The Real World: Boston | Episode 10 |
| Montana McGlynn | The Real World: Boston | Episode 9 |
| Ace Amerson | The Real World: Paris | Episode 8 |
| Ruthie Alcaide | The Real World: Hawaii | Episode 7 |
| Jisela Delgado | Road Rules: The Quest | Episode 5 |
| Adam Larson | Road Rules: The Quest | Episode 2 |

Rookies team
| Player | Original season | Finish |
|---|---|---|
| Alton Williams | The Real World: Las Vegas | Winner |
| Ibis Nieves | Road Rules: X-Treme | Winner |
| Jamie Murray (Note: Jamie was placed on the Rookies team, despite this being his third time as a contestant on the series following Extreme Challenge and Battle of the Sexes.) | The Real World: New Orleans | Winner |
| Jodi Weatherton | Road Rules: X-Treme | Winner |
| Kina Dean | Road Rules: X-Treme | Winner |
| Landon Lueck | The Real World: Philadelphia | Winner |
| MJ Garrett | The Real World: Philadelphia | Winner |
| Randy Barry | The Real World: San Diego | Winner |
| Susie Meister | Road Rules: Down Under | Winner |
| Jillian Zoboroski | Road Rules: X-Treme | Episode 15 |
| Jeremy Blossom | Road Rules: South Pacific | Episode 12 |
| Cara Zavaleta | Road Rules: South Pacific | Episode 11 |
| Adam King | The Real World: Paris | Episode 6 |
| Danny Dias | Road Rules: X-Treme | Episode 4 |
| Cameran Eubanks | The Real World: San Diego | Episode 3 (Note: Cameran gave the win to Kina, and did not compete in the "Capture The Flag" Gauntlet.) |
| Jo Rhodes | The Real World: San Francisco | Episode 2 (Note: Jo withdrew from the game in Episode 1 before the first challenge. As a result, Kina was named team captain for coming in second in the Captain's challenge.) |

== Gameplay ==
=== Challenge games ===
- Royal Rumble: Players, divided by gender and team, are placed on a raft. The last male and female standing for each team are named the captains. Some chose to use rock-paper-scissors to decide who should be the last one standing.
  - Winners: Alton, Jo, Ruthie & Adam L.
- Chock Full o' Coconuts: Players must work in pairs to transfer a total of 200 coconuts using bamboo sticks. If they lose coconuts long the way, a player has to pick-up the coconuts. The first team to transfer all of their coconuts in the designated area wins.
  - Winners: Rookies
- Team Builders: Teams compete in a series of tasks to complete in order. The first team to advance all of their players through the obstacle course wins.
  - Team Bridge: Players are provided with tires and wooden boards, that they must use to get to the second station without touching the ground. If a player touches the ground, the whole team has to start over.
  - Up and Over: With the help of a wooden board, players must go over a suspended rope without touching it. If a player touches the rope, the whole team has to start over.
  - Carry the Load: Players must carry a ball up and down a hill without using their hands.
    - Winners: Veterans
- Moving Pyramid: Both teams must form human pyramids with three people on the bottom, two in the middle and one on top. In pyramid formation, they must crawl through a course and retrieve a total on 16 flags on top of poles, every team member must be on top at some point during the challenge. The team with the most flags after 1 hour wins. In the event of a tie, the teams must race through the course in pyramid formation and the fastest team wins.
  - Winners: Veterans
- Sponge Worthy: Players divide themselves in three categories: Soakers, Transferers, and Collectors. Spongers collect water directly from the ocean with a sponge on their body, they then pass it on the Transferers with the help of a second sponge. Collectors must then squeeze the sponge on the Transferers without using their hands. The first team to collect a certain amount of water wins.
  - Winners: Rookies
- Body Painters: Wearing a speedo, the players must use their body to completely cover six canvases in different colors. The fastest team wins.
  - Winners: Veterans
- Rickshaw Races: Teams must complete a total of six laps and transfer all of their players in a rickshaw using only six drivers (three males and three females. The fastest team wins. (Note: Since the Veterans had two more players, they had to pick one male and one female to sit out from the "Rickshaw Races" challenge. The designated players would also be automatically safe from elimination. The Veterans selected Syrus and Montana.)
  - Winners: Rookies
- Team Strength: Teams selects two Pushers and one Driver to move a truck through a course. The back of the truck is then filled with cinder blocks and pushed back to the starting point. The fastest team wins.
  - Winners: Rookies
- Balancing Act: Working in pairs, teams must balance on two parallel ropes using another piece or rope held by the pairs. The team with the most players to successfully complete the course wins.
  - Winners: Rookies
- Buck-a-neer: Alternating in both positions, one team must balance on barrells connected to ropes without using hands while the other team tries to make them fall pulling the ropes. The team with the most players standing at the end of the challenge wins.
  - Winners: Rookies

=== Gauntlet games ===
- Name That Coconut: Players compete for the coconut with the name of the person that is the answer to a Real World/Road Rules trivia question. If the answer is wrong, the other player can answer freely. Best out of 9 win.
  - Played by: Derrick vs. Adam L., Kina vs. Cara, Derrick vs. Brad
- Beach Brawl: Players have to wrestle their opponent out of a ring. Best out of 5 win.
  - Played by: Alton vs. Danny, Derrick vs. Ace, Derrick vs. Syrus, Aneesa vs. Beth
- Capture the Flag: Players have to climb up a 20-foot (approx. 6 meters) rope net to get a flag.
  - Played by: Kina vs. Cameran, Alton vs. Adam K., Alton vs. Jeremy
- Reverse Tug of War: Players are tied to each other, facing opposite directions. The first to get to their flag wins.
  - Played by: Ruthie vs. Jisela, Beth vs. Ruthie, Beth vs. Montana, Timmy vs. Derrick
- Sticky Situation: Players had to stick balls to a board as their opponent tries to stop them. Best out of 5 win.
  - Played by: Kina vs. Jillian
- Knock Off: The wheel never landed on this challenge; the rules and gameplay of the challenge are unknown.

Other spaces on the wheel

- Spin Again: If a Gauntlet challenge was done 3 times, the next time there is a Gauntlet, that challenge is taken off the wheel for that instance and is replaced by Spin Again.
- Captain's Choice: The captain of the team going into the Gauntlet will choose which challenge he or she will be doing.
- Challenger's Choice: The person the team chose to oppose the captain in the Gauntlet will choose which challenge he or she will be doing.

== Game summary ==
| Episode | | Gender | Winners | Gauntlet contestants | | Gauntlet game | Gauntlet outcome | |
| # | Challenge | Gender | Winners | Captain | Voted in | Gauntlet game | Winner | Eliminated |
|---|---|---|---|---|---|---|---|---|
| 1 | Royal Rumble | Male | Alton | —N/a | | | | |
| 1 | Royal Rumble | Male | Adam L. | —N/a | | | | |
| 1 | Royal Rumble | Female | Jo | —N/a | | | | |
| 1 | Royal Rumble | Female | Ruthie | —N/a | | | | |
| 2 | Chock Full o' Coconuts | Male | Rookies | Adam L. | Derrick | Name That Coconut | Derrick | Adam L. |
| 3 | Team Builders | Female | Veterans | Kina | Cameran | Capture The Flag | —N/a | |
| 4 | Moving Pyramid | Male | Veterans | Alton | Danny | Beach Brawl | Alton | Danny |
| 5 | Sponge Worthy | Female | Rookies | Ruthie | Jisela | Reverse Tug of War | Ruthie | Jisela |
| 6 | Body Painters | Male | Veterans | Alton | Adam K. | Capture The Flag | Alton | Adam K. |
| 7 | Rickshaw Races | Female | Rookies | Ruthie | Beth | Reverse Tug of War | Beth | Ruthie |
| 8 | Team Strength | Male | Rookies | Derrick | Ace | Beach Brawl | Derrick | Ace |
| 9 | Balancing Act | Female | Rookies | Beth | Montana | Reverse Tug of War | Beth | Montana |
| 10 | Buck-a-neer | Male | Rookies | Derrick | Syrus | Beach Brawl | Derrick | Syrus |
| 11 | Pull Me | Female | Veterans | Kina | Cara | Name That Coconut | Kina | Cara |
| 12 | Spare Tires | Male | Veterans | Alton | Jeremy | Capture The Flag | Alton | Jeremy |
| 13 | Easy Does It | Female | Rookies | Beth | Aneesa | Beach Brawl | —N/a | |
| 14 | The Pit | Male | Rookies | Derrick | Brad | Name That Coconut | Derrick | Brad |
| 15 | Blind Trust | Female | Veterans | Kina | Jillian | Sticky Situation | Kina | Jillian |
| 16/17 | Piece by Piece | Male | Rookies | Derrick | Timmy | Reverse Tug of War | Timmy | Derrick |
| 17 | Bet Your Booty | —N/a | Rookies (Note: Only the first event was played, after the Veterans team bet 248 coins on the roti eating challenge. After a loss gave the Rookies 249 coins, the Veterans elected to forfeit, on the basis that Aneesa could not win against the three Rookies that were to race her in the relay event on horseback. (Episode recap) During the reunion show, Mark and Robin attributed the loss to a bout of food poisoning the night before.) | | | | | |

=== Elimination progress ===
| Contestants | Challenges | | | | | | | | | | | | | | | | |
| Contestants | 1 | 2 | 3 | 4 | 5 | 6 | 7 | 8 | 9 | 10 | 11 | 12 | 13 | 14 | 15 | 16/17 | Finale |
|---|---|---|---|---|---|---|---|---|---|---|---|---|---|---|---|---|---|
| Alton | WON | WIN | SAFE | ELIM | WIN | ELIM | WIN | WIN | WIN | WIN | SAFE | ELIM | WIN | WIN | SAFE | WIN | WINNER |
| Ibis | SAFE | WIN | SAFE | SAFE | WIN | SAFE | WIN | WIN | WIN | WIN | SAFE | SAFE | WIN | WIN | SAFE | WIN | WINNER |
| Jamie | SAFE | WIN | SAFE | SAFE | WIN | SAFE | WIN | WIN | WIN | WIN | SAFE | SAFE | WIN | WIN | SAFE | WIN | WINNER |
| Jodi | SAFE | WIN | SAFE | SAFE | WIN | SAFE | WIN | WIN | WIN | WIN | SAFE | SAFE | WIN | WIN | IMM | WIN | WINNER |
| Kina | SAFE | WIN | SAVE | SAFE | WIN | SAFE | WIN | WIN | WIN | WIN | ELIM | SAFE | WIN | WIN | ELIM | WIN | WINNER |
| Landon | SAFE | WIN | SAFE | SAFE | WIN | SAFE | WIN | WIN | WIN | WIN | SAFE | SAFE | WIN | WIN | SAFE | WIN | WINNER |
| MJ | SAFE | WIN | SAFE | SAFE | WIN | SAFE | WIN | WIN | WIN | WIN | SAFE | SAFE | WIN | WIN | SAFE | WIN | WINNER |
| Randy | SAFE | WIN | SAFE | SAFE | WIN | SAFE | WIN | WIN | WIN | WIN | SAFE | IMM | WIN | WIN | SAFE | WIN | WINNER |
| Susie | SAFE | WIN | SAFE | SAFE | WIN | SAFE | WIN | WIN | WIN | WIN | SAFE | SAFE | WIN | WIN | SAFE | WIN | WINNER |
| Aneesa | SAFE | SAFE | WIN | WIN | SAFE | WIN | SAFE | SAFE | SAFE | SAFE | WIN | WIN | SAVE | SAFE | WIN | SAFE | LOSER |
| David | SAFE | SAFE | WIN | WIN | SAFE | WIN | SAFE | SAFE | SAFE | SAFE | WIN | WIN | SAFE | SAFE | WIN | SAFE | LOSER |
| Julie | SAFE | SAFE | WIN | WIN | SAFE | WIN | SAFE | SAFE | SAFE | SAFE | WIN | WIN | SAFE | SAFE | WIN | SAFE | LOSER |
| Katie | SAFE | SAFE | WIN | WIN | SAFE | WIN | SAFE | SAFE | SAFE | SAFE | WIN | WIN | SAFE | SAFE | WIN | SAFE | LOSER |
| Mark | SAFE | SAFE | WIN | WIN | SAFE | WIN | SAFE | SAFE | SAFE | SAFE | WIN | WIN | SAFE | SAFE | WIN | SAFE | LOSER |
| Robin | SAFE | SAFE | WIN | WIN | SAFE | WIN | SAFE | SAFE | SAFE | SAFE | WIN | WIN | SAFE | SAFE | WIN | SAFE | LOSER |
| Timmy | SAFE | SAFE | WIN | WIN | SAFE | WIN | SAFE | SAFE | SAFE | SAFE | WIN | WIN | SAFE | SAFE | WIN | ELIM | LOSER |
| Derrick | SAFE | ELIM | WIN | WIN | SAFE | WIN | SAFE | ELIM | SAFE | ELIM | WIN | WIN | SAFE | ELIM | WIN | OUT | |
| Jillian | SAFE | WIN | SAFE | SAFE | WIN | SAFE | WIN | WIN | WIN | WIN | SAFE | SAFE | WIN | WIN | OUT | | |
| Brad | SAFE | SAFE | WIN | WIN | SAFE | WIN | SAFE | SAFE | SAFE | SAFE | WIN | WIN | SAFE | OUT | | | |
| Beth | SAFE | SAFE | WIN | WIN | SAFE | WIN | ELIM | SAFE | ELIM | SAFE | WIN | WIN | QUIT | | | | |
| Jeremy | SAFE | WIN | SAFE | SAFE | WIN | SAFE | WIN | WIN | WIN | WIN | SAFE | OUT | | | | | |
| Cara | SAFE | WIN | SAFE | SAFE | WIN | SAFE | WIN | WIN | WIN | WIN | OUT | | | | | | |
| Syrus | SAFE | SAFE | WIN | WIN | SAFE | WIN | SAFE | SAFE | SAFE | OUT | | | | | | | |
| Montana | SAFE | SAFE | WIN | WIN | SAFE | WIN | IMM | SAFE | OUT | | | | | | | | |
| Ace | SAFE | SAFE | WIN | WIN | SAFE | WIN | SAFE | OUT | | | | | | | | | |
| Ruthie | WON | SAFE | WIN | WIN | ELIM | WIN | OUT | | | | | | | | | | |
| Adam K. | SAFE | WIN | SAFE | SAFE | WIN | OUT | | | | | | | | | | | |
| Jisela | SAFE | SAFE | WIN | WIN | OUT | | | | | | | | | | | | |
| Danny | SAFE | WIN | SAFE | OUT | | | | | | | | | | | | | |
| Cameran | SAFE | WIN | QUIT | | | | | | | | | | | | | | |
| Adam L. | WON | OUT | | | | | | | | | | | | | | | |
| Jo | WON | QUIT | | | | | | | | | | | | | | | |

Teams
The contestant is on the Rookies team
The contestant is on the Veterans team
Competition
The contestant's team won by default after the other team forfeited
The contestant's team forfeited after determining they weren't going to win
The contestant's team won the challenge and was safe
The contestant won the Captain's challenge and was named the team captain
The contestant sat out of the challenge and was exempt from the Gauntlet
The contestant won the Gauntlet
The contestant was selected for the Gauntlet, but did not have to compete
The contestant lost the Gauntlet and was eliminated
The contestant withdrew from the competition

=== Final ===
The final challenge, "Bet Your Booty" consisted of three games, roti eating, a memory challenge, and a relay race on horseback, to place bets on. Each team has 250 gold doubloons to bet, and each contestant is eligible to compete in only one event. The Veterans bet and lost the majority of their doubloons on the first round and afterwards gave up letting the Rookies win the $240,000 final prize to split.

| Rookies | Event | Veterans |
|---|---|---|
| Ibis; Jodi; Jamie; Randy (1 doubloon) | Roti Eating | Mark; Timmy; Robin; Julie; David (248 doubloons) |
| Susie; Kina (1 doubloon) | Pirate Memory | Katie (1 doubloon) |
| MJ; Landon; Alton (248 doubloons) | Sand Sprint | Aneesa (1 doubloon) |

== Episodes ==
| No. overall | No. in season | Title | Original release date |
|---|---|---|---|
| 139 | 1 | "Throwing Down the Gauntlet" | December 5, 2005 |
| 140 | 2 | "Derrick Steps It Up" | December 12, 2005 |
| 141 | 3 | "We Can Work It Out" | December 19, 2005 |
| 142 | 4 | "The $10,000 Pyramid" | December 26, 2005 |
| 143 | 5 | "Sloppy Seconds" | January 2, 2006 |
| 144 | 6 | "Watching Paint Dry" | January 9, 2006 |
| 145 | 7 | "The Heat Is On" | January 16, 2006 |
| 146 | 8 | "Rookie Movies" | January 23, 2006 |
| 147 | 9 | "Walking the Line" | January 30, 2006 |
| 148 | 10 | "Bucked" | February 6, 2006 |
| 149 | 11 | "Victory At Last" | February 13, 2006 |
| 150 | 12 | "Tire Me Up, Tire Me Down" | February 20, 2006 |
| 151 | 13 | "Mac-Beth" | February 27, 2006 |
| 152 | 14 | "The Good, the Brad, and the Ugly" | March 6, 2006 |
| 153 | 15 | "Blind Panic" | March 13, 2006 |
| 154 | 16 | "Last Men Standing" | March 20, 2006 |
| 155 | 17 | "Don't Bet On It" | March 27, 2006 |

=== Reunion special ===
The reunion special, Shark Infested Waters: Gauntlet II Reunion, aired after the season finale on March 27, 2006 and was hosted by Susie Castillo.

== Teams/Pairs ==
Chock Full of Coconuts (Ep. 2)
| Ace & Derrick | Adam K. & Kina |
| Adam L. & Timmy | Alton & Ibis |
| Aneesa & Jisela | Danny & Susie |
| Beth & Julie | Cara & Randy |
| Brad & David | Jamie & Jeremy |
| Katie & Ruthie | Jodi & MJ |
| Montana & Robin | Landon & Jillian |

Balancing Act (Ep. 9)
| Mark & Syrus | Alton & Landon |
| Derrick & Katie | Jillian & Kina |
| Julie & Robin | Cara & Susie |
| Aneesa & Montana | Jamie & Jeremy |
| Brad & David | MJ & Randy |
| Beth & Timmy | Ibis & Jodi |

Easy Does It (Ep. 13)
| David & Mark | Alton & Landon |
| Katie & Robin | Jamie & Jodi |
| Beth & Derrick | Jillian & Kina |
| Aneesa & Julie | Ibis & Susie |
| Brad & Timmy | MJ & Randy |
