= Real World/Road Rules Challenge: The Gauntlet III =

15th season of the reality television series

The Gauntlet III
- Season 15
- Presented by: T. J. Lavin
- No. of contestants: 33
- Winners: Frank Roessler; Jillian Zoboroski; Johanna Botta; Nehemiah Clark; Rachel Moyal; Tori Hall
- Location: Puerto Vallarta, Mexico
- Opening Theme: "15 Minutes" performed by Wired All Wrong
- No. of episodes: 10

Release
- Original network: MTV
- Original release: January 23 – March 26, 2008

Season chronology
- ← Previous; The Inferno 3 Next → The Island

Real World/Road Rules Challenge: The Gauntlet III is the 15th season of the MTV reality game show, The Challenge (at the time known as Real World/Road Rules Challenge).

Being the third in The Gauntlet series, The Gauntlet III marked the show's 2nd trilogy (after The Inferno), continuing on from The Gauntlet and The Gauntlet 2. The season was filmed in Riviera Nayarita, Mexico, with cast members from The Real World, Road Rules and Real World/Road Rules Challenge: Fresh Meat competing. This season was in the format of two teams: Veterans vs. Rookies, with a format similar to The Gauntlet 2. The contestants on the Veterans team had been on at least two prior seasons of the Challenge, and the contestants on the Rookies team had been on fewer than two prior seasons.

== Format ==
The competition consists of a series of team challenges (sometimes called "missions") with an elimination challenge, known as the "Gauntlet", following each of the team challenges except the final. Each team challenge puts the team of Veterans against the team of Rookies. Prior to the challenge, it is announced whether males or females will compete in the Gauntlet following the challenge.

After each team challenge, on a male Gauntlet day, the winning team selects a male member of the losing team to protect from the Gauntlet and another male member to send into the Gauntlet. The losing team then selects one of its own males to go against the person picked by the winners. On a female Gauntlet day, the players protected and sent into the Gauntlet are females.

After the two players for the Gauntlet are picked, a wheel is spun to determine which challenge is going to be played in the Gauntlet. The loser of the Gauntlet is eliminated from the game.

In this season, minor prizes are awarded after each challenge to the team members that were not vulnerable to elimination in the following Gauntlet; i.e. on challenges before male Gauntlets, prizes are awarded to female members of the winning team, and vice versa. The grand prize is $300,000, which is split among the remaining members of the team that wins the final challenge.

- No player can be saved from the Gauntlet on two consecutive opportunities.
- No Gauntlet elimination is played twice consecutively.
- This season differs from The Gauntlet 2 in that the teams do not have captains.
- This season differs from most prior two-team Challenges in that there are no bank accounts; prize money is only given for the final challenge.

== Contestants ==
Veterans Team
Player	Original season	Finish
Adam King	The Real World: Paris	Runner-up
Brad Fiorenza	The Real World: San Diego	Runner-up
Chris "CT" Tamburello	The Real World: Paris	Runner-up
Diem Brown	Real World/Road Rules Challenge: Fresh Meat	Runner-up
Eric Banks	Real World/Road Rules Challenge: Fresh Meat	Runner-up
Evan Starkman	Real World/Road Rules Challenge: Fresh Meat	Runner-up
Evelyn Smith	Real World/Road Rules Challenge: Fresh Meat	Runner-up
Kenny Santucci	Real World/Road Rules Challenge: Fresh Meat	Runner-up
Paula Meronek	The Real World: Key West	Runner-up
Robin Hibbard	The Real World: San Diego	Runner-up
Danny Jamieson	The Real World: Austin	Episode 9
Katie Doyle	Road Rules: The Quest	Episode 8
Casey Cooper	Real World/Road Rules Challenge: Fresh Meat	Episode 7
Coral Smith	The Real World: Back to New York	Episode 7 (Note: Following the "Over The Edge" challenge in Episode 7, Coral withdrew from the game due to her outcast status on the team, being abandoned by former friend and ally Evan, and being voted into the Gauntlet against Evelyn. Casey volunteered to take Coral's place and was eliminated by Evelyn.)
Beth Stolarczyk	The Real World: Los Angeles	Episode 5
Johnny Devenanzio	The Real World: Key West	Episode 3

Rookies Team
Player	Original season	Finish
Frank Roessler	The Real World: Las Vegas	Winner
Jillian Zoboroski	Road Rules: X-Treme	Winner
Johanna Botta	The Real World: Austin	Winner
Nehemiah Clark	The Real World: Austin	Winner
Rachel Moyal	The Real World: Austin	Winner
Tori Hall	Road Rules 2007: Viewers' Revenge	Winner
Ryan Kehoe	Real World/Road Rules Challenge: Fresh Meat	Episode 7
MJ Garrett (Note: Tyrie withdrew from the game at the end of Episode 3 due to a family emergency back home. MJ was brought in as a replacement prior to the "Push It" challenge in Episode 4.)	The Real World: Philadelphia	Episode 6
Melinda Stolp	The Real World: Austin	Episode 6
Derek McCray	Road Rules 2007: Viewers' Revenge	Episode 5
Zach Mann	The Real World: Key West	Episode 4
Janelle Casanave	The Real World: Key West	Episode 4
Tyrie Ballard	The Real World: Denver	Episode 3
Brooke LaBarbera	The Real World: Denver	Episode 3
Tyler Duckworth	The Real World: Key West	Episode 2
Angel Turlington	Road Rules 2007: Viewers' Revenge	Episode 2
Alex Smith	The Real World: Denver	Episode 1

== Gameplay ==
=== Challenge games ===
- Piñata Pit: After T. J. Lavin strikes a Mexican piñata hanging over a mud pit, orange and green colored balls drop into the pit, and players from each team have to retrieve their designated colored balls—orange for the men, green for the women—from one side of the pit to the other. The challenge is played in multiple rounds, and in each round, there are fewer balls than there are players. A player is eliminated if he/she exits the pit at the end of a round without a ball. The process continues until the last player of each gender advances the last ball to the end of the pit. If a tie occurs with one gender per team winning the final round, a tiebreaker round will be held to determine which team wins the challenge and earns immunity from the Gauntlet.
  - Winner: Veterans
- Screw You: Played in two-player pairs, teams have to advance each player through a pair of obstacle courses and unscrew an oversize wing nut at the end of the first two obstacles. Once each pair advances to a stairway at the third obstacle, the next pair repeats the process, and the process continues until each pair crosses the finish line. (Note: Since the Rookies were short one male player, one guy has to go through the obstacle course twice.) The first team to advance all of their players through the obstacle course wins.
  - Winner: Veterans
- Roped In: Each team must designate one male player to stand on a rope swing that has 12 ropes attached to wooden poles. Each pole is spread out with a circumference of 20 feet, and six of the wooden poles have puzzle pieces in various shapes on the sides, while the other six poles have slots matching each puzzle piece. Each team must pull and swing the ropes that will guide their designated male player to a pole, and retrieve the wooden puzzle piece that he chooses to the pole with the matching slot. The first team to match all pieces in the proper slots wins.
  - Winner: Veterans
- Wring Out: A pair of clothes lines are hanging on a beach with designated colored buckets and white clothing. Teams must designate which players will put on the clothing, run into the ocean, and soak themselves with as much water as possible, as well as which players will load the soaked clothing (after the "soakers" undress), transfer to their teammates, and wring out the water in their designated colored bucket on the other side of the clothes line. The process continues until the first team to fill up their water bucket to a fill line wins.
  - Winner: Veterans
- Blind Man's Maze: Teams must advance each player one-by-one through an obstacle course that has an observation deck in the center. One player from each team is designated as the "eyes" of the team and stands atop the deck, and will try to guide their blindfolded teammates through the maze, over and under ropes, wooden logs and tires in the sand. Once each player advances to the end, he/she must ring a bell, then tag the next teammate, and the process continues until the first team to advance each player through the obstacle course wins.
  - Winner: Rookies
- Push It: Teams have to build a road along an obstacle course on the beach, by using 12 wooden planks underneath two cars — one car for each team, and each team has to designate one player to steer the car, while the remainder of the team pushes the car on the wooden planks, and move the wooden planks to the front in order to push the car through the obstacle course. The first team to push their car through the course and to the finish line wins.
  - Winner: Veterans
- Man Overboard: Teams have to advance on a sled, from one side of a horizontal 120-foot track to another, that is suspended 25 feet above water. A maximum of five players can sit on the sled, and each player can only compete once. The challenge is played in three heats per team, with a heat defined as making it from one end of the track to the other. When T. J. Lavin sounds the horn, players on the sled have to use a rope to pull themselves from one side of the track to the other, have one player jump 25 feet into the water at the end of the track, and repeating the process until the last player on the sled reaches the end of a track, and jumps into the water, which will stop the team time. The team with the fastest average time per heat wins. (Note: Melinda did not participate in this challenge, after she suffered a mild concussion in the previous challenge, "Push It.")
  - Winner: Veterans
- Assembly Required: Each team will disassemble a 20-foot tall, 900-square foot pyramid, which is a replica of El Castillo, Chichen Itza, and transport the pieces to another location and reassemble the pieces again on their designated loading zone. The team that completes their pyramid wins.
  - Winner: Rookies
- Walk The Plank: Players from each team have to advance from one end of a narrow plank to the other that is suspended 20 feet above water, while five players from the opposing team and same gender that are sitting on a nearby platform will try to knock them off the bridge by using swinging medicine balls, two balls per player. A player trying to advance on the plank is disqualified if he/she touches the swinging medicine ball with their hands. The challenge is played in separate male and female heats — two per gender, and the team that advances the most players from one end of the plank to the other wins.
  - Winner: Veterans
- Pole Push: A pole is situated in the middle of a large circle in the sand, and players from each team must grab onto the pole on both sides, and push the opposing team out of the circle until each player from the opposing team is out of the circle. The challenge is played in separate male and female heats, and if a tie occurs with each team winning one heat, a tiebreaker would be held with one girl per team trying to push each other out of the circle. The team that pushes their opponent out of the circle twice wins.
  - Winner: Veterans
- I Dig You: A series of half-buried coffins are spread out on the beach — two for each team, and all but one player from each team will be buried in their designated coffins, two feet deep in the sand, while each team will designate one player to dig his/her teammates out of their coffins. Next to each coffin, there is a sign containing three true/false questions about each player, and if that player solves each question correctly, he/she can rescue his/her teammate out of the coffin, however, if one answer is incorrect, the player designated as the digger has to move on the next coffin. The first team to rescue all of their teammates out of their coffins wins.
  - Winner: Veterans
- Over The Edge: A pair of planks are hanging from the top of a 25-story building. A 10-foot cable ladder, with a flag at the bottom, is attached to the end of each plank. When T. J. Lavin sounds the horn, players from each team have to make their way onto the planks and down the ladder, retrieve their team flag, then make their way back up the ladder and touch a truss at the start of the plank, which will stop a team time. If a player falls off the ladder or refuses to compete (due to a fear of heights), a 15-minute penalty will be added to the slowest time. The team with the fastest average time wins.
  - Winner: Rookies
- Mexican Blanket: Players from each team are wrapped up in Mexican blankets on opposite sides of a course on the beach. The goal is for each team is for each player to roll toward the opponent's side of the course, by passing each other and blocking opposing players from advancing. The team that advances all of their players across the finish line at the opposite side of the course wins.
  - Winner: Veterans
- Chill Out: Players from each team have to submerge themselves in a large tub of ice water, one player at a time, for at least five seconds. The game is played in multiple rounds — five minutes per round, and a player is eliminated if he/she decides that the freezing temperatures become too much for him/her to handle, or requires the assistance of a medic. A team time is stopped once each player has exited the ice tub. The team that can withstand the freezing ice water for the longest time wins, with the women from the winning team automatically in the final challenge.
  - Winner: Rookies
- Well-Balanced: Each team has to balance on two 25-foot circular platforms — one platform for each team — by dispersing the weight of each player. Once each team has perfectly leveled their platform, they will have 10 seconds to keep their platform level, with the first team to accomplish this twice not only winning the challenge, but also with the men from the winning team automatically competing in the final challenge.
  - Winner: Rookies

=== Gauntlet games ===
In the Gauntlet, the game played is determined by spinning a wheel. The wheel contains six sections, one for each Gauntlet game and one for 'spin again'. The game that was played in the previous Gauntlet is replaced by another 'spin again' section, and therefore, no Gauntlet game can be played twice in a row.

- Force Field: The two competitors are joined by a rope that goes over the top of them by a pulley system. For one player to move forward he has to drag the other backwards. Each competitor starts at their line and at the start of the Gauntlet they both race to cross their opponents line. First one to do this wins.
  - Played by: Nehemiah vs. Alex, Frank vs. Tyler
- Ram It Home: The two competitors start with a wall at their back and a sled that hangs on an overhead track in front of them. They must then use the sled to push each other. The first player to push their opponent all the way back into their own wall wins the Gauntlet.
  - Played by: Jillian vs. Angel, Nehemiah vs. Ryan
- Ball Brawl: The two competitors have to return footballs, which are aligned in a longitudinal pattern, back the starting point. Beginning with the nearest ball, the competitors both race at the same time to get the ball, and they are allowed to tackle the person and strip the ball. The five balls are each contested separately (not continuously). The first three balls, black, are worth 1 point. The last two balls are white, and worth two points each. The first person to get four points wins.
  - Played by: Jillian vs. Brooke, Jillian vs. Janelle, Coral vs. Beth, Tori vs. Melinda, Evelyn vs. Casey, Adam vs. Danny
- Sliders: The two competitors each have to solve a slide puzzle at the same time. They are 16 space puzzle boards and each of them has the same design, and are given a picture of what the final design should look like. One of them is blue, the other red. Their teammates (and the opposing team) are allowed to watch and help them solve it.
  - Played by: Evan vs. Johnny, Frank vs. Zach, Ryan vs. Derek, Paula vs. Katie
- Ankle Breaker: The two competitors are tied together by one ankle. They have to pull their opponent through the sand until they reach a rope they can use to reach the finish line.
  - Played by: MJ vs. Frank

=== Army Strong final challenge ===
Each team starts out on a yacht half a mile off the Mexican Riviera, with one key handed to them by T. J. Levin. Every player has to jump off the yacht, and swim to the shore, in which the remainder of the challenge will be a footrace, containing checkpoints that are reminiscent of the aforementioned challenge games. T. J. Lavin explains to each team that all team members must cross the finish line to win the Army Strong Final Challenge. Each checkpoint contains a key that a team will need in order to obtain instructions for further checkpoints, and after the first checkpoint, teammates must be connected together by chains for the remainder of the race unless they are instructed otherwise. The first checkpoint is a combination of the "Chill Out" and "Assembly Required" games, in which players from each team must jump into a large ice tub in order to retrieve 20 pieces of a puzzle that are located at the bottom of the ice tub. Once a team has solved their puzzle, they can obtain another key, and then race to the next checkpoint, which is based on the "Screw You" challenge. Each team has to unscrew an oversize wing nut until it has been removed off a track, which contains the key to the next checkpoint, which is based on the "Sliders" elimination game. Note: Prior to this checkpoint, Eric collapsed and needed medical assistance, and the Veterans team became disqualified when he was removed from the final challenge. The final two checkpoints are based on the "Man Overboard" and "I Dig You" games. At the "I Dig You" checkpoint, each team must dig deep through the sand in order to retrieve a treasure chest that contains a flag. After digging through the sand, the Veterans raise their flag ahead of the Rookies, however T. J. Lavin does not blow horn, because the Veterans had already been disqualified. Once the Rookies raise their team flag, they are declared the winning team.

- Winners: Rookies (win $300,000 — $50,000 for each player)

== Game summary ==
Episode		Gender	Winners	Protected	Gauntlet contestants		Gauntlet game	Gauntlet outcome	
#	Challenge	Gender	Winners	Protected	Winners' Pick	Losers' Pick	Gauntlet game	Winner	Eliminated
1	Tug of War (Note: Upon beginning game, an opening Tug of War challenge was held. This challenge was for the reward of superior accommodations at the house. This challenge did not determine any Gauntlet nominees.)	—N/a	Veterans	—N/a					
1	Pinata Pit	Male	Veterans	Ryan	Nehemiah	Alex	Force Field	Nehemiah	Alex
2	Screw You (Note: Due to the Rookies having one less male player than the Veterans, Derek was selected and competed twice in the "Screw You" challenge.)	Female	Veterans	Brooke	Jillian	Angel	Ram It Home	Jillian	Angel
2	Roped In	Male	Veterans	Tyrie	Tyler	Frank	Force Field	Frank	Tyler
3	Wring Out	Female	Veterans	Tori	Jillian	Brooke	Ball Brawl	Jillian	Brooke
3	Blind Man's Maze	Male	Rookies	Adam	Evan	Johnny	Sliders	Evan	Johnny
4	Push It	Female	Veterans	Johanna	Janelle	Jillian	Ball Brawl	Jillian	Janelle
4	Man Overboard	Male	Veterans	Ryan	Frank	Zach	Sliders	Frank	Zach
5 (Note: In Episode 5, three female Gauntlets into the game, it is mentioned that there are five female Gauntlets left. At the end, only four of those were played, likely due to Coral's departure in Episode 7.)	Assembly Required	Female	Rookies	Casey	Coral	Beth	Ball Brawl	Coral	Beth
5	Walk The Plank	Male	Veterans	MJ	Derek	Ryan	Sliders	Ryan	Derek
6	Pole Push	Female	Veterans	Rachel	Melinda	Tori	Ball Brawl	Tori	Melinda
6	I Dig You	Male	Veterans	Ryan	Frank	MJ	Ankle Breaker	Frank	MJ
7	Over The Edge	Female	Rookies	Katie	Evelyn	Casey	Ball Brawl	Evelyn	Casey
7	Mexican Blanket	Male	Veterans	Frank (Note: The Rookies only had three male players who were vulnerable for the Gauntlet — Frank, Nehemiah, and Ryan. The Veterans were prohibited from protecting Ryan from the Gauntlet (see the rules above), so they protected Frank, forcing Nehemiah and Ryan to face each other in the Gauntlet.)	Nehemiah vs. Ryan		Ram It Home	Nehemiah	Ryan
8/9	Chill Out	Female	Rookies	Diem	Paula	Katie	Sliders	Paula	Katie
8/9	Well-Balanced	Male	Rookies	Eric	Adam	Danny	Ball Brawl	Adam	Danny
9	Army Strong	—N/a	Rookies						

=== Elimination progress ===
Contestants	Episodes																
Contestants	1		2		3		4		5		6		7		8/9		Finale (Note: The Veterans beat out the Rookies in the final challenge, but were disqualified after Eric collapsed and was sent to the hospital midway through the final race. The rules stated that a team would only win the "Army Strong" final challenge if each player was present at the end. Therefore, the Rookies won the "Army Strong" final challenge by default.)
Frank	LOSE	SAFE	SAFE	ELIM	SAFE	WIN	SAFE	ELIM	WIN	SAFE	SAFE	ELIM	WIN	SAVE	WIN	WIN	WINNER
Jillian	LOSE	SAFE	ELIM	SAFE	ELIM	WIN	ELIM	SAFE	WIN	SAFE	SAFE	SAFE	WIN	SAFE	WIN	WIN	WINNER
Johanna	LOSE	SAFE	SAFE	SAFE	SAFE	WIN	SAVE	SAFE	WIN	SAFE	SAFE	SAFE	WIN	SAFE	WIN	WIN	WINNER
Nehemiah	LOSE	ELIM	SAFE	SAFE	SAFE	WIN	SAFE	SAFE	WIN	SAFE	SAFE	SAFE	WIN	ELIM	WIN	WIN	WINNER
Rachel	LOSE	SAFE	SAFE	SAFE	SAFE	WIN	SAFE	SAFE	WIN	SAFE	SAVE	SAFE	WIN	SAFE	WIN	WIN	WINNER
Tori	LOSE	SAFE	SAFE	SAFE	SAVE	WIN	SAFE	SAFE	WIN	SAFE	ELIM	SAFE	WIN	SAFE	WIN	WIN	WINNER
Adam	WON	WIN	WIN	WIN	WIN	SAVE	WIN	WIN	SAFE	WIN	WIN	WIN	SAFE	WIN	SAFE	ELIM	LOSER
Brad	WON	WIN	WIN	WIN	WIN	SAFE	WIN	WIN	SAFE	WIN	WIN	WIN	SAFE	WIN	SAFE	SAFE	LOSER
CT	WON	WIN	WIN	WIN	WIN	SAFE	WIN	WIN	SAFE	WIN	WIN	WIN	SAFE	WIN	SAFE	SAFE	LOSER
Diem	WON	WIN	WIN	WIN	WIN	SAFE	WIN	WIN	SAFE	WIN	WIN	WIN	SAFE	WIN	SAVE	SAFE	LOSER
Evan	WON	WIN	WIN	WIN	WIN	ELIM	WIN	WIN	SAFE	WIN	WIN	WIN	SAFE	WIN	SAFE	SAFE	LOSER
Evelyn	WON	WIN	WIN	WIN	WIN	SAFE	WIN	WIN	SAFE	WIN	WIN	WIN	ELIM	WIN	SAFE	SAFE	LOSER
Kenny	WON	WIN	WIN	WIN	WIN	SAFE	WIN	WIN	SAFE	WIN	WIN	WIN	SAFE	WIN	SAFE	SAFE	LOSER
Paula	WON	WIN	WIN	WIN	WIN	SAFE	WIN	WIN	SAFE	WIN	WIN	WIN	SAFE	WIN	ELIM	SAFE	LOSER
Robin	WON	WIN	WIN	WIN	WIN	SAFE	WIN	WIN	SAFE	WIN	WIN	WIN	SAFE	WIN	SAFE	SAFE	LOSER
Eric	WON	WIN	WIN	WIN	WIN	SAFE	WIN	WIN	SAFE	WIN	WIN	WIN	SAFE	WIN	SAFE	SAVE	MED
Danny	WON	WIN	WIN	WIN	WIN	SAFE	WIN	WIN	SAFE	WIN	WIN	WIN	SAFE	WIN	SAFE	OUT	
Katie	WON	WIN	WIN	WIN	WIN	SAFE	WIN	WIN	SAFE	WIN	WIN	WIN	SAVE	WIN	OUT		
Ryan	LOSE	SAVE	SAFE	SAFE	SAFE	WIN	SAFE	SAVE	WIN	ELIM	SAFE	SAVE	WIN	OUT			
Casey	WON	WIN	WIN	WIN	WIN	SAFE	WIN	WIN	SAVE	WIN	WIN	WIN	OUT				
Coral	WON	WIN	WIN	WIN	WIN	SAFE	WIN	WIN	ELIM	WIN	WIN	WIN	QUIT				
MJ	—N/a						SAFE	SAFE	WIN	SAVE	SAFE	OUT					
Melinda	LOSE	SAFE	SAFE	SAFE	SAFE	WIN	SAFE	SAFE	WIN	SAFE	OUT						
Derek	LOSE	SAFE	SAFE	SAFE	SAFE	WIN	SAFE	SAFE	WIN	OUT							
Beth	WON	WIN	WIN	WIN	WIN	SAFE	WIN	WIN	OUT								
Zach	LOSE	SAFE	SAFE	SAFE	SAFE	WIN	SAFE	OUT									
Janelle	LOSE	SAFE	SAFE	SAFE	SAFE	WIN	OUT										
Tyrie	LOSE	SAFE	SAFE	SAVE	SAFE	QUIT											
Johnny	WON	WIN	WIN	WIN	WIN	OUT											
Brooke	LOSE	SAFE	SAVE	SAFE	OUT												
Tyler	LOSE	SAFE	SAFE	OUT													
Angel	LOSE	SAFE	OUT														
Alex	LOSE	OUT															

Teams
The contestant is on the Rookies team
The contestant is on the Veterans team
Competition
The contestant's team won the final challenge by default
The contestant's team finished first in the final challenge, but was disqualified due to a missing team member
The contestant's team won the mission
The contestant's team won the first mission and received the good house
The contestant's team lost the first mission and received the bad house
The contestant was protected from the Gauntlet by the winning team
The contestant won the Gauntlet
The contestant lost the Gauntlet and was eliminated
The contestant withdrew from the competition
The contestant was removed from the competition due to medical reasons

== Partners ==
Screw You
Kenny & Evelyn	Derek & Nehemiah
CT & Diem	Frank & Tyrie
Brad & Robin	Ryan & Tyler
Johnny & Paula	Janelle & Tori
Danny & Beth	Johanna & Melinda
Evan & Coral	Jillian & Rachel
Eric & Katie	Zach & Brooke
Adam & Casey	Derek & Angel

== Episodes ==
No. overall	No. in season	Title	Original release date
204	1	"Viva Mexico"	January 23, 2008
205	2	"It's Personal"	January 30, 2008
206	3	"Less Is More"	February 6, 2008
207	4	"It's Not Fair"	February 13, 2008
208	5	"Match-Up of the Century"	February 20, 2008
209	6	"All Alone"	February 27, 2008
210	7	"What Goes Around"	March 5, 2008
211	8	"Cold Blooded"	March 12, 2008
212	9	"The Finale"	March 19, 2008

=== Reunion special ===
Trim the Fat: The Gauntlet III Reunion was hosted by Lyndsey Rodrigues, filmed in New York, and premiered March 26, 2008. The most common topics of discussion are the various romances, backstabbing and deceit amongst the cast members. Frank and Jillian are still a couple and living together. Tori and Brad are together, though living apart. Johanna and Wes broke up. Paula and Derek decided to remain friends and Casey and Johnny are not a couple, nor are Evelyn and Brooke, and Evelyn is told that Brooke is dating her ex-girlfriend. CT and Diem are not present, Katie reveals they have broken up. Coral heavily criticized Evelyn for betraying the women, Evelyn says she didn't care if the men threw challenges to get rid of them. Both Rachel and Tori say that their conflicts with Frank were in the past, and Evan and Kenny praised Frank for digging for hours to retrieve the winning chest of money in the final challenge, saying Frank should have gotten an extra cut of the final prize. Brad stated they wanted Beth out because she might have thrown missions. Johanna comments about Melinda's false belief that she was betrayed over the Gauntlet deliberations. Eric's failure in the final challenge is discussed, and it is revealed that only Brad, Coral, and Katie are still friends with him. Footage from the upcoming The Real World: Hollywood season is shown.

== Music from The Gauntlet III ==
=== Challenge 15: Army Strong ===
- "15 Minutes" - Wired All Wrong (Theme song)
- "Ten Thousand Strong" - Iced Earth
- "Life is Beautiful" - SIXX:A.M.
- "Freakum Dress" - Beyoncé Knowles
- "Running Up That Hill" - Placebo
- "Take This to Heart" - Mayday Parade
- "Wow, I Can Get Sexual Too" - Say Anything
- "When I Get Home, You're So Dead" - Mayday Parade
- "Shut Up and Drive" - Rihanna
- "Would You Love a Monsterman?" - Lordi
- "Going Through Changes" - Army of Me
- "Scream Out Loud" - Baltimore
- "Supermassive Black Hole" - Muse
- "Lose It" - Cartel (Last song played, as Vets raise their flag, but do not win the competition)
- "Maniac (R.O.D.)" - Four Year Strong

Source for this section:
