= Real World/Road Rules Challenge: The Island =

16th season of the reality television series

The Island
- Season 16
- Presented by: T. J. Lavin
- No. of contestants: 20
- Winners: Derrick Kosinski; Evelyn Smith; Johnny Devenanzio; Kenny Santucci
- Location: Boca del Drago, Panama
- Opening Theme: "Devour" by Shinedown
- No. of episodes: 9

Release
- Original network: MTV
- Original release: September 10 – November 5, 2008

Season chronology
- ← Previous; The Gauntlet III Next → The Duel II

Real World/Road Rules Challenge: The Island is the 16th season of the MTV reality game show, The Challenge (at the time known as Real World/Road Rules Challenge).

The season featured cast members from The Real World, Road Rules and Real World/Road Rules Challenge: Fresh Meat "stranded" on an island off the coast of Panama, where they competed for a buried treasure chest filled with $300,000 in gold. Unlike in previous seasons, the cast was not housed in a luxurious dwelling, but was "forced" to improvise and "work" for the basic necessities of food and shelter, as on the TV series Survivor. There were no predetermined teams. Instead, the cast members had to forge their own alliances. Of the twenty cast members, there were only four winners. The Island premiered on September 10, 2008, and concluded on October 29, 2008.

== Format ==
The contestants are "stranded" on an island, the objective of the challenge is to construct two boats that they are eventually going to be used to reach a nearby island where the buried treasure of $300,000 is hidden. Once the boats are complete, only eight key-holders are allowed to board and compete in a 4-on-4 race to get to the buried treasure.

At the beginning of each episode, materials to build the boats, food, information about the boats and some luxury are air-dropped, it's up to the contestants to decide how the food is divided and to assemble the pieces and make sure their vessels are seaworthy.

They then have to choose 3 contestants to go into a face-off. In order to get one of the keys to be in the final race and have a shot for the money, contestants must risk it all in this three-way face-offs. After each face-off, the winner receives a key, the losers get a chance to speak in front of every contestant as should why they should stay in the island, the contestants (except for the winner of the face-off) vote on who should leave the island. In the case of a tie, the winner of the face-off decides who leaves and who stays.

However, the rules of the challenge are given to the competitors as the challenge advances, and the way to get the keys can change at any moment. At the end of the season, the eight key-holders have to divide themselves into two teams of four, build their boats and race to the island where the buried treasure of $300,000 is hidden. The final eliminated contestant can help.

== Contestants ==
Contestants	Original season	Finish
Derrick Kosinski	Road Rules: X-Treme	Winner
Evelyn Smith	Real World/Road Rules Challenge: Fresh Meat	Winner
Johnny Devenanzio	The Real World: Key West	Winner
Kenny Santucci	Real World/Road Rules Challenge: Fresh Meat	Winner
Jenn Grijalva	The Real World: Denver	Runner-up
Paula Meronek	The Real World: Key West	Runner-up
Robin Hibbard	The Real World: San Diego	Runner-up
Ryan Kehoe	Real World/Road Rules Challenge: Fresh Meat	Runner-up
Dunbar Merrill	The Real World: Sydney	Episode 8
Johanna Botta	The Real World: Austin	Episode 8
KellyAnne Judd	The Real World: Sydney	Episode 8
Dan Walsh	Road Rules 2007: Viewers' Revenge	Episode 8
Colie Edison	The Real World: Denver	Episode 7
Cohutta Grindstaff	The Real World: Sydney	Episode 6
Tyrie Ballard	The Real World: Denver	Episode 5
Ashli Robson	The Real World: Sydney	Episode 4
Rachel Robinson	Road Rules: Campus Crawl	Episode 3
Abram Boise	Road Rules: South Pacific	Episode 2
Dave Malinosky	The Real World: Hollywood	Episode 2 (Note: Dave quit in episode 2, being fed up with the living conditions.)
Tonya Cooley	The Real World: Chicago	Episode 1

== Face-offs ==
- Leaning Tower: Contestants must swim out to retrieve 12 pegs that will help them climb a telephone pole with a bell at the top. The first to the climb to the top and ring the bell wins.
  - Played by: Abram vs. Kenny vs. Tonya
- Ring Wrestle: Contestants must all hold onto a ring and wrestle it out of the other's hands. The last person remaining wins.
  - Played by: Abram vs. Derrick vs. Johnny
- The Rack: Contestants must sit on two parallel bars situated over water and never lose contact with both bars. The last person remaining wins.
  - Played by: KellyAnne vs. Rachel vs. Robin
- Ball Buster: Contestants get to pick a partner and they all must fight to push a 9-foot-tall (2.7 m) ball into their goal twice. The first person to do so wins.
  - Played by: Ashli vs. Jenn vs. Paula (Note: Ashli, Paula and Jenn had to pick a partner for the "Ball Buster" face-off. They respectively chose Derrick, Dunbar and Tyrie.)
- Bridge It: Contestants must walk back and forth across a bridge. After every time they walk across, they must remove one of the planks, making it more difficult for the next person to walk across. The only person who does not fall from the bridge wins.
  - Played by: Dan vs. Evelyn vs. Tyrie
- Rat in a Cage: Contestants are each be locked in their own cage and each has four locks. Four keys are scattered that they have to untie. The first out of the cage wins.
  - Played by: Johnny vs. Cohutta vs. Derrick
- Timbur: Contestants must stand on a stump and hold two heavy tree trunks up with each arm. Whoever holds the two tree trunks the longest wins.
  - Played by: Johanna vs. Colie vs. Ryan
- Water Bound: Contestants are shackled at the ankles and dropped in a tank of water with a weight. They must continuously bounce up and sink back down with the weight. The person who holds the weight the longest wins.
  - Played by: Dan vs. Evelyn vs. KellyAnne vs. Johanna

== Game summary ==
Episode		Face-off participants	Face-off outcome				
#	Face-off	Face-off participants	Winner	Key Stolen	Saved	Eliminated	Vote
1	Leaning Tower	Abram	Abram	—N/a	Kenny	Tonya	14-3
1	Leaning Tower	Kenny	Abram	—N/a	Kenny	Tonya	14-3
1	Leaning Tower	Tonya	Abram	—N/a	Kenny	Tonya	14-3
2	Ring Wrestle	Abram	Derrick	—N/a	Johnny	Abram	9-6
2	Ring Wrestle	Derrick	Derrick	—N/a	Johnny	Abram	9-6
2	Ring Wrestle	Johnny	Derrick	—N/a	Johnny	Abram	9-6
3	The Rack	KellyAnne	KellyAnne	—N/a	Robin	Rachel	8-6
3	The Rack	Rachel	KellyAnne	—N/a	Robin	Rachel	8-6
3	The Rack	Robin	KellyAnne	—N/a	Robin	Rachel	8-6
4	Ball Buster	Ashli	Paula	—N/a	Jenn	Ashli	7-0
4	Ball Buster	Jenn	Paula	—N/a	Jenn	Ashli	7-0
4	Ball Buster	Paula	Paula	—N/a	Jenn	Ashli	7-0
5	Bridge It	Dan	Evelyn	Johnny	Dan	Tyrie	9-2
5	Bridge It	Evelyn	Evelyn	Johnny	Dan	Tyrie	9-2
5	Bridge It	Tyrie	Evelyn	Johnny	Dan	Tyrie	9-2
6	Rat in a Cage	Cohutta	Johnny	Evelyn	Derrick	Cohutta	10-1
6	Rat in a Cage	Derrick	Johnny	Evelyn	Derrick	Cohutta	10-1
6	Rat in a Cage	Johnny	Johnny	Evelyn	Derrick	Cohutta	10-1
7	Timber	Colie	Ryan	KellyAnne	Johanna	Colie	10-0
7	Timber	Johanna	Ryan	KellyAnne	Johanna	Colie	10-0
7	Timber	Ryan	Ryan	KellyAnne	Johanna	Colie	10-0
8	Water Bound	Dan	Evelyn	Dunbar	—N/a	Dan	—N/a
8	Water Bound	Evelyn	Evelyn	Dunbar	—N/a	Dunbar	—N/a
8	Water Bound	Johanna	Evelyn	Dunbar	—N/a	Johanna	—N/a
8	Water Bound	KellyAnne	Evelyn	Dunbar	—N/a	KellyAnne	—N/a
8	Final Challenge	Winners: Derrick, Evelyn, Johnny, Kenny			2nd place: Jenn, Paula, Robin, Ryan		

Red Boat
Blue Boat

=== Elimination progress ===
Contestants	Episodes								
Contestants	1	2	3	4	5	6	7	Finale	
Derrick	SAFE	WIN	SAFE	SAFE	SAFE	RISK	SAFE	SAFE	WINNER
Evelyn	SAFE	SAFE	SAFE	SAFE	WON	LOSE	SAFE	WON	WINNER
Johnny	SAFE	SAVE	SAFE	SAFE	LOSE	WON	SAFE	SAFE	WINNER
Kenny	SAVE	SAFE	SAFE	SAFE	SAFE	SAFE	SAFE	SAFE	WINNER
Jenn	SAFE	SAFE	SAFE	SAVE	SAFE	SAFE	SAFE	SAFE	LOSER
Paula	SAFE	SAFE	SAFE	WIN	SAFE	SAFE	SAFE	SAFE	LOSER
Robin	SAFE	SAFE	SAVE	SAFE	SAFE	SAFE	SAFE	SAFE	LOSER
Ryan	SAFE	SAFE	SAFE	SAFE	SAFE	SAFE	WON	SAFE	LOSER
Dunbar	SAFE	KEY	SAFE	SAFE	SAFE	SAFE	SAFE	LOST	
Johanna	SAFE	SAFE	SAFE	SAFE	SAFE	SAFE	RISK	LAST	
KellyAnne	SAFE	SAFE	WIN	SAFE	SAFE	SAFE	LOSE	LAST	
Dan	SAFE	SAFE	SAFE	SAFE	RISK	SAFE	SAFE	LAST	
Colie	SAFE	SAFE	SAFE	SAFE	SAFE	SAFE	OUT		
Cohutta	SAFE	SAFE	SAFE	SAFE	SAFE	OUT			
Tyrie	SAFE	SAFE	SAFE	SAFE	OUT				
Ashli	SAFE	SAFE	SAFE	OUT					
Rachel	SAFE	SAFE	OUT						
Abram	WIN	OUT							
Dave	SAFE	QUIT							
Tonya	OUT								

Competition
The contestant won the competition
The contestant made it to the end of the challenge, but lost in the final
The contestant won the face-off and a key
The contestant won the face-off and took the key of another contestant
The contestant lost the face-off, but was not eliminated and received a key
The contestant lost the face-off, but was not eliminated
The contestant had their key stolen by the face-off winner
The contestant had their key stolen by the face-off winner and was automatically eliminated
The contestant lost the face-off and was automatically eliminated
The contestant lost the face-off and was voted out
The contestant quit the competition
The contestant was given a key by an eliminated player

== Voting progress ==
Voted Out	Tonya; 14 of 17 votes	Abram; 9 of 15 votes	Rachel; 8 of 14 votes	Ashli; 7 of 13 votes	Tyrie; 9 of 11 votes	Cohutta; 10 of 11 votes	Colie; 10 of 10 votes	No Vote
Players	Episodes							
Players	1	2	3	4	5	6	7	8
Derrick	Kenny		Rachel	Ashli	Tyrie		Colie	
Evelyn	Tonya	Johnny	Robin	Ashli		Cohutta	Colie	
Johnny	Tonya		Rachel	Ashli	Tyrie		Colie	
Kenny		Abram	Rachel	Not Shown	Tyrie	Cohutta	Colie	
Jenn	Kenny	Johnny	Robin		Dan	Cohutta	Colie	
Paula	Tonya	Abram	Rachel		Tyrie	Cohutta	Colie	
Robin	Tonya	Johnny		Not Shown	Tyrie	Cohutta	Colie	
Ryan	Kenny	Abram	Rachel	Not Shown	Tyrie	Cohutta		
Dunbar	Tonya	Abram	Rachel	Not Shown	Tyrie	Cohutta	Colie	
Johanna	Tonya	Abram	Rachel	Not Shown	Not Shown	Cohutta		
KellyAnne	Tonya	Johnny		Ashli	Tyrie	Derrick	Colie	
Dan	Tonya	Abram	Rachel	Ashli		Cohutta	Colie	
Colie	Tonya	Abram	Robin	Not Shown	Dan	Cohutta		
Cohutta	Tonya	Abram	Robin	Ashli	Tyrie			
Tyrie	Tonya	Abram	Robin	Ashli				
Ashli	Tonya	Johnny	Robin					
Rachel	Tonya	Johnny						
Abram								
Dave	Tonya							
Tonya								

== Key holders ==
Key	Episode							
Key	1	2	3	4	5	6	7	8
1	Abram	Dunbar						Evelyn
2	Kenny							
3		Derrick						
4		Johnny			Evelyn	Johnny		
5			KellyAnne				Ryan	
6			Robin					
7				Paula				
8				Jenn				

- Key holder at the end of each episode

== Episodes ==
No. overall	No. in season	Title	Original release date
213	1	"Welcome to the Island"	September 10, 2008
214	2	"Calling It Quits"	September 17, 2008
215	3	"Girl Fight"	September 24, 2008
216	4	"Are You a Quitter?"	October 1, 2008
217	5	"Ev vs. The Island"	October 8, 2008
218	6	"Island King"	October 15, 2008
219	7	"Down to the Wire"	October 22, 2008
220	8	"Sailing to Victory"	October 29, 2008

=== Reunion special ===
The Island Reunion: The Final Face Off aired on November 5, 2008 and was hosted by Carlos Santos from MTV Tres. The cast members who attended were: Johanna, Paula, Kenny, Derrick, Johnny, Evelyn, Ryan, Jenn, KellyAnne and Robin. A promo from the upcoming The Real World: Brooklyn season is shown.

== Controversy ==
The season sparked controversy for production's poor respect of the local environment. Panamanian locals criticised MTV for clearing a small patch of forest for construction, developing an access road through the forest and installing generators and lighting on the beach.
