= Real World/Road Rules Challenge (season) =

2nd season of the reality television series

- Season 2
- Presented by: David Edwards
- No. of contestants: 12
- Winners: Anne Wharton; Kalle Dedolph; Kefla Hare; Mark Long; Noah Rickun; Roni Martin
- Location: San Francisco; Los Angeles; Las Vegas
- No. of episodes: 6

Release
- Original network: MTV
- Original release: November 9 – December 14, 1999

Season chronology
- ← Previous; Road Rules: All Stars Next → Challenge 2000

Real World/Road Rules Challenge (occasionally referred to as Real World vs. Road Rules) is the second season of the MTV reality game show, The Challenge. Cast members from The Real World and Road Rules competed for their share of $50,000.

The season marked the first time in which "Real World/Road Rules Challenge" would be used as the show's main title (by the 19th season, the program would be renamed yet again simply to The Challenge).

== Format ==
It is the first six-on-six Challenge in the series. The teams traveled via tour bus and RV starting in San Francisco, ending in Universal City, California, competing in different individual challenges. The winning team had the right to travel in a tour bus, while the losing team had to travel in an RV. Each time a team won an individual challenge, they won the right to spend time in a "money machine". The "money machine", set up outside Universal Studios Hollywood in Universal City, California was a huge wind chamber that contained up to $50,000. Whatever the casts could keep on them, they were guaranteed to keep. This season also featured an additional challenge where the two teams competed over possession of a teddy bear. Whichever team had the teddy bear in their possession at an unknown, predetermined point in the challenge, would win the additional challenge.

== Cast ==
Mr. Big: David Edwards from The Real World: Los Angeles

Real World team
Player	Original season
Beth Stolarczyk	The Real World: Los Angeles
Janet Choi	The Real World: Seattle
Jason Cornwell	The Real World: Boston
Montana McGlynn	The Real World: Boston
Nathan Blackburn	The Real World: Seattle
Neil Forrester	The Real World: London

Road Rules team
Player	Original season
Anne Wharton	Road Rules: Northern Trail
Kalle Dedolph	Road Rules: Islands
Kefla Hare	Road Rules: Down Under
Mark Long	Road Rules: USA – The First Adventure
Noah Rickun	Road Rules: Northern Trail
Roni Martin	Road Rules: Northern Trail

== Challenge games ==
- Roller Derby: Teams face off in a typical roller derby game. A player that passes the most opponents after one round earns a point for the team. The team that earns the most points at the end of the game wins.
  - Winners: Road Rules
- Bed Race: Teams are instructed to come up with a theme and decorate a mattress in preparation for the mission. One member of the team stays on the bed while the rest of the team pushes the bed down a road in a race against the opposite team. The team that wins two races out of three wins.
  - Winners: Road Rules
- Bungee Jump: Players from the team are strapped by the ankles and are instructed to bungee jump from a high place down into a lake where colored rings are placed. Each ring is worth one point. The team with the most points wins.
  - Winners: Road Rules
- Las Vegas Talent Show: Teams take part in a talent show in front of a live audience in Las Vegas. The winner is determined by judges' votes. The most entertaining show wins.
  - Winners: Real World
- Boot Camp: Teams are driven to an army boot camp where they are required to live like soldiers for the day and participate in drills. For each drill they complete first, that team earns a point. The team that earns the most points at the end wins.
  - Infiltration Course: The teams are instructed to get every team member from one end of an obstacle course and into the trenches. The first team to get all the members to cross the finish line wins.
  - React Station: Teams are given four different sized wooden boards and are required to get every team member and supplies across a course by building a bridge over blue stumps. Players are not allowed to use red stumps or it's an automatic disqualification. The first team to get all the members to cross the finish line wins.
  - Obstacle Course: Team members face-off against each other in a race through an obstacle course. The first player to get to the end wins.
  - Two-Line Bridge: Teams are given a load of supplies and must transfer them through an obstacle course. The team that transfers their supplies the fastest wins.
    - Winners: Road Rules
- Money Chamber: Teams are given the allotted minutes they have earned throughout the season to grab as much money as they can in a money chamber out of $50,000. The team that grabs the most money wins.
  - Winners: Road Rules

== Game summary ==
Episode		Mission outcome	
#	Challenge	Winners	Losers
1	Roller Derby	Road Rules	Real World
2	Bed Race	Road Rules	Real World
3	Bungee Jump	Road Rules	Real World
4	Las Vegas Talent Show	Real World	Road Rules
5	Boot Camp	Road Rules	Real World
6	Handsome Reward	Road Rules	Real World

Real World
Road Rules

=== Mini challenges ===
Episode		Mission outcome		Prize
#	Challenge	Winners	Losers	Prize
1	Golden Dollar	Real World	Road Rules	Limo ride
1	Teddy Bear Steal	Real World	Road Rules	$3,000
3	Japanese Pacer	—N/a	Road Rules	—N/a
3	Snoop Doggy Dogg	Real World	—N/a	Hotel suite

=== Final results ===
- Road Rules won the final challenge, earning a total of $39,680, with each team member receiving $6,613.
- Real World lost the final challenge, earning $10,240, while also winning an additional $3,000 in the "Teddy Bear Steal" mini-challenge, for a total bank of $13,240, with each team member receiving $2,206.

== Episodes ==
No. overall	No. in season	Title	Original release date
6	1	"Money Changes Everything"	November 9, 1999
The game begun when six cast members from The Real World and Road Rules each were brought together at the AT&T baseball stadium, where thousands of fake dollar bills of The Real World: Los Angeles housemate David Edwards, with the object of find a golden dollar. The game was won by Real World when Jason found the golden dollar, earning a limo for the team to the first challenge. Kefla and Roni later get massages together, establishing a connection. Janet and Jason begin a flirtatious relationship. Later, the teams compete against each other in the Roller Derby mission, in which Beth sustained an injury. The players told of a secondary prize where if they are in possession of a teddy bear at a certain point in the game, they would win an addition $3,000 for their team. The episode ends with the Beth in the hospital with a bandaged ankle while the Real World team are hoping that she is sent home.
7	2	"Bed Sores"	November 16, 1999
Beth remains in the competition, despite concerns from the group. The teams are then told they would be bed racing against each other. After the teams stop to come up with themes for their beds and test them out, Jason and Janet take the break to get closer to one another. Several attempts are made by both teams in acquiring the teddy bear for their team. Kalle and Nathan spark a connection between each other, which brings up suspicions from his team. At the Bed Race mission, the Road Rules team easily defeats Real World. The teams are given the choice between two jobs: Japanese Pacer and "Snoop Doggy" Dogg. Later, as they drive to the next town, the Real World team is stopped by a police officer because of the outlandish spraypaint on the Winnebego. After being let go, the Winnebego breaks down, forcing Real World to hitch a ride with Road Rules.
8	3	"Getting Drunk"	November 23, 1999
The teams head to Hollywood to the YMCA where they get into athletic gear and meet Kobe Bryant and Reggie Miller. They are then told that the jobs they chose in the previous episode determine what they would be doing. Since Real World chose Snoop Doggy Dogg, they would have to wash Kobe Bryant's dogs, in exchange for $200 and a stay at a nice suite. Meanwhile, Road Rules would face off 6-on-2 in a basketball game, refereed by The Real World: Boston housemate Syrus Yarbrough, against Kobe and Reggie, much to Nathan's dismay, with money at stake. The Real World team successfully groom's Kobe's dogs and earn $200 and the suite while Road Rules end up losing against Kobe and Reggie and owe them $40. The teams are given their next clue and party while staying at the suite. Montana and Noah develop a love-hate relationship while Kefla and Roni's relationship heats up at the club. Later, the teams are surprised that the next mission is a Bungee Jump, to the fear of the Real World girls. The episode ends with Janet having a panic attack over jumping.
9	4	"The Joint is Jumping"	November 30, 1999
Beth and Montana's reluctance to jump sparks an argument between Kefla and Roni and the Real World team. After the instructor had taken down, Janet returns and takes the leap, but it was not enough to win as Montana and Beth decided not to do the mission. Beth gets annoyed that the Montana doesn't catch as much flack as she did for not jumping. After the mission, the teams are given their next clue which leads them to Vegas. Real World is given a new Winnebego. The teams learn that they would be performing in a Las Vegas Talent Show. Roni and Kefla take a walk through the strip while the teams go clubbing. Nathan begins contemplating his relationship with Kalle. The Real World teams steals the teddy bear. Real World finally wins a mission and earns a minute in the money chamber, thereby breaking the Road Rules streak.
10	5	"Shall We Play A Game?"	December 7, 1999
The teams get another clue, informing them to go to a boot camp in Oceanside, California. Noah and Montana continue their cross-team flirtation. After a drunken night, Montana swears to her team she and Noah did not hook up. The teams arrive at the Pendleton US Marine Corps and prepare for their next mission, which is a very difficult military-based challenge. Neil throws a tantrum about doing the mission, but decides to do the mission for the good of the team. However, despite great efforts by Nathan, the Road Rules team wins 3 to 1, earning another minute in the chamber. Tired and exhausted, the teams make their next stop at the Playboy Mansion.
11	6	"Handsome Reward"	December 14, 1999
The teams are greeted by Playboy Playmate Victoria Silvstedt, and are shown around the mansion. Most of the cast have a good time at the mansion, even getting to meet Hugh Hefner, himself. However, Montana is annoyed about staying at the mansion with all of the models. Noah begins flirting with one of the playmates, sparking jealousy from Montana, even angering one of the models. During their night of fun, Anne hurts her ankle on a trampoline. Janet and Jason's relationship heats up at the tennis courts. The teams are then told that they would go down to a junk yard where they would be blowing up the broken down winnebego, Bessie. During a game of truths, many of the cast reflect on their relationships with one another and their possible futures. The cast meet David at Universal Studios to grab the money in the chamber. Anne is forced to sit out of the chamber, but Road Rules still manages to earn more money than Real World, with a $39,680 bank account — $6,613 per player, while the Real World team finished with a $10,240 bank account — $1,706 for each player. In the additional Teddy Bear Steal challenge, Real World wins and earning $3,000.
