= Setzler =

Setzler is a surname. Notable people with the surname include:

- Dan Setzler
- Ed Setzler (born 1970), American politician
- Nikki G. Setzler (born 1945), American politician
- Wilfried Setzler (born 1943), German historian and germanist
