= The Real World: Seattle =

Season of television series

Coordinates: 47°36′54.0″N 122°21′17.7″W

- Season 7
- The cast of The Real World: Seattle
- Starring: Janet Choi; Nathan Blackburn; Rebecca Lord; Lindsay Brien; Stephen Williams; Irene McGee; David Burns
- No. of episodes: 20

Release
- Original network: MTV
- Original release: June 16 – November 3, 1998

Season chronology
- ← Previous; The Real World: Boston Next → The Real World: Hawaii

The Real World: Seattle is the seventh season of MTV's reality television series The Real World, which focuses on a group of diverse strangers living together for several months in a different city each season, as cameras follow their lives and interpersonal relationships. It is the third season of The Real World to be filmed in the Pacific States region, specifically in Washington and is also the first season to be filmed in the Pacific Northwest.

The season featured seven people who lived on Pier 70 of Seattle, Washington's Elliott Bay. The season premiered on June 16, 1998, and consisted of 20 episodes. It is the first of two seasons to be filmed in Seattle. Eighteen years later, the show returned to the city in its thirty-second season.

It is notable for an incident in which cast member Stephen Williams slapped Irene McGee as she moved out of the house, which is cited as one of the series' memorable moments by Time magazine.

== Season changes ==
This season was the first to feature cast members who knew each other before arriving at the house. David and Nathan were both cadets at the Virginia Military Institute, which is why they say "This is the true story of seven people" instead of "seven strangers" in the opening sequence.

== Assignment ==
Almost every season of The Real World, beginning with its fifth season, has included the assignment of a season-long group job or task to the housemates. The Seattle cast worked as "modulators" at KNDD-FM, an alternative rock radio station. Their job begins as a series of promotional duties but eventually leads to producing and hosting a live radio show.

== The residence ==
The cast lived at Pier 70, a 140,000-square-foot (13,000 m^{2}) pier located at 2815 Alaskan Way in Seattle, just north of the intersection of Alaskan Way and Clay Street, on Elliott Bay. It was built in 1902 by shipping industry pioneers Ainsworth & Dunn. One of the largest docks on the waterfront, Pier 70 initially served sailing and steamer ships, such as the famous Blue Funnel Line, a fleet of large freighters that operated between Europe, the Orient and the Pacific Coast. In 1916, a spectacular fire destroyed the upper Pier and roof, and required rebuilding of the dock. During World War II, the Washington state Liquor Board used the Pier as a warehouse, and from 1946 to 1955, the United States Coast Guard used it as its Seattle base. In 1970, Ainsworth & Dunn converted it into retail and restaurant space. Triad Development bought it in 1995 and converted it into office/retail space for tenants such as Pier 1 Imports. A pier would again be used for a season residence on The Real World: Brooklyn in 2009.

For filming of the season, the interior design was handled by Two Downtown, Ltd. Residential use of the Pier is prohibited by urban harborfront districting, which required the production to obtain a special permit declaring the Pier a 24-hour film set. It has since been completely remodeled, with its brick surface replaced with conventional siding, and only somewhat resembles the pier seen during filming. It is now used for retail and office space, and is home to the Waterfront Seafood Grill, which changed its name to Aqua by El Gaucho in 2011. The original seven roommates of Real World Seattle: Bad Blood dined at Aqua by El Gaucho in their season's first episode in 2016.

== Cast ==
| Cast member | Age | Hometown |
|---|---|---|
| Janet Choi | 21 | Chicago, Illinois |
Janet is a Korean-American woman whose parents worked long hours at their family-owned restaurant while she was raised by her grandmother, whom she adores. She has struggled between loyalty to the traditions of her parents' culture and her own. She is a junior at Northwestern University with a double major in broadcast journalism and international studies, and is preparing for a career in international investigative reporting.
| Nathan Blackburn | 21 | Chesterfield, Virginia |
Nathan was raised by his father from the age of five to 15, when his father died of cancer. He then moved in with his grandmother, and took on adult responsibilities. Nathan recently was reacquainted with his mother for the first time in 15 years, and met his nine-year-old half brother. Like David, Nathan is also a fourth-year student at the Virginia Military Institute (VMI), and they lived together in Prague during a semester abroad. He and the long-distance relationship he struggles to maintain with his girlfriend Stephanie is another focal point of the show.
| Rebecca Lord | 19 | Charlottesville, Virginia |
MTV describes Rebecca as an old-fashioned Victorian romantic who pines for an ideal love. She immerses herself in books and music, but is also an extrovert who's the first one to step up and sing with a band or take a stage dive. She also has an avid interest in feminist theory, and studies and women's studies at the University of Virginia. She is an aspiring singer who gets to record a song with Sir Mix-a-Lot during her time in Seattle. She reveals in her audition tape that she is a virgin.
| Lindsay Brien | 21 | Aspen, Colorado |
MTV describes Lindsay, who is an Aspen, Colorado radio show personality, as a 5-foot-1-inch, hyperactive wild child. She is a junior at the University of Michigan who says her mother and brother may be the only people who truly know her, as the loss of her father when she was a teenager made them very close. During the season, when she learns via a phone call that a friend committed suicide, she is inconsolably heartbroken.
| Stephen Williams | 20 | San Diego, California |
Stephen is the oldest of five children raised by his mother in a black Muslim household. He converted to Judaism at age 15, and met his father for the first time when he was 17. He's an active member of Sigma Alpha Mu fraternity and is a business major with a minor in African-American studies at the University of California at Berkeley. During the show, Williams made a number of homophobic comments, including his response to the accusation of his being gay. Years after the show aired, Stephen came out as gay. In what has become one of the most infamous moments in Real World history, Stephen slaps Irene after she claims that he is gay.
| Irene McGee | 22 | Pleasant Valley, New York |
Irene's trademark, according to MTV, is her quirkiness. She is a student at Georgetown University, but having Lyme disease makes things difficult for her. She also has problems with commitment, which she attributes to being too high-maintenance. Irene develops a close friendship with Nathan. She eventually leaves the show, who are upset to see her leave, especially since Irene had talked Janet into not leaving when she was considering it.
| David Burns | 21 | Charlestown, Massachusetts |
David grew up in a tough neighborhood, and lost many childhood friends to violent deaths and jail sentences, but was saved from the streets by his tennis coach and mentor. He was eventually recruited to the Virginia Military Institute, from which he knows Nathan, on a tennis scholarship. In response to problems in his beloved hometown, David and his mother helped form a neighborhood drug task force. David begins a relationship with Kira, a casting director for Bunim-Murray Productions. This is a violation of the rules, and Kira loses her job as a direct result. David naturally has one blue eye and one brown eye.

== Episodes ==
| No. overall | No. in season | Title | Original release date |
|---|---|---|---|
| 123 | 1 | "Seattle's Best" | June 16, 1998 |
Two cadets from the Virginia Military Institute—who also happen to be best friends—are cast for this season's Real World. Before joining the Institute, David overcame drugs and life on the streets of Boston. Nathan explains that he raised himself from the age of 15 after the death of his father. But Nathan also had some help from his girlfriend Stephanie—her family took him in like one of their own. Nathan and David arrive on a wide pier in Seattle and explore the place. Rebecca is next to arrive then Janet shows up. Despite his girlfriend back home, Nathan is tempted, while Janet secretly thinks that Nate is a hottie. After a trolley ride together Lindsay and Stephen arrive at the house. Lindsay and Janet click immediately like long-lost friends. Irene is last to arrive. Janet and Lindsay share a room, while Rebecca and Irene pair off and the boys move into their own room. Stephen realizes that none of the roommates are gay or lesbian, while Nathan gets into an argument with Stephanie for not calling sooner. David admits he cried last night, and Nate predicts a romance between Lindsay and David.
| 124 | 2 | "Feeling Each Other Out" | June 23, 1998 |
Nate and Stephanie continue to have problems—she wants to quit school and join him, while Nathan suggests they temporarily break up. Meanwhile, in the exercise area, David pumps iron while Lindsay reads a sex manual and Rebecca reads a massage therapy book. David thinks the difference between them is clear: Lindsay is a sex demon and Rebecca is subtle. Stephen and Rebecca head out to explore the city. Nathan gives Janet a hand massage in the Jacuzzi, and it's clear there's something going on. Lindsay finds a page torn from a diary on the table that says, "I wish they would have brought in more diverse people--not all upper white and college educated." Lindsay shares the note with Nathan and Janet, and Nate guesses that Stephen wrote it. Now Nathan is upset; he thinks Stephen should just say what's on his mind. Later that afternoon, Nathan clues David in about the journal entry and David says he wrote it. Now Nathan feels like an ass for assuming the author had been Stephen. The gang goes out for the night, and David and Nathan pick up a couple of women. Stephen gets pissed when he and Rebecca are carded at one club and head home, while the rest of the roomies stay out. Later, Stephen lets the boys know he's upset about being ditched. David defends himself, reminding Stephen that he agreed the best idea was to go home with Rebecca in a taxi, and the air is cleared. David, Nathan, and Stephen are tucked under the covers when suddenly Janet and Lindsay burst into the room, jumping on the beds.
| 125 | 3 | "Tough To Be A Rockstar" | June 30, 1998 |
David and Rebecca are hanging out late at night, going for long walks, having dinner together. The two seem to be making a love connection. Meanwhile, Irene is stressed out and heads to the chiropractor's office. The roommates head over to headquarters for 107.7 The End—the hottest alternative rock radio station in Seattle—and meet Phil, the Programming Director. They'll start off as modulators, then get their own radio show.The next morning, the roomies head off for their first day of work. They learn they will be working an "End session"—the band Cornershop will play in the studio for 16 lucky listeners. Irene mistakenly chats up the tech guys, thinking they're members of the band. Later in the week, the roomies conduct a station promotion during a concert at a local nightclub. Rebecca gets on stage to thank the crowd and suddenly breaks out singing. The crowd goes wild, and David seems to love her innocence. The rockers and the roomies all head back to the pier, deciding to crash the Jacuzzi. The girls dive right in with the rockers, but David gets a little jealous. Next day, the lead singer from the band asks Rebecca out to the Seattle SuperSonics game—and she accepts. David feels rejected, but says nothing. Instead, he waits up all night, making sure Rebecca returns safely from her date. David accuses Rebecca of breaking hearts and pretending not to realize the destruction she leaves in her wake.
| 126 | 4 | "I Love You, Don't Touch Me" | July 7, 1998 |
The roomies must start at the bottom before they get their own radio show. Today, that means lugging equipment out of a sound studio and packing it in the location van. As Lindsay and Rebecca shove an enormous speaker into the hallway, they rip the door-frame to shreds. The staff at the sound studio explain that the roomies will have to repair the damage. There seems to be a lot sexual tension between Nathan and Irene—they both have the same sense of humor. When Nathan gets emotional about Stephanie, Irene is ready to give out the backrubs and tells him to stop worrying about Stephanie so much. Back in her own bedroom, Irene confesses to Janet that she has never had a boyfriend, but is close with tons of guys who are "just friends." Nathan confesses that he can see himself marrying Stephanie, and Irene says he's putting a lot of pressure on himself. The other roomies are starting to wonder about their sexual vibe with Nathan and Irene having goofy fights, rolling around the floor and grabbing each other. The next day, Lindsay, Rebecca, and Janet hike to the studio and break out the tools to fix the door frame. Back on the pier, Nathan is on the phone with Stephanie. He's jealous, and she wants things back to normal. After she hangs up on him, Nathan and Irene go out dancing.
| 127 | 5 | "Be Mine" | July 14, 1998 |
Nathan and Janet head out to buy Valentine's Day gifts for Stephanie. Janet reveals that her parents are angry because they didn't want her to take part in the show. Back at the pier, Stephen places a call to Natasha, his ex-girlfriend, because he's lonely. Irene receives a stuffed singing gorilla from Grandma, and the local florist tells Janet there's a delivery for her. That night, Nathan and Stephen get into a fight when the taxi they've called is late. David steps in to defend Nate, and proves to Stephen that Nathan and David stick up for each other, no matter what. When the roomies arrive at the club, they hand out stickers to promote the station. Feeling like a third wheel, Stephen walks out during dinner later, and the tension lifts. On the phone with a friend, Stephen gets some good advice: Kill them with kindness. Nate and Stephen make up later that night. On Valentine's Day, the roomies assist as one of the DJs, Andy Savage, performs a marriage ceremony for 107 couples. Janet receives flowers from her family, and she starts to cry. Natasha phones Stephen to wish him a happy day. The gang goes drinking to drown their sorrows, and Stephen gets sick later. Nate is right there to help him.
| 128 | 6 | "Older Man, Well To Do - Younger Man, Not Doin' Too Well" | July 21, 1998 |
The roomies trek out to trip the light fantastic at a gay club. Janet and Lindsay are bumping and grinding on the dance floor, while a local drag queen takes a liking to David. They dance and end up kissing. David meets a handsome fellow named Harry at the gym. That night, Harry invites David to dinner and a Sonics game along with Nate. David decides he wants to hang out with Harry, regardless of the man's intentions. Meanwhile, Stephen has befriended his own gay buddy who just so happens to be called David. They hang out, and he asks if Stephen is gay. Stephen says no, which surprises David Also. Back at the pier, Nathan and David wonder if Stephen might be gay. The girls doubt it. But while Stephen is playing pool with Chris of Super Deluxe, Chris says that Aubbie, the roomies' boss at the radio station, is telling everyone that Stephen is gay. The next day, Harry calls David, inviting him over to watch some movies. David's a little shaken and upset. Janet admits she initially though David was gay, and Nate confesses some of the guys at school asked him if David were gay. Now he's worried. He gets on the phone with his friend Kelly, who reveals that some of her girlfriends also thought he was gay. David flips. Stephen confronts Aubbie, and she apologizes for starting the rumor. But later in the confessional, Stephen starts crying and admits that he had fun with David Also and is confused. Meanwhile, David tells Harry he can't hang out with him anymore, then shows Lindsay and Irene his manhood.
| 129 | 7 | "Birthday Bashes And Romantic Crashes" | July 28, 1998 |
David takes a lonely stroll to a phone booth where he makes a call that includes the words, "When you stole my heart, you stole my sexual desire. For the first time I'm giving my heart to another woman." When David returns home, he refuses to answer questions about his whereabouts. After a shift at the radio station, David has a relaxing dinner with their boss, Aubbie. The next day, David buys his lady a necklace, and the rest of the gang grows more curious. The roomies celebrate Irene's birthday with drinks, burgers, and a cake with ketchup. At a club later, Nate gets upset because he hasn't heard from Stephanie, and takes it out on Irene with some mean teasing. The two talk the next morning, and Irene blames the alcohol. He blames his girlfriend. David finally reveals his mystery woman—Kira, the casting director for The Real World. During an emotional phone call to David, she makes her feelings known: "I want people to understand I broke all the rules. I'm not saying for you to choose me." David responds,"This is my life. I would choose you over anything."
| 130 | 8 | "Rollercoaster of Love" | August 4, 1998 |
The gang stocks up on snowboarding gear for their next work assignment. Irene wants to find some boys, but she's stressed because she's never boarded before. David gets a new job. He gets up early to toss some tuna with the guys down at Pike Place Fish Market. Meanwhile, Kira's on her way to Seattle, and it'll be the first time they've seen each other since the show began. She's a little self-conscious. The whole house welcomes her with open arms. The roomies wake up early and head to the slopes for radio duty. David's got his woman, though, so he sleeps in and ditches the duty. Aubbie is less than thrilled, and lets everyone else know just how she feels. After a day of bruises, falls, and split lips (Irene), the kids return to the house and Stephen tells David that Aubbie reported him to Phil, the head at the station. Later that night, the kids and Kira curl discuss just how bizarre Dave and Kira's relationship is, and everyone realizes: The girl that helped put them all on the show gave up all she had for a man. She broke the rules and lost her job. Now she wonders if so much sacrifice was worth it, and thinks David should leave the show. Kira can't handle this much emotion under the lens, so she jets out in her truck alone. David finds her later and the two have a passionate argument. The next morning, David's late for the fish market and gets a good scolding. At the radio station, Phil also lays into David for slacking. David's love for Kira is out of control—more tears, talking, and arguing before Kira leaves.
| 131 | 9 | "A Mountain of Emotion" | August 11, 1998 |
Nathan, Rebecca, and Irene travel to R.E.I., an outdoor gear and clothing store, to discuss radio ads. They find out that R.E.I. is sending them to Nepal for some first-hand experience. At the house, the gang goes wild. Lindsay is ecstatic because her brother is coming to town. Lindsay explains, "This kid is all I have. He and my mom. They're all I have in life." Lindsay and Janet discuss their worries about the upcoming high altitude trip. Lindsay's brother picks a few tunes on his guitar while Lindsay reveals details about her father's death from colon cancer. Nathan requests for the brother to sing the tune he wrote about their father since Nathan was close to his own dad. At R.E.I., the cast stocks up on supplies for the trip, then get their shots. After a long plane ride, the gang arrives in Nepal. It's vibrant and colorful, with snake charmers and monkeys roaming the streets. A chopper takes them to Mount Everest, where the altitude takes its toll. Janet decides to light up a cigarette, then passes out in the snow later. Everyone's scared, but she slowly regains consciousness.
| 132 | 10 | "Time For a Change" | August 18, 1998 |
During their stay in Nepal, the cast must produce six R.E.I. commercial spots for the radio. This means sampling the natural sounds of Nepal along with organizing a production plan, and Stephen takes control. Riding on mountain bikes, the cast peddles over beautiful vistas and through villages. At dinner, in front of their guests, Stephen criticizes Janet for wearing so much makeup. Upon returning to her room, Janet hears Stephen chastise her through the wall of the adjacent room. She storms into his room and tells him to shut up. The group goes hiking, and Stephen is irritated by their apparent incompetence when it comes to the radio equipment. Rebecca feels changed by their experiences, and is in love with the beauty of the culture and the women. The next day, the cast finds themselves in a raft cruising down a breath-taking green river. At camp that evening, Stephen discovers his money is missing and angrily declares that someone has stolen it. The following day, Stephen's money is found sitting right on the seat. Nate gets sick and stays in bed while the rest of the gang washes elephants. Rebecca gains confidence and finds a new freedom in Nepal. A few prayers are said in the village around lines of prayer flags. When it's time to leave, Rebecca has changed: "I'm taking away from Nepal an experience I'll never forget…I'm going to be happier for the rest of my life." Back home, Stephen hangs up prayer flags. He apologizes to Janet, and the two make up.
| 133 | 11 | "All's Fair in Love and the Deejay War" | August 25, 1998 |
The time has finally come to discuss the on-air show, and to pick the DJs. At a meeting, everyone shows interest. Unfortunately, the show only calls for three DJs. The rest of the cast will be relegated to a producer and some field reporters. With three weeks to go until the first taping, the training begins. Along with learning the technical side of running a show, they're given the chance to lay their voices down on tape. Stephanie's coming to visit, and Nate can't wait to hold her. When she shows up, things get steamy in the hot tub, and Irene even catches them fooling around in the bathroom. Phil reviews their practice tapes. Turns out Lindsay's a ringer—she has extensive experience working for a college radio show. Stephanie observes Nathan rehearsing at the station, criticizing his every word. But Nate doesn't mind. Lindsay, David and Rebecca put in the extra hours behind the mic, trying desperately to hone their skills. It's clear that the girls are working much harder than the guys on their tapes. For Nathan, the only thing more important than a radio spot is Stephanie. The morning of her departure creeps up on them. At the airport, a long hug is shared. The on-air lineup is revealed to be Lindsay, Irene and Janet. Rebecca is appointed as producer. The guys will handle the field reports. Stephen is obviously disappointed and falls silent at the meeting.
| 134 | 12 | "Love Is In The Dead Air" | September 1, 1998 |
The cast picks a name for their show: "Dead Air." The first show will be taped, but the pressure is still there. Rebecca gets to work as producer, running the board, and overseeing the overall show. The guys are relegated to hit the field and generate some material to edit, but they seem to think Rebecca is overstepping her duties. She confronts Nathan about the issue, and Stephen gets involved. Everyone becomes defensive and tensions rise. At the fish market, something's brewing between Janet and a worker named Justin. They go out for drinks in a martini bar. When Janet shares the details of her excursion with the girls, they decide it's an official date—especially since they kissed. Janet thinks he's sweet, and Justin is obviously hooked. He gives David a flower to bring home to Janet. Janet's preoccupied with her sister, mother and grandmother, who are visiting. She feels the need to validate the entire Seattle experience. Via the phone, Janet asks Justin to give her a few days off so she can "figure things out." But when Justin shows up unexpectedly at the hotel as Janet drops off her family, they bicker. He phones her the next day, but she avoids him. She thinks he put too much pressure on her and barged in after they agreed to take a few days off.
| 135 | 13 | "The Past Isn't Past" | September 8, 1998 |
David talks about his past in Boston, and how he escaped jail. David's friend Shannon comes to town. Stephen's mother is about to have a baby. David edits a bad interview at KNDD. Nathan and David get into a fight on an outing with Shannon. Stephen meets his uncle for the first time, and learns more about his father, and reads some revealing poetry to Rebecca. The girls accuse David of being a BS'er, and he is angry because of VMI's honor code. David is reprimanded at KNDD for lack of quality work. Stephen worries about his mother, but she has a successful delivery. David does a good interview, and feels better about his radio work.
| 136 | 14 | "The Truth About Irene" | September 15, 1998 |
Irene's been acting strange lately, and she reveals she's sick. Irene is suffering from headaches, and it's affecting her work on the radio commercials. Problems surface as miscommunication occurs between Irene and Janet. Lindsay suspects that there's something about Irene's past that they just don't know. Irene takes a turn for the worse. During an interview, she can't suppress the tears: "This is not something I want to be going through right now, you know what I mean? And I don't want to be talking about it I don't want to be sick right now." Stephen is concerned and spends the night with Irene on the couch in case she needs anything. Production of the R.E.I. commercials progresses, but not without conceptual and technical problems. Stephen forgets to send the commercial script to Kelsey, the R.E.I. representative, and gets reprimanded. At the house, Irene furiously cleans the house. Janet thinks it's because she needs to feel stable. On one particular night, Irene begins rambling to Janet in the bedroom. Nathan becomes the next target for her rambling mind. She attempts to deconstruct the dream he had months earlier—the one in which she had testicles. The roomies are confused and annoyed. Irene finally reveals she has Lyme disease. She goes to the doctor, with Rebecca at her side. During the drive home, Irene takes comfort in the knowledge that she truly is sick and can deal with the disease head on.
| 137 | 15 | "Irene Calls it Quits" | September 22, 1998 |
Despite Irene's sickness, the show must go on, but at a production meeting for Dead Air, Irene's exhaustion forces her to leave. The other girls do their best to fully understand her condition, but they're confused by some of Irene's comments. Rebecca feels slighted that Irene would claim that no one was there for her. The girls feel Irene's put up a defensive wall, when all they want to do is help. Irene comments, "Being sick is a real quick way to find out who's going to be your friend, and who's not." Irene wants to use the phone to call her family, but Stephen's on the line, and the two exchange nasty words. Later, he confronts her and calls her a bitch. Irene blames her medication. Stephen and Nate discuss Irene's condition, and they're not sure how her disease is affecting her brain. Meanwhile, Irene breaks down crying to Rebecca. The following day, Irene attempts to sort it out with Stephen, but the conversation doesn't go as planned when he lashes out at her. Irene tries to make him understand that she's still dealing with her relapse, but he refuses to show compassion. The rest of the gang discusses Irene's behavior over dinner, while Irene tells a friend on the phone how much she hates the house. She finally informs her roommates that she's leaving the show. Shock and disbelief ripple through the house. Irene gathers her belongings and says her final goodbyes, then calls Stephen outside for one last chat. She calls him a homosexual, and Stephen calls her a bitch. He then races back into the house and grabs the stuffed dog Irene sleeps with—which he had hidden from her. He runs outside and throws it into the water, then runs up to the car, opens the passenger door, and slaps Irene in the face.
| 138 | 16 | "The Aftermath of the Slap" | September 29, 1998 |
When David returns to the house and finds out that Stephen hit Irene, he gets angry. With a potentially dangerous confrontation between David and Stephen nearing, a necessary action is taken. The producers and directors of The Real World step in to help find a solution to a crisis. Aware that the meeting is taking place, Stephen is told that he crossed the line by slapping Irene, and that the others need to decide whether or not they want him to remain in the house. If they decide to let Stephen stay, he will have to attend therapy to deal with his anger. The cast is faced with a difficult decision. They watch the footage of Stephen slapping Irene to determine the severity of his action. When the slap occurs, they're all shocked. After a discussion, they decide that Stephen stays, but he must receive therapy for his anger. Later that night, Stephen and David meet privately to come to terms with the situation and each other. Stephen apologizes for the slap and wants to put the situation behind him and rebuild his friendship with the rest of the cast. To ease his stress, Stephen starts wearing a platinum-blonde wig so that he can laugh at himself and people can laugh at him. In the radio station, Stephen overhears Aubbie discussing the Irene slap behind his back. Disgusted that someone is verbally ripping him apart, he confronts her, and they argue. Meanwhile, the group is still confused about Irene's situation, and Rebecca is lonely without her. To better understand the disease, the cast meets with someone from the Lyme Disease Foundation.
| 139 | 17 | "Facing the Pain" | October 6, 1998 |
Lindsay and Janet take a class to prepare for skydiving and don't even pay attention. Back home, Lindsay gets a message from her close friend, Bill, who's like one of the family. David's planning to visit Kira, but they're uncertain about their future. Lindsay gets a phone call from her brother, who tells her that Bill killed himself. She breaks down and cries. Rebecca tries to comfort her, but Lindsay pulls away. The next few days pass slowly as Lindsay attempts to make sense of Bill's death. Janet wants to help her friend, but isn't sure what to do. Lindsay observes, "The difference with Bill's death and my father's death is that Bill gave up. Bill quit...I'm angry, and I'm frustrated because he took his life." She turns away when Nathan tries to hug her. David announces that his old pal, Anthony, is coming to visit. Anthony has been battling cancer for a few years, but at the present time, the disease is in remission. David's still having travel dilemmas with Kira, and that night, a mysterious pain grips David's chest. An ambulance takes him to the hospital, where he learns the pain resulted from an inflammation of the muscle tissues in the chest. Lindsay cancels her skydiving trip, aware of her own mortality. Janet goes alone, and Lindsay hugs her when she lands safely.
| 140 | 18 | "The End of the Innocence" | October 13, 1998 |
Rebecca has lunch with Ricardo, whose primary job is managing rap artist Sir Mix-A-Lot. She discusses following through with her lifelong passion of music, and he suggests she do back-up vocals. If they like her work, they'll produce a song for her. Before she knows it, Rebecca is in a professional studio behind a microphone, laying down a vocal track for Mix-A-Lot. Nathan learns that he gets the third DJ spot left open by Irene's departure, and he's psyched. When the second anniversary of Nathan and Stephanie rolls around, he heads to a bar to do a little drinking. He's upset because Stephanie hasn't called. He leaves the bar with a girl named Lisa, and they cuddle inside a car. It's unclear what happens next. Later, Nathan starts crying and says he messed up everything with Stephanie. When Stephanie arrives for another visit, Nate decides not to tell her about Lisa—he doesn't want to spoil her visit. The two re-connect and express their love for each other. Rebecca writes an original song and records it in studio, and Sir-Mix-A-Lot congratulates her on a job well done. Rebecca plays the tape of her finished song, "Innocent," for the others. After a night of drinking, Nate oversleeps and Stephanie almost misses her plane the next morning. He labels the incident as another consequence brought on by his drinking.
| 141 | 19 | "The Real World / Road Rules Aqua Games 1998" | October 20, 1998 |
The cast is challenged to The Real World/Road Rules Aqua Games Competition at Lake Washington against Road Rules: Down Under. Mark and Kit, from Road Rules 1, are hosting the games. The kids are competing for $3,000. In the first event, the Raft-O-Rama, the teams must build a raft and complete a course. Both teams end up cheating, and no points are awarded. Next event is Dueling Tubes, as they're dragged across the lake by a boat. It's Rebecca vs. Kefla. Kefla kicks her in the head and sends her flying. Next, David and Shayne battle on the open water, and David sends Shayne into the icy abyss. For the Blind-Folded Canoe, Chad and Susie face off against David and Lindsay. Blindfolded, the teams paddle out and retrieve inflatable animals, guided only by their teammates yelling from shore. The race is tight until Lindsay and David tip over. In Extreme Fishing, teams of three on jet skis head out onto the lake, scooping up silver and golden inflatable sharks with a net. Disaster strikes when the Real Worlders tip over again. Next event: The Zip Off. The teams dangle from a high wire and drop into a ring, worth points, below. Piggy goes first but gets stuck—the girls are too light to compete. Nate gets the points for the Real Worlders, sending them to the final event—Beach Bungee Bull Ride. Chad and Susie end up with a time to beat of 11.4 seconds. It's up to Nathan again. The Real World cast takes the title.
| 142 | 20 | "Closing Time" | November 3, 1998 |
The kids pack up and prepare to leave. They reflect on their experiences. Stephen is changed by his anger management sessions. When there's an altercation at a bar, he tries to talk his friend out of fighting. Nathan consoles an emotional Stephanie, who can't wait for Nate's return. On David's last day at the market, he engages in some "fishy" male bonding with his co-workers. As the kids broadcast the last Dead Air, Lindsay, is surprised that people are actually calling in, saying they will miss the show. Stephen and Oruba spend their last few days dating and talking often. Stephen knows Oruba is special, and over the phone, tries to talk her into having sex. She ends the conversation with an optimistic "you never know." On the last morning, Janet and Lindsay reflect on their friendship and the bond they have developed. After learning his lessons, Stephen says he would have been able to deal with Irene differently. He puts the "bad situation to rest" with a teddy bear memorial service. The cast heads for the airport, where they depart one by one with hugs, kisses and tears.

== Season highlights ==
Nathan must deal with having a long-distance relationship with his girlfriend, exacerbated in part by his close friendship with housemate Irene.

Lindsay is horrified when she is told over the phone that a friend has committed suicide. She does not attend the funeral, wanting to remember her friend how he was. The cast tries to console her, but she pushes them away. Janet and others worry about Lindsay's mental and physical health because she will not talk about the suicide. Lindsay says that keeping things to herself is how she deals with things.

Stephen's mother has another baby, and Stephen is worried about his mother surviving the delivery. He is seen crying on his bed and Lindsay comforts him, assuring him that both his mom and the baby will be fine.

The cast traveled to Nepal. In addition to the customary exotic vacation that is handed to RW cast members in each season, the trip was also used as a means of promoting REI, a local outdoor equipment store, and also for creating an audio diary to support their radio program. The cast climbs part of Mt. Everest, and Janet smokes on the trek. She eventually passes out from the elevation, and this frightens the cast.

The cast reacts negatively to the way the city of Seattle takes to The Real World being videotaped there. At one point, they notice a lot of people selling and wearing shirts that say, "Seattle says: The Real World sucks!"

In Episode 15, Irene moves out because, as she explains, she is experiencing a relapse of Lyme Disease. As she and Stephen are walking out to her car, she outs Stephen as homosexual. After exchanging insults and heated gestures with her and throwing her Teddy bear in the water; Stephen runs to her car door, opens it and slaps her. The cast is subsequently shown the video, and is appalled. They are given the option to evict Stephen from the house, and after some deliberation, they agree to allow him to stay, provided he attends an anger management course. In a previously unaired interview filmed at the time of her departure that aired during the 2000 reunion show, The Real World Reunion 2000, she explained that the main reason was her ethical objections to aspects of the show's production, which she characterized as an inauthentic environment designed to fabricate drama and conflict, and not the social experiment it was portrayed to be. McGee further explained that this was an unhealthy environment for her to live in, and that the stress and manipulation of the production exacerbated her illness.

== After filming ==
After the cast left the Real World pier, six of them, except for Irene, appeared to discuss their experiences both during and since their time on the show, Real World Seattle Blooper Show which aired after the season ended in 1998, and was hosted by Ananda Lewis. Rebecca told the rest of the cast and Lewis that she and Irene had stayed in touch and that Irene was "doing well" but had no interest in talking to or appearing with the rest of the cast.

While earning a master's degree in broadcast and communications from San Francisco State University, Irene McGee began a youth-oriented radio show/podcast, No One's Listening, The show has included interviews with Noam Chomsky, Lawrence Lessig, Brewster Kahle, Violet Blue, and Jimmy Wales, and won the 2006 Pubbie Award as Best Bay Area Podcast by the San Francisco Bay Area Publicity Club. She tours colleges to speak about media manipulation and reality television, has appeared on VH1 and E! Entertainment Television and was involved with a documentary about Lyme Disease, Under Our Skin: The Untold Story of Lyme Disease. She has a daughter, also named Irene.

Lindsay Brien went on to become both a TV reporter for local affiliate KHAS-TV in Hastings, NE and eventually to become part of the cast of morning team The Bert Show at radio station WWWQ in Atlanta. At last knowledge, Brien was co-host of a Tampa, Florida based TV show called The Spot.

Stephen Williams was arrested in 2001 for prostitution, and again in 2002 for stealing a car. At the 2008 Real World Awards Bash, he announced that he was gay, and engaged to his male partner Sheldon. He also stated that he apologized to Irene, and had rekindled his friendship with her, but Nathan refuted this. In the same night, Irene won the "Gone Baby Gone" award.

Rebecca Lord recorded a song with rapper Sir Mix-a-Lot. She is the leader of the pop band Becky, in which Keanu Reeves once played bass.

=== The Challenge ===
| Cast member | Seasons of The Challenge |
|---|---|
| Janet Choi | Challenge |
| Nathan Blackburn | Challenge, The Gauntlet |
| Rebecca Lord | Extreme Challenge |
| Lindsay Brien | Battle of the Seasons (2002) |
| Stephen Williams | Battle of the Seasons (2002) |
| Irene McGee | —N/a |
| David Burns | Challenge 2000, The Inferno, The Gauntlet 2 |
