= Real World/Road Rules Challenge 2000 =

3rd season of the reality television series

Challenge 2000
- Season 3
- Presented by: Gladys Sanabria
- No. of contestants: 12
- Winners: Carlos Jackson; Dan Setzler; Holly Shand; Piggy Thomas; Veronica Portillo; Yes Duffy
- Location: Las Vegas; Nashville; Miami
- No. of episodes: 11

Release
- Original network: MTV
- Original release: January 17 – April 3, 2000

Season chronology
- ← Previous; Challenge Next → Extreme Challenge

Real World/Road Rules Challenge 2000 is the third season of the MTV reality game show The Challenge (at the time known as Real World/Road Rules Challenge).

== Format ==
Real World/Road Rules Challenge 2000 is the second six-on-six The Challenge in the series. The teams traveled via tour bus starting in Las Vegas, Nevada then moving to the eastern U.S., ending in Miami, Florida after competing in different individual challenges. Each time a team won an individual challenge, they won $10,000. After each mission won, the winning team would invest those 10K in the product of their choice through E-Trade. At the end, the winning team also won any money won in the stock market. The last mission would be for the right to keep the money collected in the pot, an additional cash prize and a car. This season also featured an additional challenge where the two teams had to give up smoking for the duration of filming. If any cast member on either team were caught smoking, their cast would lose the additional challenge.

== Cast ==
Ms. Big: Gladys Sanabria from Road Rules: Latin America

Real World team
Player	Original season
Amaya Brecher	The Real World: Hawaii
David Burns	The Real World: Seattle
Heather Gardner	The Real World: New York
Kat Ogden	The Real World: London
Mike Lambert	The Real World: Miami
Tecumshea "Teck" Holmes III	The Real World: Hawaii

Road Rules team
Player	Original season
Carlos "Los" Jackson	Road Rules: USA – The First Adventure
Dan Setzler	Road Rules: Northern Trail
Holly Shand	Road Rules: Latin America
Piggy Thomas	Road Rules: Down Under
Veronica Portillo	Road Rules: Semester at Sea
Yes Duffy	Road Rules: Semester at Sea

== Gameplay ==
=== Challenges ===
- Stratos-Fear: Each team member must bungee jump from the Stratosphere Tower. The team with the most members to jump wins.
- Demolition Derby: Teams compete in a demolition derby where each team has three cars, each with one driver and passenger. The drivers attempt to hit opposing team's cars until they can no longer operate, while avoiding having their own car get hit. Meanwhile, the passengers are equipped with paint guns and attempt to spray opposing drivers to distact them. The last team standing wins.
- Wheel of Wrestling: Each team member spins a wheel to determine their opponent for a wrestling match, with potential opponents including professional wrestlers, model wrestlers, "mini wrestlers" or a member of the other team. The team with the most members to win their matchup wins the mission.
- Snake Wrangling: Teams attempt to catch as many live snakes as possible and put them in a bag. The team with the most snakes after three rounds wins.
- Redneck Games: Teams compete in the Redneck Games, where the team that scores the most points wins. First, contestants race to catch greased pigs place them in a pen. Second, contestants attempt to eat a pie in five minutes, without using their hands. Third, contestants bob for pigs' feet. Finally, contestants belly flop into a mud pit, with points awarded by judges.
- Mud Football: Teams compete against each other in a game of football in a mudpit.
- Swamp Buggy Racing: Relay style, each team member must drive a swamp buggy around a course. The first team to finish wins.
- Homemade Swimsuit Contest: Each team forms three male-female pairs. Each pair must create a homemade swimsuits and model them in a contest at the Hog's Breath Saloon the following night, to be scored by six judges. The team with the most points overall wins.
- Stir Crazy: Each team must spend 48 hours in a padded cell, and keep a ball continuously moving while inside. Before entering, teams are given $60 to purchase items. Teams forfeit the mission if a team member leaves the cell, or their ball stops moving. The team that lasts the longest wins.
- Handsome Reward: Each team member completes a solo skydive and attempts to land in the bullseye area on the ground worth 100 points, with point values decreasing with each surrounding zone. The team with the most overall points wins.

== Game summary ==
Episodes		Mission outcome	
#	Challenge	Winners	Losers
1	Stratos-Fear	Completed (Note: There was no official winner for this mission, as both teams completed the task.)	
2	Demolition Derby	Real World	Road Rules
3	Wheel of Wrestling	Real World	Road Rules
4	Snake Wrangling	Road Rules	Real World
5	Redneck Games	Road Rules	Real World
6	Mud Football	Road Rules	Real World
7	Swamp Buggy Racing	Road Rules	Real World
9	Homemade Swimsuit Contest	Real World	Road Rules
10	Stir Crazy	Road Rules	Real World
11	Handsome Reward	Road Rules	Real World

Real World
Road Rules

=== Mini challenges ===
Episode		Mission Results		Prize
#	Challenge	Winners	Losers	Prize
2	Tobacco Free	—N/a (Note: No team was declared the winner of the addition "Tobacco Free" challenge, as David and Piggy were caught smoking.)		$6,000
4	Scavenger Hunt (Note: In this episode, the Road Rules team won an additional "mini-challenge" that involved the cast completing various tasks such as kissing a cow on the face and dressing in drag and giving out autographs. The Road Rules team completed their tasks faster than the Real World team and thus won $6,000.)	Road Rules	Real World	$6,000

=== Final results ===
- Road Rules won the final challenge, winning brand new 2000 Nissan Xterras. They earned $60,000, while also winning $6,000 in the "Scavenger Hunt" mini-challenge and an additional $1,524 through their E-trade online investment, for a total bank of $67,524 with each team member receiving $11,254.
- Real World earned $40,000, while also winning an additional $985 through their E-trade online investment, for a total bank of 40,985 with each team member receiving $6,830.
- Both teams lost the additional "Tobacco Free" challenge as Heather and David were caught smoking. Heather brought a camera man to the girls' bathroom at an RV park to catch Piggy smoking and David fully admitted to smoking during the challenge.

== Teams ==
Demolition Derby (Ep. 2)
Amaya & Kat	Dan & Holly
David & Mike	Los & Piggy
Heather & Teck	Veronica & Yes

Snake Wrangling (Ep. 4)
Kat & Teck	Dan & Los
Amaya & Mike	Holly & Piggy
David & Heather	Veronica & Yes

Homemade Swimsuit Contest (Ep. 9)
Amaya & Mike
Piggy & Los
Heather & Teck
Veronica & Yes
David & Kat
Dan & Holly

== Memorable moments ==
- The Real World team organized a fake mission to trick the Road Rules team while they were in Miami. They created a scavenger hunt, asked someone to present it, and convinced a reluctant Road Rules team to complete the mission; items on the list were to get buried in the sand, polish an old man's toes, and give someone a makeover at Sephora. Meanwhile, the Real Worlders partied in South Beach. The next morning, the Real Worlders revealed the truth, and presented the prize, a "box of suckers".

== Episodes ==
No. overall	No. in season	Title	Original release date
12	1	"Stratos-Fear"	January 17, 2000
The new crop of Real World and Road Rules teams arrive in Las Vegas in front of the Stratosphere Tower, where they are greeted by Road Rules: Latin America cast member Gladys Sanabria, who informs them they will be competing for $100,000. Their first mission is to bungee jump from the stratosphere tower. Before Teck, Veronica, and Kat can jump, high force winds forces production to shut down until the next day. Teck annoys some of his cast members for partying the whole night and showing up to the challenge late. Nevertheless, the remaining cast members also jump from the tower with Kat breaking the world record at 700 feet.
13	2	"Demolition Derby"	January 24, 2000
The cast is greeted by boxer Roy Jones Jr. and are told they would be given their next clue if they defeat him in the boxing ring. As it turns out, the "boxing" game is actually a toy game and despite losing, they still get their clue and are told to go to Tennessee. Heather establishes herself as leader of the Real World team. The teams are told that their next mission is competing in a demolition derby. During the mission, a determined Real World team easily defeats the Road Rules team. Amaya ends up having to be checked out by medical when she inhales too much smoke from the cars, but is cleared to continue. The next day, teams are given instructions for a mini-challenge, in which they will win an additional $6,000 if they remain tobacco free; this upsets Piggy, who is the only one on her team that smokes. David also struggles to stop smoking. Later that night, Heather exposes Piggy to production that she has been smoking.
14	3	"Wheel of Wrestling"	January 31, 2000
The teams are given their next clue. Los annoys some of his teammates for being cheap with his money. The teams head out to a gym where they are taught by a teacher how to wrestle with each other. The teams head to The Paladium to compete against each other. The next mission is "Wheel of Wrestling", where a wheel determines the match-up. Austin Powers actor Verne Troyer makes an appearance as host. Despite valiant efforts by the Road Rules team, Real World ends up winning 7 to 5. Los starts to feel isolated from the group and ends up leaving for a walk after getting into an argument with Piggy and Veronica over pizza.
15	4	"Snake Wrangling"	February 7, 2000
Team morale is low for Road Rules and Los is still missing. He returns the next day after cooling off. Meanwhile, spirits are high for Real World as they begin to get cocky over their consecutive wins. The cast is paid a visit by Piggy's former castmate Kefla Hare and are told they will be wrangling over 200 snakes for their next mission. Amaya rubs Veronica the wrong way for her cockiness and for kicking the snakes away from Road Rules. Road Rules ends up beating the other team easily. In a mini challenge, the teammates are instructed to perform a series of tasks in order to earn an additional $6,000. The Real World team begins to crumble when their losing streak causes frustration while the Road Rules team begins to bond more.
16	5	"Redneck Games"	February 14, 2000
Amaya's personality begins to annoy some of her teammates. The teams are given their next clue and are informed that they will be competing in the Redneck Games. Heather and David get angry when the Road Rules team appears to cheat during the pie-eating contest. The referee seems to acknowledge this but says similar cheating on the part of Real World balanced everything out. Amaya throws a fit over having to bob for pigs feet as it's against her religion, further annoying her teammates. She ends up doing the challenge anyway, but Road Rules is still declared the winner. Morale for Road Rules is considerably higher while the Real World team continues to bicker.
17	6	"Mud Football"	February 21, 2000
The cast prepares to compete in mud football. Real World continues to bicker with each other due to their consecutive losses. Piggy calls her boyfriend and ends up getting into an argument with him. Amaya's whining continues to annoy Heather. The cast members arrive at a football field and are greeted by professional football players. Despite Piggy's lack of athleticism, Road Rules easily defeats the Real World team. Amaya has to step out of the challenge because she was bruised. The Real World team becomes even more sulky over their losses.
18	7	"Swamp Buggy Racing"	February 28, 2000
David bonds with the Road Rules girls while Holly and Dan begin to get closer to one another, with Holly admitting she is attracted to him. The teams arrive at their next mission and are told they will be competing in a swamp buggy race. Heather worries that her inability to drive a stick shift will cost them the mission. Amaya falls ill from food poisoning. David's competitiveness begins to annoy some of his teammates as the teams begin their competition. Road Rules once again defeats Real World, due to Amaya and Heather not knowing how to drive stick. David gets frustrated with his team on their losing streak, which angers Heather. The teams later head to a Sister Hazel concert where they're allowed to sing on stage. Holly finds out Dan has a girlfriend, but respects his boundaries.
19	8	"Sweet Revenge"	March 6, 2000
Bitter with their losing streak, the Real World team decides to play a prank on the other team. Los continues to isolate himself from his teammates with his rudeness and standoffish personality. The Road Rules team is presented with another mini challenge in the form of a scavenger hunt. However, it is actually the prank the Real World had planned and they would be partying while the other team did the task. Road Rules has issues with the tasks, but a competitive Holly encourages the team to do the mission, which is taxing for them. Los and Veronica get into an argument with one another and Los walks off. Veronica apologizes and the team completes the mission. The next morning, the Real World team gives the Road Rules team a shoebox of candy and reveals that the scavenger hunt was all a prank; this angers several members, especially Veronica, who feels like her relationship with Los worsened because of the mini challenge.
20	9	"Homemade Swimsuit Contest"	March 13, 2000
Piggy and Los begin to bicker at each other over Los's racist comments. David decides to confront Amaya over her challenge performances. The teams are given a clue for their next mission and are told they will be competing in a homemade swimsuit contest. An excited Amaya takes the lead in the challenge. The Road Rules team struggles to come up with a cohesive theme while the Real World team manages to work together without bickering. Los continues to rub his teammates the wrong way. The Real World team finally breaks Road Rules losing streak after Piggy & Los bomb their round in the swimsuit contest. Later that night, Piggy and Los appear to get into a physical confrontation, which forces Los to leave for a hotel.
21	10	"Stir Crazy"	March 27, 2000
Dan goes to talk to Los, hoping to convince him to return. The teams get their new clues and are instructed to get to Southeastern University and meet a psychologist. The teams are told they would be locked in padded rooms for 48 hours and must keep a ball moving at all times. They're also told that if any cast members leave, their team is disqualified, which draws concerns from Road Rules about Los's dedication. After lasting 34 hours, David costs the Real World team the mission when he falls asleep while holding the ball, allowing it to stop for 20 seconds. Meanwhile, the Road Rules team cleverly set up a contraption that allowed the ball to move with the air conditioning system while the team gets to sleep. Los tries his best to bond with his team, and things between the Road Rules team appear to be more positive.
22	11	"Handsome Reward"	April 3, 2000
The teams gather for dinner the night before the final mission. Amaya and Veronica continue their feud. At the final mission, the teams arrive at the airport and it's revealed that their handsome rewards are 2000 Nissa Xterras. They are told that their final mission is solo sky diving and they will have to land within a dartboard. Amaya injures herself after the wind blows her off course, but it turns out it was only a sprained ankle and slight concussion. Road Rules wins the final mission and the SUVs and an additional $67,524 from their winnings in previous missions. Meanwhile, Real World makes $40,985 from their winnings. Despite their rivalries, the Real World and Road Rules teams leave in good spirits while the cast reflects on their adventures together during the challenge.
