= The Real World: London =

Coordinates: 51°31′02″N 00°12′05″W

- Season 4
- The cast of The Real World: London
- Starring: Kat Ogden; Neil Forrester; Jacinda Barrett; Jay Frank; Lars Schlichting; Michael Johnson; Sharon Gitau
- No. of episodes: 23

Release
- Original network: MTV
- Original release: June 28 – November 15, 1995

Season chronology
- ← Previous; The Real World: San Francisco Next → The Real World: Miami

The Real World: London is the fourth season of MTV's reality television series The Real World, which focuses on a group of diverse strangers living together for several months in a different city each season, as cameras follow their lives and interpersonal relationships. It is the only season of The Real World to be filmed in the United Kingdom.

The season featured seven people and is the first of four seasons of The Real World to be filmed entirely outside of the United States, being followed by The Real World: Paris in 2003, The Real World: Sydney in 2007, The Real World: Cancun in 2009.

The cast moved into the Notting Hill Gate flat in January 1995, and lived there for five months, moving out in mid-June. The season premiered on June 28 of that year, and was viewed by 2.7 million people. The season consisted of 23 episodes.

Regarding following the emotional high points provided by the struggles of Pedro Zamora and David "Puck" Rainey the previous season, series co-creator Jon Murray stated, "In terms of big dramatic issues, there's no way we could match that. So this year plays on more of a Moonlighting, romantic-comedy kind of feel." The most notable event of the season occurs when cast member and singer Neil Forrester kisses a male heckler during a performance, who then bites the tip of Forrester's tongue off. This event earned Forrester a place among other reality television personalities who have been injured during filming on MTV's 2008 "E.R. All-Stars". The season also features a guest appearance by Blues Traveler, whose lead singer, John Popper, dedicates a song to cast member Jay Frank, an aspiring playwright and fan of the band.

== Season changes ==
This is the first season of The Real World to be set outside the United States. The cast is also the only cast to be predominately made up of non-Americans, with three Americans, two Britons, a German and an Australian.

== The residence ==
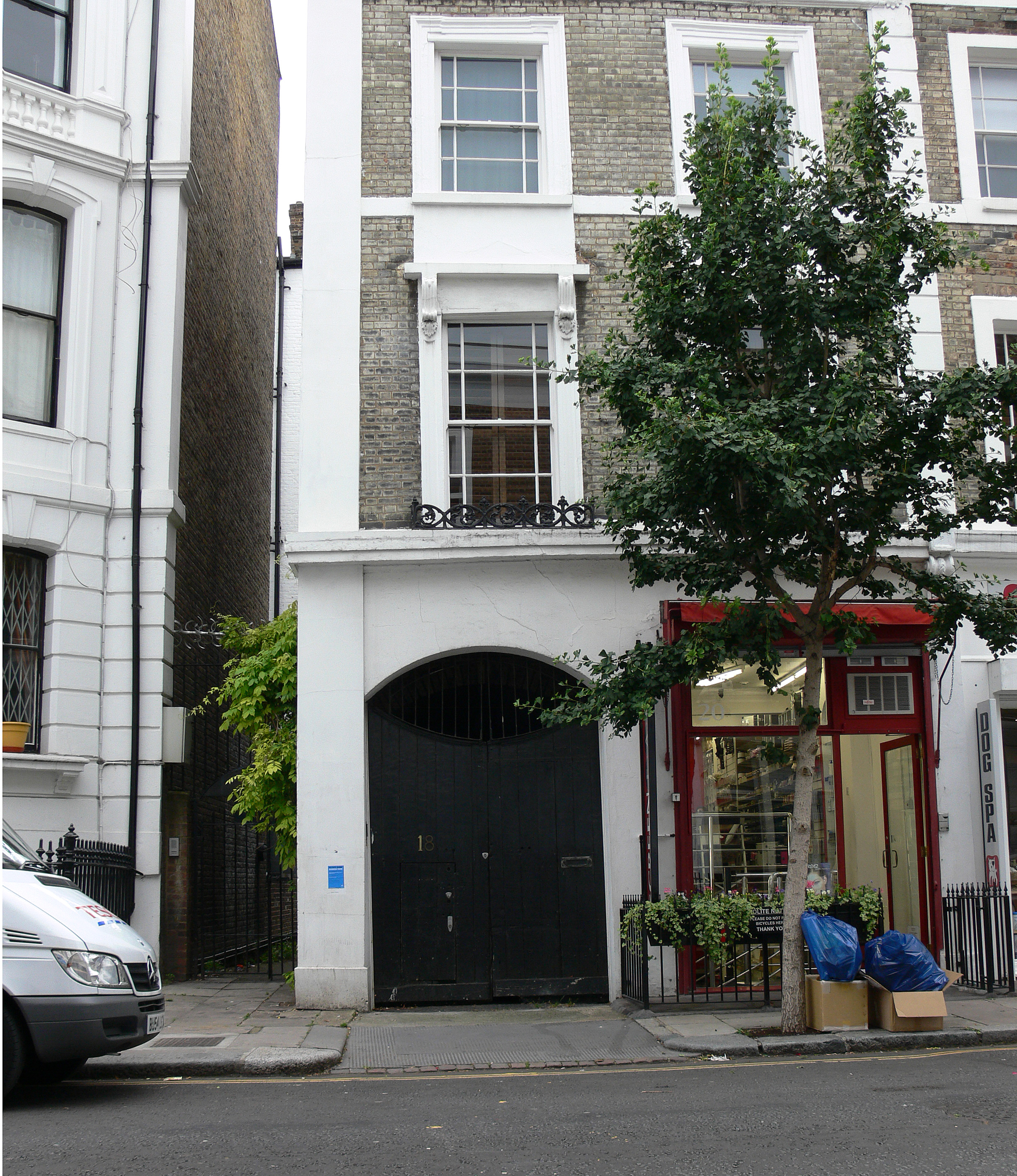
The Powis Terrace flat where the cast resided.

The cast lived in a 6,000-square-foot, three-story, four bedroom, renovated townhouse at 18 Powis Terrace in the trendy Notting Hill neighbourhood of London. The ground floor of the building is leased to ScreenFace, a professional make-up supply company.

== Cast ==
Producers considered 25,000 applicants for casting. The seven selected were not well-acquainted with the series. The two American men chosen to help appease the home audience, Jay Frank and Mike Johnson, were not impressed with what little they had seen of it, with Johnson relating that he channel-surfed past it, saying, "This is stupid. I want videos." Entertainment Weekly's Bruce Fretts says that this ignorance precluded them from aping the behavior of past seasons' casts.

Cast member	Age (Note: Age at the time of filming.)	Hometown
Kat Ogden	19	Yelm, Washington
Kat, who is one of four children, was born on Kodiak Island, Alaska, where her father, Fred, works as a commercial fisherman. Her mother, Margaret, is a freelance writer. Her family settled in Yelm, Washington when she was eight, and she credits her parents with stressing education, saying, "For years we didn't have a couch. But there was always enough money for books." At age 11 she took up fencing, following in the footsteps of her grandfather, a 1930s feature film stunt fighter, an ability that earned her an academic scholarship to New York University, where she is currently a sophomore majoring in anthropology, and fencing on the varsity team. During her stay in London she attends Richmond Adult Community College on a semester abroad program, and participates in the Junior Olympics in San Jose, California. She has read accounts that describe her as "applecheeked and bubbly", but insists that she has "a hard, cynical streak". She is excited about the cultural differences that await her in London. Although Mike perceives romantic feelings between her and Neil (who is in a long-term relationship with another woman), Kat denies any physical relationship with Neil, and is offended about Mike speaking about her and Neil outside of her presence, claiming that their mutual attraction was blown out of proportion. However, in an interview conducted subsequent to the season's completion, Jay accused the pair of "[trying] to hide it from the cameras" and commented that "the directors got all pissed off about it. It brought an uncomfortable element to the house", with Mike adding his opinion that "[they both] lied to all of us". Kat expresses an occasional loneliness, and finds it difficult to meet new people because she fears that she makes poor first impressions, and doesn't like herself when she's in a relationship.
Neil Forrester	24	Oxford, England
Neil is a graduate of Oxford University's Wadham College, and is taking time off from his Ph.D. studies in experimental psychology to play with his band, a "techno-noise" band called Unilever, of which he is the lead singer. He is also "keeps his options open" by being involved with a couple of other bands, and wishes to show that one can take an "intellectual" approach to music. Described as "super-cynical", he concedes to being both misanthropic and xenophobic, and that this makes it difficult for him to meet new people. He also says he dislikes America, remarking that he finds that Americans' upfront friendliness "smacks of insincerity", and that Americans "demolish all semblance of culture. It's interesting in the same way car crashes are interesting." These feelings are underlined by his relationship with Mike, whom Neil perceives to have a "brash temperament" typical of the aspects of the United States that he dislikes. He nonetheless comes to like Mike, though he becomes closest to Lars, more so than Mike and Jay. An advocate of body piercing, the hardest part of filming is the separation from his girlfriend, Chrys, and the prospect of sharing a room. Sharon relates that Neil likes to play mind games with people, and provoke them in order to see their reaction. In Episode 7, Neil responds to a drunken male heckler during a Unilever performance by leaning over and French kissing him. In response, the heckler bites the tip of Neil's tongue off, requiring 15 stitches to sew it back on, earning Neil a place among other reality television personalities who have been injured during filming on MTV's 2008 "E.R. All-Stars". Neil subsequently spends a portion of the season communicating during his "confessionals" using a computer voice synthesizer and through Chrys' recollections.
Jay Frank	19	Portland, Oregon
Jay, described as "the quietest, least active one" in the cast, is an aspiring playwright and actor. His parents, Linda and Greg Streight, divorced before he was two. He was adopted by his stepfather, Scott Frank, a management consultant, when Jay was in the seventh grade, but Jay's biological father opposed Jay taking his stepfather's surname, and took Jay to court and cross-examined him himself, which Jay relates as a "strange" experience. He remains somewhat estranged from his biological father, and receives a surprise letter from him from Saudi Arabia in Episode 13. Described by Real World producer-director George Verschoor as "a sensitive Jimmy Stewart type", Jay wrote a one-man show, Bedroom, about an insomniac teenager with an extremely active imagination, when he was a senior at Grant High School, for which he was named a Presidential Scholars Program by Bill Clinton at a White House ceremony. He decided to move to London to visit the theater scene, and hopes to write his next play and continue his education in drama school. He is very close to his family, and has a 16-year-old girlfriend named Alicia. Some of his housemates come to believe that Jay makes little use of his opportunities while in London, which earns him the label "slacker". He explains says that his tourist visa prevents him from either working or doing volunteer work. As a result, he puts on a presentation of Bedroom in the flat for friends in Episode 13. Though this earns him accolades from his friends, they continue to feel he does not make productive use of his time in London afterwards. By Episode 16, the change he feels he has undergone makes him ambivalent about his visit home to Portland and his relationship with Alicia.
Mike Johnson	21	St. Louis, Missouri
Mike is a business-marketing major at Westminster College and a race car driver from a wealthy family who races Formula 2000 cars at Gateway International Raceway. Mike was introduced to the sport by his father, Duke, who runs a company that manufactures food-service equipment, but who races on the side. Mike's mother, Terry, who divorced Duke when Mike was two, does sales for a paint company. Despite the offer from his father to race with his team of seven years, Mike prefers to find his own sponsors in London, where he tries racing Formula Renault. Although he has been to Europe once before, he has never been to England. Though he is looking forward to the trip, he chafes against his father's opposition to the trip (though his father denies being unsupportive of him) and his words of caution, perceiving it as part of his father's typical negativity. He is also ambivalent about exploiting his father's connections. His family includes a younger brother and sister, his stepmother, Kathy, and his half-brother, Duke, Jr., the latter two of which visit London with Mike's father in Episode 9. He is unbothered by Neil and Jacinda's observations that he is conspicuously American, refusing to adopt a Europhilic attitude while in London, and is surprised by the realization that Britons are not as universally enamored of Americans as he perceived them to be via the American media, but finds himself experiencing reverse culture shock when he returns home to visit his family in Episode 20, having acclimated to England. Mike gravitates to Kat in the beginning of the season, but subsequently feels excluded by the romantic tension between her and Neil. Responding to the accusation that this was motivated by jealousy, he stated in an interview, "I'm not attracted to [Kat] in the slightest", with Kat also referring to the suggestion that Mike had a crush on her as being "rubbish". Mike also becomes close to Jay, the only other male American in the house, and because their activities in London are limited, the two are known to sleep in the day and spend nights engaging in antics that sometimes anger others such as Jacinda.
Lars Schlichting	24	Berlin, Germany
Lars works for an event and marketing agency while attending the University of Berlin, where he studies communications and North American studies. He spends his nights deejaying at techno clubs and enjoying the nightlife. He also does promotional work for 98.8 KISS FM Berlin. He hopes to work for a club, record label or public relations firm while staying in London. Remarking on his line of work, he says, "There's not a lot of good German house DJs. I'm the first German who's ever spun on a Saturday at [London's] Ministry of Sound". Though Neil becomes the closest to him, Neil questions Lars' direct approach to expressing himself, as when Lars reacts to the cast's apathy over the theft of his mountain bike from the flat's foyer, which the two discuss during the trip to Africa.
Jacinda Barrett	22	Brisbane, Australia
Jacinda has been a professional model since the age of 14, and left her native Australia at 17 to pursue that career internationally. She lives in Paris, is represented by the Storm modeling agency (which also represents Elle Macpherson and Kate Moss), and continues her career while in London, having been featured in many top fashion magazines in Europe. She is also pursuing her pilot's license and a certification in parachuting, and says that she has "a million" career goals she would like to accomplish, commenting, "Modeling is great money and great travel, but I just find it really empty, so I can't continue doing it full-time. I would do my head in". Sharon nicknames Jacinda "Ms. Mischief" for her spontaneous, "cheeky" way of horsing around with people and provoking them. Among the antics with which Jacinda amuses herself are pinching strange men's rear ends on the London Underground in order to get a reaction out of them, prank calling total strangers and streaking outside the flat with Kat. She has a boyfriend named Paul who is also a model, though she observes in the premiere that they've been together for less time than she'll be in London. In Episode 8, she adopts a Shih Tzu dog she names Legend. She is described by Mike as "free-spirited", in contrast to Paul, two years her junior, who Mike feels is less outgoing and the submissive one in their relationship. Lars, who is opposed to her adoption of Legend, finds it frivolous, comparing her desire for a dog to a little girl's desire for a Barbie doll. Sharon, who addresses Jacinda as "Jacy", becomes irritated at Jacinda when the unhousebroken Legend's soils her room, as does the cast in general with her lack of consideration for other people, which comes out in Episode 10 and during the group's Outward Bound camping weekend in Episode 11. Neil and Mike say that although she is fundamentally a nice person, and that they like her very much when she is alone with one of them, that she undergoes a dramatic change when more than one person is around, exhibiting behavior they find abhorrent, which Neil speculates may stem from the fact that she has not had a normal life since age 14.
Sharon Gitau	20	Essex, England
Sharon is a singer/songwriter who performs with a jazz funk band. She is a fan of performers such as Hue & Cry, U2, Tori Amos, Leslie Garrett and Enya. She is very close to her mother (who appears in Episodes 4 and 15), who raised her as an only child. She is also an experienced traveler, having found the U.S. particularly enjoyable. MTV describes her as "an affable young woman who was looking for something new in her life before she went on the show". The others perceive her to be very talkative, which proves to be a problem in Episode 4, when she is required to remain silent following surgery that removes a swollen growth on her tonsils that threatens her singing. She becomes to be a target for teasing from the rest of the cast. When the cast goes on a group vacation to Kenya, Sharon, a vegetarian, expresses discomfort at the Maasai slaughtering a goat for dinner. During that trip, the cast asks her about her tendency to hold back much about her singing and her relationships, and she attributes this to a number of formative influences, including being raised an only child by her mother, attending an all-girls school, and lacking any father figure, as the closest male family members were an uncle and grandfather whom she only saw once a year, due to their living in the United States. As a result, she was not used to being around men, and due to this and some negative experiences in her youth, it took her a long time to feel comfortable with her sexuality and herself.

== Episodes ==
No. overall	No. in season	Title	Original release date
55	1	"Moving in London, Part 1"	June 28, 1995
Jay flies to Phoenix and then New York, where he meets Kat, before they both fly to London. Lars, the only smoker in the house, is advised not to smoke, because it is considered antisocial in England, whereas Mike's father tells him that everyone smokes in England. Mike and Sharon get to know one another on the drive from the airport to the Notting Hill loft. Jacinda flies in from Paris, while the self-described misanthrope and xenophobe Neil, who finds it difficult to meet new people, wonders what his flatmates will be like. The cast assembles at the flat, and shares their first dinner.
56	2	"Moving in London, Part 2"	June 28, 1995
The cast settles into the flat, continuing to get to know one another, and experiencing London. Jay's mentor since the 7th grade is in town, and shows him around London's theater district. The cast discusses their future romantic and sexual prospects. Kat considers her curriculum at Richmond College, and gets to know Neil and his girlfriend of five years, Chrys. Mike, however, who felt he was becoming good friends with Kat, believes that she and Neil are becoming an item, and resents what he perceives their secrecy about it, while simultaneously denying any romantic feelings for Kat himself. Kat similarly insists that she is merely friends with Neil, and objects to Mike's gossip.
57	3	"A Loaf of Bread, a Jug of Swine ..."	July 4, 1995
U.S.-British differences are underlined by the conflict between Neil, who likes to play mind games with people, and who finds Mike's brash temperament typical of the aspects of the United States that he dislikes, and Mike's steadfast patriotism and nationalism, and his perception of Neil's self-portrayed intellectualism. Kat and Neil continue to feel a mutual attraction, but resolve not to let it threaten Neil's relationship with Chrys, which has been rocky for the past six months. On Valentine's Day, Jacinda receives roses from her boyfriend, Paul, while Neil is disturbed to receive a pig's heart with a nail through it surrounded by white roses from Chrys. Neil dedicates a song to the cast during a performance that they attend, though Jay, Lars and Mike find the song impenetrable.
58	4	"Shush, Shush, Sweet Sharon"	July 12, 1995
Lars continues his club promotions, and bonds with Sharon over their mutual interest in music, though he and others come into conflict with her over her use of the phone and the accompanying phone bill. Sharon also deals with a growth in her throat that threatens her singing and requires surgery, while Lars injures himself after an illness causes him to pass out.
59	5	"Brand New Swords and Formula Fords"	July 19, 1995
Mike looks for racing sponsors, and is ambivalent about asking for help from his father, who has been in racing for seven years, despite his father's offer to have Mike race with his team. Kat remedies her homesickness by speaking with her mother, and resumes fencing, in which she has atrophied.
60	6	"Model Employees"	July 26, 1995
Sharon gets a waitress job, while Jacinda has a casting interview, but both of them are unfulfilled by the experiences. A bored Mike and Jay, who have little to do in London, sleep during the day and engage in nighttime antics that anger Jacinda. Mike gets a job teaching inline skating, while Sharon tries her hand at being a salesperson.
61	7	"Speaking Parts"	August 2, 1995
Jay is daunted by the idea of writing a second play, and his lack of motivation earns him the label of "slacker" from the others. During a performance, Neil kisses a male heckler, who bites the tip of Neil's tongue off, requiring it to be stitched back on. The cast attends a performance of Blues Traveler, whose lead singer, John Popper, dedicates a song to fan Jay, later inviting him and the cast to an afterparty.
62	8	"Hounds of Love"	August 9, 1995
Mike, who hasn't been a relationship in some time, and is shy around women, tries his hand at dating. Jacinda's boyfriend of five months, Paul, comes to visit, during which she notes how they want different things from their relationship. Jacinda also adopts a little dog named Legend, much to the reservations of her housemates.
63	9	"Innocents Abroad"	August 16, 1995
Mike's family visits, and though Mike continues to look for sponsors, he is troubled by his father's belief (while simultaneously conceding it may have merit) that Mike is not doing enough with his time in London, and needs to find other things to fall back on. He nonetheless finds himself getting along better with his father than ever before. Jay's first love and good friend, a fellow writer named Marisa, visits from Teaneck, New Jersey, which Lars feels brings out the best in Jay.
64	10	"Disfunction Junction"	August 23, 1995
As the novelty of being in the Real World house has now worn off, Neil observes that "the honeymoon is over", with Mike, Jay and Lars angered over not getting money from the others for the phone bill, Sharon irritated by having to clean up after Jacinda's not-yet-housebroken dog, and Lars' outrage at the cast's apathy over his mountain bike being stolen from the house. They attempt to resolve this with Slam, a game in which criticisms of each housemate are written down anonymously and read out loud, though Jay abstains from this.
65	11	"Outward Bonding"	August 30, 1995
The cast is sent on a weekend camping trip with Outward Bound, where Sharon faces her fears during a ropes course, as well as the topic of her being a target of the others' teasing. The cast also talks to Jacinda about her lack of consideration.
66	12	"Fast Company"	September 6, 1995
Jacinda continues her pilot's training, and conducts her first solo flight. Mike's father loans him money for a racecar, after which Mike participates in a qualifying race at Brands Hatch. Although Mike does not place as high as he wanted, he receives support from the cast, who comes out to see him race.
67	13	"The Play's the Thing"	September 13, 1995
Because Jay is on a tourist visa, he cannot put on his play, Bedroom in a commercial venue. On Mike's suggestion, he puts on a show of Bedroom in the flat for friends.
68	14	"Unexpected Developments"	September 20, 1995
The cast throws a party for friends, during which Lars deejays, Neil sings, and a drunken Mike becomes amorous with multiple women, including Jacinda and Kat. Mike and Kat both spend time dating, though Kat, who talks about her loneliness, expresses difficulty with meeting new people and being in relationships.
69	15	"Oral Examinations"	September 27, 1995
Sharon deals with the consequences of her truancy at work, the continued remarks at her expense by the cast, and a serious bout of tonsillitis that puts her in the hospital. Kat nervously struggles to maintain the grades necessary to get into a university. Jacinda seeks to remedy Kat's depression by buying her a kitten.
70	16	"Homebodies and Free Spirits"	October 4, 1995
Jay goes home to Portland for a visit, and wonders about how the changes he has gone through affect his relationship with his girlfriend, Alicia. Jacinda relieves her boredom by streaking outside the flat with Kat, prank calling total strangers and getting her tongue pierced. Neil and Mike discuss how Jacinda's behavior varies between amenable and abhorrent, and the formative influences that contributed to this. When Jay returns to the flat, Mike and Sharon talk to him about how they feel is wasting his time in London.
71	17	"Tales from the Confessional"	October 11, 1995
In this episode, which makes larger use of clips from the Confessional, members of the cast reveal personal details, anecdotes and thoughts. Jacinda speaks to a fundamentalist Christian street preacher who calls Muslim bystanders "demons". Sharon tries to get Lars and Jay to meditate. Neil, Jay and Kat have a disagreement over American politics.
72	18	"Words of Love"	October 19, 1995
Neil and Kat are offended by Mike's casual way of referring to women as "bitches", and although he means it ironically, he resolves to stop using it. Lars, who has not had a serious relationship since 1992, spends time with a woman named Jeanette. Kat spends time with a man named Spencer, and Mike with an attractive set of twins, one of whom he pursues in particular, though the cast is skeptical of his stated platonic intentions.
73	19	"Clubs, Pubs and Dubs"	October 25, 1995
Sharon tries to resume her singing for the first time since her surgery, but her band suffers a major setback. Since his music is not paying the rent, Neil looks for a data entry job, though he also enters a CD of his band's music into a competition. Lars tries to meet more promoters, and the cast attends an event he deejays.
74	20	"There Is No Place Like Home...is...There"	November 1, 1995
Mike returns home for a visit, and for a race at Gateway International Raceway that he hopes will redeem his poor performance at Brands Hatch. Jacinda goes to Milan for a photoshoot, where she becomes uncomfortable with what she is asked to wear. After Mike wins his race, he returns to England, where he places ninth in a race.
75	21	"Into Africa"	November 8, 1995
The cast is sent on a group trip to Kenya, where they enjoy a safari, and visit a tribe of Maasai warriors, each group experiencing aspects of the other's culture. Mike feels that he is intruding into their culture when they are present at a Maasai wedding ceremony, while the vegetarian Sharon is offended at the slaughter of a goat for dinner.
76	22	"Out of Africa...and Outta Here!"	November 15, 1995
Concluding from the previous episode, Sharon sequesters herself from the others during a meal for which the Maasai slaughtered a goat, and though she understands and respects the Maasai's reasons for it, she fasts in memory of the animal. The cast experiences a "truce", as they open up about their personal feelings about one another, and Sharon discusses the formative experiences that molded her social vulnerability. After the cast enjoys a tranquil balloon ride, they exchange heartfelt testimonials and certificates of accomplishment with one another.
77	23	"London...Outta Here"	November 15, 1995
As the cast prepares to move out, Neil and Mike reflect on how much they've come to like one another despite Neil's initial prejudices, and ponder their futures and those of the others. Kat and Sharon attend an intimate variety showcase in which Kat reads her poetry. On their final night, the cast celebrates Kat's twentieth birthday, which includes a final dinner that ends in a dessert food fight, before sharing emotional good-byes the next day.

== After filming ==
At the 2008 The Real World Awards Bash, Jacinda received a nomination for "Hottest Female".

Neil Forrester became a researcher and academic in England specializing in the field of developmental disorders and language at the University of London.

Jay Frank graduated from City College of New York with a degree in Broadcast Journalism. He subsequently became a morning live reporter and then a morning anchor in the Tri-Cities, Washington area before becoming the main anchor for KOHD-TV in Bend, Oregon. He wrote another play, Ten Cent Treasure, which plays locally in the Tri-Cities area. He then began work at a Pasco, Washington television station KEPR as a weatherman and occasional morning anchor, with his own Tuesday segment "Will it work?"

Mike Johnson and his wife, Cheryl, run a real estate business. Mike is also the team manager for the Stevenson Motorsports Grand-Am road racing team.

Lars Schlichting lives in the United States, and runs his own company that deals with DJ equipment. He is also a nationwide consultant and trainer for Pioneer ProDJ.

Jacinda Barrett went on to become a feature film actress, appearing in such films as The Namesake, The Human Stain, and The Last Kiss. In 2004 she married actor Gabriel Macht. On August 20, 2007 she gave birth to a daughter, Geraldine Macht, in Los Angeles.

Sharon Gitau works as a singer, songwriter, composer and producer.

=== The Challenge ===
Cast member	Seasons of The Challenge
Jacinda Barrett	—N/a
Jay Frank	—N/a
Kat Ogden	Challenge 2000
Lars Schlichting	—N/a
Mike Johnson	Battle of the Seasons (2002)
Neil Forrester	Challenge
Sharon Gitau	Battle of the Seasons (2002)
