= Road Rules: Latin America =

- Season 7
- Starring: Abe Ingersoll; Brian Lancaster; Gladys Sanabria; Holly Shand; Josh Florence; Sarah Martinez
- No. of episodes: 15

Release
- Original network: MTV
- Original release: January 29 – April 26, 1999

Season chronology
- ← Previous; Road Rules: Down Under Next → Road Rules: Semester at Sea

Road Rules: Latin America is the seventh season of the MTV reality television series Road Rules. It took place in Latin America in the countries of Mexico, Belize and Costa Rica, as well as the United States of America. The Handsome Reward was a Volkswagen New Beetle, which all five remaining cast members received in the finale (Sanabria was removed from the show before this point).

== Cast ==
Cast member	Age^{1}	Hometown
Abe Ingersoll	18	Venice Beach, California
Brian Lancaster	23	West Chester, Pennsylvania
Gladys Sanabria	20	Boston, Massachusetts
Holly Shand	20	Durango, Colorado
Josh Florence	21	Austin, Texas
Sarah Martinez	21	New Orleans, Louisiana

- ^Note 1: At time of filming.

== Missions ==
Mission #	Mission Name	Completed
1	Get the Key from the Beast	Completed
2	Race Against the Raramuri	Completed
3	Make your own Spaghetti Western	Completed
4	Screen your Spaghetti Western	Completed
5	Bullfighting	Completed
6	Water Craft Competition	Completed
7	Deep Sea Fishing	Completed
8	Write a Song and Perform with Molotov	Completed
9	Turn Trash into Art	Completed
10	Spider Wrangling	Completed
11	Swing Criollo Dancing	Completed
12	Sandcastle Building/Sea Kayaking	Completed
13	Recover Handsome Reward	Completed

== Episodes ==
No. overall	No. in season	Title	Original release date
88	1	"Ai Chihuahua"	January 29, 1999
89	2	"Cobwebs and Margaritas"	January 29, 1999
90	3	"Cinema Spaghettios"	February 1, 1999
91	4	"Trust"	February 8, 1999
92	5	"Fight the Bull"	February 15, 1999
93	6	"Tigers and Sharks"	February 22, 1999
94	7	"Sticks and Stones"	March 1, 1999
95	8	"Deep Sea Therapy"	March 8, 1999
96	9	"This One's for Gladys"	March 15, 1999
97	10	"Strike the Gold"	March 22, 1999
98	11	"Into the Heart of Darkness"	March 29, 1999
99	12	"Image Is Everything"	April 5, 1999
100	13	"The Renegades Strike"	April 12, 1999
101	14	"Sleepless on Snake Island"	April 19, 1999
102	15	"Handsome Reward"	April 26, 1999

== During filming ==
In Episode 6, Gladys and Abe got into a violent shouting match in the hotel over Abe’s hook-up with Susie (from Road Rules: Down Under) the previous evening. When Gladys physically attacked Abe and scratched his face, she was sent home for breach of contract.

In Episode 7, Tom Arnold and his wife made a surprise appearance taking the roadies out on their boat for a fishing “competition”. Brian caught the only fish (a small one) but over the course of the day Tom served an important role performing as mediator over the Gladys/Abe fallout and healing some of the leftover wounds.

== After filming ==
In 2011, Holly Shand married Justin Darcy. The couple has two daughters.

On March 29, 2018, Brian Lancaster died at the age of 43. Though the cause of death was not immediately confirmed, TMZ confirmed that Lancaster had a history of heart failure and arrhythmia.

=== The Challenge ===
Cast member	Seasons of The Challenge
Abe Ingersoll	—N/a
Brian Lancaster	—N/a
Gladys Sanabria	Battle of the Sexes
Holly Shand	Challenge 2000, Battle of the Seasons (2002), The Inferno
Josh Florence	Battle of the Seasons (2002)
Sarah Martinez	—N/a

Note: Gladys Sanabria served as Ms. Big on Challenge 2000
