= Neil Forrester =

British research assistant and reality television personality

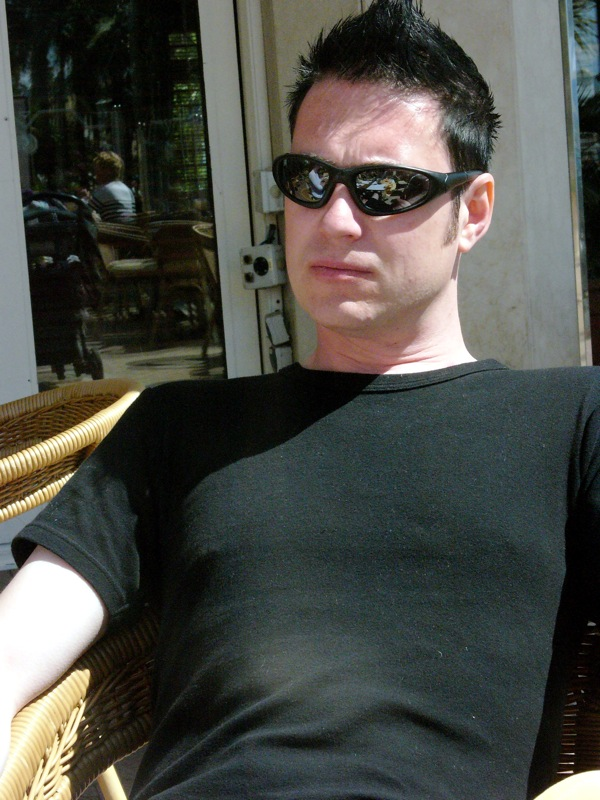
- 2005
- Born: 3 January 1971 (age 55); Keynsham, England, UK
- Occupations: Artist, Musician, Actor

Neil A. Forrester (born 3 January 1971, in Keynsham, England) is a British research assistant in the field of developmental disorders and language acquisition at the University of London and former reality television personality. He is best known to the general public as one of the cast members of the fourth season of the MTV reality television series The Real World: London, which aired in 1995. At that time he was the lead vocalist of an underground, alternative-oriented band called Unilever, which had punk and performance art leanings.

Forrester was co-founder of an online currency company called Beenz.com. He is also co-author of a number of technology patents.

In his current line of work he has written a variety of academic papers with such titles as "Learning the Arabic plural: the case for minority default mappings in connectionist networks." He has a website at neilforrester.com, but it now depicts a message simply stating "There is no neilforrester.com". It offers a link to the website shardcore.org, which currently contains an extensive collection of artwork developed under his alter ego, Shardcore.
