= Road Rules: Northern Trail =

- Season 5
- Starring: Anne Wharton; Dan Setzler; Jon Holmes; Noah Rickun; Roni Martin; Tara McDaniel
- No. of episodes: 14

Release
- Original network: MTV
- Original release: January 19 – April 13, 1998

Season chronology
- ← Previous; Road Rules: Islands Next → Road Rules: Down Under

Road Rules: Northern Trail is the fifth season of the MTV reality television series Road Rules. It took place along the northern border of the United States, often landing the cast in parts of Canada.

== Cast ==
Cast member	Age^{1}	Hometown
Anne Wharton	23	Tempe, AZ
Dan Setzler	20	Apple Valley, MN
Jon Holmes	20	Boston, MA
Noah Rickun	20	Mequon, WI
Roni Martin	18	Harlem, NY
Tara McDaniel	19	Chatsworth, CA

- ^Note 1 : At time of filming.

== Episodes ==
No. overall	No. in season	Title	Original release date
61	1	"Hello, My Name Is..."	January 19, 1998
62	2	"Club Sandwiches Not Seals"	January 19, 1998
63	3	"The Blind Leading the Blessed"	January 26, 1998
64	4	"Breaking In and Breaking Bones"	February 2, 1998
65	5	"Is That a Gun In Your Pocket, Or Are You Just Happy to See Me?"	February 9, 1998
66	6	"Roadies on the Trail"	February 16, 1998
67	7	"Go Dan!"	February 23, 1998
68	8	"Athlete's Foot"	March 2, 1998
69	9	"Afraid to Love"	March 9, 1998
70	10	"Blood and Guts"	March 16, 1998
71	11	"Fred Astaire You Ain't"	March 23, 1998
72	12	"Rat Poison"	March 30, 1998
73	13	"Picture Imperfect"	April 6, 1998
74	14	"Ice Castles"	April 13, 1998

== After filming ==
Road Rules: Northern Trail is the subject of recurring jokes on various podcasts by James Stephanie Sterling, owing to their co-host Jon Holmes having been a contestant in the series.

Roni Martin since got married and currently goes by Roni Chance. She worked as a photo editor for Hearst Communications since 2006.

Dan Setzler lives in Nashville and is focused on his music career.

=== The Challenge ===
Cast member	Seasons of The Challenge	Other appearances
Anne Wharton	Challenge, Battle of the Sexes	—N/a
Dan Setzler	Challenge 2000, Battle of the Seasons (2002), Battle of the Sexes 2	—N/a
Jon Holmes	—N/a	—N/a
Noah Rickun	Challenge	—N/a
Roni Martin	Challenge, The Gauntlet	The Challenge: All Stars (season 3)
Tara McDaniel	Battle of the Seasons (2002)	—N/a
