= The Challenge: Double Agents =

36th season of the reality television series

Double Agents
- Season 36
- Presented by: T. J. Lavin
- No. of contestants: 30
- Winners: Amber Borzotra; Chris "CT" Tamburello
- Location: Reykjavík, Iceland
- No. of episodes: 21 (including the two-part Reunion special)

Release
- Original network: MTV
- Original release: December 9, 2020 – May 5, 2021

Season chronology
- ← Previous; Total Madness Next → Spies, Lies & Allies

The Challenge: Double Agents is the 36th season of the MTV reality competition series The Challenge. This season features alumni from The Real World, Road Rules, The Challenge, Are You the One?, Big Brother, Celebrity Big Brother, the Olympics, Love Island UK, The Amazing Race, Survivor, Geordie Shore, Ex on the Beach, Shipwrecked, America's Got Talent, WWE NXT, and Ultimate Beastmaster competing for a share at a $1 million prize. The season premiered on December 9, 2020. A launch special, titled "The Challenge: Double Agents Declassified" aired on December 7, 2020.

== Format ==
Double Agents features a main challenge, a nomination process, and an elimination round. This season had players competing in male-female teams of two, initially selected among themselves at the conclusion of the opening challenge. These teams frequently changed throughout the season due to the nature of the game.

- Daily Challenge: Players compete in a main challenge in pairs, where the winning team forms the Double Agents.
- Nominations: Players, besides the Double Agents, participate in nominations and must vote for one pair to participate in the elimination round. They are given a chance to discuss the nominations before voting privately and as individuals. The team who receives the most votes are "compromised" and will have the player of the designated gender compete in the elimination round.
- Double Agents: Following nominations, the Double Agents are shown the nominated team, as well as which individuals voted for them. At the Crater, the Double Agents vote for a second team to compete against the nominated team in the elimination round, where the player of the designated gender will participate. The Double Agents may also volunteer for elimination instead of voting for a team.
- Eliminations (The Crater): Following the Double Agent's votes, the gender that participates in the elimination round is disclosed. The player of the designated gender of the nominated team competes in an elimination round against the same-gender player of the team selected by the Double Agents, or the volunteer from the Double Agents. The loser is eliminated while the winner receives a Gold Skull and remains in the game.

Twists

- Gold Skull: Similar to the "Red Skull" from Total Madness, winning an elimination round earns a player a Gold Skull, a requirement to compete in the Final Challenge. There are only 10 skulls available - five for each gender. Once all five skulls are obtained for a gender, the only way to obtain a skull is to defeat a player possessing a skull in elimination.
- Rogue Agents: A player without a partner at any point in the game is classified as a Rogue Agent. Rogue Agents do not compete in the next daily challenge and are ineligible to be selected for elimination.
- Infiltration: The winner of an elimination round may select any player of the opposite gender (excluding the Double Agents) to become their partner. In the event that a player in an existing pair is chosen, their former partner either chooses a new partner between the remaining agents without a partner, pairs up with the agent without a partner, or becomes a Rogue Agent, depending on numbers.
- Security Breach: Two "Security Breach" twists were enacted throughout the season:
  - Reactivated Agent: In episode 5, eliminated contestant Ashley Mitchell returned to the competition due to the number of female medical disqualifications.
  - Double Elimination: In episode 11/12, a Double Male Elimination occurred in which two male players were eliminated. The two teams that received the most votes during nominations were compromised. The Double Agents then had to vote two teams into the Crater to compete against the compromised teams, or could volunteer against either compromised team.

== Contestants ==
Male contestants	Original season	Finish
Chris "CT" Tamburello	The Real World: Paris	Winner
Cory Wharton	Real World: Ex-Plosion	Runner-up
Leroy Garrett	The Real World: Las Vegas (2011)	Third place
Faysal "Fessy" Shafaat	Big Brother 20	Fourth place
Kyle Christie	Geordie Shore 8	Episode 17 (Note: During the "Hall Brawl" elimination, Kyle dislocated his finger in the first round and was deemed medically unable to continue. Fessy was declared the winner by default.)
Darrell Taylor	Road Rules: Campus Crawl	Episode 14
Nam Vo	Ultimate Beastmaster 1	Episode 12 (Note: Prior to the "Survive the Night" challenge, Nam was deemed medically unable to continue in the game due to a back injury. Big T became a Rogue Agent since she was left without a partner.)
Josh Martinez	Big Brother 19	Episode 12
Devin Walker-Molaghan	Are You the One? 3	Episode 12
Demetrius "Mechie" Harris	Ex on the Beach 3	Episode 8
Jay Starrett	Survivor: Millennials vs. Gen X	Episode 7
Lio Rush	WWE NXT	Episode 6 (Note: Prior to the "Smuggle Run" challenge, Lio withdrew from the game due to personal matters regarding his mental health. Devin and Gabby formed a new pair since they were both left without a partner.)
Nelson Thomas	Are You the One? 3	Episode 4
Wes Bergmann	The Real World: Austin	Episode 3
Joseph Allen	America's Got Talent 14	Episode 2

Female contestants	Original season	Finish
Amber Borzotra	Big Brother 16	Winner
Kam Williams	Are You the One? 5	Runner-up
Nany Gonzalez	The Real World: Las Vegas (2011)	Third place
Kaycee Clark	Big Brother 20	Fourth place
Tula "Big T" Fazakerley	Shipwrecked: Battle of the Islands	Episode 16
Aneesa Ferreira	The Real World: Chicago	Episode 15
Gabby Allen	Love Island UK 3	Episode 13
Lolo Jones	US Olympian	Episode 11 (Note: Prior to the "Dead Ringer" elimination, Lolo withdrew from the game due to frustration regarding her performance in the competition, and to prepare for the upcoming Olympic Games. On social media, she disputed the portrayal of her exit, claiming production "forced" her to leave the competition.)
Amber Martinez	Are You the One? 8	Episode 10
Theresa Gonzalez-Jones	The Challenge: Fresh Meat II	Episode 9
Ashley Mitchell (Note: After losing the "Fire Escape" elimination in episode one, Ashley was brought back into the game prior to the "Agent Down" challenge as a replacement due to the number of female medical disqualifications. She was partnered with Cory upon her return.)	Real World: Ex-Plosion	Episode 6
Tori Deal	Are You the One? 4	Episode 5
Natalie Anderson	The Amazing Race 21	Episode 5 (Note: Prior to the "Agent Down" challenge, Natalie was deemed medically unable to continue in the game due to personal matters. In an interview, it was later revealed that her departure was because of her pregnancy.)
Olivia "Liv" Jawando	Shipwrecked: Battle of the Islands	Episode 4 (Note: Prior to the "Drone Control" challenge, Liv was medically removed from the competition after injuring her arm in the "Road Kill" challenge during the previous episode.)
Nicole Zanatta	Real World: Skeletons	Episode 3 (Note: Nicole was medically removed from the competition after dislocating her shoulder during the "Road Kill" challenge. Though Nicole had left the house following the challenge and did not vote at nominations, her departure was not formally announced until the "Snapping Point" elimination. Therefore, she and her partner Devin were still eligible to be voted into elimination as a team.)

== Gameplay ==
=== Challenge games ===
- Decryption: Played in male and female heats, contestants race up a volcanic mound to reach a capsule with a color code encrypted on it. They must memorize the code before returning to their station and duplicating the sequence, by connecting colored wires. The first player in each heat to correctly duplicate the sequence and detonate their station wins their heat, however, the heat winner with the fastest overall time earns the ability to select their partner and become the Double Agents.
  - Winner: Aneesa (Note: Aneesa was the overall winner in the "Mission Decryption" challenge, and could choose any male player to be her partner. She picked Fessy (the winner of the male heat), and they formed the Double Agent Pair.)
- Ice Spy: Teams swim through glacial water towards a boat to retrieve a block of ice with a "kill" capsule frozen inside, before returning to shore. They must remove the kill from the ice using an ice pick, and can place the kill in another team's station. Once a team receives three kills, they are eliminated from the challenge, however, they can still place the kill they currently possess. The last team standing wins.
  - Winners: Aneesa & Fessy
- Road Kill: Two teams at a time begin on the back of a moving truck. Each team member attempts to push their opponent of the same gender off the truck and onto the surrounding safety nets before timing out. The last player with any body part still on the platform wins the matchup for their team. The team that pushes both opponents off the truck the fastest wins the mission.
  - Winners: Kaycee & Leroy
- Drone Control: Played two teams at a time, one teammate wears a VR headset connected to the camera of a drone. They must direct their partner, who flies the drone using a controller, towards a number code at the opposite end of the tunnel. Once they obtain the sequence, the player wearing the headset must solve a binary puzzle before entering the code into a tablet. There is a ten-minute time limit before teams time out. The team with the fastest time wins.
  - Winners: Devin & Tori
- Agent Down: Played in two heats of six teams, the female partners begin harnessed on a ledge on the side of a platform while their male partner begins on top of the platform. The male players must pull 200 metres of rope out of the platform before they can hold onto their partner. The ledge drops after a certain time, however, the female team member can still hold the platform to avoid falling if their partner has not finished pulling the rope. The team that holds on the longest wins.
  - Winners: Big T & CT
- Smuggle Run: Teams carry a heavy cylindrical capsule on their shoulders and complete a five-mile race. Along the way, they must use their capsule to climb over a wall and solve a magic hexagon puzzle before reaching the finish line. The first team to cross the finish line wins. In addition to becoming the Double Agents, the winners also receive a cash prize of $6,000 each and a P3 Portable Protein reward.
  - Winners: Jay & Theresa
- Aerial Takedown: Played in male and female heats of five players. Players begin on a cargo net being dragged by a helicopter, and must push their opponents off the net into the water below without timing out. The player who pushes all their opponents off the cargo net first wins the heat, however, the player who achieves this the fastest wins for their team and becomes the Double Agents.
  - Winners: Kaycee & Leroy
- All Brawl: Played in three phases, each phase requires players to enter a mud-pit and obtain an X-shaped relic. The winners of each phase advance to the next phase. The team that wins the third phase wins and becomes the Double Agents.
  - In Phase One, five players of the same gender at a time enter the pit and must find the relic in the mud, escape the pit and cross the finish line with the relic to advance.
  - In Phase Two, the heat winners of the same gender from Phase One must wrestle the relic away from their opponent and bring the relic out of the mud-pit to advance.
  - In Phase Three, the individual winners from Phase Two and their partners must wrestle the relic out of their opponent's hands, where competitors face-off against their opponent of the same gender. The team that has both players win their individual matchup wins.
  - Winners: Kam & Kyle
- Interrogation: Played in two heats, with each heat containing one member of each team. Players begin standing on a platform above water, holding onto an overhead bar. One at a time, they are asked a true-or-false trivia question. If they answer correctly, they must select another player to have their bar tilt forward, making it more difficult to hold on. However, if they answer incorrectly, their own bar tilts forward. Players are eliminated if they fall in the water or hold onto the side of the apparatus. The last player standing wins their heat, while the player who answers the most questions correctly, or holds on the longest, wins for their team. In addition to becoming the Double Agents, the winners also receive a cash prize of $5,000 each.
  - Winners: Amber B. & Darrell
- Black Sand Ops: Teams search through a field of one hundred torches to find their colored puzzle pieces buried underneath ten of the torches. If they dig up another team's puzzle piece, they can either leave it unburied, or rebury the piece. Once they find all ten pieces, they must use the pieces to assemble an Icelandic totem by replicating a provided answer key. The first team to correctly assemble their totem wins.
  - Winners: Devin & Gabby
- Air Lift: Played one team at a time, teams begin on the bow of a moving speedboat and grab onto ropes attached to a nearby helicopter. They must hold onto the ropes until the helicopter reaches a drop-zone, before dropping into the water. Once in the water, teams swim towards a platform and press the button on top. Teams are disqualified if they are unable to grab a rope, or fall into the water prior to reaching the drop-zone. The team with the fastest time wins.
  - Winners: Big T & CT
- Survive the Night: Teams begin handcuffed together and locked in a cell. They must complete a series of tasks to unlock their handcuffs and escape. The first team to escape their cell wins.
  - Task 1: Hold a heavy "bomb" for two hours.
  - Task 2: Consume an entire tray of ram's testicles and fermented shark to find a message printed on the tray: "Solve the equation on the back".
  - Task 3: Flip the tray over to find a math equation, the solution of the equation forms the code to unlock a box containing hammers.
  - Task 4: Use the hammers to break through cinder blocks and search for a key, which unlocks team's handcuffs.
  - Task 5: Scratch a blackboard to reveal a clue: "The key to your freedom lies underneath".
  - Task 6: Dig through the dirt floor of the cell to find two hand files.
  - Task 7: Use the files to unlock the cell and escape.
  - Winners: Kaycee & Leroy
- Undercover: Teams must dive underwater, in between two tectonic plates, until they reach a line which stretches across the water. They must pull themselves along the line to collect six coded rings at the end before returning to the coding station at the start. Teams are disqualified if either player returns to the surface for air prior to collecting all six rings. Once teams return to the coding station, they must use the rings to decipher a six-letter code. The team with the fastest time wins.
  - Winners: Aneesa & Kyle
- Spy Dive: Played three teams at a time, each player must complete a tandem skydive from a plane and memorise a puzzle key that can be seen as they fall. Once all teams land, they must run half a mile across a field to their puzzle station, before assembling the puzzle by replicating the key they viewed. Teams may only begin assembling the puzzle once both team members reach the puzzle station. The first team to finish wins their heat, however the team with the fastest overall time wins and becomes the Double Agents.
  - Winners: Kaycee & Leroy
- Global Domination: Played in two rounds, with each three teams playing offense and two teams playing defense each round. Teams must enter a giant metal sphere; blue spheres represent defensive teams and silver spheres represent offensive teams. During their round as offense, teams roll down a ramp, onto a battleground and over as many targets as possible while the defense teams try to prevent them from doing so. Once the time limit expires, teams switch positions and the second round commences. The team that rolls over the most targets wins. (Note: Due to an uneven number of teams, one team had to play offense for both rounds of the "Global Domination" challenge, where their highest score is counted. The previous Double Agents, Kaycee & Leroy, were given the power to decide which team would play offense for both rounds and chose themselves.)
  - Winners: Kaycee & Leroy
- Escape the Volcano: In the morning, each team elects one member to leave the house and, unbeknownst to them, be transported to the crater of a volcano for the challenge. They are chained to the ground and given a briefcase. Their teammate must later undergo a five-mile race to the entrance of the volcano, solving two math problems along the way. At the volcano entrance, they must descend to their partner and unlock them before both team members return to the start. Once teams return to the start, they must use the pieces in the briefcase to solve a puzzle. The first team to solve the puzzle wins.
  - Winners: Cory & Kam

=== Crater games ===
- Fire Escape: Players are suspended by their wrists and ankles under a metal beam, and have to maneuver their way from one side of the beam to the other before returning to the start. The first player to return to the start wins. In its second and third appearances, the length of the beam is doubled and the number of obstacles on the beam is tripled.
  - Played by: Ashley vs. Natalie, Jay vs. Leroy, Aneesa vs. Big T
- Ring of Spies: Players begin at the center of the Crater with both hands on a metal ring. They must wrestle the ring away from their opponent and place it on their post. The first player to place the ring on their post twice wins. In its second appearance, players begin on opposite sides of the Crater and must race to retrieve the ring which is suspended at the center, before placing it on their post.
  - Played by: Joseph vs. Kyle, Gabby vs. Nany
- Snapping Point: Players begin with a rope hooked to their backs which attaches them to their opponent. They must run around three posts to reach a button. The first player to press the button wins. In its second appearance, players are attached to their opponent by a rope and begin facing opposite directions. They must collect three rings before placing them on posts at the boundary of the Crater. The first player to place a ring on all three posts wins. In its third appearance, the game returned to its first appearance, with the size of the rope doubled and the resistance tripled. The first player to press the button twice wins.
  - Played by: Devin vs. Wes, Kaycee vs. Theresa, Cory vs. Darrell
- Hall Brawl: In its first, third and fourth appearances, players must run through a narrow hallway, past their opponent and press a button at the opposite end. The player who pushes the button first twice (or three times in its fourth appearance) wins. In its second appearance, players must run through the hallway to collect a ball at the opposite end. They must then return through the hallway and place the ball in their bucket, repeating this process three times. The first player to retrieve all three balls wins.
  - Played by: Fessy vs. Nelson, Amber B. vs. Amber M., Amber B. vs. Big T, Fessy vs. Kyle
- Asset Destruction: Players pull a crate full of 'bombs' across the Crater and tip the crate over at the end to release the bombs. Once released, they must throw the bombs at a wall of targets. Only 13 of the 25 targets are breakable while the remaining 12 are solid. The first player to hit all 13 targets wins. In its second appearance called Asset Destruction II, players must solve a sliding puzzle that reveals the locations of the breakable targets prior to pulling the crate. Additionally, the crate and bombs inside are heavier and only 7 of the 25 targets are breakable.
  - Played by: Aneesa vs. Tori, Josh vs. Mechie
- Dead Ringer: Players begin harnessed on top of a platform with six metal rings. They must generate momentum to swing and place the rings on hooks attached to the surrounding poles. If they drop any rings, they must use all their remaining rings before being allowed to collect them. The first player to hook all six rings wins. In its second appearance, players swing and collect seven puzzle pieces which are higher and further away. Once they collect all seven puzzle pieces, they must return to their puzzle station and solve the tangram puzzle. The first player to solve the puzzle wins.
  - Played by: Ashley vs. Kam, Darrell vs. Devin, CT vs. Josh

=== Final Challenge ===
Day one

- First Leg: Teams must complete a three-mile run across Iceland's undulating terrain to reach the first checkpoint.
- Checkpoint 1 (Decryption): Once each pair arrives at the checkpoint, it is announced they would compete in a revisit of the opening challenge. Played in male and female heats, players must race up a volcanic mound to reach a capsule with a color code encrypted on it. They must memorize the code and return to their station to duplicate the sequence by connecting colored wires. The player with the fastest time from either heat wins and earns the opportunity to infiltrate any team and select a new partner.
  - Winner: Amber B.
- Second Leg: Teams must complete a two-mile run along Iceland's coastline to collect a key, before proceeding to the next checkpoint. Teams begin in intervals based on the order and time they completed the First Leg.
- Checkpoint 2: Teams use their key to unlock their station and consume a plate of fish eyes, sheep heart, sheep face and ram testicles. Additionally, they must each drink a litre of blood. The first team to finish wins and must assign a "Sabotage Plate" of sheep organs and another litre of blood for a remaining team to consume in addition to the contents of the checkpoint. Once complete, teams proceed to their next checkpoint on shore. The last team to reach the next checkpoint is eliminated.
  - Winners: Amber B. & CT
  - Eliminated: Fessy & Kaycee (4th place)
- Checkpoint 3: Teams kayak across the water towards a puzzle station, collecting puzzle pieces at a designated coastline along the way. Once they reach the puzzle station, teams must use the pieces to assemble an Icelandic totem before running to their next checkpoint inside an ice cave.
- Checkpoint 4: Teams must solve a math equation using numbers from a number board. While each player is given their own equation, the checkpoint is completed once one team member correctly solves their equation. The first player to solve the equation from the winning pair wins and earns the ability to infiltrate any team and select a new partner.
  - Winner: CT
- Overnight Stage: Teams are provided a bed and must spend the night in the ice cave. The first team to complete the previous checkpoint is given a waterproof sleeping bag, the second team is given a duvet with a waterproof cover, while the third team is given a blanket. One team member may sleep at a time, while their partner must stand and hold a capsule. If teams wish to switch places, the player holding the capsule must first submerge their face in a tub of glacial water.

Day two

- Checkpoint 5: Teams race up a glacier to collect two pickaxes and use them to retrieve a capsule frozen inside a block of ice. Once obtained, teams follow a marked path to their next checkpoint. The first team to complete the previous day's checkpoint have a five-minute headstart while the second team have a two-minute headstart.
- Checkpoint 6: Teams find a code inside their capsule that they decode using a provided puzzle key at their coding station, before continuing along the path. They must leave the capsule at a designated point and may not bring the code with them to the coding station.
- Checkpoint 7: Teams must solve a tangram puzzle before proceeding along an elevating path to the peak of a mountain where the finish is located. The first team to reach the mountain peak are declared the winners of Double Agents.
  - Winners: Amber B. & CT — $900,000 ($450,000 each)
  - Runners-up: Cory & Kam — $100,000 ($50,000 each)
  - Third place: Leroy & Nany

== Game summary ==
Episode		Gender	Winners	Crater contestants		Crater game	Crater outcome			
#	Mission	Gender	Winners	Voted in	Winners' pick	Crater game	Winner	Eliminated	Infiltrate	Infiltrated team
1	Decryption	Female	Aneesa & Fessy	Ashley & CT	Natalie & Wes	Fire Escape	Natalie	Ashley	No	—N/a
2	Ice Spy	Male	Aneesa & Fessy	Big T & Joseph	Kyle & Nany	Ring of Spies	Kyle	Joseph	Yes	Josh & Kam
3	Road Kill	Male	Kaycee & Leroy	Devin & Nicole	Natalie & Wes	Snapping Point	Devin	Wes	Yes	Cory & Tori
4	Drone Control	Male	Devin & Tori	Amber M. & Nelson	Aneesa & Fessy	Hall Brawl	Fessy	Nelson	Yes	Kaycee & Leroy
5	Agent Down	Female	Big T & CT	Aneesa & Leroy	Devin & Tori	Asset Destruction	Aneesa	Tori	Yes	Fessy & Kaycee
6	Smuggle Run	Female	Jay & Theresa	Ashley & Cory	Kam & Kyle	Dead Ringer	Kam	Ashley	No	—N/a
7	Aerial Takedown	Male	Kaycee & Leroy	Jay & Theresa (Note: As punishment for not attempting to win the "Aerial Takedown" challenge, CT, Darrell, Devin, Fessy, Josh, Kyle, Mechie and Nam's votes were all negated. The original vote tally (including the nullified votes) was 12 out of 19 votes for Jay & Theresa.)	—N/a	Fire Escape	Leroy	Jay	No	—N/a
8	All Brawl	Male	Kam & Kyle	Amber M. & Mechie	Josh & Nany	Asset Destruction II	Josh	Mechie	No	—N/a
9	Interrogation	Female	Amber B. & Darrell	Cory & Theresa	Kaycee & Leroy	Snapping Point	Kaycee	Theresa	No	—N/a
10	Black Sand Ops	Female	Devin & Gabby	Amber M. & Cory	Amber B. & Darrell	Hall Brawl	Amber B.	Amber M.	No	—N/a
11/12	Air Lift	Male	Big T & CT	Devin & Gabby	Amber B. & Darrell	Dead Ringer	Darrell	Devin	No	—N/a
11/12	Air Lift	Male	Big T & CT	Josh & Nany	—N/a	Dead Ringer	CT	Josh	Yes	Kam & Kyle
12/13	Survive the Night	Female	Kaycee & Leroy	Cory & Gabby	Kyle & Nany	Ring of Spies	Nany	Gabby	Yes	Aneesa & Fessy
14	Undercover	Male	Aneesa & Kyle	Amber B. & Darrell	Big T & Cory	Snapping Point	Cory	Darrell	Yes	CT & Kam
15	Spy Dive	Female	Kaycee & Leroy	Big T & CT	Aneesa & Kyle	Fire Escape	Big T	Aneesa	No	—N/a
16	Global Domination	Female	Kaycee & Leroy	Amber B. & Kyle	Big T & CT	Hall Brawl	Amber B.	Big T	Yes	Fessy & Nany
17	Escape the Volcano	Male	Cory & Kam	Amber B. & Fessy	Kyle & Nany	Hall Brawl	Fessy	Kyle	Yes	Kaycee & Leroy
18/19	Final Challenge	—N/a	Amber B. & CT	2nd: Cory & Kam; 3rd: Leroy & Nany; 4th: Fessy & Kaycee						

=== Elimination progress ===
Contestants	Episodes																
Contestants	1	2	3	4	5	6	7	8	9	10	11/12	12/13	14	15	16	17	Finale
Amber B.	SAFE	SAFE	SAFE	SAFE	SAFE	SAFE	SAFE	SAFE	WIN	ELIM	SAVE	SAFE	SAVE	EXM	ELIM	SAVE	WINNER
CT	SAVE	EXM	SAFE	SAFE	WIN	SAFE	SAFE	SAFE	SAFE	SAFE	VOL	SAFE	SAFE	SAVE	SAVE	EXM	WINNER
Cory	SAFE	SAFE	SAFE	SAFE	SAFE	SAVE	EXM	SAFE	SAVE	SAVE	EXM	SAVE	ELIM	SAFE	SAFE	WIN	SECOND
Kam	SAFE	SAFE	SAFE	SAFE	SAFE	ELIM	SAFE	WIN	SAFE	SAFE	SAFE	SAFE	SAFE	SAFE	SAFE	WIN	SECOND
Leroy	SAFE	SAFE	WIN	SAFE	SAVE	SAFE	VOL	SAFE	SAVE	SAFE	SAFE	WIN	SAFE	WIN	WIN	SAFE	THIRD
Nany	SAFE	SAVE	SAFE	SAFE	SAFE	SAFE	SAFE	SAVE	SAFE	SAFE	SAVE	ELIM	SAFE	SAFE	SAFE	SAVE	THIRD
Fessy	WIN	WIN	SAFE	ELIM	SAFE	SAFE	SAFE	SAFE	SAFE	SAFE	SAFE	SAFE	SAFE	SAFE	SAFE	ELIM	FOURTH
Kaycee	SAFE	SAFE	WIN	SAFE	SAFE	SAFE	WIN	SAFE	ELIM	SAFE	SAFE	WIN	SAFE	WIN	WIN	SAFE	FOURTH
Kyle	SAFE	ELIM	SAFE	SAFE	SAFE	SAVE	SAFE	WIN	SAFE	SAFE	SAFE	SAVE	WIN	SAVE	SAVE	MED	
Big T	SAFE	SAVE	SAFE	SAFE	WIN	SAFE	SAFE	SAFE	SAFE	SAFE	WIN	EXM	SAVE	ELIM	OUT		
Aneesa	WIN	WIN	SAFE	SAVE	ELIM	SAFE	SAFE	SAFE	SAFE	SAFE	SAFE	SAFE	WIN	OUT			
Darrell	SAFE	SAFE	SAFE	SAFE	SAFE	SAFE	SAFE	SAFE	WIN	SAVE	ELIM	SAFE	OUT				
Gabby	SAFE	SAFE	SAFE	SAFE	SAFE	SAFE	SAFE	SAFE	SAFE	WIN	SAVE	OUT					
Nam	SAFE	SAFE	SAFE	SAFE	SAFE	SAFE	SAFE	SAFE	SAFE	SAFE	EXM	MED					
Josh	SAFE	SAFE	SAFE	SAFE	SAFE	SAFE	SAFE	ELIM	SAFE	SAFE	OUT						
Devin	SAFE	SAFE	ELIM	WIN	SAVE	SAFE	SAFE	SAFE	SAFE	WIN	OUT						
Lolo	SAFE	SAFE	SAFE	SAFE	SAFE	SAFE	SAFE	SAFE	SAFE	SAFE	QUIT						
Amber M.	SAFE	SAFE	SAFE	SAVE	SAFE	SAFE	SAFE	SAVE	EXM	OUT							
Theresa	SAFE	SAFE	SAFE	SAFE	SAFE	WIN	SAVE	SAFE	OUT								
Mechie	SAFE	SAFE	SAFE	EXM	SAFE	SAFE	SAFE	OUT									
Jay	SAFE	SAFE	SAFE	SAFE	SAFE	WIN	OUT										
Ashley	OUT				SAFE	OUT											
Lio	SAFE	SAFE	SAFE	SAFE	SAFE	QUIT											
Tori	SAFE	SAFE	SAFE	WIN	OUT												
Natalie	ELIM	SAFE	SAVE	SAFE	MED												
Nelson	SAFE	SAFE	SAFE	OUT													
Liv	SAFE	SAFE	SAFE	MED													
Wes	SAVE	SAFE	OUT														
Nicole	SAFE	SAFE	MED														
Joseph	SAFE	OUT															

Competition
The contestant finished the Final Challenge and won
The contestant finished the Final Challenge and lost
The contestant was eliminated during the Final Challenge
The contestant's team won the daily challenge
The contestant was not selected for the Crater
The contestant's teammate was nominated for the Crater
The contestant was a Rogue Agent, did not have a partner or compete in the daily challenge, and was exempt from being voted into the Crater
The contestant won in the Crater and earned a Gold Skull
The contestant was a Double Agent, volunteered for the Crater, won and earned a Gold Skull
The contestant lost in the Crater and was eliminated
The contestant was removed from the competition due to medical reasons
The contestant withdrew from the competition

=== Team progress ===
Players	Episodes																	
Players	1	2	3	4	5	6	7	8	9	10	11	12	13	14	15	16	17	Finale
Amber B.	Darrell														Rogue	Kyle	Fessy	CT
CT	Ashley	Rogue	Big T									Kam			Big T		Rogue	Amber B.
Cory	Tori			Natalie	Ashley		Rogue	Theresa		Amber M.	Rogue	Gabby		Big T	Kam			
Kam	Josh		Kyle									CT			Cory			
Leroy	Kaycee				Aneesa	Kaycee												Nany
Nany	Kyle		Josh									Kyle		Fessy			Kyle	Leroy
Fessy	Aneesa				Kaycee	Aneesa								Nany			Amber B.	Kaycee
Kaycee	Leroy				Fessy	Leroy												Fessy
Kyle	Nany		Kam									Nany		Aneesa		Amber B.	Nany	
Big T	Joseph		CT									Nam	Rogue	Cory	CT			
Aneesa	Fessy				Leroy	Fessy								Kyle				
Darrell	Amber B.																	
Gabby	Lio					Devin						Cory						
Nam	Lolo											Big T						
Josh	Kam		Nany															
Devin	Nicole			Tori		Gabby												
Lolo	Nam																	
Amber M.	Nelson				Mechie				Rogue	Cory								
Theresa	Jay							Cory										
Mechie	Liv			Rogue	Amber M.													
Jay	Theresa																	
Ashley	CT				Cory													
Lio	Gabby																	
Tori	Cory			Devin														
Natalie	Wes			Cory														
Nelson	Amber M.																	
Liv	Mechie																	
Wes	Natalie																	
Nicole	Devin																	
Joseph	Big T																	

- Teams at the start of each episode

=== Gold Skull progress ===
Gender	Skull	Episodes																		
Gender	Skull	1	2	3	4	5	6	7	8	9	10	11	12	13	14	15	16	17	18	19
Female	1	Natalie				Aneesa										Big T				
Male	2		Kyle																	
Male	3			Devin									Darrell		Cory					
Male	4				Fessy															
Female	5						Kam													
Male	6							Leroy												
Male	7								Josh				CT							
Female	8									Kaycee										
Female	9										Amber B.									
Female	10													Nany						

- Gold Skull holder at the end of each episode

The Gold Skull was stolen after the contestant possessing it lost in the Crater and was eliminated from the competition
The Gold Skull was recycled after the contestant possessing it was removed from the competition due to medical reasons

== Voting progress ==
House Vote	**Ashley & CT**; 22 of 28 votes	**Big T & Joseph**; 17 of 27 votes	**Devin & Nicole**; 19 of 25 votes	**Amber M. & Nelson**; 12 of 23 votes	**Aneesa & Leroy**; 15 of 22 votes	**Ashley & Cory**; 9 of 20 votes	**Jay & Theresa**; 7 of 11 votes	**Amber M. & Mechie**; 10 of 18 votes	**Cory & Theresa**; 14 of 17 votes	**Amber M. & Cory**; 12 of 16 votes	**Devin & Gabby**; 8 of 15 votes	**Josh & Nany**; 5 of 15 votes	**Cory & Gabby**; 9 of 11 votes	**Amber B. & Darrell**; 6 of 10 votes	**Big T & CT**; 8 of 9 votes	**Amber B. & Kyle**; 5 of 8 votes	**Amber B. & Fessy**; 7 of 7 votes
Winner's Vote	**Natalie & Wes**; 2 of 2 votes	**Kyle & Nany**; 2 of 2 votes	**Natalie & Wes**; 2 of 2 votes	**Aneesa & Fessy**; 2 of 2 votes	**Devin & Tori**; 2 of 2 votes	**Kam & Kyle**; 2 of 2 votes	**Kaycee & Leroy**; Volunteered	**Josh & Nany**; 2 of 2 votes	**Kaycee & Leroy**; 2 of 2 votes	**Amber B. & Darrell**; 2 of 2 votes	**Amber B. & Darrell**; 2 of 2 votes	**Big T & CT**; Volunteered	**Kyle & Nany**; 2 of 2 votes	**Big T & Cory**; 2 of 2 votes	**Aneesa & Kyle**; 2 of 2 votes	**Big T & CT**; 2 of 2 votes	**Kyle & Nany**; 2 of 2 votes
Voter	Episodes																
Voter	1	2	3	4	5	6	7	8	9	10	11/12		12/13	14	15	16	17
Amber B.	Ashley & CT	Big T & Joseph	Devin & Nicole	Amber M. & Nelson	Aneesa & Leroy	Amber M. & Mechie	Jay & Theresa	Amber M. & Mechie	**Kaycee & Leroy**	Amber M. & Cory	Devin & Gabby		Cory & Gabby	Kaycee & Leroy	Big T & CT	Fessy & Nany	Amber B. & Fessy
CT	Gabby & Lio	Big T & Joseph	Devin & Nicole	Amber M. & Nelson	**Devin & Tori**	Ashley & Cory	~~Jay & Theresa~~	Aneesa & Fessy	Cory & Theresa	Josh & Nany	**Amber B. & Darrell**	**Big T & CT**	Kyle & Nany	Amber B. & Darrell	Big T & CT	Amber B. & Kyle	Amber B. & Fessy
Cory	Ashley & CT	Natalie & Wes	Devin & Nicole	Jay & Theresa	Fessy & Kaycee	Amber M. & Mechie	Jay & Theresa	Amber M. & Mechie	Lolo & Nam	Amber M. & Cory	Devin & Gabby		Cory & Gabby	Big T & Cory	Big T & CT	Amber B. & Kyle	**Kyle & Nany**
Kam	Ashley & CT	Natalie & Wes	Devin & Nicole	Big T & CT	Aneesa & Leroy	Devin & Gabby	Jay & Theresa	**Josh & Nany**	Cory & Theresa	Amber M. & Cory	Lolo & Nam		Kyle & Nany	Amber B. & Darrell	Big T & CT	Amber B. & Kyle	**Kyle & Nany**
Leroy	Ashley & CT	Big T & Joseph	**Natalie & Wes**	Anessa & Fessy	Aneesa & Leroy	Devin & Gabby	**Kaycee & Leroy**	Aneesa & Fessy	Cory & Theresa	Amber M. & Cory	Lolo & Nam		**Kyle & Nany**	Amber B. & Darrell	**Aneesa & Kyle**	**Big T & CT**	Amber B. & Fessy
Nany	Ashley & CT	Big T & Joseph	Devin & Nicole	Amber M. & Nelson	Aneesa & Leroy	Devin & Gabby	Devin & Gabby	Amber M. & Mechie	Cory & Theresa	Amber M. & Cory	Devin & Gabby		Cory & Gabby	Amber B. & Darrell	Big T & CT	Amber B. & Kyle	Amber B. & Fessy
Fessy	**Natalie & Wes**	**Kyle & Nany**	Devin & Nicole	Kam & Kyle	Amber M. & Mechie	Kam & Kyle	~~Devin & Gabby~~	Amber M. & Mechie	Cory & Theresa	Amber M. & Cory	Devin & Gabby		Cory & Gabby	Amber B. & Darrell	Big T & CT	Amber B. & Kyle	Amber B. & Fessy
Kaycee	Ashley & CT	Big T & Joseph	**Natalie & Wes**	Amber M. & Nelson	Aneesa & Leroy	Ashley & Cory	**Kaycee & Leroy**	Amber M. & Mechie	Cory & Theresa	Amber M. & Cory	Devin & Gabby		**Kyle & Nany**	Amber B. & Darrell	**Aneesa & Kyle**	**Big T & CT**	Amber B. & Fessy
Kyle	Ashley & CT	Big T & Joseph	Aneesa & Fessy	Aneesa & Fessy	Aneesa & Leroy	Amber M. & Mechie	~~Jay & Theresa~~	**Josh & Nany**	Cory & Theresa	Josh & Nany	Josh & Nany		Cory & Gabby	**Big T & Cory**	Aneesa & Kyle	Fessy & Nany	Amber B. & Fessy
Big T	Lolo & Nam	Natalie & Wes	Devin & Nicole	Amber M. & Nelson	**Devin & Tori**	Ashley & Cory	Jay & Theresa	Aneesa & Fessy	Cory & Theresa	Amber M. & Cory	**Amber B. & Darrell**	**Big T & CT**	Cory & Gabby	Big T & Cory	Big T & CT	Fessy & Nany	
Aneesa	**Natalie & Wes**	**Kyle & Nany**	Devin & Nicole	Amber M. & Nelson	Amber M. & Mechie	Amber M. & Mechie	Jay & Theresa	Amber M. & Mechie	Lolo & Nam	Amber M. & Cory	Devin & Gabby		Cory & Gabby	**Big T & Cory**	Big T & CT		
Darrell	Ashley & CT	Big T & Joseph	Devin & Nicole	Aneesa & Fessy	Aneesa & Leroy	Amber M. & Mechie	~~Jay & Theresa~~	Amber M. & Mechie	**Kaycee & Leroy**	Amber M. & Cory	Devin & Gabby		Cory & Gabby	Kaycee & Leroy			
Gabby	Ashley & CT	Natalie & Wes	Devin & Nicole	Amber M. & Nelson	Aneesa & Leroy	Ashley & Cory	Jay & Theresa	Aneesa & Fessy	Cory & Theresa	**Amber B. & Darrell**	Josh & Nany		Cory & Gabby				
Nam	Ashley & CT	Big T & Joseph	Cory & Tori	Amber M. & Nelson	Aneesa & Leroy	Ashley & Cory	~~Amber M. & Mechie~~	Aneesa & Fessy	Cory & Theresa	Lolo & Nam	Josh & Nany						
Josh	Ashley & CT	Big T & Joseph	Devin & Nicole	Jay & Theresa	Amber M. & Mechie	Amber M. & Mechie	~~Devin & Gabby~~	Amber M. & Mechie	Cory & Theresa	Amber M. & Cory	Devin & Gabby						
Devin	Gabby & Lio	Big T & Joseph	Cory & Tori	**Aneesa & Fessy**	Aneesa & Leroy	Ashley & Cory	~~Jay & Theresa~~	Aneesa & Fessy	Cory & Theresa	**Amber B. & Darrell**	Josh & Nany						
Lolo	Ashley & CT	Kyle & Nany	Devin & Nicole	Amber M. & Nelson	Aneesa & Leroy	Ashley & Cory	Devin & Gabby	Amber M. & Mechie	Cory & Theresa	Lolo & Nam	Josh & Nany						
Amber M.	Ashley & CT	Big T & Joseph	Devin & Nicole	Jay & Theresa	Aneesa & Leroy	Ashley & Cory	Jay & Theresa	Aneesa & Fessy	Cory & Theresa	Amber M. & Cory							
Theresa	Ashley & CT	Gabby & Lio	Devin & Nicole	Amber M. & Nelson	Devin & Tori	**Kam & Kyle**	Devin & Gabby	Amber M. & Mechie	Devin & Gabby								
Mechie	Ashley & CT	Big T & Joseph	Devin & Nicole	Jay & Theresa	Aneesa & Leroy	Ashley & Cory	~~Jay & Theresa~~	Aneesa & Fessy									
Jay	Ashley & CT	Gabby & Lio	Devin & Nicole	Amber M. & Nelson	Devin & Tori	**Kam & Kyle**	Devin & Gabby										
Ashley	Gabby & Lio				Aneesa & Leroy	Amber M. & Mechie											
Lio	Ashley & CT	Big T & Joseph	Devin & Nicole	Nany & Josh	Aneesa & Leroy												
Tori	Ashley & CT	Natalie & Wes	Devin & Nicole	**Aneesa & Fessy**	Amber M. & Mechie												
Natalie	Gabby & Lio	Big T & Joseph	Cory & Tori	Amber M. & Nelson													
Nelson	Ashley & CT	Natalie & Wes	Devin & Nicole	Jay & Theresa													
Liv	Ashley & CT	Big T & Joseph	Cory & Tori														
Wes	Gabby & Lio	Big T & Joseph	Cory & Tori														
Nicole	Ashley & CT	Big T & Joseph															
Joseph	Ashley & CT	Natalie & Wes															

- **Bold** indicates the team was voted in by the Double Agents

== Episodes ==
No. overall	No. in season	Title	Original release date	US viewers (millions)
470	1	"License to Killer Kam"	December 9, 2020	0.90
471	2	"Dive Another Day"	December 16, 2020	0.84
472	3	"Enemy of the State"	December 23, 2020	0.79
473	4	"Duplicity"	January 6, 2021	0.82
474	5	"Skyfall"	January 13, 2021	0.77
475	6	"From Theresa With Love"	January 20, 2021	0.88
476	7	"Die Another Jay"	January 27, 2021	0.99
477	8	"A Muddy Matter"	February 3, 2021	0.92
478	9	"Lady Vengeance"	February 10, 2021	0.97
479	10	"A Clockwork Amber"	February 17, 2021	0.89
480	11	"An Inconvenient Goof"	February 24, 2021	0.76
481	12	"Tinker, Tailer, Bunny, Spy"	March 3, 2021	0.89
482	13	"The Spy Who Loved Fessy"	March 10, 2021	0.93
483	14	"The Best of Enemies"	March 17, 2021	0.89
484	15	"Never Say Never Again"	March 24, 2021	0.96
485	16	"A Most Wanted Man"	March 31, 2021	0.91
486	17	"True Lies"	April 7, 2021	0.90
487	18	"No Time To Die"	April 14, 2021	0.93
488	19	"The World Is Not Enough"	April 21, 2021	0.99

=== Reunion special ===
The two-part reunion special aired on April 28 and May 5, 2021, and was hosted by former NFL player Vernon Davis. The cast members who attended the reunion were CT, Nany, Kam, Cory, Leroy, Amber B., Kaycee, Josh, Devin, Tori, Aneesa, Fessy, Jay, Ashley, and Amber M. Big T, Kyle, Nelson, Nam, Gabby and Darrell also appeared via satellite.

== Impact of the COVID-19 pandemic ==
Double Agents was filmed in Iceland amid the COVID-19 pandemic, where precautions took place to ensure the safety of the cast and production. Both cast and crew were tested for COVID-19 every three days and were required to undergo quarantine prior to the filming of the season. Preparation for the show took production over ten months (longer than most other seasons) and filming locations were scouted virtually due to international travel restrictions. While the international crew occupied a hotel, hired Icelandic locals would instead return home at the end of the day to maintain a bubble, and were kept separate from the cast through a tiered system represented by colored bands. Showrunner Emer Harkin revealed that production was required to wear PPE and remain six-feet apart from cast members. Harkin also revealed that unlike other seasons, where the cast recreated at local venues between challenges, an on-premise club separate to the house was built as an alternative to maintain the filming bubble. During the nine weeks that the season filmed for, none of the 3,000 conducted COVID-19 tests returned positive.
