= Cheyenne Parker =

Cheyenne Parker may refer to:

- Cheyenne Parker-Tyus
- Cheyenne Parker (model)
