= Ex on the Beach (American TV series) season 2 =

Ex on the Beach
- Season 2
- Presented by: Romeo Miller
- No. of housemates: 28
- Location: Malibu, California
- No. of episodes: 14

Release
- Original network: MTV
- Original release: December 20, 2018 – April 4, 2019

Season chronology
- ← Previous; Season 1 Next → Season 3

The second season of the American version of the reality television show Ex on the Beach, premiered on MTV on Thursday, December 20, 2018. It featured cast members from various reality television shows living together in California with their ex-partners.

== Cast ==
Cast member	Original series	Exes
Chad Johnson	The Bachelorette 12	Madeline Sullivan
Cheyenne Parker	Fire Island	Murray Swanby
Farrah Abraham	Teen Mom	Simon Saran
Janelle Shanks	Bad Girls Club: Miami	Darian Vandermark (Nelson Thomas)
Jozea Flores	Big Brother 18	Rob Tini
Malcolm Drummer	Are You the One? 6	Diandra Delgado, Nurys Mateo
Maya Benberry	Catching Kelce	Kareem Peterson, J.D. Harmon, Perez Carothers
Morgan Willett	Big Brother: Over the Top	Jay Starrett, Corey Brooks, Monte Massongill
Nicole Ramos	The Challenge: Battle of the Bloodlines	Nate Sestok
Corey Brooks	Big Brother 18	Morgan Willett, Sha Carrell
Angela Babicz	Bad Girls Club: Twisted Sisters	Tor'i Brooks
Diandra Delgado	Are You the One? 6	Malcolm Drummer (Nelson Thomas)
Jay Starrett	Survivor: Millennials vs. Gen X	Morgan Willett
Kareem Peterson	—N/a	Maya Benberry
Murray Swanby	What Happens at The Abbey	Cheyenne Parker, Cory Zwierzynski
Simon Saran	Teen Mom	Farrah Abraham
Cory Zwierzynski	What Happens at The Abbey	Murray Swanby
Nurys Mateo	Are You the One? 6	Malcolm Drummer, Nelson Thomas
Sha Carrell	—N/a	Corey Brooks
Nelson Thomas	Are You the One? 3	Nurys Mateo (Janelle Shanks, Diandra Delgado)
Rob Tini	—N/a	Jozea Flores
Darian Vandermark	—N/a	Janelle Shanks
Monte Massongill	Big Brother: Over the Top	Morgan Willett
J.D. Harmon	—N/a	Maya Benberry
Madeline Sullivan	—N/a	Chad Johnson
Nate Sestok	—N/a	Nicole Ramos
Perez Carothers	—N/a	Maya Benberry
Tor'i Brooks	Ex on the Beach 1	Angela Babicz

=== Cast duration ===
Cast members	Episodes													
Cast members	1	2	3	4	5	6	7	8 (Note: Due to Farrah getting eliminated in Episode 8, a new single, Angela, entered the house in her place.)	9 (Note: In Episode 9, Janelle was removed from the house after numerous physical altercations with Darian, Diandra, and Angela.)	10	11	12 (Note: In Episode 12, Nicole was removed from the house after multiple altercations with Madeline and a physical altercation with a producer.)	13	14
Chad														
Cheyenne														
Farrah														
Janelle														
Jozea														
Malcolm														
Maya														
Morgan														
Nicole														
Corey B.														
Angela														
Diandra														
Jay														
Kareem														
Murray														
Simon														
Cory Z.														
Nurys														
Sha														
Nelson														
Rob														
Darian														
Monte														
J.D.														
Madeline														
Nate														
Perez														
Tor'i														

Table key
= The cast member is featured in this episode
= The cast member arrives on the beach
= The cast member has an ex arrive on the beach
= The cast member arrives on the beach and has an ex arrive during the same episode
= The cast member leaves the beach
= The cast member arrives on the beach and leaves during the same episode
= The cast member does not feature in this episode

== Episodes ==
No. overall	No. in season	Title	Original release date	U.S. viewers (millions)
12	1	"Paradise From Hell"	December 20, 2018	0.63
13	2	"Being Shady 101"	December 27, 2018	0.66
14	3	"Simon Says"	January 3, 2019	0.75
15	4	"Worst Date Ever"	January 10, 2019	0.68
16	5	"Jay is for Jealous"	January 17, 2019	0.67
17	6	"Low Blows"	January 24, 2019	0.70
18	7	"Revenge is Sweet"	January 31, 2019	0.63
19	8	"Here Comes Trouble"	February 7, 2019	0.59
20	9	"Un-Bear-Able"	February 14, 2019	0.64
21	10	"How to Keep a Man 101"	February 21, 2019	0.62
22	11	"Ghost of a Relationship's Past"	February 28, 2019	0.63
23	12	"Bad Bromance"	March 7, 2019	0.63
24	13	"Ex-viction Notice"	March 14, 2019	0.76
25	14	"Ex, Lies, and Polygraph Tape"	March 21, 2019	0.71
–	–	"Reunion"	March 28, 2019 April 4, 2019	0.57 0.67
