= Are You the One? season 8 =

American reality television program

Are You the One?
- Season 8
- Presented by: Terrence J
- No. of contestants: 16
- Location: Kona, Hawaii
- No. of episodes: 12

Release
- Original network: MTV
- Original release: June 26 – September 9, 2019

Season chronology
- ← Previous; Season 7 Next → Season 9

Are You the One? Come One, Come All is the eighth season of MTV's reality dating series Are You the One?. It was filmed in Kona, Hawaii and premiered on June 26, 2019. For the first time on Are You the One?, all cast members were sexually fluid, with no gender limitations on their potential perfect matches.

== Cast ==
Cast members	Age	Hometown
Aasha Wells	22	Miami Beach, Florida
Amber Martinez	23	Yonkers, New York
Basit Shittu	25	Brooklyn, New York
Brandon Davis	25	Salt Lake City, Utah
Danny Prikazsky	27	San Jose, California
Jasmine Olson	21	Oxford, Mississippi
Jenna Brown	25	Bloomington, Indiana
Jonathan Monroe	28	Panama City Beach, Florida
Justin Palm	24	Palmdale, California
Kai Wes	26	Chepachet, Rhode Island
Kari Snow	23	East Hanover, New Jersey
Kylie Smith	24	Salt Lake City, Utah
Max Gentile	25	Columbus, Ohio
Nour Fraij	25	Kenilworth, New Jersey
Paige Cole	21	Allen, Texas
Remy Duran	27	New York City, New York

== Progress ==
Contestants	Ceremony									
Contestants	1	2	3	4	5	6	7	8	9	10
Aasha	Paige	Brandon	Max	Remy	Kai	Brandon	Brandon	Brandon	Brandon	Brandon
Amber	Nour	Nour	Paige	Nour	Nour	Jenna	Danny	Paige	Kylie	Remy
Basit	Jonathan	Jonathan	Remy	Danny	Remy	Jonathan	Jonathan	Jonathan	Jonathan	Jonathan
Brandon	Remy	Aasha	Jonathan	Jasmine	Max	Aasha	Aasha	Aasha	Aasha	Aasha
Danny	Kai	Remy	Kai	Basit	Kari	Kai	Amber	Kylie	Kai	Kai
Jasmine	Jenna	Justin	Nour	Brandon	Paige	Kylie	Kai	Nour	Nour	Nour
Jenna	Jasmine	Kai	Justin	Paige	Kylie	Amber	Paige	Kari	Paige	Paige
Jonathan	Basit	Basit	Brandon	Kylie	Justin	Basit	Basit	Basit	Basit	Basit
Justin	Max	Jasmine	Jenna	Max	Jonathan	Max	Max	Max	Remy	Kylie
Kai	Danny	Jenna	Danny	Kari	Aasha	Danny	Jasmine	Remy	Danny	Danny
Kari	Kylie	Kylie	Kylie	Kai	Danny	Paige	Remy	Jenna	Max	Max
Kylie	Kari	Kari	Kari	Jonathan	Jenna	Jasmine	Nour	Danny	Amber	Justin
Max	Justin	Paige	Aasha	Justin	Brandon	Justin	Justin	Justin	Kari	Kari
Nour	Amber	Amber	Jasmine	Amber	Amber	Remy	Kylie	Jasmine	Jasmine	Jasmine
Paige	Aasha	Max	Amber	Jenna	Jasmine	Kari	Jenna	Amber	Jenna	Jenna
Remy	Brandon	Danny	Basit	Aasha	Basit	Nour	Kari	Kai	Justin	Amber
Correct matches	2	2	2	1	0	3	3	3	6	8

Notes

- Name Unconfirmed perfect match
- Name Confirmed perfect match
- In episode 7, it was shown onscreen that Basit and Jonathan were a perfect match. This marked the first time in the series' history that the audience was given information that was unknown to the house.

=== Truth Booths ===
Couple	Week	Result
Justin & Nour	1	Not A Match
Brandon & Remy	2	Not A Match
Jenna & Kai	3	Not A Match
Danny & Jenna	4	Not A Match
Kari & Kylie	5	Not A Match
Aasha & Brandon	6	Perfect Match
Jasmine & Jenna	7	Not A Match
Paige & Remy	8	Not A Match
Amber & Max	9	Not A Match
Amber & Kylie	10	Not A Match

== Episodes ==
No. overall	No. in season	Title	Original release date	U.S. viewers (millions)
77	1	"Come One, Come All"	June 26, 2019	0.29 (MTV); 0.29 (VH1)
78	2	"Come One, Come All"	June 26, 2019	0.25 (MTV); 0.23 (VH1)
16 singles arrive in Hawaii searching for their perfect match and find out they are all sexually fluid. Amber and Nour are attracted to one another, but Nour then chooses go on a date with Justin. Kai opens up to Jenna about being a transmasculine non-binary person and they have sex for the first time, only for Kai to have sex with Remy shortly after.
79	3	"This is Trash"	July 3, 2019	0.33
Jonathan reveals he is into masculine guys and Basit does not feel accepted by him. Max opens up to Justin about not embracing his bisexuality.
80	4	"We Come to Slay"	July 10, 2019	0.35
Jenna thinks her and Kai are not a perfect match and they end up fighting, after going on a date together they manage to rekindle their relationship, but the other singles think they are toxic for one another and vote them into the Truth Booth hoping for a definite answer. Nour is jealous of Amber, but later upsets her by kissing Kylie. The house throws a queer prom.
81	5	"There Was a Fivesome?"	July 17, 2019	0.51
Jenna gets closer to Danny, but she is still unable to forget Kai. Kari is convinced Kylie is her perfect match, but she is disappointed when she finds out about Kylie participating in a fivesome without her. Max gets angry at Justin after seeing him kissing Aasha, but he manages to forgive him.
82	6	"Hate to Burst Your Bubble"	July 24, 2019	0.40
Jasmine and Kai are attracted to each other, they hook up in the bathroom and Jenna is not happy about it. Kari and Kylie are voted into the truth booth and the whole house is shocked when they are revealed not to be a perfect match. Jonathan's inability to forget Justin and Nour's confidence in her and Amber being a perfect match end up causing the first black-out ceremony and costing the house $ 250,000.
83	7	"Red Flag Alert"	July 31, 2019	0.43
After the black-out, Jonathan is finally ready to get to know Basit and the two develop a connection. Despite not forgetting Jenna, Kai grows closer to Nour, and also kisses Danny. Amber tries to move on with Jenna. Perfect Match #1: Brandon & Aasha Perfect Match #2: Jonathan & Basit
84	8	"This Sucks and Blows"	August 5, 2019	0.20
Remy is attracted by Paige, but she does not seem to reciprocate. Kai is developing bonds with Jasmine, Nour and Danny, but does not feel ready for commitment yet. This angers Nour, that decides to confront Jasmine about it, but the situation escalates.
85	9	"Games Players Play"	August 12, 2019	0.35
After the fight between Nour and Jasmine, Kai goes back to Jenna and says he loves her, but Jenna rejects him. The other singles are proud of Jenna for standing her ground, and are also tired of Kai's behaviour.
86	10	"It All Comes Down to Jax"	August 19, 2019	0.23
After another unsuccessful truth booth, the singles start analyzing past match-up ceremonies and figure out that Nour and Jasmine are a perfect match, the two try to move past their drama and find out they have a lot in common. Amber likes Justin and starts thinking that he and Max are not actually a match and that Danny and Kai are instead.
87	11	"On to the Next"	September 2, 2019	0.24
Max is devastated to find out that he and Justin are not a perfect match, while Paige and Jenna discover that they actually are a match. This leaves six people without a partner: Kylie, Kari, Remy, Max, Justin and Amber. Max starts thinking Kari could be his match, and Kylie prepares a romantic surprise for Amber.
88	12	"All or Nothing"	September 9, 2019	0.22
After another unsuccessful Truth Booth, the house is desperate to find the last three matches. Amber reconnects with Justin, but she is not sure whether her perfect match is him or Remy.

== Reception ==
The season received generally favorable reviews. Critics praise the show's diverse cast with The Atlantic describing it as a "fascinating tonal mashup". When compared to other dating reality shows such as Paradise Hotel, Temptation Island, and Love Island, The Daily Beast described Are you the One? as the "best of these".

=== Awards ===
This season received a GLAAD Media Award for Outstanding Reality Program in 2020. It was nominated for a Critics' Choice Real TV Awards for Relationship Show.

== After filming ==
While this season did not include an official reunion episode, a majority of the season's cast members opted to participate in a reunion special hosted by AfterBuzz TV and confirmed a number of their post-finale relationship statuses.

=== The Challenge ===
Cast member	Seasons of The Challenge
Amber Martinez	Double Agents
