= Ex on the Beach (American TV series) season 3 =

Ex on the Beach
- Season 3
- Presented by: Romeo Miller
- No. of housemates: 26
- Location: Malibu, California
- No. of episodes: 14

Release
- Original network: MTV
- Original release: July 16 – October 24, 2019

Season chronology
- ← Previous; Season 2 Next → Season 4

The third season of the American version of the reality television show Ex on the Beach, premiered on MTV on July 16, 2019. It featured ten singles from various reality television shows living together in Malibu with their ex-partners.

== Cast ==
Cast member	Original series	Exes
Alexa "Lexi" Kaplan	Inst@famous	Max-Davis Kurtzman
Allie Kaplan	Inst@famous	—N/a
Aubrey O'Day	Making the Band 3	Lisa Coffey
Billy Reilich	What Happens at The Abbey	Cara Cooper, Emily Arreseigor, Tyler Garrigus
Cameron Armstrong	Boy Band	Alexis McNeal, Ariana Nova
Demetrius "Mechie" Harris	—N/a	Kellie Sweet, Danielle Clarke
Devin Walker-Molaghan	Are You the One? 3	Marie Roda
Geles Rodriguez	Are You the One? 6	Anthony Martin
Kenya Scott	Are You the One? 7	Tevin Grant
Mark Jansen	Big Brother 19	Elena Davies
Anthony Martin	Are You the One? 6	Geles Rodriguez, Shannon Duffy
Elena Davies	Big Brother 19	Mark Jansen
Cara Cooper	—N/a	Billy Reilich
Shannon Duffy	Are You the One? 5	Anthony Martin
Marie Roda	The Real World: St. Thomas	Devin Walker-Molaghan, Anthony Bartolotte, Jason Walsh
Tevin Grant	Are You the One? 7	Kenya Scott
Alexis McNeal	—N/a	Cameron Armstrong
Anthony Bartolotte	Are You the One? 2	Marie Roda
Max-Davis Kurtzman	—N/a	Alexa "Lexi" Kaplan
Ariana Nova	—N/a	Cameron Amstrong
Lisa Coffey	—N/a	Aubrey O'Day
Emily Arreseigor	—N/a	Billy Reilich
Kellie Sweet	—N/a	Demetrius "Mechie" Harris
Jason Walsh	—N/a	Marie Roda
Tyler Garrigus	—N/a	Billy Reilich
Danielle Clarke	—N/a	Demetrius "Mechie" Harris

=== Cast duration ===
Cast members	Episodes													
Cast members	1	2	3	4	5	6	7	8	9	10	11	12	13	14
Allie														
Aubrey														
Billy														
Cameron														
Devin														
Geles														
Kenya														
Lexi														
Mark														
Mechie														
Anthony M.														
Elena														
Cara														
Shannon														
Marie														
Tevin														
Alexis														
Anthony B.														
Max														
Ariana														
Lisa														
Emily														
Kellie														
Jason														
Tyler														
Danielle														

Table key
= The cast member is featured in this episode
= The cast member arrives on the beach
= The cast member has an ex arrive on the beach
= The cast member arrives on the beach and has an ex arrive during the same episode
= The cast member leaves the beach
= The cast member arrives on the beach and leaves during the same episode
= The cast member features in this episode as a guest
= The cast member does not feature in this episode

== Episodes ==
No. overall	No. in season	Title	Original release date	U.S. viewers (millions)
26	1	"Love, Next Love"	July 16, 2019	0.55
Ten singles arrive in Malibu looking for their next love. Mechie and Kenya have an instant connection and the same happens for Geles and Cameron, and Aubrey and Mark, but their dates are ruined by the first two exes: Anthony M. and Elena.
27	2	"Serving Revenge"	July 23, 2019	0.55
Shannon arrives at the beach and is immediately attracted to Mechie. Despite claiming to be completely over her, Mark has sex with Elena in the bathroom. They later go in the Shack of Secrets, where they meet the girl Mark hooked up with before Valentine's Day. Elena feels disrespected after learning the truth and is voted out of the house shortly after.
28	3	"I Put a Crush on You"	July 30, 2019	0.47
With Elena gone, Mark feels ready to get to know Aubrey and they go on a date. Kenya welcomes her ex and they still have feelings for each other. Devin is happy to see Marie coming in since he is not connecting with the other girls. The Kaplan twins organize a paint party hoping for it to be drama free, only for Aubrey and Devin to fight about it.
29	4	"Cam You Feel the Love Tonight"	August 6, 2019	0.39
Alexis arrives at the beach and immediately goes in the Shack of Secrets, where she finds out what happened between Cameron and Geles. Billy is getting closer to Lexi and he is afraid Cara will get in the way, so he votes her out of the house.
30	5	"This is Episode 5, but Let's Call it 6"	August 15, 2019	0.53
On a scale from "friendzone" to "girlfriend", Devin calls Marie a six during their date. Marie is hurt by him and gladly welcomes Anthony B. in the house. Billy organizes a double date for him and Lexi, and Mark and Allie. Despite their constant bickering, Anthony M. gets back with Shannon, but the house is tired of their toxic relationship.
31	6	"The Mother of All Secrets"	August 22, 2019	0.39
After Cameron, Geles moves on to Anthony B. and they share a kiss. Lexi's ex arrives at the beach hoping to rekindle their relationship, but Allie thinks her sister deserves better, while Marie doesn't perceive the twins as genuine.
32	7	"Exes Haunt These Fields"	August 29, 2019	0.42
Cameron and Alexis go on a date, but his ex and current roommate, Ariana, shows up looking for answers. Billy feels alone since Lexi and Max are back together.
33	8	"Coffey Run"	September 5, 2019	0.43
Aubrey is happy to see her ex coming and would like to have an open relationship with both her and Mark. Ariana and Cameron's third roommate, Joslyn, is called at the Shack of Secrets and exposes him as a liar and a cheater, but Alexis still does not want to listen. Billy wants to get rid of Max, but Kenya and Geles have other plans and vote out Alexis so that she will be able to move past Cameron.
34	9	"I Want it That Way"	September 12, 2019	0.38
Coffey does not seem to be worried about Mark, at least until him and Aubrey have sex for the first time. Ariana connects with Mechie, Cameron thinks she is being disrespectful towards him, but Mark and Devin call him out on his lies. Billy happily reconnects with his ex, Emily.
35	10	"Roses are Red, Exes Make you Blue"	September 19, 2019	0.48
The other singles find out that Allie has a boyfriend at home and start to think she should not be on a dating show and, since the power is in the exes' hands, she gets voted out of the house. Shannon reveals she has a crush on Devin, while Marie threatens to leave the house.
36	11	"Thruple Trouble"	September 26, 2019	0.37
Marie decides to stay and gladly welcomes her ex, Jason, but she is disappointed by his immature behaviour and later catches Shannon and Devin in bed. Billy and Emily go on a date, but Tyler interrupts them. Billy would like to have an open relationship with them both, but his exes do not share the same wish.
37	12	"Two for One Deal"	October 3, 2019	0.47
Mark dumps Aubrey over her controlling behaviour on both him and Coffey. Danielle arrives at the beach and goes in the Shack of Secrets with Mechie, it is obvious they are still interested in one another and this upsets Ariana. Marie and Jason are eliminated in the last Cut Week of the season, with Devin casting the decisive vote on Marie, thus losing her as a friend.
38	13	"Show me the Receipts"	October 10, 2019	0.43
Alexis, Allie and Tyler come back in the house during a pool party. A polygraph test reveals the truth about the cast's relationships.
39	14	"The Final Crush"	October 17, 2019	0.44
The singles have to make their final decisions and leave either with their next or on their own.
–	–	"Reunion"	October 24, 2019	0.44
