= Ex on the Beach (American TV series) season 4 =

American reality television program

Ex on the Beach: Peak of Love
- Season 4
- Presented by: Romeo Miller
- No. of housemates: 26
- Location: Queenstown, New Zealand
- No. of episodes: 14

Release
- Original network: MTV
- Original release: December 5, 2019 – February 27, 2020

Season chronology
- ← Previous; Season 3 Next → Season 5

Ex on the Beach: Peak of Love is the winter-themed fourth season of the American version of the reality television show Ex on the Beach. It premiered on MTV on December 5, 2019. It featured ten singles from various reality television shows living together in Queenstown, New Zealand with their ex-partners.

== Cast ==
Cast member	Original series	Exes
Adore Delano	RuPaul's Drag Race 6	Jakk Maddox, Trenton Clark
Allie DiMeco	The Naked Brothers Band	Cameron Sikes, Carlos Chavez
Callum Izzard	Ibiza Weekender	Megan Nash, Paris Decaro
Daniel Maguire	The Bachelorette 12	Sydney Langston
Georgia Steel	Love Island UK 4	Niall Aslam, Sam Bird
La Demi Martinez	Glam Masters	Tyler Ash
Marlon Williams	The Real World: Portland	Jemmye Carroll, Todd Maurer
Nicole Zanatta	Real World: Skeletons	Ashley Ceasar, Laurel Stucky (Jemmye Carroll)
Ryan Gallagher	American Idol	Magdalena Ruiz
Tyranny Todd	Are You the One? 5	E'Mari Stevenson
Laurel Stucky	The Challenge: Fresh Meat II	Nicole Zanatta
Megan Nash	—N/a	Callum Izzard
Jakk Maddox	—N/a	Adore Delano
Sydney Langston	—N/a	Daniel Maguire
Tyler Ash	—N/a	La Demi Martinez
Niall Aslam	Love Island UK 4	Georgia Steel
Jemmye Carroll	The Real World: New Orleans (2010)	Marlon Williams (Nicole Zanatta)
Sam Bird	Love Island UK 4	Georgia Steel
Magdalena Ruiz	—N/a	Ryan Gallagher
Ashley Ceasar	Real World: Ex-Plosion	Nicole Zanatta
Carlos Chavez	Temptation Island	Allie DiMeco
Todd Mauer	—N/a	Marlon Williams
Paris Decaro	—N/a	Callum Izzard
E'Mari Stevenson	—N/a	Tyranny Todd
Trenton Clark	—N/a	Adore Delano
Cameron Sikes	Temptation Island	Allie DiMeco

=== Cast duration ===
Cast members	Episodes													
Cast members	1	2	3	4	5	6	7	8	9	10	11	12	13	14
Adore (Note: Adore is referred to by her drag name, Adore, and her boy name, Danny throughout the season.)														
Allie														
Callum														
Daniel														
Georgia														
La Demi														
Marlon														
Nicole														
Ryan														
Tyranny														
Laurel														
Megan														
Jakk														
Sydney														
Niall														
Tyler														
Jemmye														
Sam														
Magdalena														
Ashley														
Carlos														
Todd														
Paris														
E'Mari														
Trenton														
Cameron														

Table key
= The cast member is featured in this episode
= The cast member arrives on the peak
= The cast member has an ex arrive on the peak
= The cast member arrives on the peak and has an ex arrive during the same episode
= The cast member leaves the peak
= The cast member arrives on the peak and leaves during the same episode
= The cast member features in this episode as a guest
= The cast member does not feature in this episode

== Episodes ==
No. overall	No. in season	Title	Original release date	U.S. viewers (millions)
40	1	"Welcome to the Peak"	December 5, 2019	0.40
Ten singles arrive in New Zealand hoping to find their next love. Callum and Nicole find their potential next in Georgia and Allie respectively, but the arrival of the first two exes put a wrench in their plans.
41	2	"Winter Un-Wonderland"	December 5, 2019	0.33
Adore gladly welcomes Jakk in the house, hoping to rekindle their relationship. La Demi opens up with Georgia and Adore, revealing that she is transgender and also that she is attracted to Marlon, but gets upset after seeing him flirting with others.
42	3	"Caught Red Velvet Handed"	December 12, 2019	0.32
Laurel goes in the Sauna of Secrets with Nicole, where she gets confirmation about her past cheating and finds out that she kissed Allie behind her back. Hoping to move on with Georgia, Callum votes Megan out of the house.
43	4	"De Niall is not Just an Ex"	December 19, 2019	0.28
La Demi welcomes Tyler, her ex that she knows since before transitioning. Georgia and Callum go on a date, but are interrupted by Niall, Georgia seems not completely over him; Allie and Tyranny like the newcomer as well. Jakk gets in Marlon's bed, upsetting Adore.
44	5	"Boo Years Eve!"	December 26, 2019	0.31
Jemmye arrives at the chalet hoping to make things clear with Marlon, but with her phone cleared of any evidence. Meanwhile Niall chooses Allie over Tyranny, and Sydney realizes Daniel is not her next. Nicole votes out Laurel so that she can feel free to pursue other people.
45	6	"The Bird Has Landed"	January 2, 2020	0.39
Now that Laurel is out, Nicole bonds with Sydney. Georgia is not happy to see her ex Sam in the chalet. La Demi starts flirting with the newcomer, but both Georgia and Callum think Sam is playing her in hopes of not being voted out. Niall takes Allie on a date, but she thinks he is too immature for her and it does not end well.
46	7	"SOS, Save Our Singles"	January 9, 2020	0.37
Magdalena arrives on the peak, but Ryan doesn't fully trust her. Laurel comes back to announce her revenge: the power shifts and one of the singles is getting voted out.
47	8	"Ex-cuzzi"	January 16, 2020	0.37
Carlos arrives on the peak for Allie, but Niall is annoyed by their connection. Sydney and Nicole go on a date together, unknowingly to them, Ashley listen to their whole conversation before surprising them in the jacuzzi. Marlon and La Demi finally share a kiss.
48	9	"Mums the Word"	January 23, 2020	0.30
Nicole moves on from Sydney to Ashley, while Marlon welcomes Todd to the chalet and wants to pursue him instead of La Demi. Georgia and Callum make their relationship official after meeting each other's mom in the Sauna of Secrets. Adore is afraid her interest in Tyler could get in the way of her friendship with La Demi.
49	10	"Don't Say Soulmate"	January 30, 2020	0.35
Another ex of Callum's arrives and Georgia is frustrated about it. Jemmye makes sure Sam gets to go on a date but only if he agrees to take Paris with him instead of Tyranny. Her plan works and Tyranny is not happy about it.
50	11	"Adore-able Mess"	February 6, 2020	0.38
Tyranny's ex arrives and they try to rekindle their relationship. Adore tries to figure out if Tyler could be her next, but Trenton shows up looking for answers, while La Demi wants Tyler to leave the peak because she does not want to lose him as a friend, but Callum and Georgia thinks she is too hard on him. In the end, Allie votes Carlos out in hopes of moving on with Niall.
51	12	"Breaking Winter Balls"	February 13, 2020	0.30
Despite her connection with Niall, Allie kisses her ex Cameron in the jacuzzi. Marlon goes on a date with La Demi, thus upsetting Todd. Adore moves on with Trenton.
52	13	"Liar, Liar, Chalet on Fire"	February 20, 2020	0.37
Ashley and Nicole make their relationship official. Callum buys a ring for Georgia, planning a proposal. A polygraph test reveals the truth about the cast's relationships.
53	14	"Say Yes to the Next"	February 27, 2020	0.32
The remaining singles have to make their final decisions and leave either with their next or on their own.
