= Are You the One? season 5 =

American reality television program

Are You the One?
- Season 5
- Presented by: Ryan Devlin
- No. of contestants: 22
- Location: Cabarete, Dominican Republic
- No. of episodes: 10

Release
- Original network: MTV
- Original release: January 11 – March 3, 2017

Season chronology
- ← Previous; Season 4 Next → Season 6

The fifth season of MTV's reality dating series Are You the One? premiered on January 11, 2017.

This season featured 2 big changes. When a couple gets sent into the truth booth to see if they are a perfect match, the rest of the house can either vote to see if they are a perfect match, or earn $150,000, and not see the result of the couple. This only will pertain to certain weeks. Also, if the house blacks out at a match-up ceremony, their money will decrease by 50% each time instead of $250,000.

== Cast ==
Male cast members	Age	Hometown
Andre Siemers	21	Burnsville, Minnesota
Derrick Henry	23	Charleston, South Carolina
Eddie Williams	21	Bridgeton, New Jersey
Hayden Weaver	23	Anderson, Indiana
Jaylan Adlam	23	Atlanta, Georgia
Joey Amoia	23	Buffalo, New York
Michael Halpern	24	Tamarac, Florida
Mike Cerasani	25	Staten Island, New York
Osvaldo Romero	22	Chicago, Illinois
Ozzy Morales	24	San José, Costa Rica
Tyler O'Brien	22	Boca Raton, Florida

Female cast members	Age	Hometown
Alicia Wright	23	Howell, New Jersey
Carolina Duarte	21	Sammamish, Washington
Casandra Martinez	22	Seabrook, Texas
Gianna Hammer	21	Doylestown, Ohio
Hannah Fugazzi	22	Brentwood, California
Kam Williams	21	Pennsauken, New Jersey
Kari Kowalski	22	New York, New York
Kathryn Palmer	22	Tallahassee, Florida
Shannon Duffy	22	Valencia, California
Taylor Selfridge	22	Yacolt, Washington
Tyranny Todd	22	Augusta, Georgia

== Progress ==
Guys	Ceremony									
Guys	1	2	3	4	5	6	7	8	9	10
Andre	Alicia	Hannah	Kari	Casandra	Taylor	Taylor	Casandra	Gianna	Kathryn	Kathryn
Derrick	Kathryn	Alicia	Hannah	Gianna	Tyranny	Tyranny	Kari	Shannon	Casandra	Shannon
Edward	Kam	Shannon	Kam	Alicia	Kam	Kam	Kam	Kam	Kam	Kam
Hayden	Shannon	Taylor	Carolina	Carolina	Carolina	Carolina	Carolina	Carolina	Carolina	Carolina
Jaylan	Casandra	Kam	Casandra	Tyranny	Casandra	Hannah	Tyranny	Tyranny	Tyranny	Tyranny
Joey	Carolina	Carolina	Kathryn	Kathryn	Kathryn	Kathryn	Kathryn	Casandra	Hannah	Hannah
Michael	Hannah	Gianna	Taylor	Kari	Kari	Kari	Hannah	Kathryn	Kari	Kari
Mike	Kari	Casandra	Alicia	Kam	Alicia	Alicia	Gianna	Kari	Alicia	Alicia
Osvaldo	Tyranny	Kari	Tyranny	Taylor	Gianna	Gianna	Taylor	Taylor	Taylor	Taylor
Ozzy	Gianna	Kathryn	Gianna	Hannah	Hannah	Casandra	Alicia	Alicia	Gianna	Gianna
Tyler	Taylor	Tyranny	Shannon	Shannon	Shannon	Shannon	Shannon	Hannah	Shannon	Casandra
Correct matches	2	0	4	4	4	4	4	5	9	8

Girls	Ceremony									
Girls	1	2	3	4	5	6	7	8	9	10
Alicia	Andre	Derrick	Mike	Edward	Mike	Mike	Ozzy	Ozzy	Mike	Mike
Carolina	Joey	Joey	Hayden	Hayden	Hayden	Hayden	Hayden	Hayden	Hayden	Hayden
Casandra	Jaylan	Mike	Jaylan	Andre	Jaylan	Ozzy	Andre	Joey	Derrick	Tyler
Gianna	Ozzy	Michael	Ozzy	Derrick	Osvaldo	Osvaldo	Mike	Andre	Ozzy	Ozzy
Hannah	Michael	Andre	Derrick	Ozzy	Ozzy	Jaylan	Michael	Tyler	Joey	Joey
Kam	Edward	Jaylan	Edward	Mike	Edward	Edward	Edward	Edward	Edward	Edward
Kari	Mike	Osvaldo	Andre	Michael	Michael	Michael	Derrick	Mike	Michael	Michael
Kathryn	Derrick	Ozzy	Joey	Joey	Joey	Joey	Joey	Michael	Andre	Andre
Shannon	Hayden	Edward	Tyler	Tyler	Tyler	Tyler	Tyler	Derrick	Tyler	Derrick
Taylor	Tyler	Hayden	Michael	Osvaldo	Andre	Andre	Osvaldo	Osvaldo	Osvaldo	Osvaldo
Tyranny	Osvaldo	Tyler	Osvaldo	Jaylan	Derrick	Derrick	Jaylan	Jaylan	Jaylan	Jaylan
Correct matches	2	0	4	4	4	4	4	5	9	8

After the reunion, final Perfect Matches were revealed as the following:

Guy	Girl
Andre	Kathryn
Derrick	Casandra
Edward	Kam
Hayden	Carolina
Jaylan	Tyranny
Joey	Shannon
Michael	Kari
Mike	Alicia
Osvaldo	Taylor
Ozzy	Gianna
Tyler	Hannah

Notes

- Name Unconfirmed perfect match
- Name Confirmed perfect match
- Due to the blackout in Episode 2, the whole cast lost $500,000, lowering the total money at the end to $500,000
- In Episode 9, the cast decided to take the trade offer instead of finding out if Derrick and Tyranny were a perfect match, which increased the total money at stake to $650,000
- In Episode 10, the cast decided to take the trade offer instead of finding out if Joey and Casandra were a perfect match, which increased the total money at stake to $800,000

=== Truth Booths ===
Couple	Episode	Result
Hayden & Gianna	1	Not A Match
Andre & Alicia	2	Not A Match
Ozzy & Carolina	3	Not A Match
Osvaldo & Tyranny	4	Not A Match
Edward & Kam	5	Perfect Match
Ozzy & Hannah	6	Not A Match
Andre & Taylor	7	Not A Match
Hayden & Carolina	8	Perfect Match
Derrick & Tyranny	9	Truth Booth Trade
Joey & Casandra	10	Truth Booth Trade

== Episodes ==
No. overall	No. in season	Title	Original release date	U.S. viewers (millions)
41	1	"Find Love Win Money"	January 11, 2017	0.78
42	2	"Playing the Game and Getting Played"	January 18, 2017	0.52
43	3	"Butthurt"	January 25, 2017	0.60
44	4	"Tyranny of Love"	February 1, 2017	0.64
45	5	"Sex, Lies, and Truth Booths"	February 8, 2017	0.63
Perfect Match #1: Edward & Kam
46	6	"No Bro-Code"	February 15, 2017	0.68
47	7	"Party Hard, Love Harder"	February 22, 2017	0.67
48	8	"Relationship Rehab"	March 1, 2017	0.76
Perfect Match #2: Hayden & Carolina
49	9	"Between a Rock and a Love Place"	March 8, 2017	0.63
50	10	"Eleven is the Magic Number"	March 15, 2017	0.62

== After filming ==
Derrick Henry & Casandra Martinez, Hayden Weaver & Carolina Duarte and Mike Cerasani & Alicia Wright returned for Are You The One?: Second Chances.

Alicia Wright, Andre Siemens, Derrick Henry, and Taylor Selfridge appeared on the first season of Ex on the Beach. Shannon Duffy appeared on the third season. Tyranny Todd appeared on the fourth season.

On April 22, 2020, Selfridge and her Ex on the Beach costar Cory Wharton welcomed their first daughter, Mila Mae. A Teen Mom OG special episode was planned for the occasion, but was pulled off the air after some 2012 racially insensitive tweets from Selfridge resurfaced online. On June 1, 2022, Selfridge gave birth to the couple's second daughter, Maya Grace.

On May 17, 2022, Kam Williams and The Challenge castmate Leroy Garrett welcomed son Kingston Lee.

=== Sexual assault allegations ===
In April 2021, cast member Gianna Hammer alleged that one night while filming in 2016 she was drugged by production, and then later sexually assaulted by a male cast member whose name she requested be withheld. Hammer was on the prescription drug Zoloft during filming, which she usually took in the morning. Prior to the incident, while extremely intoxicated, she was in an argument with another cast member. Lighthearted Entertainment producers pulled her aside and gave her a second dosage of Zoloft "to calm her down". Other cast members witnessed her telling producers that she was not supposed to take the drug while drinking, something her doctors advised her about. She ended up taking it after producers convinced her by saying it wasn't a high enough dosage. The assault occurred later that night while cast members were in bed, and she ended up sharing a bed with a male cast member. Other cast members had to stop the assault from happening after hearing her say "no" and "stop". In the morning, Hammer was told by production what had occurred, and then asked if she wanted the male cast member kicked off the show. In response to Hammer's questions about the producer's thoughts, she alleged they made comments such as "He flew all the way out here, we did all this testing for him, he has a perfect match in this house ... he’d have to spend the rest of the time in a hotel by himself". Hammer said she wasn't sure how to answer and said she didn't want to be reason he got kicked off the show, which producers took as a sign that she was okay with him staying in the house. Afterward, the male cast member was no longer allowed to sleep in the bedroom the other cast members used, and slept on the couch the rest of filming. Both the male cast member and Hammer were cut off from booze for the rest of the show which Hammer felt was a punishment for her. The Daily Beast, who first reported the story, says they spoke on the record to five other cast members of the season who all confirmed parts of Hammer's story.

Following filming, Hammer says she felt "disrespected" after she was never contacted by anyone from Lighthearted Entertainment production or MTV about the assault. Fellow castmate Hayden Weaver emailed their MTV representative Lauren Zins alerting her to Hammer's assault and questioning the situation, to which Zins replied via email with "I am not a magician, I can't erase the past..." Since the story was released, MTV has taken the season off of streaming platforms and stated they "take these issues very seriously and have paused production/casting to conduct an independent investigation into the allegations, the third party production company and further review our internal safety protocols." Lighthearted Entertainment has denied these allegations, and claimed that "Throughout the eight seasons of the show, no contestant has reported an incident of sexual assault to Lighthearted." They also state they plan to cooperate with full transparency with any investigation.

=== The Challenge ===
Cast member	Seasons of The Challenge	Other appearances
Alicia Wright	Vendettas	—N/a
Derrick Henry	XXX: Dirty 30, Final Reckoning	—N/a
Edward Williams	Vendettas	—N/a
Kam Williams	Vendettas, Final Reckoning, War of the Worlds, War of the Worlds 2, Double Agents	The Challenge: Champs vs. Stars (season 2), The Challenge: All Stars (season 4)
