= Are You the One? season 6 =

American reality television program

Are You the One?
- Season 6
- Presented by: Terrence J
- No. of contestants: 22
- Location: New Orleans, Louisiana
- No. of episodes: 12

Release
- Original network: MTV
- Original release: September 20 – December 6, 2017

Season chronology
- ← Previous; Season 5 Next → Season 7

The sixth season of MTV's reality dating series Are You the One? premiered on September 20, 2017. This was the first season to feature Terrence J as its host, replacing Ryan Devlin.

== Cast ==
| Male cast members | Age | Hometown |
|---|---|---|
| Anthony Martin | 22 | Inglewood, California |
| Clinton Moxam | 22 | Palm Bay, Florida |
| David Shad | 24 | San Diego, California |
| Dimitri Valentin | 26 | Playa del Rey, California |
| Ethan Cohen | 27 | Sonoma, California |
| Joe Torgerson | 23 | Portland, Oregon |
| Kareem Fathalla | 23 | Avenel, New Jersey |
| Keith Klebacher | 24 | Manchester, New Jersey |
| Malcolm Drummer | 25 | West Palm Beach, Florida |
| Michael Johnson | 21 | Knoxville, Tennessee |
| Tyler Colon | 21 | Los Angeles, California |

| Female cast members | Age | Hometown |
|---|---|---|
| Alexis Eddy † | 21 | Mannington, West Virginia |
| Alivia Hunter | 21 | Charleston, South Carolina |
| Audrey Diaz | 23 | Middletown, New York |
| Diandra Delgado | 21 | Teaneck, New Jersey |
| Geles Rodriguez | 23 | Los Fresnos, Texas |
| Jada Allen | 21 | Union City, New Jersey |
| Keyana Land | 23 | Boyertown, Pennsylvania |
| Nicole Spiller | 21 | Medway, Massachusetts |
| Nurys Mateo | 22 | Portland, Maine |
| Uche Nwosu | 23 | Grand Rapids, Michigan |
| Zoe Pugh | 22 | Scranton, Pennsylvania |

== Progress ==
| Guys | Ceremony | | | | | | | | | |
| Guys | 1 | 2 | 3 | 4 | 5 | 6 | 7 | 8 | 9 | 10 |
|---|---|---|---|---|---|---|---|---|---|---|
| Anthony | Geles | Diandra | Jada | Keyana | Nicole | Keyana | Keyana | Alivia | Uche | Alexis |
| Clinton | Uche | Uche | Uche | Uche | Jada | Geles | Geles | Geles | Geles | Geles |
| Dimitri | Diandra | Nicole | Nurys | Alexis | Uche | Diandra | Diandra | Diandra | Audrey | Nurys |
| Ethan | Jada | Jada | Alexis | Nicole | Geles | Jada | Zoe | Alexis | Nurys | Zoe |
| Joe | Zoe | Audrey | Zoe | Zoe | Zoe | Alexis | Uche | Jada | Zoe | Uche |
| Kareem | Alivia | Alivia | Alivia | Diandra | Alivia | Nurys | Nurys | Nurys | Diandra | Diandra |
| Keith | Alexis | Alexis | Diandra | Nurys | Alexis | Zoe | Jada | Audrey | Jada | Jada |
| Malcolm | Nurys | Nurys | Geles | Alivia | Diandra | Alivia | Alexis | Uche | Alexis | Alivia |
| Michael | Keyana | Keyana | Audrey | Geles | Nurys | Uche | Audrey | Keyana | Keyana | Keyana |
| Shad | Audrey | Geles | Keyana | Audrey | Audrey | Audrey | Alivia | Zoe | Alivia | Audrey |
| Tyler | Nicole | Zoe | Nicole | Jada | Keyana | Nicole | Nicole | Nicole | Nicole | Nicole |
| Correct matches | 3 | 1 | 2 | 3 | 1 | 4 | 5 | 3 | 5 | 11 |

| Girls | Ceremony | | | | | | | | | |
| Girls | 1 | 2 | 3 | 4 | 5 | 6 | 7 | 8 | 9 | 10 |
|---|---|---|---|---|---|---|---|---|---|---|
| Alexis | Keith | Keith | Ethan | Dimitri | Keith | Joe | Malcolm | Ethan | Malcolm | Anthony |
| Alivia | Kareem | Kareem | Kareem | Malcolm | Kareem | Malcolm | Shad | Anthony | Shad | Malcolm |
| Audrey | Shad | Joe | Michael | Shad | Shad | Shad | Michael | Keith | Dimitri | Shad |
| Diandra | Dimitri | Anthony | Keith | Kareem | Malcolm | Dimitri | Dimitri | Dimitri | Kareem | Kareem |
| Geles | Anthony | Shad | Malcolm | Michael | Ethan | Clinton | Clinton | Clinton | Clinton | Clinton |
| Jada | Ethan | Ethan | Anthony | Tyler | Clinton | Ethan | Keith | Joe | Keith | Keith |
| Keyana | Michael | Michael | Shad | Anthony | Tyler | Anthony | Anthony | Michael | Michael | Michael |
| Nicole | Tyler | Dimitri | Tyler | Ethan | Anthony | Tyler | Tyler | Tyler | Tyler | Tyler |
| Nurys | Malcolm | Malcolm | Dimitri | Keith | Michael | Kareem | Kareem | Kareem | Ethan | Dimitri |
| Uche | Clinton | Clinton | Clinton | Clinton | Dimitri | Michael | Joe | Malcolm | Anthony | Joe |
| Zoe | Joe | Tyler | Joe | Joe | Joe | Keith | Ethan | Shad | Joe | Ethan |
| Correct matches | 3 | 1 | 2 | 3 | 1 | 4 | 5 | 3 | 5 | 11 |

Notes

- Name Unconfirmed perfect match
- Name Confirmed perfect match

=== Truth Booths ===
| Couple | Week | Result |
|---|---|---|
| Ethan & Keyana | 1 | Not A Match |
| Anthony & Geles | 2 | Not A Match |
| Malcolm & Nurys | 3 | Not A Match |
| Dimitri & Nicole | 4 | Not A Match |
| Clinton & Uche | 5 | Not A Match |
| Keith & Alexis | 6 | Not A Match |
| Keith & Alivia | 7 | Not A Match |
| Michael & Audrey | 8 | Not A Match |
| Tyler & Nicole | 9 | Perfect Match |
| Dimitri & Jada | 10 | Not A Match |

== Episodes ==
| No. overall | No. in season | Title | Original release date | U.S. viewers (millions) |
|---|---|---|---|---|
| 51 | 1 | "Swipe Right for Love" | September 20, 2017 | 0.47 |
| 52 | 2 | "Shot Through the Heart" | September 27, 2017 | 0.54 |
| 53 | 3 | "Love in Limbo" | October 4, 2017 | 0.47 |
| 54 | 4 | "Bae-trayal" | October 11, 2017 | 0.50 |
| 55 | 5 | "Jelly AF" | October 18, 2017 | 0.40 |
| 56 | 6 | "Don't Come at Me Crazy" | October 25, 2017 | 0.57 |
| 57 | 7 | "Sinking Relation-ships" | November 1, 2017 | 0.45 |
| 58 | 8 | "Ex-tra Cray" | November 8, 2017 | 0.44 |
| 59 | 9 | "Tale of Two Players" | November 15, 2017 | 0.51 |
| 60 | 10 | "No Love in NOLA" | November 22, 2017 | 0.48 |
| 61 | 11 | "Love By The Numbers" | November 29, 2017 | 0.51 |
Perfect Match #1: Tyler & Nicole
| 62 | 12 | "Playing With Fire" | December 6, 2017 | 0.64 |

== After filming ==
Joe Torgerson appeared on the first season of Ex on the Beach. Diandra Delgado, Malcolm Drummer and Nurys Mateo appeared on the second season. Geles Rodriguez and Anthony Martin appeared on the third season.

On January 9, 2020, Alexis Eddy died from cardiac arrest in her West Virginia home at the age of 23.

Ethan Cohen appeared on season 10 of Wild 'n Out, under the pseudonym E-Money.

Uche Nwosu and Clinton Moxam got married on September 4, 2021.

=== The Challenge ===
| Cast member | Seasons of The Challenge |
|---|---|
| Nurys Mateo | Ride or Dies, Battle for a New Champion, Battle of the Eras, Cutthroat (2026) |
