= Georgia Steel =

English television personality (born 1998)

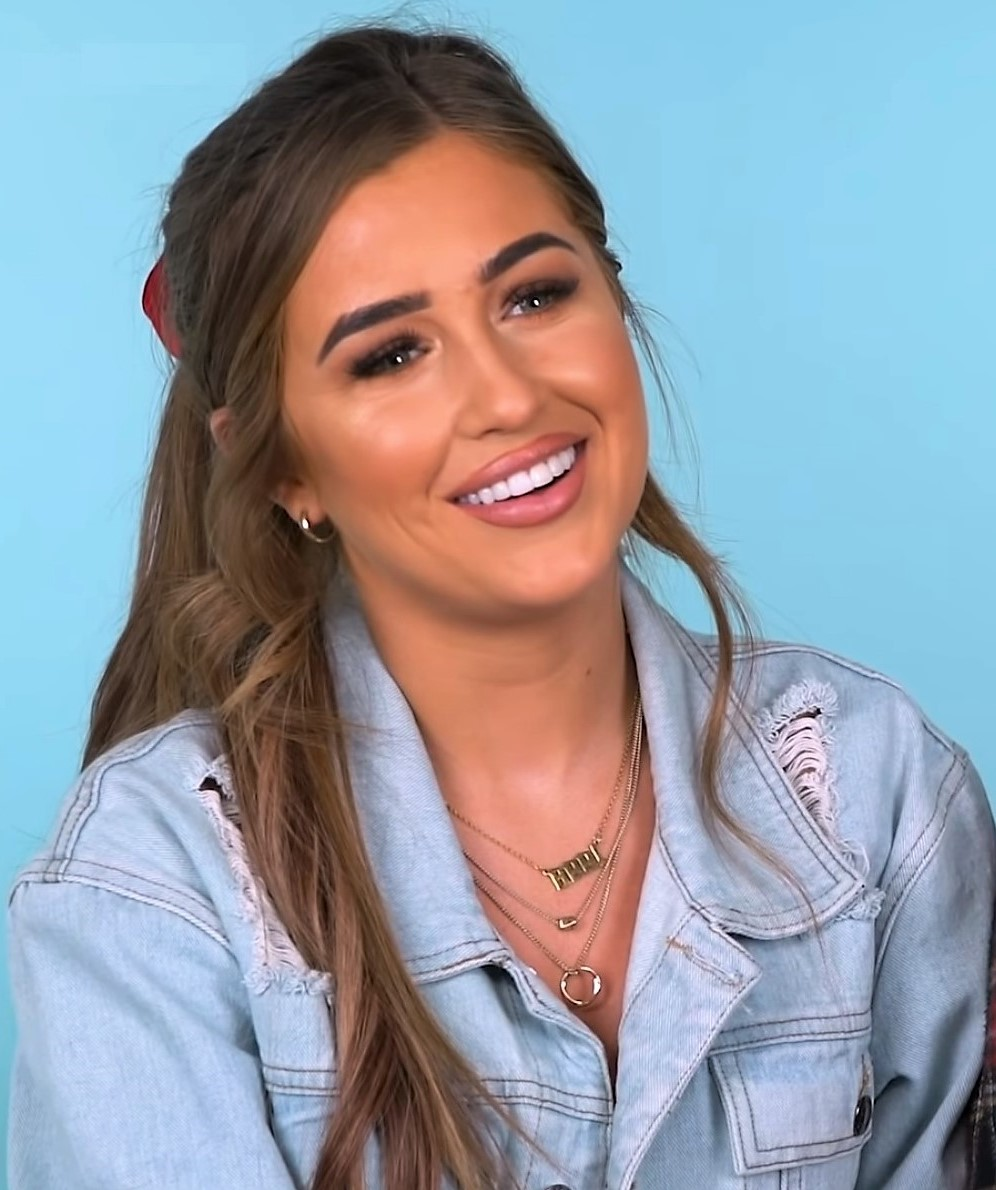
- Steel in 2019
- Born: 28 March 1998 (age 27); York, North Yorkshire, England
- Education: Academy of Live and Recorded Arts; St Mary's University
- Occupation: Television personality
- Years active: 2013–present

Georgia Steel (born 28 March 1998) is an English television personality. In 2018, she appeared on the fourth series of the ITV2 reality series Love Island. She has since made appearances in various reality television series including Celebs on the Ranch, Celebs Go Dating, Celebrity Coach Trip, Ex on the Beach: Peak of Love, Love Island Games and Love Island: All-Stars.

== Early life ==
Steel was born on 28 March 1998 in York, North Yorkshire. As a child, she was diagnosed with dyslexia. Steel studied acting at the Academy of Live and Recorded Arts and worked part-time as a barmaid. She is also a trained dancer. When Steel was cast in Love Island, she took a break from drama school, but completed her training as an actress at St Mary's University in August 2019.

== Career ==
In 2013, Steel made her television debut in two episodes of the CBBC sitcom All at Sea, portraying the role of Amanda Bryce. In 2018, Steel appeared on the fourth series of the ITV2 reality series Love Island. She finished in eighth place alongside Sam Bird, after being eliminated on Day 47. In 2019, Steel appeared in the sixth series of the E4 dating reality series Celebs Go Dating. She also appeared in the 5Star reality series Celebs on the Ranch, which aired in April 2019. In 2019, she appeared in the fifth series of the E4 series Celebrity Coach Trip. From December 2019 to February 2020, she appeared on the MTV series Ex on the Beach: Peak of Love. During filming of the show, Georgia began a serious relationship with fellow cast member Callum Izzard, whom later proposed to Georgia on the set of the show. They split in April 2020, after seven months together.

In 2023, Steel was a contestant on the Love Island Games. In 2024, Steel appeared as a contestant on the spin-off Love Island: All-Stars.

== Filmography ==
As herself
| Year | Title | Role | Notes | Ref. |
|---|---|---|---|---|
| 2013 | All at Sea | Amanda Bryce | 2 episodes | |
| 2018 | Love Island | Contestant | Series 4 | |
| 2019 | Celebs Go Dating | Contestant | Series 6 | |
| 2019 | Celebs on the Ranch | Contestant | Main cast; eliminated | |
| 2019 | Celebrity Coach Trip | Contestant | Series 5 | |
| 2019, 2020 | Hey Tracey | Participant | Quiz show; 2 episodes | |
| 2019 | MTV Cribs | Participant | 1 episode | |
| 2019 | Celebrity Antiques Road Trip | Participant | 1 episode | |
| 2019–2020 | Ex on the Beach: Peak of Love | Contestant | Main cast | |
| 2020 | Love Island: What Happened Next? | Herself | Television special | |
| 2023 | Love Island Games | Contestant | Spin-off show | |
| 2023 | The Football Fraudster | Contributor | Documentary | |
| 2024 | Love Island: All-Stars | Contestant | Spin-off | |
| 2024 | Pointless Celebrities | Contestant | Series 16, Episode 19 | |
