= Scoot Ova =

Scoot Ova is a song, video, and dance created by 4EY The Future, and R&B/Pop group out of the Washington D.C. region.

The dance spawned some YouTubers to create their own versions and was also featured as performed by the group live and via the video on VH1.com, MTV.com, WPGC CBS Local, My Fox DC, and featured on Urbanbridgez.com.
