= The Challenge: Cutthroat (2026 season) =

42nd season of the reality television series

Cutthroat
- Season 42
- Presented by: T. J. Lavin
- No. of contestants: 24
- Winners: Chris "CT" Tamburello; Johnny "Bananas" Devenanzio; Michele Fitzgerald; Tori Deal; Will Gagnon
- Location: Bangkok & Chonburi, Thailand
- No. of episodes: 14

Release
- Original network: Paramount+
- Original release: August 5 – October 28, 2026

Season chronology
- ← Previous; Vets & New Threats Next → -

The Challenge: Cutthroat is the 42nd season of the reality competition series The Challenge, featuring alumni from The Real World, The Challenge, Are You the One?, Big Brother (U.S.), Survivor (U.S.), The Amazing Race, Too Hot to Handle, Love Island (U.S.), Cheer, Married at First Sight (UK), and Deal or No Deal Island competing for a share of $500,000. The season premiered on August 5, 2026, with two episodes on Paramount+, with a same day airing of the first episode on MTV.

== Format ==
Cutthroat features 24 contestants divided into three teams determined after a draft in the first episode. At the end of episode 8, the season changed to a two-team format following the merge of two teams.

For each episode, every team has one or two captains, and the elimination is designated as either a men's or women's elimination round. (Note: For episode 12, any contestant, regardless of gender, could be nominated for the Arena.) While the format changes as the season progresses, most episodes feature a team-based daily challenge, a nomination process and an elimination round (the "Arena"). The winner of the elimination round remains in the competition while the defeated contestant is eliminated.

- Episode 1-4: The winning team and the captains of the second-place team from the daily challenge are immune from elimination. For nominations, the captains of the second-place team nominate one team member of the designated gender to potentially compete in the Arena; afterwards, the rest of the second-place team vote to nominate a second team member to potentially compete. At the Arena, the captains of the winning team receive the power to select the participants: one contestant from the last-place team, and one of the two nominees from the second-place team.
- Episode 5-8: In episode 5, the format changed and each team had to select one member as a "permanent" captain moving forward. The winning team of the daily challenge are immune from elimination, along with the captains of both losing teams. The captains of both losing teams later select one member of their team to compete in the Arena.
- Episode 9 and 11-12: At the end of episode 8, the Blue team was disbanded and merged with the Gray team, resulting in a two-team format. For episodes 9, 11 and 12, the captain of the losing team from the daily challenge nominates one team member to potentially compete in the Arena. The rest of the losing team then vote to nominate a second team member to potentially compete. Afterwards, the captain of the winning team selects two participants for the Arena: one contestant from their own team, and one of the two nominated contestants from the losing team.
- Episode 10: In episode 10, no daily challenge was held, and both captains are automatically sent to compete in a UFC-inspired Arena, called "Trial By Combat", against a Mercenary. If the captain defeats the Mercenary, they are guaranteed immunity and team captaincy until the Final Challenge, win two tickets to a live UFC event, and receive $25,000 for their team in the Final Challenge. If the captain loses, they are eliminated and the money is awarded to the Mercenary.

Once nine contestants remain, teams compete in the Final Challenge to determine the champions of the season.

Twists

- Captains: For each episode, each team has one or two team captains.
  - From episode 1–4, each team has one male and one female captain, which changes each episode. The initial captains were determined with the team draft. After each elimination, each captain must assign the captaincy to a team member of the same gender for the next episode. Captains must select a team member that hasn't been a captain before, unless otherwise impossible.
  - In episode 5, each team had to elect a single member who would become the "permanent" captain moving forward. Teams must elect a new captain if their current captain withdraws or is disqualified from the competition. The captain of the eventual winning team in the Final Challenge had to decide on whether or not to split the $500,000 prize with their team.
- Mutiny: From episode 6–9, teams can call a "Mutiny" before the daily challenge to overthrow their current captain and elect a new one. In order to do so, the decision must be unanimous among the rest of the team. Each team has two chances to use their Mutiny. The twist was discontinued after both captains won permanent captaincy in episode 10.
- Mercenaries: In episode 10, two contestants from previous seasons of The Challenge appeared as Mercenaries to compete in a special one-off elimination round against the team captains.

== Contestants ==
Male contestants	Original season	Finish
Chris "CT" Tamburello	The Real World: Paris	Winner
Johnny "Bananas" Devenanzio	The Real World: Key West	Winner
Will Gagnon	Are You the One? 9	Winner
Justin Hinsley	Cheer	Episode 12
Chris Underwood	Survivor: Edge of Extinction	Episode 9
Josh Goldstein	Love Island USA 3	Episode 8 (Note: Josh, Leo and Nelson were disqualified from the competition at the start of episode 8 for breaking the show's code of conduct. Their departures were not shown on screen.)
Leonardo "Leo" Dionicio	Love Island USA 5	Episode 8
Nelson Thomas	Are You the One? 3	Episode 8
Cory Wharton	Real World: Ex-Plosion	Episode 7 (Note: Ahead of the Arena in episode 7, Cory withdrew from the competition due to a family emergency. As a result, the upcoming male elimination round was cancelled.)
Keanu Soto	Big Brother 27	Episode 5
Brad Fiorenza	The Real World: San Diego (2004)	Episode 3
Cedric Hodges	Big Brother 26	Episode 1

Female contestants	Original season	Finish
Michele Fitzgerald	Survivor: Kaôh Rōng	Winner
Tori Deal	Are You the One? 4	Winner
Adrienne Naylor	Married at First Sight UK 8	Runner-up
Alexis Lete	Deal or No Deal Island 2	Runner-up
Cara Maria Sorbello	The Challenge: Fresh Meat II	Runner-up
Cassidy Clark	Survivor 43	Runner-up
Anna Leigh Wilson	The Amazing Race 35	Episode 11
Izzy Fairthorne	Too Hot to Handle 3	Episode 8
Deb Chubb	Love Island USA 4	Episode 6
Sydney Segal	Survivor 41	Episode 5 (Note: In episode 5, Sydney was medically removed from the competition after sustaining a knee injury during the "Jungle Brawl" challenge.)
Nurys Mateo	Are You the One? 6	Episode 4
Reilly Smedley	Big Brother 25	Episode 2

=== Team draft ===
At the start of the season, contestants had to race through Bangkok to the cast villa. The first eight contestants to arrive then had to search the villa for a box containing a key, unlock a puzzle station and solve a puzzle. The first three contestants to finish would become the initial team captains.

For the team draft, instead of selecting their own team, team captains had to select contestants for the other teams. Each team had to have an even gender split. After the teams were finalized, each captain had to select a second captain of the opposite gender from their team.

Teams (Note: After Josh and Nelson's disqualification, the Blue team had no male team members remaining. As the next episode would be a male elimination round, the Blue team was disbanded at the end of episode 8 and merged with the Gray team. The newly merged Gray team then had to elect a new captain in episode 9.)
Round	Blue Team	Gray Team	Orange Team
Captain	Anna Leigh	Chris	Justin
1	Cedric	Adrienne	Deb
2	Reilly	Sydney	Will
3	Lete	Nurys	Bananas
4	Brad	Cory	Michele
5	Nelson	Cassidy	Tori
6	Josh	Keanu	Izzy
7	Cara Maria	Leo	CT

=== Mercenaries ===
Mercenaries	Original season
Rachel Robinson	Road Rules: Campus Crawl
Sarah Rice	The Real World: Brooklyn

== Gameplay ==
=== Challenge games ===
- Right This Sway: Contestants attempt to cross a rope bridge without falling off or having their knees touch the bridge. Ten seconds into each team's run, opposing teams can pull ropes to sway the bridge, making the challenge more difficult. The team with the most members to successfully cross the bridge wins, with ties broken based on time.
  - Winners: Gray team
- If You Know, You Know: Played in two heats for each team. Each heat, two or three team members are "guessers", who are blindfolded and harnessed on a trapdoor off the side of a 50-story building. Meanwhile, one other team member enters a mystery box, where they answer several yes-no questions about themselves by pressing a green or red button. After the responses are announced, each guesser attempts to guess the teammate in the mystery box. Teams are disqualified from a heat if any team member makes noise (potentially giving away their identity), or if the team member in the mystery box strategically does not answer truthfully. The team with the most correct guesses wins. In the event of a tie, the female captains of each tied team compete in a sudden-death tiebreaker where they answer trivia questions.
  - Winners: Gray team
- Boat Swap: Each team has three boats of their team color and three white boats located at different ends of a narrow floating dock. They must paddle the boats to the opposite sides of the dock. The first team to transfer all six boats wins.
  - Winners: Orange team
- Infiltration Dive: Teams swim from shore to a platform in the sea. Afterwards, one team member at a time must swim 50 metres (55 yd) underwater to a second platform. Set up ten feet (3 m) below the surface are several "dive bells" where contestants can catch their breath. Along the way, teams also collect five puzzle pieces. Once teams collect all five puzzle pieces and have all their members reach the second platform, they must swim to shore and unlock a chest. The first team to finish wins.
  - Winners: Orange team
- Jungle Brawl: Throughout the challenge, dozens of balls are launched into a mudpit. Contestants attempt to retrieve the balls and throw them into another team's goal at the boundary of the pit, while also defending their own goal. The team with the fewest balls in their goal wins.
  - Winners: Orange team
- Trial by Terror: Teams begin on a platform above water and attempt to swing across a series of colored rings to reach a second platform without dropping. Contestants must swing across the rings in a certain order, shown by flashing colored lights at the start, with the remaining rings being decoys which drop into the water. The team with the most members across to the second platform wins, with ties broken on time.
  - Winners: Gray team
- Perfect Match: While tethered together, teams race half a mile (805 m) through the jungle towards a lake. Once there, two team members swim to retrieve two 80-pound (36 kg) puzzle pieces, which teams then carry back to the start. Teams repeat this process until they collect all ten puzzle pieces. Afterwards, the first team to assemble the puzzle wins.
  - Winners: Orange team
- Mean Cuisine: Teams select up to three members to be "shoppers" and up to four members to be "eaters". Teams with fewer than four members have each member undergo both roles. To begin, the shoppers row a boat through the Pattaya Floating Market and collect five dishes from vendors for other teams to consume, with selections made on a first-come, first-served basis. The eaters must then consume all their team's assigned dishes. The first team to finish all five dishes wins.
  - Winners: Blue team
- Devils in the Details: Each team member begins at different sections of a path leading up to a temple. The team member at the start of the path studies a sequence of ten similar statues and describes them to the team member at the next section. This member then relays the descriptions to the next team member, with this process continuing until the team member at the temple receives the information. The team member at the temple must then arrange the statues to match the original sequence. The first team to correctly replicate the sequence wins.
  - Winners: Gray team
- Feed It Through: While blindfolded, teams must maneuver three blocks, one at a time, through a giant wire bead maze set up across Jomtien Beach. The first team to transfer all three blocks and stack them on a post at the end wins.
  - Winners: Orange team
- Swing Into Action: With a one-hour time limit, teams attempt to traverse an obstacle course suspended above water, made up of eleven obstacles including a rope swing and a puzzle. If a team member falls into the water, their team must either wait for them to restart and catch up before proceeding, or leave them behind and continue with one less member. However, teams receive a one-hour penalty for each team member that does not finish the course in time, or is left behind. The team with the fastest overall time wins.
  - Winners: Gray team

=== Arena games ===
- Burn Out: Around the Arena are dozens of lights which change color every time they are pressed. Throughout the elimination, contestants attempt to switch as many lights as they can to their respective color. The first contestant to change all the lights to their color, or the contestant with the most lights of their color after five minutes, wins.
  - Played by: Bananas vs. Cedric
- Line 'Em Up: Each contestant has five lanes on a ramp, each filled with yoga balls of different colors. Moving one ball at a time, they must rearrange the balls so that each lane only contain balls of a single color. Each contestant also has one black ball which they can place in their opponent's lane to sabotage them. The first contestant to finish wins.
  - Played by: Deb vs. Reilly
- Winning Numbers: On a climbing wall are several numbers, each with two buttons above them. Each round, a random number is drawn, and contestants climb the wall to reach their respective button, with physical contact being allowed. The first contestant to press the button wins the round. The first contestant to win seven rounds wins the elimination.
  - Played by: Brad vs. Keanu
- I've Got You Pegged: Contestants must pull out 15 poles of varying lengths from a drywall block, then arrange the poles among 15 holes of varying depths so that the protruding ends of each pole are level. The first contestant to finish wins.
  - Played by: Anna Leigh vs. Nurys
- Knot So Fast: Contestants have 15 minutes to create as many knots or entanglements as they can within a spherical structure, using a 150-foot (46 m) rope. After those 15 minutes are up, contestants switch positions and must untie their opponent's knots. The first contestant to untie their opponent's knots and drag the rope across the finish line wins.
  - Played by: Keanu vs. Nelson
- Air Time: Contestants have four rowing machines, each with a balloon attached to it displaying five symbols. They must row the machines to inflate the balloons, memorise the sequence of symbols as the balloons deflate, and replicate each sequence on a nearby grid. The first contestant to correctly replicate all four sequences wins.
  - Played by: Cara Maria vs. Deb
- Slide Show: At the center of the Arena is a sliding wall. Contestants attempt to push the slider to their end of the wall to reveal an answer key, displaying 40 contestants from The Challenge, which they must replicate using photos on a nearby board. When a contestant pushes the slider to their end of the wall, their opponent's answer key also comes out of view, and vice versa. The first contestant to correctly replicate their answer key wins.
  - Played by: Cassidy vs. Izzy
- Chain Reaction: Contestants must transfer six large boxes under a chain cargo net to the other side of the Arena. Afterwards, they must arrange the boxes into a frame, which only fit in a certain configuration. The first contestant to finish wins.
  - Played by: Chris vs. Justin
- Pole Wrestle: Contestants begin at the center of a ring with both hands on a pole. The first contestant to wrestle the pole out of their opponent's hands in three out of five rounds wins.
  - Played by: Adrienne vs. Rachel
- Balls In: Each round, contestants play both "offense" and "defense" once. The offense contestant has one attempt to run past their opponent and deposit a ball into a goal at the center of a ring, while the defense contestant attempts to stop them by blocking them and knocking the ball out of bounds. Contestants then switch roles and repeat this process. The contestant with the most balls scored after five rounds wins.
  - Played by: Sarah vs. Tori
- Back Up Off Me: Contestants begin strapped together back-to-back at the center of the Arena. The first contestant to drag or push their opponent onto or across the surrounding rope boundary wins.
  - Played by: Anna Leigh vs. Tori
- Pressure Puzzles: Contestants must enter three puzzle chambers and solve each puzzle inside. For each puzzle, the first contestant to solve it triggers a powder-filled balloon to inflate and eventually burst in their opponent's corresponding chamber, potentially distracting them. The first contestant to solve all three puzzles wins.
  - Played by: Justin vs. Lete

=== Final Challenge ===
Day one

Teams complete five checkpoints to obtain five components for a power source, and bring them one at a time to their team's compound one mile (1.6 km) away. To reach each checkpoint, teams must solve (or eventually time-out on) two puzzles at a "House of Puzzles" to obtain a key and unlock a door revealing a trail to the checkpoint site. The winners of day one receive an advantage for day two.

If a contestant requires medical attention, their team may proceed without them until they are cleared to compete again. With conditions reaching 92 °F (33 °C) and 100% humidity, teams may spend time visiting an off-course "triage station" to recover, which contains resources including food and an ice bath. Additionally, hidden within the course is a briefcase from UFC containing a mystery prize ($25,000).

Teams may complete the checkpoints in any order:

- Green Checkpoint: Teams must assemble a multi-layer puzzle to match a given design. For the second puzzle, six pairs of pegs are connected by ropes and arranged in a circle such that all six ropes are tangled together. To release their key, teams must untangle the ropes and remove the pegs, moving a maximum of two pegs at a time. Along the trail to the checkpoint, teams must also swim across a lake. For the checkpoint, teams must balance on barrels for five minutes, with the time restarting if any team member loses balance.
- Purple Checkpoint: Teams must assemble a puzzle on a semi-circle platform and have the puzzle freely balance for ten seconds. They must then collect 45 keys from a box using wire rods, and open 45 locks to obtain their door key. For the checkpoint, teams must roll a large sphere down the path and onto a dirt hill.
- Red Checkpoint: Teams must assemble a tangram puzzle within a vertical frame. They must then solve a lock-shaped puzzle requiring them to slide blocks and create a path which releases their key from a frame. For the checkpoint, each team member must consume a certain drink, with one team member receiving a spicy drink while the rest of their team receive a refreshing fruit drink.
- White Checkpoint: Teams must solve a puzzle within a frame, and have the single white piece fit in the middle. Teams must then use ropes attached to a hook to pick up five blocks and stack them without falling to obtain their key. For the checkpoint, teams must carry ladders uphill and use them to collect objects hanging from a rope, and are only allowed to use each ladder once.
- Yellow Checkpoint: Teams must arrange nine tiles, each with four numbers on them, into a grid so that adjacent tiles have edges with matching numbers. They must then slot poles of varying lengths through holes of a cube, and have all the poles fit inside to obtain their key. For the checkpoint, teams must carry concrete blocks to a marked zone and stack them, with team members only allowed to take one block at once.

Overnight Stage: Teams must have one member watch the surroundings from a watchtower above their team compound for the entire night. Additionally, each team must fill three canisters with hundreds of metal pellets by sunrise, with only one member completing this at a time. Team members can swap out as desired, and non-participating team members can rest in the compound during this time.

Day two

Teams must assemble their power source using the components they collected. They must then race ten miles (16 km) through the jungle, collect five gear-shaped puzzle pieces along the way and use them to solve a puzzle at the end of the route. The winning team from day one receive a ten-minute headstart. The first team to solve the puzzle and press a button to "activate" their power source are declared the champions of Cutthroat and receive $500,000, with the money distribution to be decided by their captain.

- Winners: Orange Team – $550,000 (including $25,000 from the "Trial By Combat" in episode 10, and $25,000 for finding the hidden UFC briefcase during the Final Challenge)
  - Captain's decision: Tori ($110,004); Bananas, CT, Michele, Will ($109,999 each)
- Runners-up: Gray Team – $25,000 (from the "Trial By Combat" in episode 10)
  - Captain's decision: Adrienne ($10,000); Cara Maria (Note: After the captain's prize money distribution was announced, Cara Maria gave the $5,000 she was awarded back to Adrienne, as she was already satisfied with the UFC tickets won from the "Trial By Combat" in episode 10.), Lete, Cassidy ($5,000 each)

== Game summary ==
Episode		Gender	Winners	Team Captains			Arena contestants		Arena game	Arena outcome	
#	Challenge	Gender	Winners	Blue	Gray	Orange	Nominated	Winners' pick	Arena game	Winner	Eliminated
1	Right This Sway	Male	Gray Team	Anna Leigh	Chris	Justin	Bananas	Cedric	Burn Out	Bananas	Cedric
1	Right This Sway	Male	Gray Team	Nelson	Sydney	Michele	~~Will~~	Cedric	Burn Out	Bananas	Cedric
2	If You Know, You Know	Female	Gray Team	Cara Maria	Adrienne	CT	~~Anna Leigh~~	Deb	Line 'Em Up	Deb	Reilly
2	If You Know, You Know	Female	Gray Team	Josh	Keanu	Tori	Reilly	Deb	Line 'Em Up	Deb	Reilly
3	Boat Swap	Male	Orange Team	Brad	Cory	Bananas	Keanu	Brad	Winning Numbers	Keanu	Brad
3	Boat Swap	Male	Orange Team	Lete	Nurys	Deb	~~Leo~~	Brad	Winning Numbers	Keanu	Brad
4	Infiltration Dive	Female	Orange Team	Cara Maria	Cassidy	Izzy	~~Adrienne~~	Anna Leigh	I've Got You Pegged	Anna Leigh	Nurys
4	Infiltration Dive	Female	Orange Team	Nelson	Leo	Will	Nurys	Anna Leigh	I've Got You Pegged	Anna Leigh	Nurys
5	Jungle Brawl	Male	Orange Team	Josh	Cory	Tori	Keanu	—N/a	Knot So Fast	Nelson	Keanu
5	Jungle Brawl	Male	Orange Team	Josh	Cory	Tori	Nelson	—N/a	Knot So Fast	Nelson	Keanu
6	Trial by Terror	Female	Gray Team	Josh	Cory	Tori	Cara Maria	—N/a	Air Time	Cara Maria	Deb
6	Trial by Terror	Female	Gray Team	Josh	Cory	Tori	Deb	—N/a	Air Time	Cara Maria	Deb
7	Perfect Match	Male	Orange Team	Josh	Cory	Tori	—N/a				
8	Mean Cuisine	Female	Blue Team	Anna Leigh	Chris (Note: After Cory's withdrawal from the competition, the Gray team had to elect a new captain at the end of episode 7. The decision ended in a "stalemate" as the vote was a tie, with no one changing their vote. The team were then given an additional night to consider the decision. During this time, Leo was disqualified from the competition, and did not participate in the revote held in the next episode.)	Tori	Cassidy	—N/a	Slide Show	Cassidy	Izzy
8	Mean Cuisine	Female	Blue Team	Anna Leigh	Chris	Tori	Izzy	—N/a	Slide Show	Cassidy	Izzy
9	Devils in the Details	Male	Gray Team	Disbanded	Adrienne	Tori	~~CT~~	Chris	Chain Reaction	Justin	Chris
9	Devils in the Details	Male	Gray Team	Disbanded	Adrienne	Tori	Justin	Chris	Chain Reaction	Justin	Chris
10 (Note: No daily challenge or nominations were held in episode 10. Instead, both team captains, Adrienne and Tori, were guaranteed to compete in the Arena as part of the "Trial By Combat" twist.)	—N/a	Female	—N/a	Disbanded	Adrienne	Tori	—N/a		Pole Wrestle	Adrienne	Rachel
10	—N/a	Female	—N/a	Disbanded	Adrienne	Tori	—N/a		Balls In	Tori	Sarah
11	Feed It Through	Female	Orange Team	Disbanded	Adrienne	Tori	Anna Leigh	Tori (Note: As the winning team captain in episode 11, Tori volunteered to compete in the Arena instead of selecting a member of her team, which would have been Michele by default.)	Back Up Off Me	Tori	Anna Leigh
11	Feed It Through	Female	Orange Team	Disbanded	Adrienne	Tori	~~Cara Maria~~	Tori	Back Up Off Me	Tori	Anna Leigh
12	Swing Into Action	—N/a	Gray Team	Disbanded	Adrienne	Tori	~~CT~~	Lete	Pressure Puzzles	Lete	Justin
12	Swing Into Action	—N/a	Gray Team	Disbanded	Adrienne	Tori	Justin	Lete	Pressure Puzzles	Lete	Justin
13/14	Final Challenge		Orange Team	Disbanded	Adrienne	Tori					

=== Elimination progress ===
Contestants	Episode												
Contestants	1	2	3	4	5	6	7	8	9	10	11	12	13/14
Bananas	ELIM	SAFE	WIN	WON	WON	SAFE	WON	SAFE	SAFE	SAFE	WON	SAFE	WINNER
CT	SAFE	SAFE	WON	WON	WON	SAFE	WON	SAFE	NOM	SAFE	WON	NOM	WINNER
Michele	SAVE	SAFE	WON	WON	WON	SAFE	WON	SAFE	SAFE	SAFE	WON	SAFE	WINNER
Tori	SAFE	SAFE	WON	WON	WIN	SAVE	WIN	SAVE	SAVE	ELIM	ELIM	SAVE	WINNER
Will	NOM	SAFE	WON	WIN	WON	SAFE	WON	SAFE	SAFE	SAFE	WON	SAFE	WINNER
Adrienne	WON	WIN	SAFE	NOM	SAFE	WON	SAFE	SAFE	WIN	ELIM	SAVE	WIN	LOSER
Cara Maria	SAFE	SAVE	SAFE	SAFE	SAFE	ELIM	SAFE	WON	WON	SAFE	NOM	WON	LOSER
Cassidy	WON	WON	SAFE	SAVE	SAFE	WON	SAFE	ELIM	WON	SAFE	SAFE	WON	LOSER
Lete	SAFE	SAFE	SAFE	SAFE	SAFE	SAFE	SAFE	WON	WON	SAFE	SAFE	ELIM	LOSER
Justin	SAVE	SAFE	WON	WON	WON	SAFE	WON	SAFE	ELIM	SAFE	WON	OUT	
Anna Leigh	SAFE	NOM	SAFE	ELIM	SAFE	SAFE	SAFE	WIN	WON	SAFE	OUT		
Chris	WIN	WON	SAFE	SAFE	SAFE	WON	SAFE	SAVE	OUT				
Izzy	SAFE	SAFE	WON	WIN	WON	SAFE	WON	OUT					
Josh	SAFE	SAVE	SAFE	SAFE	SAVE	SAVE	SAVE	DQ					
Leo	WON	WON	NOM	SAVE	SAFE	WON	SAFE	DQ					
Nelson	SAFE	SAFE	SAFE	SAFE	ELIM	SAFE	SAFE	DQ					
Cory	WON	WON	SAVE	SAFE	SAVE	WIN	QUIT						
Deb	SAFE	ELIM	WIN	WON	WON	OUT							
Keanu	WON	WIN	ELIM	SAFE	OUT								
Sydney	WIN	WON	SAFE	SAFE	MED								
Nurys	WON	WON	SAVE	OUT									
Brad	SAFE	SAFE	OUT										
Reilly	SAFE	OUT											
Cedric	OUT												

Key
The contestant won the Final Challenge
The contestant lost the Final Challenge
The contestant was team captain, won the daily challenge and was immune from the Arena
The contestant's team won the daily challenge, and they were immune or not selected for the Arena
The contestant was team captain on a losing team from the daily challenge, but was immune from the Arena
The contestant's team came in second in the daily challenge, was nominated for the Arena, but was not selected to compete
The contestant was not selected for the Arena
The contestant won the elimination round in the Arena
The contestant lost the Arena and was eliminated
The contestant was medically removed from the competition
The contestant withdrew from the competition
The contestant was disqualified from the competition

== Voting progress ==
	Episodes																
	1		2		3		4		5	6	8	9		11		12	
2nd place captains' vote	**Will**; 2 of 2 votes		**Reilly**; 2 of 2 votes		**Keanu**; 2 of 2 votes		**Adrienne**; 2 of 2 votes		—N/a								
2nd place team vote	**Bananas**; 4 of 7 votes (Note: The episode 1 and 3 nominations ended in a "stalemate" as the vote remained tied, with no one changing their vote. As a result, the captain of the gender not competing in the forthcoming elimination cast the tiebreaker vote.)		**Anna Leigh**; 3 of 5 votes		**Leo**; 4 of 7 votes		**Nurys**; 4 of 5 votes		—N/a								
Losing captains' vote	—N/a								**Keanu**; 1 of 1 vote	**Cara Maria**; 1 of 1 vote	**Cassidy**; 1 of 1 vote	**Justin**; 1 of 1 vote		**Anna Leigh**; 1 of 1 vote		**Justin**; 1 of 1 vote	
Losing captains' vote	—N/a								**Nelson**; Default (Note: This contestant was the only team member able to be nominated, and thus was voted into the Arena by default.)	**Deb**; 1 of 1 vote	**Izzy**; 1 of 1 vote	**Justin**; 1 of 1 vote		**Anna Leigh**; 1 of 1 vote		**Justin**; 1 of 1 vote	
Losing team's vote	—N/a											**CT**; 4 of 5 votes		**Cara Maria**; 3 of 4 votes		**CT**; 3 of 5 votes	
Winning captains' vote	**Bananas**; **Cedric**; 2 of 2 votes		**Deb**; **Reilly**; 2 of 2 votes		**Brad**; **Keanu**; 2 of 2 votes		**Anna Leigh**; **Nurys**; 2 of 2 votes		—N/a			**Chris**; **Justin**; 1 of 1 vote		**Anna Leigh**; **Tori**; 1 of 1 vote		**Justin**; **Lete**; 1 of 1 vote	
Voter	Vote																
Bananas	CT		—N/a		**Keanu**	**Brad**	—N/a		—N/a	—N/a	—N/a	CT		—N/a		CT	
CT	Bananas		—N/a		—N/a		—N/a		—N/a	—N/a	—N/a	Bananas		—N/a		Will	
Michele	Will	Bananas	—N/a		—N/a		—N/a		—N/a	—N/a	—N/a	CT		—N/a		CT	
Tori	CT		—N/a		—N/a		—N/a		—N/a	Deb	Izzy	Justin		**Anna Leigh**	**Tori**	Justin	
Will	Bananas		—N/a		—N/a		**Nurys**	**Anna Leigh**	—N/a	—N/a	—N/a	CT		—N/a		CT	
Adrienne	—N/a		**Reilly**	**Deb**	Chris		Nurys		—N/a	—N/a	—N/a	**Chris**	**Justin**	Anna Leigh		**Justin**	**Lete**
Cara Maria	—N/a		Reilly		—N/a		—N/a		—N/a	—N/a	—N/a	—N/a		N/A		—N/a	
Cassidy	—N/a		—N/a		Leo		Adrienne		—N/a	—N/a	—N/a	—N/a		Cara Maria		—N/a	
Lete	—N/a		Anna Leigh		—N/a		—N/a		—N/a	—N/a	—N/a	—N/a		Cara Maria		—N/a	
Justin	Will		—N/a		—N/a		—N/a		—N/a	—N/a	—N/a	CT		—N/a		N/A	
Anna Leigh	—N/a		Lete		—N/a		—N/a		—N/a	—N/a	—N/a	—N/a		Cara Maria			
Chris	**Bananas**	**Cedric**	—N/a		Leo		Nurys		—N/a	—N/a	Cassidy	—N/a					
Izzy	Bananas		—N/a		—N/a		**Nurys**	**Anna Leigh**	—N/a	—N/a	—N/a						
Josh	—N/a		Reilly		—N/a		—N/a		Nelson	Cara Maria							
Leo	—N/a		—N/a		Chris		Adrienne		—N/a	—N/a							
Nelson	—N/a		Anna Leigh		—N/a		—N/a		—N/a	—N/a							
Cory	—N/a		—N/a		Keanu		Sydney		Keanu	—N/a							
Deb	CT		—N/a		**Keanu**	**Brad**	—N/a		—N/a	—N/a							
Keanu	—N/a		**Reilly**	**Deb**	Chris		Nurys		—N/a								
Sydney	**Bananas**	**Cedric**	—N/a		Leo		Nurys										
Nurys	—N/a		—N/a		Keanu	Leo	N/A										
Brad	—N/a		Anna Leigh		—N/a												
Reilly	—N/a		Lete														
Cedric	—N/a																

Key
Bold indicates the winning captains vote
Italic indicates the second place captains vote (episode 1–4), or the losing captains' vote (from episode 5)
Underlined indicates a tie breaker vote
N/A indicates a contestant's vote was not shown

== Episodes ==
No. overall	No. in season	Title	Original release date
584	1	"Return to Cutthroat"	August 5, 2026
585	2	"Crying Won't Get You Off This Roof"	August 5, 2026
586	3	"Keep My Name Out Your Mouth"	August 12, 2026
587	4	"Say It to My Face"	August 19, 2026
588	5	"Down and Dirty"	August 26, 2026
589	6	"Leave Room for Jesus"	September 2, 2026
590	7	"You Need Me"	September 9, 2026
591	8	"Is This Safe?"	September 16, 2026
592	9	"A Captain's Worst Nightmare"	September 23, 2026
593	10	"Trial by Combat"	September 30, 2026
594	11	"Underwear Gate"	October 7, 2026
595	12	"Participation Trophies"	October 14, 2026
596	13	"The Final - Part 1"	October 21, 2026
597	14	"The Final - Part 2"	October 28, 2026
