= Are You the One? season 9 =

American reality television program

Are You the One?
- Season 9
- Presented by: Kamie Crawford
- No. of contestants: 22
- Location: Gran Canaria, Spain
- No. of episodes: 10

Release
- Original network: Paramount+
- Original release: January 18 – March 15, 2023

Season chronology
- ← Previous; Season 8

Are You the One? A Global Matchmaking Competition is the ninth season of the reality dating series Are You the One?. It was filmed in Gran Canaria, Spain and premiered on January 18, 2023.

Moving from MTV, this is the first season to air on Paramount+, with ITV Netherlands taking over production from Lighthearted Entertainment, and the first to feature Kamie Crawford as its host, replacing Terrence J.

== Cast ==
| Male cast members | Age | Country |
|---|---|---|
| Aqel Carson | 26 | United States |
| Brendan Mosca | 31 | Australia |
| Clay Carey | 34 | Australia |
| Eduardo Dickson Jr. | 30 | United States |
| Hamudi Hasoon | 28 | New Zealand |
| Leo Svete | 30 | United States |
| Mikey Owusu | 31 | United Kingdom |
| Nathan Grant | 27 | United Kingdom |
| Ollie Andersen | 28 | United Kingdom |
| Samuel Khan | 25 | United Kingdom |
| Will Gagnon | 26 | United States |

| Female cast members | Age | Country |
|---|---|---|
| Anissa Aguilar | 31 | United States |
| Brooke Rachman | 30 | United States |
| CC Cortez | 28 | United States |
| Courtney Rowe | 26 | United Kingdom |
| Danielle Bonaparte | 27 | United States |
| Dew Pineda | 33 | Spain |
| Jordanne Deveaux | 28 | United States |
| Julia-Ruth Smith | 27 | New Zealand |
| Mijntje Lupgens | 26 | Netherlands |
| Roz Odujebe | 27 | Ireland |
| Taylor Kelly | 26 | United States |

== Progress ==
| Guys | Ceremony | | | | | | | | |
| Guys | 1 | 2 | 3 | 4 | 5 | 6 | 7 (Note: During episode 8, Samuel withdrew from the competition due to personal reasons. At the 7th ceremony, Kamie revealed that Samuel's perfect match was Mijntje. Mijntje was then sent to the honeymoon suite alone.) | 8 | 9 |
|---|---|---|---|---|---|---|---|---|---|
| Aqel | Courtney | Anissa | Anissa | Anissa | Anissa | Mijntje | Anissa | Anissa | Anissa |
| Brendan | CC | Jordanne | Julia-Ruth | Julia-Ruth | Julia-Ruth | Julia-Ruth | Julia-Ruth | Julia-Ruth | Julia-Ruth |
| Clay | Dew | CC | CC | Brooke | Roz | Taylor | Taylor | Taylor | Taylor |
| Eduardo | Roz | Danielle | Jordanne | Jordanne | Jordanne | Dew | Dew | Jordanne | Courtney |
| Hamudi | Taylor | Mijntje | Danielle | Mijntje | Mijntje | Roz | Courtney | Courtney | Danielle |
| Leo | Brooke | Courtney | Taylor | Danielle | Danielle | Jordanne | Roz | Roz | Roz |
| Mikey | Danielle | Roz | Mijntj | CC | CC | CC | CC | Dew | Jordanne |
| Nathan | Mijntje | Julia-Ruth | Dew | Roz | Dew | Courtney | Jordanne | Danielle | CC |
| Ollie | Anissa | Brooke | Brooke | Dew | Brooke | Brooke | Brooke | Brooke | Brooke |
| Samuel | Julia-Ruth | Dew | Roz | Taylor | Taylor | Anissa | Mijntje | Mijntje | Mijntje |
| Will | Jordanne | Taylor | Courtney | Courtney | Courtney | Danielle | Danielle | CC | Dew |
| Correct matches | 0 | 2 | 4 | 2 | 3 | 3 | 6 | 6 | 11 |

| Girls | Ceremony | | | | | | | | |
| Girls | 1 | 2 | 3 | 4 | 5 | 6 | 7 | 8 | 9 |
|---|---|---|---|---|---|---|---|---|---|
| Anissa | Ollie | Aqel | Aqel | Aqel | Aqel | Samuel | Aqel | Aqel | Aqel |
| Brooke | Leo | Ollie | Ollie | Clay | Ollie | Ollie | Ollie | Ollie | Ollie |
| CC | Brendan | Clay | Clay | Mikey | Mikey | Mikey | Mikey | Will | Nathan |
| Courtney | Aqel | Leo | Will | Will | Will | Nathan | Hamudi | Hamudi | Eduardo |
| Danielle | Mikey | Eduardo | Hamudi | Leo | Leo | Will | Will | Nathan | Hamudi |
| Dew | Clay | Samuel | Nathan | Ollie | Nathan | Eduardo | Eduardo | Mikey | Will |
| Jordanne | Will | Brendan | Eduardo | Eduardo | Eduardo | Leo | Nathan | Eduardo | Mikey |
| Julia-Ruth | Samuel | Nathan | Brendan | Brendan | Brendan | Brendan | Brendan | Brendan | Brendan |
| Mijntje | Nathan | Hamudi | Mikey | Hamudi | Hamudi | Aqel | Samuel | Samuel | Samuel |
| Roz | Eduardo | Mikey | Samuel | Nathan | Clay | Hamudi | Leo | Leo | Leo |
| Taylor | Hamudi | Will | Leo | Samuel | Samuel | Clay | Clay | Clay | Clay |
| Correct matches | 0 | 2 | 4 | 2 | 3 | 3 | 6 | 6 | 11 |

Notes

- Name Unconfirmed perfect match
- Name Confirmed perfect match

=== Truth Booths ===
| Couple | Week | Result |
|---|---|---|
| Nathan & Taylor | 1 | Not A Match |
| Hamudi & Anissa | 2 | Not A Match |
| Will & Taylor | 3 | Not A Match |
| Brendan & Julia-Ruth | 4 | Perfect Match |
| Clay & CC | 5 | Not A Match |
| Ollie & Brooke | 6 | Perfect Match |
| Hamudi & Mijntje | 7 | Not A Match |
| Clay & Taylor | 8 | Perfect Match |
| Mikey & Roz | 9 | Not A Match |

== Episodes ==
| No. overall | No. in season | Title | Original release date |
|---|---|---|---|
| 89 | 1 | "How Far Would You Go For Love?" | January 18, 2023 |
| 90 | 2 | "How Far Would You Go For Love?" | January 18, 2023 |
| 91 | 3 | "Rollercoaster Relationships" | January 25, 2023 |
| 92 | 4 | "Love Is Heaven, Finding It Is Hell" | February 1, 2023 |
| 93 | 5 | "Wants And Needs" | February 8, 2023 |
Perfect Match #1: Brendan & Julia-Ruth
| 94 | 6 | "Down The Rabbit Hole" | February 15, 2023 |
| 95 | 7 | "It Takes One To Know One" | February 22, 2023 |
Perfect Match #2: Ollie & Brooke
| 96 | 8 | "Striking Out" | March 1, 2023 |
Perfect Match #3: Samuel & Mijntje
| 97 | 9 | "Kiss and Tell" | March 8, 2023 |
Perfect Match #4: Clay & Taylor
| 98 | 10 | "You Were The One" | March 15, 2023 |

== After filming ==
Julia Ruth appeared on series 10 of Married at First Sight UK

=== The Challenge ===
| Cast member | Seasons of The Challenge |
|---|---|
| Will Gagnon | Vets & New Threats, Cutthroat (2026) |
