= Are You the One? season 7 =

American reality television program

Are You the One?
- Season 7
- Presented by: Terrence J
- No. of contestants: 22
- Location: Kona, Hawaii
- No. of episodes: 14

Release
- Original network: MTV
- Original release: August 15 – November 7, 2018

Season chronology
- ← Previous; Season 6 Next → Season 8

Are You the One? Season of Fate is the seventh season of MTV's reality dating series Are You the One?. It was filmed in Kona, Hawaii, at the Hokukano Bayhouse and premiered on August 15, 2018. This season featured a change in the rules to get a date, the contestants no longer had to compete against each other to win a date. Instead Terrance would choose two people, one guy and one girl, to come up and press a button stopping a scrolling wheel of faces at random of the opposite sex. Two guys and two girls would be chosen at random to go on a four-person date to couple off as they choose. Everyone back at the house then voted whichever couple they thought most likely to be a 'Perfect Match' into the Truth Booth.

== Cast ==
Male cast members	Age	Hometown
Andrew Couture	24	Reading, Massachusetts
Brett Ferri	26	Manhattan, New York
Cam Viney	24	Elkins, West Virginia
Daniel Vilk	22	Brooklyn, New York
Kwasi Opoku	24	Woodbridge, New Jersey
Lewis Belt	23	Oakland, California
Moe Elkhalil	22	Houston, Texas
Shamoy Persad	23	St. Thomas, U.S. Virgin Islands
Tevin Grant	22	Scottsdale, Arizona
Tomas Buenos	22	Miami, Florida
Zak Jones	23	Dallas, Texas

Female cast members	Age	Hometown
Asia Woodley	22	Corona, California
Bria Hamilton	22	Vacaville, California
Cali Trepp	24	Chicago, Illinois
Jasmine Rodriguez	21	Williamstown, New Jersey
Kayla Umagat	22	Seattle, Washington
Kenya Scott	23	Queens, New York
Lauren Roush	23	Mason, West Virginia
Maria Elizondo	21	West New York, New Jersey
Morgan Fletcher	21	Silver Spring, Maryland
Nutsa Sikharulidze	21	Toms River, New Jersey
Samantha McKinnon	22	Chicago, Illinois

== Progress ==
Guys	Ceremony									
Guys	1	2	3	4	5	6	7	8	9	10
Andrew	Lauren	Morgan	Lauren	Nutsa	Samantha	Lauren	Lauren	Samantha	Cali	Cali
Brett	Cali	Asia	Cali	Kayla	Nutsa	Nutsa	Nutsa	Nutsa	Bria	Nutsa
Cam	Kayla	Kayla	Kayla	Asia	Kayla	Kayla	Cali	Lauren	Morgan	Bria
Daniel	Nutsa	Nutsa	Samantha	Lauren	Bria	Samantha	Samantha	Asia	Lauren	Jasmine
Kwasi	Asia	Lauren	Jasmine	Bria	Jasmine	Asia	Asia	Jasmine	Nutsa	Lauren
Lewis	Samantha	Jasmine	Asia	Kenya	Lauren	Bria	Bria	Bria	Asia	Samantha
Moe	Jasmine	Bria	Nutsa	Samantha	Asia	Jasmine	Jasmine	Kayla	Kayla	Kayla
Shamoy	Maria	Maria	Maria	Maria	Maria	Maria	Maria	Maria	Maria	Maria
Tevin	Kenya	Kenya	Kenya	Jasmine	Kenya	Kenya	Kenya	Kenya	Kenya	Kenya
Tomas	Morgan	Cali	Bria	Cali	Cali	Cali	Kayla	Morgan	Jasmine	Asia
Zak	Bria	Samantha	Morgan	Morgan	Morgan	Morgan	Morgan	Cali	Samantha	Morgan
Correct matches	3	3	3	2	4	4	4	4	4	11

Girls	Ceremony									
Girls	1	2	3	4	5	6	7	8	9	10
Asia	Kwasi	Brett	Lewis	Cam	Moe	Kwasi	Kwasi	Daniel	Lewis	Tomas
Bria	Zak	Moe	Tomas	Kwasi	Daniel	Lewis	Lewis	Lewis	Brett	Cam
Cali	Brett	Tomas	Brett	Tomas	Tomas	Tomas	Cam	Zak	Andrew	Andrew
Jasmine	Moe	Lewis	Kwasi	Tevin	Kwasi	Moe	Moe	Kwasi	Tomas	Daniel
Kayla	Cam	Cam	Cam	Brett	Cam	Cam	Tomas	Moe	Moe	Moe
Kenya	Tevin	Tevin	Tevin	Lewis	Tevin	Tevin	Tevin	Tevin	Tevin	Tevin
Lauren	Andrew	Kwasi	Andrew	Daniel	Lewis	Andrew	Andrew	Cam	Daniel	Kwasi
Maria	Shamoy	Shamoy	Shamoy	Shamoy	Shamoy	Shamoy	Shamoy	Shamoy	Shamoy	Shamoy
Morgan	Tomas	Andrew	Zak	Zak	Zak	Zak	Zak	Tomas	Cam	Zak
Nutsa	Daniel	Daniel	Moe	Andrew	Brett	Brett	Brett	Brett	Kwasi	Brett
Samantha	Lewis	Zak	Daniel	Moe	Andrew	Daniel	Daniel	Andrew	Zak	Lewis
Correct matches	3	3	3	2	4	4	4	4	4	11

Notes

- Name Unconfirmed perfect match
- Name Confirmed perfect match

=== Truth Booths ===
Couple	Week	Result
Tomas & Maria	1	Not A Match
Andrew & Asia	2	Not A Match
Shamoy & Maria	3	Perfect Match
Brett & Kenya	4	Not A Match
Zak & Bria	5	Not A Match
Brett & Cali	6	Not A Match
Zak & Nutsa	7	Not A Match
Tevin & Kenya	8	Perfect Match
Cam & Samantha	9	Not A Match
Brett & Nutsa	10	Perfect Match

== Episodes ==
No. overall	No. in season	Title	Original release date	U.S. viewers (millions)
63	1	"Leap of Fate"	August 15, 2018	0.48
22 singles arrive in Hawaii searching for their perfect match.
64	2	"Flirt at Your Own Risk"	August 15, 2018	0.449
The whole house gets involved when Bria reacts to Zak's flirtatious ways, and Tevin and Kenya's pasts threatens their future together.
65	3	"With Frenemies Like These..."	August 22, 2018	0.54
Zak explores his options while the women fight each other for his attention. Kenya and Jasmine officially become enemies.
66	4	"A Boyfriend by Any Other Name"	August 29, 2018	0.48
Asia is hurt when she learns what her friend and her crush did behind her back. Cali and Brett's budding romance is jeopardized by their own bad dating habits. Perfect Match #1: Shamoy & Maria
67	5	"Ex-tracurricular Activities"	September 5, 2018	0.45
The house is shook when their exes show up to spend some quality time. Tension soars when one ex threatens to break up a power couple and another gets aggressive. Zak is torn between Bria and Morgan.
68	6	"Spilling the Tea"	September 12, 2018	0.47
Kwasi starts drama when he lets slip what Tevin and Jasmine did the night before. Bria is angered by Morgan and Zak's developing relationship. The house makes some risky choices in picking their matches.
69	7	"He Loves Me Not"	September 19, 2018	0.42
Cam starts to question his relationship with Kayla. Daniel's fun and games pushes Sam away. The house faces their most important Truth Booth yet.
70	8	"Beast Mode"	September 19, 2018	0.36
Tensions erupt between Cam and Kwasi when Kwasi makes moves on Kayla. Asia explodes when she thinks certain people in the house are being shady. Zak has a choice to make.
71	9	"I Want You to Want Me"	September 26, 2018	0.46
Nutsa crushes on Brett while Brett's inability to get over Cali has consequences for the entire house. Moe is pushed to start playing the game. Lewis reveals his true feelings to Asia.
72	10	"Master Plan"	October 3, 2018	0.43
Bria's obsession with Zak and Zak's player ways threaten the house's ability to play the game. Cali comes up with a plan to find out which of the power couples are a Perfect Match and which are not.
73	11	"Once Upon a Crazy Party Time"	October 10, 2018	0.422
At a wild party, questionable behavior turns best friends into best enemies. Tevin and Kenya get ready to learn their fate. Moe is pushed to step up his game.
74	12	"Caught on Kiss Cam"	October 17, 2018	0.47
Kwasi and Jasmine's connection is put in jeopardy when a familiar foe makes a move on their relationship. Power couples try to make new connections. Perfect Match #2: Tevin & Kenya
75	13	"This is Nuts-a"	October 24, 2018	0.48
Brett is put on the hot seat when he second guesses his feelings for Nutsa. The house is in crisis mode as they scramble to figure out the perfect matches.
76	14	"It All Comes Down To This"	November 7, 2018	0.48
Asia attempts to sabotage Sam's relationship with Daniel; the house gets one final chance to win love and money and an extra day to deal with the fallout. Perfect Match #3: Brett & Nutsa

== After filming ==
Tevin Grant and Kenya Scott appeared on the third season of the MTV dating show Ex on the Beach.

Maria Elizondo appeared on Double Shot at Love with DJ Pauly D and Vinny.

Cali Trepp and Tomas Buenos got married in June 2022.
