= Cheyenne Parker (model) =

American television personality, model, fashion designer

- Born: June 9, 1987 (age 37)
- Occupations: Reality television personality; model; business owner
- Television: Fire Island; Ex on the Beach

Cheyenne Parker (born June 9, 1987) is an American television personality, model, fashion designer, and business owner. He appeared on reality television programs Fire Island and Ex on the Beach. Following those appearances he has continued to work as a model and has launched a clothing brand and luxury concierge service.

== Career ==
Having established a career as a model, and having appeared on an episode of Shahs of Sunset in 2012, Parker was invited to join the cast of Fire Island in 2017 but initially declined. He subsequently agreed to join the cast, and then appeared on season two of Ex on the Beach.

He has modeled for magazines such as DNA.

In 2019, he launched Maison Parker (which translates to "House of Parker" in French) a furniture design business which has since expanded to include fashion design. In 2021 he established Leisure in Life, a luxury concierge service in Mexico.

== Personal life ==
Parker is openly gay and is an advocate for the LGBTQ+ community. He had planned to return to the United States in 2021 after a period working abroad, but a COVID-19 scare resulted in him re-routing to Mexico. He now resides at Puerto Vallarta, a Mexican "queer resort".

== Filmography ==
Year	Title	Role	Note
2012	Shahs of Sunset	S1E4 Reza's blind date	
2017	Fire Island	Main cast, 7 episodes	
2018-2019	Ex on the Beach	Main cast (season 2)	
