= Fire Island (TV series) =

American reality television series

Coordinates: 40.663372°N 73.070554°W

- Genre: Reality
- Starring: Khasan Brailsford; Jorge Bustillos; Cheyenne Parker; Justin Russo; Patrick McDonald; Brandon Osorio
- Country of origin: United States
- Original language: English
- No. of episodes: 7

Production
- Executive producers: Mark Consuelos; Kelly Ripa; Albert Bianchini; Lenid Rolov
- Running time: 42 minutes
- Production company: Milojo Productions

Original release
- Network: Logo TV (Preview: VH1)
- Release: April 21 – June 1, 2017

Fire Island is an American reality television series from the LGBT-interest network Logo that began airing on April 27, 2017. It is produced by Kelly Ripa, Mark Consuelos, Albert Bianchini, and Lenid Rolov. The show was not renewed for a second season.

== Synopsis ==
Six gay men share a beachfront house for the summer on Fire Island.

== Cast ==
- Khasan Brailsford, a dancer and choreographer who has performed with artists like Beyoncé, Lady Gaga, P!nk, and Jennifer Lopez
- Jorge Bustillos, Khasan's best friend, a marketing strategist who left a career as a doctor in Venezuela
- Cheyenne Parker, an entrepreneur and model
- Justin Russo, an artist and illustrator
- Patrick McDonald, a Fire Island bartender
- Brandon Osorio, a New York University student and aspiring photographer

== Production ==
Fire Island is produced by Kelly Ripa, Mark Consuelos, Albert Bianchini, and Lenid Rolov. Ripa and Consuelos said of the show, "We fell in love with Fire Island years ago the minute we stepped off the ferry. We’re excited to share the long-standing magic of the island with this new series and to be working again with our Logo family."

Logo ordered the series from Ripa and Consuelos in July 2016. Taped in Summer 2016, Fire Island's cast members were announced on March 6, 2017. Saturday Night Live subsequently parodied the series in a skit about a lesbian reality show called Cherry Grove.

The beachfront house used in the series is located at 150 Ocean Front Walk in Fire Island Pines. The listing by Fire Island Properties describes it as "4 bedroom – 4 bath ocean front home is complete with 2 fireplaces, gunite pool and hot tub. All bedrooms have private bathroom." Per Newsday, the listing price for a July to August season in 2017 was $155,000.

== Broadcast ==
A 90-second teaser trailer was released for Fire Island in on March 6, 2017. On March 14, 2017, Logo announced an April 27 premiere date for the series.

The first episode was previewed in the US on VH1 on April 21, 2017, at 9 pm after RuPaul's Drag Race. Fire Island premiered on Logo at 8 pm on April 27, 2017, with the first two episodes back-to back.

== Reception ==
Following the release of a 90-second teaser for Fire Island, a March 2017 op-ed by personal trainer Jason Wimberly in The Advocate suggested that the series "contributes to gay America's moral decline" by glamorizing behavior that negatively impacts the perception of the LGBT community. Fire Island cast members defended the series, calling it "lighthearted" and noting that "we're not harming anyone", and cast members from MTV's controversial reality series Jersey Shore commented that "bad press is good press" and advised the Fire Island cast to "take the criticism with a grain of salt".

== Episodes ==
No.	Title	Original release date	US viewers
1	"Welcome to Fire Island!"	April 21, 2017	208,000 (VH1)
Dancer and choreographer Khasan invites five friends to stay with him at a Fire Island beach house for the summer. The first evening, Justin and Patrick stay behind to cook dinner for the group while the others go to a tea dance, and Justin is annoyed when the housemates come back late. The next day, they explore the island and attend the Pines Party. As the weekend winds down, the group hosts a barbeque, but Jorge feels disrespected when Patrick's friends start getting naked and are unapologetic about it.
2	"The More, The Merrier"	April 27, 2017	TBD
Justin and Khasan invite their boyfriends to Fire Island for the weekend, and Jorge is worried how he will react to his best friend Khasan having less time for him. Cheyenne is hesitant to attend an underwear party with the others because he has just begun a relationship. The next day, a quiet gathering of the housemates in the hot tub becomes a full-on party when Patrick arrives with a never-ending group of friends that fills the house. An annoyed Cheyenne storms out. The next day, the housemates attend Justin's art show at a local gallery—except for Cheyenne, who had promised to help Justin set up. The group arrives back at the house to find Cheyenne, who has returned from Connecticut with his new boyfriend Kyle.
3	"Not In The Face"	May 4, 2017	TBD
Cheyenne tries to make things up to the housemates by having a family dinner of his own, but Patrick shows up with some coworkers. Brandon hooks up with Jallen, one of Patrick's friends. Jorge is hurt by a lack of attention from his long term boyfriend, who is closeted back in Venezuela. Patrick competes in a drag beauty pageant, and is annoyed when Cheyenne fails to show up.
4	"Let's Go To Tea"	May 11, 2017	TBD
The housemates throw a party, and Brandon begins pulling away from Jallen.
5	"I Love My Boys"	May 18, 2017	TBD
Patrick interferes with Brandon and Jallen's evaporating relationship. Justin's parents and Khasan's mother come to the island. Khasan introduces his boyfriend to his mother.
6	"Mercury is in Retrograde"	May 25, 2017	TBD
Patrick invites his ex-boyfriend Chris Salvatore to the house, causing friction with Cheyenne.
7	"New Day, New Rosé"	June 1, 2017	TBD
Khasan choreographs a Betty Who performance on the island, and Patrick drops a bombshell in Cheyenne's direction.
