= 4EY The Future =

American R&B and pop indie group

4EY The Future is an American R&B and pop indie group. Consisting of members Demetrius Mechie, Kenny Iko, and Leo Amari, the group formed out of the Washington, D.C. metropolitan area (called the DMV for District of Columbia, Maryland, Virginia).

The group gained their most popularity after spinning a dance craze online with a viral video from their song Scoot Ova, which has been copied and featured across the web from YouTube viewers posting their versions, to MTV.com and also Soul Train's website where the trio was interviewed in March 2015. They also came out with another single called "No Time to Waste FT Wale". That music video was shot in the Los Angeles area.

The group made appearances at the B.E.T. Experience, the Verizon Center, My Fox DC and WPCG CBS Local, as well as at the Washington Wizards game.

Demetrius Harris is popularly known by his stage/social networking name Mechiesocrazy or Mechie. He started marketing himself by hosting parties in his area, then later opened up for top acts such as Meek Mill at Lincoln University, Chrisette Michelle and more.

Michael Timmons, AKA Kenny Iko, is a native of Washington D.C., and was a featured artist for the 93.9 WKYS DMV top Artist Contest and was the second runner up. Nationally he has performed for 106 & Park on B.E.T. and Blaze the Stage.
