= The Challenge: War of the Worlds 2 =

34th season of the reality television series

War of the Worlds 2
- Season 34
- Presented by: T. J. Lavin
- No. of contestants: 32
- Winners: Chris "CT" Tamburello; Dee Nguyen; Jordan Wiseley; Rogan O'Connor
- Location: Chiang Mai and Phuket, Thailand
- No. of episodes: 18 (including the two-part Reunion special)

Release
- Original network: MTV
- Original release: August 28 – December 18, 2019

Season chronology
- ← Previous; War of the Worlds Next → Total Madness

The Challenge: War of the Worlds 2 is the 34th season of the MTV reality competition series The Challenge, and the sequel to the show's 33rd season, War of the Worlds, which aired in the spring of 2019. This season features alumni from The Real World, The Challenge, Are You the One?, Big Brother, Celebrity Big Brother UK, Love Island UK, Survivor Turkey, American Ninja Warrior, Vanderpump Rules, Geordie Shore, Ex on the Beach (U.S. and UK), Shipwrecked, Survival of the Fittest, and BKCHAT LDN competing for a share at a $1 million prize. The season premiered on August 28, 2019 and concluded its run on December 18 of the same year with a two-hour reunion special.

== Format ==
For War of the Worlds 2 the players are divided into two teams (Team USA and Team UK) with teams initially based on the participants' respective home country. The main elements of the game are as follows.

- Daily Missions: Each round the teams compete in the daily challenge. The winning team gains the power to elect the speaker of the Tribunal among themselves, the speaker then selects two other teammates (one male and one female) to form the Tribunal, while the losing team must participate in Nominations.
- Nominations: Following the daily challenge, the players from the losing team must nominate one player of the designated gender to compete in the elimination round. The team is given a chance to discuss the nominations, with players allowed to name potential nominees before voting between them publicly.
- Tribunal: Each round a Tribunal consisting of three players from the winning team of the daily challenge is formed. The Tribunal players are the only players completely safe from entering the elimination. No player is allowed to be part of two consecutive Tribunals. The Tribunal witnesses the Nominations and then interrogates the Losing Team's nominee.
- Eliminations (The Proving Ground): At "The Proving Ground", the members of the Tribunal each vote for the second player to enter the Proving Ground - this nominee may come from either team. The two nominees then must face each other in the Proving Ground. The loser is eliminated from the game while the winner stays in the game and is given the opportunity to change allegiance and swap team. However, once a player swaps, they may not swap back.

At the end of the game, those who remained competed in their teams in the Final Challenge. A Purge was held during the Final Challenge, leaving only 4 players from each team to compete for the Grand Prize. The winning team equally split the $1,000,000 grand prize.

=== Twists ===
- The Reinforcements: Four Reinforcements (Chris "CT" Tamburello, Dee Nguyen, Natalie "Ninja" Duran, and Turabi "Turbo" Çamkıran) arrived following the first challenge. The winning team of the first daily challenge will have first picks on one male and one female to join their team, with the remaining players joining the losing team.
- Double Elimination: Episode 8 featured a Double Elimination Round in which both a male and a female player were eliminated. The losing team had to nominate a male and female player, and the Tribunal also nominate a male and female player.
- Purge: Some challenges are designated as a Purge challenge - sudden death challenges where the losers are immediately eliminated.
  - The "Puzzling Swim" daily challenge was a Purge challenge. The slowest pairing in the swimming portion of the challenge was instantly eliminated.
  - As the final leg of the Final Challenge only allowed for four members on each team, the players competed in a mid-final purge to narrow each team to four players.
- Instant Elimination: Following the "Mine The Cart" challenge, the players participated in instant nominations for an Elimination Round to be held immediately following the challenge.

== Contestants ==
Male contestants	Original season	Finish
Chris "CT" Tamburello	The Real World: Paris	Winner
Jordan Wiseley	The Real World: Portland	Winner
Rogan O'Connor	Ex on the Beach UK 2	Winner
Paulie Calafiore	Big Brother 18	Runner-up
Zach Nichols	The Real World: San Diego (2011)	Runner-up
Leroy Garrett	The Real World: Las Vegas (2011)	Finalist
Josh Martinez	Big Brother 19	Episode 13
Joss Mooney	Ex on the Beach UK 1	Episode 13
Theo Campbell	Love Island UK 3	Episode 11
Turabi "Turbo" Çamkıran	Survivor Turkey 8	Episode 10 (Note: Prior to the "Incoming" challenge in episode 10, Turbo was disqualified from the competition after multiple near-violent altercations with Jordan.)
Idris Virgo	Love Island UK 4	Episode 9
Kyle Christie	Geordie Shore 8	Episode 8
Stephen Bear	Celebrity Big Brother UK 18	Episode 7
Johnny "Bananas" Devenanzio	The Real World: Key West	Episode 5
Wes Bergmann	The Real World: Austin	Episode 3
Sean Lineker	Shipwrecked: Battle of the Islands	Episode 1

Female contestants	Original season	Finish
Dee Nguyen	Geordie Shore 17	Winner
Cara Maria Sorbello	The Challenge: Fresh Meat II	Runner-up
Natalie "Ninja" Duran	American Ninja Warrior 8	Runner-up
Ashley Mitchell	Real World: Ex-Plosion	Finalist
Kam Williams	Are You the One? 5	Finalist
Tori Deal	Are You the One? 4	Finalist
Nany Gonzalez	The Real World: Las Vegas (2011)	Episode 14
Kayleigh Morris	Ex on the Beach UK 2	Episode 13
Jenny West	Survival of the Fittest	Episode 12
Georgia Harrison	Love Island UK 3	Episode 10
Esther Falana	BKCHAT LDN	Episode 8
Nicole Bass	Ex on the Beach UK 6	Episode 6
Laurel Stucky	The Challenge: Fresh Meat II	Episode 4 (Note: During the "Branched Out" elimination, Laurel rang the bell first and was declared the winner. While Laurel celebrated, Ninja noticed that Laurel had misplaced one of her pegs. Ninja returned to her tower and, with all of her pegs placed in their respective slots, climbed to the top and rang her bell, thus eliminating Laurel.)
Tula "Big T" Fazakerley	Shipwrecked: Battle of the Islands	Episode 2
Faith Stowers	Vanderpump Rules	Episode 2 (Note: Faith quit the competition prior to the "Firestarter" elimination due to personal reasons following a verbal altercation involving Bear, Kyle and Theo.)
Zahida Allen	Ex on the Beach UK 6	Episode 2 (Note: Zahida quit the competition prior to the "Cryptic Crossbow" challenge due to a family emergency back at home.)

== Gameplay ==
=== Challenge games ===
- Trench Warfare: Teams must race through a hallway, grab their national flag at the opposite end, reach the other side of their sandbag walls and plant the flags. Each player is responsible for two flags, and can only carry one at a time. The first team to plant all 28 flags wins.
  - Winners: Team USA
- Cryptic Crossbow: Challengers swim to collect 16 letters attached to buoys, which will create a four-word puzzle. One team member is then launched from a giant crossbow to swim and retrieve a cryptex puzzle and solve it using their four-word puzzle solutions. The team that opens their cryptex first wins.
  - Winners: Team USA
- Paddlewheel Puzzle: After memorizing four-digit codes, players enter a rotating paddlewheel to collect 16 separate puzzle pieces which can be unlocked by entering one of the codes. Challengers then assemble those puzzle pieces into either an American or British flag. The fastest team to correctly build their puzzle wins the challenge.
  - Winners: Team USA (Note: Team UK had the fastest time on the Paddlewheel Puzzle challenge. However, Theo was caught breaking off one of the locks to a puzzle piece rather than unlocking it. Therefore, Team UK was disqualified and Team USA won by default.)
- Relic Runner: Played in two rounds. Giant, heavy relics must be transferred from the bottom of the hill to the very top by one team, while the other team is situated at the top with giant balls, a slingshot, water cannon, and a human hamster wheel to bomb the team that's running the relics up. Each player is responsible for two relics, and can only carry one at a time, guaranteeing two trips up the hill for everyone. If a player drops their relic, they have to start from the very beginning. Whichever team finishes in the fastest time wins.
  - Winners: Team UK
- Hooked: Each player has to jump to a zip line and ride it to the water, then swim around a buoy and reach a boat. The team with the fastest average time wins.
  - Winners: Team USA
- Explosive Decisions: Both teams select their six smartest players to be asked a series of trivia questions while sitting on an ejection seat that will make them fly in the air if the answer is wrong. The player is awarded a point only if his or her adversary is wrong. The first team to reach a total of six points wins.
  - Winners: Team USA
- Resilient River Run: Each team has to assemble a pyramid, transport it down a river and use it to transfer two relics (carrying one at a time). Whichever team finishes in the fastest time wins.
  - Winners: Team USA
- Crate Expectations: Both teams are given 125 crates which they must use to build towers to climb and retrieve 12 hanging relics. Once all relics have been collected, they must transport all their crates past the finish line. The first team to pass the finish line with all their crates and relics wins.
  - Winners: Team USA
- Under Siege: Played in gender divided rounds. Both teams are placed inside of a swinging container and must solve a hexagonal puzzle. The team that completes the puzzle in the fastest time (in whichever round) wins. In the event of a tie, a sudden death round is played with some of the pieces already set in place.
  - Winners: Team USA
- Incoming: Played in gender divided rounds. Competitors must retrieve a ball from a mud pit and return to their side to advance to the next round, while the number of balls decreases each round. The last player standing wins the round for his or her team. The first team to win two rounds wins.
  - Winners: Team UK
- Temple Wall Traverse: Teams are divided in half and start on opposite sides of a climbing wall above water. Competitors must match as many tiles labelled with Roman numerals to their position on the wall, while members of the opposite team use a series of hand cranks to separate the walls to make them more difficult to climb. The team with the most tiles matched after fifteen minutes wins.
  - Winners: Team USA
- Escape To Freedom: Played in gender divided rounds. One at a time, competitors attempt to complete an obstacle course dragged by a boat and ring a bell at the end without falling in the water. At a section of the course, there is a defender from the opposing team attempting to stop them from finishing. The team with the most players to finish the course within the time limit wins.
  - Winners: Team USA
- Puzzling Swim: Teams start on a platform in the water and swim in pairs to retrieve a total of four keys that unlock a riddle and letter tiles. The first team to identify the answer to the riddle wins. Additionally, the slowest swimming pair from either team would be eliminated.
  - Winners: Team USA
  - Eliminated: Joss & Kayleigh
- Mine The Cart: One male and one female from each team are suspended in a cart above the water. They must wheel the cart to collect as many medallions as possible, while a member from the opposing team swims and collect a saw to cut through the ropes connected to their cart. Once the rope is cut, players inside the cart will be tipped out and cannot collect medallions anymore. The team with the most medallions after three rounds wins.
  - Winners: Team UK

=== Proving Ground games ===
- Pole Wrestle: Players are placed at the center of a circle and are asked to place both hands on a pole. The first contestant to wrestle the pole out of his opponent's hands two out of three times wins.
  - Played by: Idris vs. Sean
- Firestarter: Players push a cart full of rocks with a lit torch toward their opponent's fuse. Whoever lights their opponent's fuse first wins.
  - Played by: Big T vs. Georgia
- Firing Squad: A ball is shot from a cannon and the players have to wrestle the ball from each other and deposit it into their basket for a point. The first player to get to two points wins.
  - Played by: Bear vs. Wes
- Branched Out: Players must climb a tree by placing 21 branch-like pegs in slots. The first player to correctly place all the pegs and ring the bell at the top wins.
  - Played by: Laurel vs. Ninja
- Die For Me: Players are locked in a cube-shaped cage with a bag of numbered balls. They must then roll the cage down a path with seven landmines with Roman numerals on them, placing the numbered balls corresponding to the landmines. The first player to correctly place all the balls in the landmines and detonate the eight landmine at the end of the pathway wins.
  - Played by: Bananas vs. Theo
- Trapped: Players start at the top of a platform and must slide down a glass tower into a ball pit where a puzzle key is hidden. Players must memorize the puzzle key, shimmy back up the glass tower and put their puzzle together. The first player to complete the puzzle wins.
  - Played by: Jenny vs. Nicole
- Whalloped: Players stand at opposite ends of six walls. When the horn sounds, players run around the walls until they meet in the middle where they have to get through or around their opponent to the other side and ring the bell. The first player to ring the bell first three times wins.
  - Played by: Bear vs. Joss
- Running Riot: Players are given two answer keys and must retrieve 25 relics with their weight corresponding to the numbers. The player who retrieves all 25 relics and places them in the exact order wins.
  - Played by: Esther vs. Georgia, Kyle vs. Theo
- Break Free: Players must use a rope to swing and break through a dry wall to reach a three-dimensional puzzle. The first player to solve their puzzle wins.
  - Played by: Idris vs. Theo
- Blockbuster: Players push blocks to their opponents side of a structure while trying not to fall off. The contestant who pushes the most blocks within the time limit two out of three times wins.
  - Played by: Georgia vs. Tori
- Under the Hammer: Players use sledgehammers to hit 12 nails through concrete and smash the lightbulbs underneath. The first player to break all 12 lightbulbs wins.
  - Played by: Jordan vs. Theo
- Hall Brawl: Players must run through a narrow hallway past another contestant to ring a bell. The player who rings the bell first twice, wins the elimination.
  - Played by: Jenny vs. Tori
- End of the Rope: Players begin standing on a small platform and pull on a rope that is buried underground. The first player to retrieve all of the rope or pull their opponent off the platform three times wins.
  - Played by: Jordan vs. Josh
- Run for Your Life: Players are given a box with four puzzle pieces inside. They must carry two puzzle pieces at a time and run up a mountain to a structure where their puzzle station is. After they collect all four pieces, the first person to complete their puzzle wins.
  - Played by: Ashley vs. Nany

=== Final Challenge ===
Day one

First Stage: Each team begins with a gurney equipped with a relic and twenty pounds of sandbags for each member of the team. Each team must complete a sixteen-mile race while carrying the gurney (with the weight on top), undergoing checkpoints every four miles along the course. Only four members of each team can carry the gurney at once however players may switch out at checkpoints. Once each checkpoint is complete, teams run to their respective boat to be transported to the overnight stage of the final. The first team to finish receives a five-minute headstart for the final leg.

- Checkpoint 1 (Leverage Up): Using a catapult, each team must fire three coconuts into a basket.
- Checkpoint 2 (Number Crunch): Each competitor must correctly answer a math question using numbers from a number board.
- Checkpoint 3 (Basket Ballin'): Each competitor has three attempts to land a ball into a basket. Players who fail to land the ball in the basket must consume a bowl consisting of skewered scorpion with insects, as well as consume a live grub worm from a shot glass.
- Checkpoint 4 (Pyramid Scheme): Each team must complete a triangular puzzle before moving on to the finish line of the first leg. Teams are also free to move on should they time-out after reaching a maximum time limit.

Note: Both teams incurred a ten-minute penalty during the first leg; Team UK for CT knocking the Team USA gurney and causing carriers to stumble off the track, and Team USA for carrying the weight by hand and switching out carriers between checkpoints.

Overnight Stage: After swimming to shore from their team boat, each team is provided with one bed located inside a snake pit. One member from each team may sleep on the bed at a time, while other members of the team must stand on a set of stairs outside of the snake pit.

Day two

Mid-Final Purge: Each player competed in a mid-final purge the following morning. Each player individually race to complete a puzzle, run down to the beach and swim to their respective team boat. The first four players from each team to reach their team boat (regardless of gender) advance to the final leg while the remaining players are eliminated.

- Eliminated: Ashley, Kam, Leroy (Team USA)
- Eliminated: Tori (Team UK)

Second Stage (Chain Gang): Each team is attached by a chain around their ankles. They must then complete a six-mile run while chained before completing a puzzle (or timing out the designated time limit). Teams must then kayak to a yacht offshore, the first team to have all four members reach the yacht is declared the winning team of War of the Worlds 2.

- Winners: Team UK (CT, Dee, Jordan, Rogan) — $1,000,000 ($250,000 each)
- Runners-up: Team USA (Cara Maria, Ninja, Paulie, Zach)

== Game summary ==
Episode		Gender	Winners		Proving Ground Contestants		Proving Ground game	Proving Ground outcome		
#	Challenge	Gender	Team	Tribunal	Losers' Pick	Tribunal Pick	Proving Ground game	Winner	Eliminated	Turncoat
1	Trench Warfare (Note: The Reinforcements (CT, Dee, Ninja and Turbo) did not compete in the first challenge. The winning team of the challenge had the opportunity to choose one guy and one girl from the reinforcements to compete on their team. Team USA chose Ninja and Turbo. Dee and CT joined Team UK.)	Male	Team USA	**Jordan**, Laurel, Wes	Sean	Idris	Pole Wrestle	Idris	Sean	No
2	Cryptic Crossbow	Female	Team USA	Ashley, **Kam**, Paulie	Big T	Georgia	Firestarter	Georgia	Big T	No
3	Paddlewheel Puzzle	Male	Team USA	**Josh**, Laurel, Zach	Bear	Wes	Firing Squad	Bear	Wes	No
4	Relic Runner	Female	Team UK	**Dee**, Georgia, Idris	Ninja	Laurel	Branched Out	Ninja	Laurel	No
5	Hooked	Male	Team USA	Cara Maria, Jordan, **Paulie**	Theo	Bananas	Die For Me	Theo	Bananas	No
6	Explosive Decisions (Note: Only six players per team participated in the "Explosive Decisions" challenge. Bear, Dee, Georgia, Nicole, Rogan and Theo represented team UK, while Ashley, Kam, Jordan, Paulie, Tori and Zach represented team USA.)	Female	Team USA	Leroy, **Nany**, Ninja	Nicole	Jenny	Trapped	Jenny	Nicole	No
7	Resilient River Run	Male	Team USA	Tori, Turbo, **Zach**	Bear	Joss	Whalloped	Joss	Bear	No
8	Crate Expectations	Female	Team USA	**Ashley**, Cara Maria, Paulie	Esther	Georgia	Running Riot	Georgia	Esther	No
8	Crate Expectations	Male	Team USA	**Ashley**, Cara Maria, Paulie	Kyle	Theo	Running Riot	Theo	Kyle	No
9	Under Siege	Male	Team USA	**Josh**, Leroy, Ninja	Idris	Theo	Break Free	Theo	Idris	No
10	Incoming (Note: Since Team USA had three more players than Team UK, Ashley, Nany and Paulie were randomly chosen and did not participate in the "Incoming" challenge.)	Female	Team UK	Jenny, Joss, **Kayleigh**	Tori	Georgia	Blockbuster	Tori	Georgia	Yes
11	Temple Wall Traverse	Male	Team USA	Cara Maria, **Paulie**, Zach	Theo	Jordan	Under the Hammer	Jordan	Theo	Yes
12	Escape To Freedom (Note: Since Team USA had one more female player than Team UK, Nany was randomly chosen and did not participate in the "Escape to Freedom" challenge.)	Female	Team USA	Leroy, **Kam**, Nany	Tori	Jenny	Hall Brawl	Tori	Jenny	—N/a
13	Puzzling Swim (Note: Due to uneven numbers, Ninja was selected by Team USA and did not participate in the swimming portion of the "Puzzling Swim" challenge. Team UK also had uneven numbers; therefore CT participated in the swimming portion alone. This also meant both competitors were ineligible to be purged.)	—N/a	Team USA	—N/a					Joss & Kayleigh	—N/a
13	Puzzling Swim	Male	Team USA	Ashley, **Ninja**, Zach	Jordan	Josh	End of the Rope	Jordan	Josh	—N/a
14	Mine the Cart (Note: Every player had to compete in the "Mine the Cart" challenge. Since Team USA had more female players, they had to select two female members (Ashley and Cara Maria) to complete the swimming portion of the challenge, while Team UK had more male players and selected Jordan.)	Female	Team UK	**CT**, Rogan, Tori	Nany	Ashley	Run For Your Life	Ashley	Nany	No
15/16	Final Challenge (Note: The second stage of the Final Challenge only allowed four members of each team to progress. Therefore one member from Team UK (Tori) and three members from Team USA (Ashley, Kam & Leroy) were purged.)	—N/a	—N/a						Ashley	—N/a
15/16	Final Challenge	—N/a	—N/a						Kam	—N/a
15/16	Final Challenge	—N/a	—N/a						Leroy	—N/a
15/16	Final Challenge	—N/a	—N/a						Tori	—N/a
15/16	Final Challenge	—N/a	**Team UK**							

Bold indicates the speaker of the team.

=== Elimination progress ===
Contestants	Episodes														
Contestants	1	2	3	4	5	6	7	8	9	10	11	12	13	14	Finale
CT	SAFE	SAFE	SAFE	SAFE	SAFE	SAFE	SAFE	SAFE	SAFE	SAFE	SAFE	SAFE	SAFE	**WIN**	WINNER
Dee	SAFE	SAFE	SAFE	**WIN**	SAFE	SAFE	SAFE	SAFE	SAFE	SAFE	SAFE	SAFE	SAFE	SAFE	WINNER
Jordan	**WIN**	SAFE	SAFE	SAFE	WIN	SAFE	SAFE	SAFE	SAFE	SAFE	ELIM	SAFE	ELIM	SAFE	WINNER
Rogan	SAFE	SAFE	SAFE	SAFE	SAFE	SAFE	SAFE	SAFE	SAFE	SAFE	SAFE	SAFE	SAFE	WIN	WINNER
Cara Maria	SAFE	SAFE	SAFE	SAFE	WIN	SAFE	SAFE	WIN	SAFE	SAFE	WIN	SAFE	SAFE	SAFE	LOSER
Ninja	SAFE	SAFE	SAFE	ELIM	SAFE	WIN	SAFE	SAFE	WIN	SAFE	SAFE	SAFE	**WIN**	SAFE	LOSER
Paulie	SAFE	WIN	SAFE	SAFE	**WIN**	SAFE	SAFE	WIN	SAFE	SAFE	**WIN**	SAFE	SAFE	SAFE	LOSER
Zach	SAFE	SAFE	WIN	SAFE	SAFE	SAFE	**WIN**	SAFE	SAFE	SAFE	WIN	SAFE	WIN	SAFE	LOSER
Ashley	SAFE	WIN	SAFE	SAFE	SAFE	SAFE	SAFE	**WIN**	SAFE	SAFE	SAFE	SAFE	WIN	ELIM	PURGED
Kam	SAFE	**WIN**	SAFE	SAFE	SAFE	SAFE	SAFE	SAFE	SAFE	SAFE	SAFE	**WIN**	SAFE	SAFE	PURGED
Leroy	SAFE	SAFE	SAFE	SAFE	SAFE	WIN	SAFE	SAFE	WIN	SAFE	SAFE	WIN	SAFE	SAFE	PURGED
Tori	SAFE	SAFE	SAFE	SAFE	SAFE	SAFE	WIN	SAFE	SAFE	ELIM	SAFE	ELIM	SAFE	WIN	PURGED
Nany	SAFE	SAFE	SAFE	SAFE	SAFE	**WIN**	SAFE	SAFE	SAFE	SAFE	SAFE	WIN	SAFE	OUT	
Josh	SAFE	SAFE	**WIN**	SAFE	SAFE	SAFE	SAFE	SAFE	**WIN**	SAFE	SAFE	SAFE	OUT		
Joss	SAFE	SAFE	SAFE	SAFE	SAFE	SAFE	ELIM	SAFE	SAFE	WIN	SAFE	SAFE	LAST		
Kayleigh	SAFE	SAFE	SAFE	SAFE	SAFE	SAFE	SAFE	SAFE	SAFE	**WIN**	SAFE	SAFE	LAST		
Jenny	SAFE	SAFE	SAFE	SAFE	SAFE	ELIM	SAFE	SAFE	SAFE	WIN	SAFE	OUT			
Theo	SAFE	SAFE	SAFE	SAFE	ELIM	SAFE	SAFE	ELIM	ELIM	SAFE	OUT				
Georgia	SAFE	ELIM	SAFE	WIN	SAFE	SAFE	SAFE	ELIM	SAFE	OUT					
Turbo	SAFE	SAFE	SAFE	SAFE	SAFE	SAFE	WIN	SAFE	SAFE	DQ					
Idris	ELIM	SAFE	SAFE	WIN	SAFE	SAFE	SAFE	SAFE	OUT						
Kyle	SAFE	SAFE	SAFE	SAFE	SAFE	SAFE	SAFE	OUT							
Esther	SAFE	SAFE	SAFE	SAFE	SAFE	SAFE	SAFE	OUT							
Bear	SAFE	SAFE	ELIM	SAFE	SAFE	SAFE	OUT								
Nicole	SAFE	SAFE	SAFE	SAFE	SAFE	OUT									
Bananas	SAFE	SAFE	SAFE	SAFE	OUT										
Laurel	WIN	SAFE	WIN	OUT											
Wes	WIN	SAFE	OUT												
Big T	SAFE	OUT													
Faith	SAFE	QUIT													
Zahida	SAFE	QUIT													
Sean	OUT														

Competition key
The contestant's team won the Final Challenge
The contestant's team lost the Final Challenge
The contestant was eliminated during the Final Challenge
The contestant's team won the daily challenge, was in the Tribunal, and was safe from elimination. Bold indicates the speaker of the team.
The contestant was not chosen to go into the Proving Ground
The contestant was put into the Proving Ground and won
The contestant was put into the Proving Ground and was eliminated
The contestant was eliminated for finishing last in the daily challenge
The contestant was disqualified from the competition due to disciplinary reasons
The contestant withdrew from the competition

== Voting history ==
Bold indicates the Tribunal.

Losing team's Nomination	**Sean**; 14 of 16 votes	**Big T** 13 of 14 votes	**Bear**; 8 of 13 votes	**Ninja**; 8 of 14 votes	**Theo**; 7 of 13 votes	**Nicole**; 7 of 13 votes	**Bear**; 6 of 12 votes	**Esther** volunteered	**Kyle**; 7 of 11 votes	**Idris**; 7 of 9 votes	**Tori**; 6 of 11 votes	**Theo**; 4 of 8 votes	**Tori**; 5 of 8 votes	**Jordan**; 3 of 5 votes	**Nany**; 5 of 8 votes
Tribunal's Nomination	**Idris**; 2 of 3 votes	**Georgia**; 3 of 3 votes	**Wes**; 2 of 3 votes	**Laurel**; 2 of 3 votes	**Bananas**; 2 of 3 votes	**Jenny**; 2 of 3 votes	**Joss**; 3 of 3 votes	**Georgia**; 3 of 3 votes	**Theo**; 3 of 3 votes	**Theo**; 2 of 3 votes	**Georgia**; 2 of 3 votes	**Jordan**; 2 of 3 votes	**Jenny**; 2 of 3 votes	**Josh**; 2 of 3 votes	**Ashley**; 2 of 3 votes
Voter	Episode														
Voter	1	2	3	4	5	6	7	8		9	10	11	12	13	14
CT	Sean	Big T	Bear		Theo	Nicole	Bear	—N/a	Kyle	Idris		Theo	Tori	Jordan	**Ninja**
Dee	Sean	Big T	Bear	**Laurel**	Theo	Nicole	Bear	—N/a	Kyle	Idris		Theo	Tori	Jordan	
Jordan	**Idris**			Ninja	**Rogan**						Ninja		—N/a	—N/a	
Rogan	Sean	Big T	Bear		Theo	Nicole	Bear	—N/a	Kyle	Idris		Theo	Tori	Jordan	**Ashley**
Cara Maria				Laurel	**Bananas**			**Georgia**	**Theo**		Tori	**Jordan**			Nany
Ninja				Laurel		**Jenny**				**Theo**	Tori			**Josh**	Nany
Paulie		**Georgia**		Laurel	**Bananas**			**Georgia**	**Theo**		Tori	**Jordan**			Nany
Zach			**Theo**	Ninja			**Joss**				Ninja	**Joss**		**Paulie**	Ninja
Ashley		**Georgia**		Ninja				**Georgia**	**Theo**		Tori			**Josh**	Nany
Kam		**Georgia**		Laurel							Tori		**Jenny**		Nany
Leroy				Ninja		**Jenny**				**Theo**	Tori		**Jenny**		Ninja
Tori				Ninja			**Joss**				Ninja	—N/a	—N/a	—N/a	**Ashley**
Nany				Ninja		**Esther**					Ninja		**Kayleigh**		Ninja
Josh			**Wes**	Ashley						**Joss**	Ninja				
Joss	Sean	Big T	Bear		Theo	Nicole	Bear	—N/a	Kyle	Idris	**Georgia**	Joss	Tori		
Kayleigh	Sean	Esther	Bear		Theo	Nicole	Bear	—N/a	Kyle	—N/a	**Georgia**	Theo	Tori		
Jenny	Sean	Big T	—N/a		—N/a	Esther	Rogan	—N/a	Idris	Idris	**Ashley**	—N/a	—N/a		
Theo	Sean	Big T	Rogan		Rogan	Esther	Rogan	—N/a	Idris	Idris		—N/a			
Georgia	Sean	Big T	Idris	**Cara Maria**	—N/a	Esther	Rogan	—N/a	Idris	Idris					
Turbo				Ashley			**Joss**								
Idris	Sean	Big T	Bear	**Laurel**	Theo	Nicole	Bear	—N/a	Kyle	—N/a					
Kyle	Sean	Big T	Bear		—N/a	Esther	Rogan	—N/a	Idris						
Esther	Sean	Big T	Bear		Theo	Nicole	Kyle	Esther	Kyle						
Bear	Sean	Big T	Idris		—N/a	Esther	Rogan								
Nicole	Sean	Big T	Idris		—N/a	Esther									
Bananas				Ninja											
Laurel	**Idris**		**Wes**	Ninja											
Wes	**Bear**														
Big T	Bear	Big T													
Faith															
Zahida	Sean														
Sean	—N/a														

== Teams ==
Teams at the start of each episode.

Contestants	Episodes														
Contestants	1	2	3	4	5	6	7	8	9	10	11	12	13	14	Finale
CT	RNF	UK													
Dee	RNF	UK													
Jordan	USA											UK			
Rogan	UK														
Cara Maria	USA														
Ninja	RNF	USA													
Paulie	USA														
Zach	USA														
Ashley	USA														
Kam	USA														
Leroy	USA														
Tori	USA										UK				
Nany	USA														
Josh	USA														
Joss	UK														
Kayleigh	UK														
Jenny	UK														
Theo	UK														
Georgia	UK														
Turbo	RNF	USA													
Idris	UK														
Kyle	UK														
Esther	UK														
Bear	UK														
Nicole	UK														
Bananas	USA														
Laurel	USA														
Wes	USA														
Big T	UK														
Faith	USA														
Zahida	UK														
Sean	UK														

Key
USA Team USA
UK Team UK
RNF Reinforcement

Intra-team pairs

Puzzling Swim (Ep. 13)
Team UK	Team USA
CT	Ashley & Zach
Dee & Rogan	Cara Maria & Paulie
Jordan & Tori	Josh & Nany
Joss & Kayleigh	Leroy & Kam

Mine the Cart (Ep. 14)
Team UK	Team USA
Rogan & Tori	Kam & Paulie
CT & Dee	Leroy & Nany
Rogan & Tori	Ninja & Zach

== Episodes ==
No. overall	No. in season	Title	Original release date	US viewers (millions)
438	1	"The British Are Coming!"	August 28, 2019	0.89
439	2	"God Save the Queen"	September 4, 2019	0.69
440	3	"United We Stand, Divided We Fall"	September 11, 2019	0.75
441	4	"Benedict Laurel"	September 18, 2019	0.72
442	5	"In Paulie We Trust"	September 25, 2019	0.60
443	6	"One Nation Under Leroy"	October 2, 2019	0.84
444	7	"Zero Dark Turbo"	October 9, 2019	0.79
445	8	"Saving Private Esther"	October 16, 2019	0.65
446	9	"The Royal Rumble"	October 23, 2019	0.73
447	10	"Infinity War"	October 30, 2019	0.65
448	11	"All Is Fair In Love And War"	November 6, 2019	0.67
449	12	"The Right Honorable Rogan"	November 13, 2019	0.57
450	13	"Dee-Day"	November 20, 2019	0.70
451	14	"Declaration of Independence"	November 27, 2019	0.80
452	15	"A Tale of Two Countries"	December 4, 2019	0.82
453	16	"Give Me Liberty or Give Me Cash"	December 11, 2019	0.83

=== Reunion special ===
The two part reunion special aired on December 18, 2019 and was hosted by Justina Valentine and NBA Champion Nick Young. Cast members attended in London, England. The first part received 0.64 million viewers along with a 0.4 18–49 demo rating, while the second part dropped to 0.54 million and a 0.3 demo rating.
