= The Challenge: War of the Worlds =

33rd season of the reality television series

War of the Worlds
- Season 33
- Presented by: T. J. Lavin
- No. of contestants: 34
- Winner: Turabi "Turbo" Çamkıran
- Location: Swakopmund, Namibia
- No. of episodes: 18 (including the two-part Reunion special)

Release
- Original network: MTV
- Original release: February 6 – May 29, 2019

Season chronology
- ← Previous; Final Reckoning Next → War of the Worlds 2

The Challenge: War of the Worlds is the 33rd season of the MTV reality competition series The Challenge. This season featured alumni from The Real World, The Challenge, Are You the One?, The Bachelor Canada, The Bachelorette, Big Brother, Celebrity Big Brother UK, Love Island UK, Survivor Türkiye, American Ninja Warrior, Party Down South, Geordie Shore, Ex on the Beach (Brazil, U.S., and UK), Telemundo, and Floribama Shore competing for a share of a $1 million prize. The season had a "Basic Training" launch special on January 30, 2019, and premiered on February 6, 2019 on MTV.

This is the first edition of the War of the Worlds series, with War of the Worlds 2 following in the fall of 2019.

== Format ==
This season featured 16 Challenge veterans and 18 prospects - debuting Challenge competitors from around the world. For the first ten episodes, the players competed in male/female pairs. Each veteran player paired with a prospect of the opposite sex. The Prospect picked their alumni partner based on the finish order of the opening "Impending Dune" challenge. Once in their pairs, the main phase of the game began. The main elements of the game are as follows:

- Daily Missions: Each round the pairs compete in the daily challenge. The top 3 pairs are immune from elimination and form the Tribunal for that round of play.
- Tribunal: The Tribunal collectively nominate three pairs to nominate for the elimination round. The nominated pairs then face the Tribunal's interrogation with each nominee having the chance to plea their case as to why they should not be voted-in to the elimination.
- Eliminations (The Killing Floor): At "The Killing Floor", the members of the tribunal each individually and publicly vote for a nominated pair to enter the elimination round. The nominated team must then call-out any non-immune pair, challenging them to the elimination. The losing pair is eliminated from the game, while the winner stays in the game and is given "The Relic" - which awards them immunity in the next round of play.

During the 10th episode of the season, the 7 remaining pairs were disbanded, with the 14 remaining players playing the rest of the competition as individuals - with players competing in challenges as individuals and eliminated as individuals. The game format remains mostly the same, but with each round of play being designated as a male or female round and only players of the designated gender are at risk of being eliminated, but any player can be part of that round's Tribunal. Additionally, the relic is no longer awarded to an individual elimination winner.

When eight players remain, they compete individually in the Final Challenge for their share of the $1,000,000 prize. First place received $750,000; second place received $200,000; third place received the remaining $50,000.

Twists

- Purge: Some challenges are designated as a Purge challenge - sudden death challenges the losers are immediately eliminated. Two Purge challenge were held during the game:
  - In the "Impending Dune" challenge, the worst finishing male and female prospect were eliminated before pairs were drafted.
  - In the "Judgement Day" challenge, the worst finishing male and female were eliminated in the Penultimate Challenge of the game.
- Double Elimination: The "Ring Tossed" challenge was a Double Elimination in which three teams competed and four players were eliminated (opposed to the normal two players). The pair called-out by the nominated pair must also call-out a third pair - meaning 3 teams would compete to stay in the game. Then the three players of each gender compete against each other in the elimination and only the winner of each gendered heat remaining in the game. Should members of two different pairs win their gendered-heat, they form a new pair and continue in the game, while their original partner is eliminated.

== Contestants ==
Male contestants	Original season	Finish
Turabi "Turbo" Çamkıran	Survivor Turkey 8	Winner
Theo Campbell	Love Island UK 3	Runner-up
Wes Bergmann	The Real World: Austin	Third place
Hunter Barfield	Are You the One? 3	Sixth place (Note: After the first leg of the final challenge, a tribunal was held between the Top 3 players (Theo, Wes, Turbo) of Part 1 of the final challenge, with the remaining players (Natalie D., Cara Maria, Hunter) being Nominated. The Tribunal voted for Hunter to go into a special elimination, who Called-Out Natalie D. as his opponent. Hunter was eliminated and placed 6th)
Paulie Calafiore	Big Brother 18	Episode 14
Kyle Christie	Geordie Shore 8	Episode 13
Stephen Bear	Celebrity Big Brother UK 18	Episode 10
Ashley Cain	Ex on the Beach UK 1	Episode 9
Gus Smyrnios	Floribama Shore	Episode 8
Josh Martinez (Note: Before the draft took place, Alan was removed from the competition due to a broken hand that he suffered at the first challenge. Josh was initially eliminated after finishing in last place at the first challenge; however, he was subsequently brought back to the competition to be partnered with Amanda, who was temporarily left without a partner at the draft.)	Big Brother 19	Episode 7
Leroy Garrett	The Real World: Las Vegas (2011)	Episode 6
Zach Nichols	The Real World: San Diego (2011)	Episode 5
Chris "CT" Tamburello	The Real World: Paris	Episode 4
João Paulo "JP" Andrade	Ex on the Beach Brazil 2	Episode 4
Johnny "Bananas" Devenanzio	The Real World: Key West	Episode 3
Chase McNary	The Bachelorette 12	Episode 2
Alan Valdez	Tierra de Reyes	Episode 1

Female contestants	Original season	Finish
Natalie Duran	American Ninja Warrior 8	Fourth place
Cara Maria Sorbello	The Challenge: Fresh Meat II	Fifth place
Mattie Lynn Breaux	Party Down South	Seventh place (Note: Georgia was disqualified from Part 1 of the final challenge after suffering dehydration. She placed 8th. Mattie quit the game midway into Part 1 of the final challenge. She placed 7th.)
Georgia Harrison	Love Island UK 3	Eighth place
Da'Vonne Rogers	Big Brother 17	Episode 14
Dee Nguyen	Geordie Shore 17	Episode 14
Nany Gonzalez	The Real World: Las Vegas (2011)	Episode 12
Kam Williams	Are You the One? 5	Episode 9
Jenna Compono	Real World: Ex-Plosion	Episode 8
Amanda Garcia	Are You the One? 3	Episode 7
Shaleen Sutherland	The Bachelor Canada 3	Episode 6
Zahida Allen	Ex on the Beach UK 6	Episode 5
Julia Nolan	Big Brother 17	Episode 4
Natalie Negrotti	Big Brother 18	Episode 4
Morgan Willett	Big Brother: Over the Top	Episode 3
Ashley Mitchell	Real World: Ex-Plosion	Episode 2
Liz Nolan	Big Brother 17	Episode 1

=== Draft selections ===
Pick #	Prospect	Veteran	Team
1	Natalie Duran	Paulie Calafiore	Paulie & Natalie D.
2	Ashley Cain	Kam Williams	Kam & Ashley C.
3	Morgan Willett	Johnny "Bananas" Devenanzio	Bananas & Morgan
4	Stephen Bear	Da'Vonne Rogers	Da'Vonne & Bear
5	Georgia Harrison	Hunter Barfield	Hunter & Georgia
6	Theo Campbell	Cara Maria Sorbello	Cara Maria & Theo
7	Julia Nolan	Chris "CT" Tamburello	CT & Julia
8	Turabi "Turbo" Çamkıran	Nany Gonzalez	Nany & Turbo
9	Dee Nguyen	Wes Bergmann	Wes & Dee
10	João Paulo "JP" Andrade	Natalie Negrotti	Natalie N. & JP
11	Mattie Lynn Breaux	Kyle Christie	Kyle & Mattie
12	Chase McNary	Ashley Mitchell	Ashley M. & Chase
13	Shaleen Sutherland	Leroy Garrett	Leroy & Shaleen
14	Zahida Allen	Zach Nichols	Zach & Zahida
15	Gus Smyrnios	Jenna Compono	Jenna & Gus
16	Josh Martinez	Amanda Garcia	Amanda & Josh

== Gameplay ==
=== Challenge games ===
- Impending Dune: Played in separate male/female rounds, players must race down a sand dune and retrieve a ball that has rolled down from the top of the dune. Players must then race back to the top of the dune with a ball to retrieve puzzle pieces, then race back down with their puzzle pieces to the bottom of the dune to a puzzle station. The last-place finishers of each round are eliminated from the competition.
  - Winners: Paulie & Da'Vonne
  - Eliminated: Josh & Liz
- Arms-a-geddon Tired: Played in two rounds of 5 minutes each, each team competes against another team in a tug-of-war. Each rope is 400 ft. long, after the 5 minutes is over, each competitor's length of rope is combined with their partner's which forms their team's total length. The three teams with the longest combined length of rope form the Tribunal.
  - Winners: Cara Maria & Theo, Bananas & Morgan, Amanda & Josh
- Search & Destroy: Played in 4 rounds, competitors must retrieve a hidden ball in a stone graveyard and return it to their partner. Their partner must then go through a mud pit and other competitors to reach the safe zone so that their team can move on to the next round. After each round, 3 teams are eliminated from the mission, as the number of balls hidden, decreases. The last three teams who make it through all 4 rounds form the Tribunal.
  - Winners: Paulie & Natalie D., Wes & Dee, Kam & Ashley C.
- Fallout: Played one team at a time, competitors must race to touch a floating buoy across an elevated obstacle. Each team must select one person to build momentum on a pendulous rod and one to jump. The fastest three teams to reach the buoy form the tribunal.
  - Winners: Paulie & Natalie D., Nany & Turbo, Hunter & Georgia
- Tired Out: Chained together, each team must race 200 yards across the desert to their stack of color-coded tires. They must then climb up a sand dune to an answer key of a tire pyramid they have to assemble. After they have memorized the answer key, they have to pick out a tire and race back to the starting line with that tire in order to build the pyramid. 14 tires are needed to complete the pyramid. The first three teams to complete the pyramid correctly form the Tribunal.
  - Winners: Paulie & Natalie D., Nany & Turbo, Cara Maria & Theo
- Doom Buggy: Played two people at a time, each contestant must climb across ten tires and unhook them while being dragged across the desert at 30 kilometers per hour. The three teams to unhook the most tires form the Tribunal.
  - Winners: Hunter & Georgia, Wes & Dee, Kyle & Mattie
- Eye in the Sky: Played two teams at a time, each team has one member blindfolded and another wearing a VR device that shows footage from the blindfolded teammate's perspective. The blindfolded partner must guide their partner across an elevated platform. The three teams with the fastest time form the Tribunal.
  - Winners: Wes & Dee, Jenna & Gus, Da'Vonne & Bear
- Brain Freeze: Each team member alternates running 100 yards into the freezing ocean water to retrieve a puzzle piece, and bringing it back to their puzzle station. They are a total of eight puzzle pieces that need to be retrieved. Once they have retrieved all eight pieces, the teams can then begin to solve their puzzle tower. The first three teams to solve their puzzle tower correctly form the Tribunal.
  - Winners: Wes & Dee, Nany & Turbo, Cara Maria & Theo
- Road Warrior: Played one team at a time, competitors must swing back and forth on top of two semi-trucks moving at 50 mph transferring rings over to their partner. There are sixteen rings total and the three teams who transfer the most rings the fastest form the Tribunal.
  - Winners: Hunter & Georgia, Kyle & Mattie, Cara Maria & Theo
- Fandemonium: There is a giant 150-foot hallway that has balls at one end of it while 3 giant hurricane fans blast wind at the players. The three fastest players that deposit their balls in 5 minutes form the Tribunal.
  - Winners: Paulie, Theo and Turbo
- Highway to Hell: Players are placed on the roof of a car that is on a track, drifting. On top of the car is a puzzle. The 3 fastest players who finish the puzzle within a 3-minute time limit form the Tribunal.
  - Winners: Mattie, Wes and Dee
- Day of Wreckoning: In teams of two, each duo run to the nearby junkyard to collect trash and run back to their dumpster to deposit it. The three teams who transfer the heaviest junk in one hour form the Tribunal.
  - Winners: Paulie & Georgia, Turbo & Natalie D., and Da'Vonne & Wes
- Crash Landing: Players are placed on a rotating airplane and attempt to solve a puzzle the fastest. Once they are done, they jump off the plane and into the water. The first male and female to do so earn their spot in the final and the first three players form the Tribunal.
  - Winners: Turbo (also immune to Final), Cara Maria (also Immune to Final) and Paulie
- Judgement Day: Players must start on one of three containers. Once the challenge starts, players must run and jump off the first container into the water and swim around a buoy and then climbing up the second container. Once on the second container, players must rope swing to the third container. On the third container, which is at a severe angle, players must grab a ring and slide down the container, back into the water and swim back to the second. They must climb up the second container and place a ring around a pole. The last placing guy and girl are eliminated.
  - Eliminated: Paulie & Da'Vonne

=== Killing Floor games ===
- Drone Ball Drop: Played in female and male rounds, a drone will drop a ball into a ring and players would run to get the ball and take it across to their basket to score a point. The first team to score two points wins.
  - Played by: Hunter & Georgia vs. Ashley M. & Chase
- Map It Out: Played for 15 minutes, each team is given the flags of twenty countries. As one competitor hands the flags to their partner, their partner must climb a rock climbing wall that is a map of the world and place the flag on the correct country. After 15 minutes, the team with the most correctly placed flags wins.
  - Played by: Bananas & Morgan vs. Zach & Zahida
- Ring Tossed: Played individually, each competitor must wrestle two of three rings from the other two competitors in their round. The first guy and girl win and form a team together.
  - Played by: Mattie vs. Natalie N. vs. Julia & Kyle vs. JP vs. CT
- Lights Out: Both teams run into a black box to assemble a puzzle. At random intervals, the lights in the boxes get shut, forcing one player to run back and switch the lights on again so that the teams can continue assembling the puzzle. The first team to assemble the puzzle and ring the bell wins.
  - Played by: Zach & Zahida vs. Wes & Dee
- Sandbag Burn: Teams have to transfer 40 heavy sandbags each across to their teammate by dragging a sled. The amount of weight per sled is up to the players. The first team to successfully transfer all the sandbags to their teammate wins.
  - Played by: Da'Vonne & Bear vs. Leroy & Shaleen
- Uphill Battle: Both teams must use a rung to climb a large ramp. As they get higher, the ramp gets wider, making it difficult to climb up without the support of their teammate. If one team falls first, the second team only has to cross the highest point the first team cleared. The first team to reach the top or to the other team's highest point wins.
  - Played by: Amanda & Josh vs. Kam & Ashley C.
- Push & Pole: Players begin at the center of a circle and are asked to place both hands on an iron pole. The first contestant to wrestle the pole out of their opponent's hands earns a point for their team. Played in gendered rounds, the first team to win three points wins.
  - Played by: Da'Vonne & Bear vs. Jenna & Gus
- Wheel of Death: One team member is strapped to a spinning wheel giving directions to their partner, who is blindfolded, on a puzzle board. The goal is to properly place the matching symbols of a puzzle key onto the board in the correct order. If one of the symbols is not right-side up, it does not count. The first team to match all the symbols correctly wins.
  - Played by: Paulie & Natalie D. vs. Kam & Ashley C.
- King of the World: Players get asked a series of question. There are five balls with the possible answers hanging above the Killing Floor with only one ball having the correct answer. When the balls drop, players must find the correct answer to the question and deposit it into their goal. The first contestant to win three points wins.
  - Played by: Kyle vs. Bear
- Chair'd Remains: Players call out another contestant to tie up their opponent onto a chair, by using duct tape. On go, the tied up players attempt to break free and ring the bell behind them. The first person to ring the bell wins.
  - Played by: Georgia vs. Nany
- Hall Brawl: Players must run through a narrow hallway past another contestant to ring a bell. The player who rings the bell first in the best two out of three rounds wins the elimination.
  - Played by: Kyle vs. Theo
- Tug O' War: Players are connected to a long rope that their opponent pulls through a wall. Once the slack in the rope goes, players are able to pull off their opponents from their platform. The first player to knock off their opponent wins.
  - Played by: Dee vs. Da'Vonne

=== Final Challenge ===
The final challenge, The Death Path, was competed by the remaining eight players individually. The path was over 50 miles long. Each player's individual times were recorded and added up to determine the winner of the season at the end of the final. During the final, competitors were eliminated until four remaining competitors crossed the finish line where the results were announced.

Day one

First Leg: Players begin the final by running and cycling through a six-mile loop four times (24 miles overall). In the middle of the figure-eight loop there are five checkpoints each player must complete. Players can complete checkpoints at any stage during the 24 miles. If the checkpoint they wish to complete is currently occupied, they may wait, or continue with their 24 miles. Each checkpoint has a 20-minute time limit before players time out. Unbeknownst to the players, the Top 3 players of this stage would form the Tribunal for an Instant Elimination.

Checkpoints

- On Point: Players stand behind a line and throw one ring onto each hook pointing out from a board.
- Pyramid Scheme: Players must complete a 5x5 grid puzzle so that each row and column has one of each color.
- Rampage: Players push a ball to the top of a ramp and into a basket using a provided pole.
- Skulled Out: Players must complete a vertical puzzle to form a picture of a skull.
- So Rolled: Players must roll a tire through a hole from behind a line.

- Tribunal: Theo, Turbo & Wes
- Eliminated: Georgia (8th place — DQ), Mattie (7th place — quit)

Instant Elimination - Walk Tiny: Players hold on to a 50-foot rope that is connected to a monster truck. The truck slowly drives thus taking the players on a walk. The first person to fall or drop the rope is eliminated.

- Played by: Hunter vs. Natalie D.
  - Winner: Natalie D.
  - Eliminated: Hunter (6th place)

Day two

Geography Trivia: Players are asked a series of multiple-choice geography trivia questions. If they answer a question incorrectly, they would be eliminated from the checkpoint. The last player standing would be driven for the first mile of the Second Leg in a dune buggy while the remaining four players must traverse the sand dunes on foot.

- Winner: Cara Maria

Second leg: Players had to travel on foot over a series of sand dunes, completing the checkpoints that the players encounter.

- Battle Ball: Players must wait for the next player to arrive. The two players place colored balls one at a time into a slot attempting to line four balls in a row (similar to Connect Four). The first player to line up four of their colored balls in a row is allowed to continue while the loser must wait for the next player to arrive to play again. The player who loses the final battle will receive a five minute time penalty, which must be served before continuing.
- Eating: The first player to arrive at the checkpoint may eat as much or as little of the provided food items as they like. Once finished, they must divide up the remaining plates of food among the remaining four players. Once the remaining players reach the checkpoint, they must eat everything they have been assigned before continuing.

Final leg: Players run five miles down a beach to reach four kayaks. Along the way, there is a math problem they must solve to unlock a kayak and paddle towards a boat wreck. As there are only four kayaks, the remaining player without a kayak is eliminated. From the boat wreck, the remaining four players run down the beach to a lighthouse where the finish line is set up. Once the final four players have reached the finish line, their total times are added to determine the winner of War of the Worlds.

- Eliminated: Cara Maria (5th place)

Final results

- Winner: Turbo ($750,000)
- Runner-up: Theo ($200,000)
- Third place: Wes ($50,000)
- Fourth place: Natalie D. ($0)

== Game summary ==
Episode		Gender	Winners	—N/a							Eliminated
#	Challenge	Gender	Winners	—N/a							Eliminated
1	Impending Dune	Male	Paulie	—N/a							Josh
1	Impending Dune	Male	Ashley C.	—N/a							Josh
1	Impending Dune	Female	Da'Vonne	—N/a							Liz
1	Impending Dune	Female	Natalie D.	—N/a							Liz
#	Challenge	—N/a	—N/a	Tribunal	Tribunal Pick			Called Out	Killing Floor game	Winner(s)	Eliminated
2	Arms-a-geddon Tired	—N/a	—N/a	Amanda & Josh, Bananas & Morgan, Cara Maria & Theo	Ashley M. & Chase	Hunter & Georgia	Zach & Zahida	Ashley M. & Chase	Drone Ball Drop	Hunter & Georgia	Ashley M. & Chase
3	Search and Destroy	—N/a	—N/a	Kam & Ashley C., Paulie & Natalie D., Wes & Dee	Amanda & Josh	Bananas & Morgan	Kyle & Mattie	Zach & Zahida	Map It Out	Zach & Zahida	Bananas & Morgan
4	Fallout	—N/a	—N/a	Hunter & Georgia, Nany & Turbo, Paulie & Natalie D.	Amanda & Josh	CT & Julia	Kyle & Mattie	Natalie N. & JP	Ring Tossed	Mattie	Natalie N.
4	Fallout	—N/a	—N/a	Hunter & Georgia, Nany & Turbo, Paulie & Natalie D.	Amanda & Josh	CT & Julia	Kyle & Mattie	Natalie N. & JP	Ring Tossed	Mattie	Julia
4	Fallout	—N/a	—N/a	Hunter & Georgia, Nany & Turbo, Paulie & Natalie D.	Amanda & Josh	CT & Julia	Kyle & Mattie	CT & Julia	Ring Tossed	Kyle	CT
4	Fallout	—N/a	—N/a	Hunter & Georgia, Nany & Turbo, Paulie & Natalie D.	Amanda & Josh	CT & Julia	Kyle & Mattie	CT & Julia	Ring Tossed	Kyle	JP
5	Tired Out	—N/a	—N/a	Cara Maria & Theo, Nany & Turbo, Paulie & Natalie D.	Da'Vonne & Bear	Jenna & Gus	Zach & Zahida	Wes & Dee	Lights Out	Wes & Dee	Zach & Zahida
6	Doom Buggy	—N/a	—N/a	Hunter & Georgia, Kyle & Mattie, Wes & Dee	Amanda & Josh	Da'Vonne & Bear	Paulie & Natalie D.	Leroy & Shaleen	Sandbag Burn	Da'Vonne & Bear	Leroy & Shaleen
7	Eye in the Sky	—N/a	—N/a	Da'Vonne & Bear, Jenna & Gus, Wes & Dee	Amanda & Josh	Kam & Ashley C.	Paulie & Natalie D.	Kam & Ashley C.	Uphill Battle	Kam & Ashley C.	Amanda & Josh
8	Brain Freeze	—N/a	—N/a	Cara Maria & Theo, Nany & Turbo, Wes & Dee	Da'Vonne & Bear	Hunter & Georgia	Kyle & Mattie	Jenna & Gus	Push & Pole	Da'Vonne & Bear	Jenna & Gus
9	Road Warrior	—N/a	—N/a	Cara Maria & Theo, Hunter & Georgia, Kyle & Mattie	Paulie & Natalie D.	Nany & Turbo	Wes & Dee	Kam & Ashley C.	Wheel of Death	Paulie & Natalie D.	Kam & Ashley C.
10	Fandemonium	Male	—N/a	Paulie, Theo, Turbo	Hunter	Kyle	Wes	Bear	King of the World	Kyle	Bear
11/12	Highway to Hell	Female	—N/a	Dee, Mattie, Wes	Cara Maria	Da'Vonne	Georgia	Nany	Chair'd Remains	Georgia	Nany
12/13	Day of Wreckoning	Male	—N/a	Da'Vonne & Wes, Georgia & Paulie, Natalie D. & Turbo	Hunter	Kyle	Theo	Theo	Hall Brawl	Theo	Kyle
13/14	Crash Landing	Female	—N/a	Cara Maria, Paulie, Turbo	Da'Vonne	Dee	Natalie D.	Da'Vonne	Tug O' War	Da'Vonne	Dee
14	Judgement Day	—N/a	—N/a	—N/a							Paulie
14	Judgement Day	—N/a	—N/a	—N/a							Da'Vonne
15/16	The Death Path	—N/a	Turbo	2nd place: Theo; 3rd place: Wes; 4th place: Natalie D.; 5th place: Cara Maria; 6th place: Hunter; 7th place: Mattie; 8th place: Georgia							

=== Elimination progress ===
Contestants	Episodes														
Contestants	1	2	3	4	5	6	7	8	9	10	11/12	12/13	13/14	14	Finale
Turbo	SAFE	SAFE	SAFE	WIN	WIN	SAFE	SAFE	WIN	RISK	WIN	SAFE	WIN	ADV	—N/a	WINNER
Theo	SAFE	WIN	SAFE	SAFE	WIN	SAFE	SAFE	WIN	WIN	WIN	SAFE	ELIM	SAFE	SAFE	SECOND
Wes	SAFE	SAFE	WIN	SAFE	ELIM	WIN	WIN	WIN	RISK	RISK	WIN	WIN	SAFE	SAFE	THIRD
Natalie D.	WIN	SAFE	WIN	WIN	WIN	RISK	RISK	SAFE	ELIM	SAFE	SAFE	WIN	RISK	SAFE	FOURTH
Cara Maria	SAFE	WIN	SAFE	SAFE	WIN	SAFE	SAFE	WIN	WIN	SAFE	RISK	SAFE	ADV	—N/a	FIFTH
Hunter	SAFE	ELIM	SAFE	WIN	SAFE	WIN	SAFE	RISK	WIN	RISK	SAFE	RISK	SAFE	SAFE	SIXTH
Mattie	SAFE	SAFE	RISK	ELIM	SAFE	WIN	SAFE	RISK	WIN	SAFE	WIN	SAFE	SAFE	SAFE	SEVENTH
Georgia	SAFE	ELIM	SAFE	WIN	SAFE	WIN	SAFE	RISK	WIN	SAFE	ELIM	WIN	SAFE	SAFE	EIGHTH
Da'Vonne	WIN	SAFE	SAFE	SAFE	RISK	ELIM	WIN	ELIM	SAFE	SAFE	RISK	WIN	ELIM	LAST	
Paulie	WIN	SAFE	WIN	WIN	WIN	RISK	RISK	SAFE	ELIM	WIN	SAFE	WIN	WIN	LAST	
Dee	SAFE	SAFE	WIN	SAFE	ELIM	WIN	WIN	WIN	RISK	SAFE	WIN	SAFE	OUT		
Kyle	SAFE	SAFE	RISK	ELIM	SAFE	WIN	SAFE	RISK	WIN	ELIM	SAFE	OUT			
Nany	SAFE	SAFE	SAFE	WIN	WIN	SAFE	SAFE	WIN	RISK	SAFE	OUT				
Bear	SAFE	SAFE	SAFE	SAFE	RISK	ELIM	WIN	ELIM	SAFE	OUT					
Kam	SAFE	SAFE	WIN	SAFE	SAFE	SAFE	ELIM	SAFE	OUT						
Ashley C.	WIN	SAFE	WIN	SAFE	SAFE	SAFE	ELIM	SAFE	OUT						
Jenna	SAFE	SAFE	SAFE	SAFE	RISK	SAFE	WIN	OUT							
Gus	SAFE	SAFE	SAFE	SAFE	RISK	SAFE	WIN	OUT							
Amanda	SAFE	WIN	RISK	RISK	SAFE	RISK	OUT								
Josh	LAST	WIN	RISK	RISK	SAFE	RISK	OUT								
Leroy	SAFE	SAFE	SAFE	SAFE	SAFE	OUT									
Shaleen	SAFE	SAFE	SAFE	SAFE	SAFE	OUT									
Zach	SAFE	RISK	ELIM	SAFE	OUT										
Zahida	SAFE	RISK	ELIM	SAFE	OUT										
CT	SAFE	SAFE	SAFE	OUT											
JP	SAFE	SAFE	SAFE	OUT											
Julia	SAFE	SAFE	SAFE	OUT											
Natalie N.	SAFE	SAFE	SAFE	OUT											
Bananas	SAFE	WIN	OUT												
Morgan	SAFE	WIN	OUT												
Ashley M.	SAFE	OUT													
Chase	SAFE	OUT													
Alan	MED														
Liz	LAST														

Competition
The contestant completed the Final Challenge and won
The contestant completed the Final Challenge and lost
The contestant was eliminated during the Final Challenge
The contestant/team won the daily challenge, was in the Tribunal, and was safe from elimination
The contestant won the second-to-last challenge, automatically qualified for the Final Challenge, and was in the Tribunal
The contestant won the daily challenge, but was not in the Tribunal
The contestant was safe from elimination by the Relic
The contestant was safe from elimination by the Relic, won the challenge and was in the Tribunal
The contestant was nominated by the Tribunal for the Killing Floor, but was not selected
The contestant was not selected to go into elimination
The contestant won in the Killing Floor
The contestant lost in the Killing Floor and was eliminated
The contestant was removed from the competition due to medical reasons
The contestant withdrew from the competition
The contestant was eliminated at the challenge

== Team selections ==
Day of Wreckoning (Ep. 12)
Cara Maria & Theo
Da'Vonne & Wes
Dee & Kyle
Georgia & Paulie
Hunter & Mattie
Natalie D. & Turbo

== Voting history ==
Tribunal's Vote	Hunter & Georgia; 3 of 6 votes	Bananas & Morgan; 3 of 6 votes	Kyle & Mattie; 3 of 6 votes	Zach & Zahida; 3 of 6 votes	Da'Vonne & Bear; 3 of 6 votes	Amanda & Josh; 4 of 6 votes	Da'Vonne & Bear; 3 of 6 votes	Paulie & Natalie D. 3 of 6 votes	Kyle; 2 of 3 votes	Georgia; 2 of 3 votes	Kyle; 4 of 6 votes	Dee; 2 of 3 votes	Hunter; 2 of 3 votes
Called Out	Ashley M. & Chase; Hunter & Georgia's choice	Zach & Zahida; Bananas & Morgan's choice	Natalie N. & JP; Kyle & Mattie's choice	Wes & Dee; Zach & Zahida's choice	Leroy & Shaleen; Da'Vonne & Bear's choice	Kam & Ashley C. Amanda & Josh's choice	Jenna & Gus; Da'Vonne & Bear's choice	Kam & Ashley C. Paulie & Natalie D.'s choice	Bear; Kyle's choice	Nany; Georgia's choice	Theo; Kyle's choice	Da'Vonne; Dee's choice	Natalie D. Hunter's choice
Called Out	Ashley M. & Chase; Hunter & Georgia's choice	Zach & Zahida; Bananas & Morgan's choice	CT & Julia; Natalie N. & JP's choice	Wes & Dee; Zach & Zahida's choice	Leroy & Shaleen; Da'Vonne & Bear's choice	Kam & Ashley C. Amanda & Josh's choice	Jenna & Gus; Da'Vonne & Bear's choice	Kam & Ashley C. Paulie & Natalie D.'s choice	Bear; Kyle's choice	Nany; Georgia's choice	Theo; Kyle's choice	Da'Vonne; Dee's choice	Natalie D. Hunter's choice
Voter	Episodes												
Voter	2	3	4	5	6	7	8	9	10	11	13	14	Finale
Turbo			Kyle & Mattie	Da'Vonne & Bear			Hunter & Georgia		Kyle		Kyle	Dee	Hunter
Theo	Ashley M. & Chase			Jenna & Gus			Kyle & Mattie	Wes & Dee	Wes				Hunter
Wes		Bananas & Morgan			Da'Vonne & Bear	Amanda & Josh	Da'Vonne & Bear			Georgia	Theo		Cara Maria
Natalie D.		Kyle & Mattie	Kyle & Mattie	Zach & Zahida							Kyle		
Cara Maria	Ashley M. & Chase			Zach & Zahida			Kyle & Mattie	Nany & Turbo				Da'Vonne	
Hunter			Amanda & Josh		Da'Vonne & Bear			Wes & Dee					
Mattie					Paulie & Natalie D.			Paulie & Natalie D.		Georgia			
Georgia			Amanda & Josh		Amanda & Josh			Paulie & Natalie D.			Kyle		
Da'Vonne						Kam & Ashley C.					Hunter		
Paulie		Kyle & Mattie	Kyle & Mattie	Zach & Zahida					Kyle		Kyle	Dee	
Dee		Bananas & Morgan			Da'Vonne & Bear	Amanda & Josh	Da'Vonne & Bear			Da'Vonne			
Kyle					Paulie & Natalie D.			Paulie & Natalie D.					
Nany			CT & Julia	Da'Vonne & Bear			Da'Vonne & Bear						
Bear						Paulie & Natalie D.							
Kam		Amanda & Josh											
Ashley C.		Bananas & Morgan											
Jenna						Amanda & Josh							
Gus						Amanda & Josh							
Amanda	Zach & Zahida												
Josh	Hunter & Georgia												
Leroy													
Shaleen													
Zach													
Zahida													
CT													
JP													
Julia													
Natalie N.													
Bananas	Hunter & Georgia												
Morgan	Hunter & Georgia												
Ashley M.													
Chase													
Alan													
Liz													

== Episodes ==
No. overall	No. in season	Title	Original release date	US viewers (millions)
422	1	"Apocalypse Now"	February 6, 2019	0.84
423	2	"Hellraiser"	February 13, 2019	0.78
424	3	"Casualties of War"	February 20, 2019	0.83
425	4	"It's Complicated"	February 27, 2019	0.85
426	5	"The Greatest Showman"	March 6, 2019	0.84
427	6	"In Love and War"	March 13, 2019	0.84
428	7	"This Means War"	March 20, 2019	0.95
429	8	"Liar, Liar"	March 27, 2019	1.08
430	9	"American Psycho"	April 3, 2019	0.84
431	10	"To All the Partners I've Loved Before"	April 10, 2019	0.93
432	11	"A Simple Plan"	April 17, 2019	0.76
433	12	"Lost in Translation"	April 24, 2019	0.88
434	13	"Final Destination"	May 1, 2019	0.81
435	14	"The Waterboy"	May 8, 2019	0.79
436	15	"Death Race"	May 15, 2019	0.78
437	16	"This Is the End"	May 22, 2019	1.04

=== Reunion special ===
The two part reunion special aired on May 29, 2019 and was hosted by WWE pro wrestler, The Real World: Back to New York alum, and former Challenge champion Mike "The Miz" Mizanin and Olympian and The Challenge: Champs vs. Pros alumna Lolo Jones. Cast members attended in London, England. The first part received 0.55 million viewers along with a 0.3 18–49 demo rating, the second part dropped slightly to 0.50 million but matched the demo rating.

== Controversy ==
Cast member Amanda Garcia claimed on her social media that fellow castmates Johnny Devenanzio, Theo Campbell and Kyle Christie used tape to cover her mouth and tie her against her will after an argument. Paulie Calafiore and Da'Vonne Rogers spoke about what allegedly happened, calling the incident "disturbing". A petition was also launched, demanding the network to release the unaired footage. The situation was addressed in the second part of the reunion special.
