= Aycan Yanaç =

German-born Turkish footballer

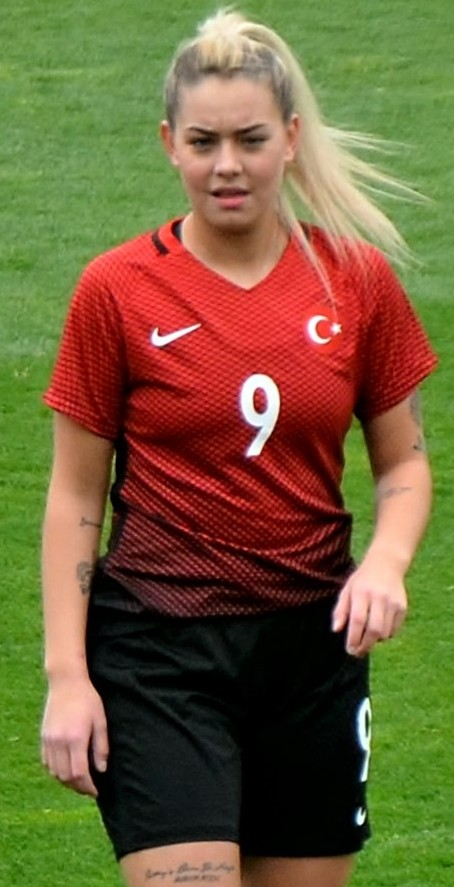
- Yanaç playing for Turkey national in April 2018.

Personal information
- Date of birth: 21 November 1998 (age 27)
- Place of birth: Nuremberg, Bavaria, Germany
- Position: Forward

Senior career*
Years	Team	Apps	(Gls)
- 1. FC Nürnberg
2015	SpVgg Greuther Fürth	11	(3)
2016–2018	1. FC Nürnberg II		
2018	FC Ingolstadt 04 II		
2019	SpVgg Greuther Fürth II		
2019	SV Frensdorf		
2020–2022	ALG Spor	1	(0)
2023–2024	Fatih Karagümrük	10	(3)

International career
2015	Turkey U-19	7	(0)
2018	Turkey	1	(0)
- * Club domestic league appearances and goals

Aycan Yanaç (born 21 November 1998) is a German-born Turkish footballer, who plays as a forward.

== Early life ==
Yanaç was born to Turkish immigrant parents in Nuremberg, Bavaria, Germany on 21 November 1998.

== Club career ==
Yanac plays in the forward position. In July 2015, Yanac transferred from 1. FC Nürnberg to the club SpVgg Greuther Fürth playing in the Frauen-Regionalliga Süd (Women's Regional League South). She played eleven matches in two seasons 2014–15 and 2015–16, and scored three goals. In December of the same year, she returned her previous club. She later joined 1. FC Nürnberg II playing in the "Frauen Landesliga Nord – Bayern" (Women's States League North – Bavaria).

By August 2020, she moved to Turkey, and signed with the Gaziantep-based club ALG Spor, which were to play in the first qualifying round of the 2020–21 UEFA Women's Champions League.

== International career ==
Yanaç was admitted to the Turkey women's national U-19 team, and played for the first time at the UEFA Development Tournament match against Bosnia and Herzegovina on 4 August 2015. She took part in two matches of the 2016 UEFA Women's Under-19 Championship qualification – Group 4. She capped seven times in total.

She was called up to the Turkey women's national team debuting in the friendly match against Estonia on 7 April 2018.

== Reality show participation ==
In 2020, she participated in the celebrities team of the reality show Survivor Turkey 7th Celebrities vs Volunteers, where she was eliminated on day 109.
