= Nihat Doğan =

- Born: 13 February 1976 (age 50); Istanbul, Turkey
- Genres: Arabesque, Fantezi, Turkish folk
- Occupations: Actor, Singer, musician, media presenter
- Years active: 1994–present

Nihat Doğan (born 13 February 1976) is a Turkish singer of Kurdish descent. With the release of his first album Kırdın Kalbimi in 1994 he started his professional music career. With participating in Survivor Turkey in 2011 he gained more popularity.

== Life ==
Nihat Doğan was born on 13 February 1976 in Istanbul. At the age of eleven he lost his father. The elders of his family wanted to take him to Muş but he refused to go and stayed in Istanbul. His talent in singing was discovered at a tea garden in Avcılar, Istanbul, and a couple who were residents of Germany helped him reside there. After staying there for one year, he decided to return to Turkey to pursue a career in music.

Doğan identifies as a Conservative democrat.

== Other works ==
On 22 October 2012, Doğan announced on his Twitter account that he was appointed as the technical director of Büyükderespor, and amateur third class team from Istanbul. As Doğan does not have a diploma in directorship he does not hold the position officially. Following Turkish Football Federation's statement that "if necessary, the technical director of a club could be appointed as the head and admin of a team" Doğan took the management of the team.

== Discography ==
=== Studio albums ===
- 1994: Kırdın Kalbimi
- 1996: Ayrılık Acı Birşey
- 1998: Anlamıyorlar
- 2000: Dayan Yüreğim
- 2001: Züleyha
- 2002: Zor Gelir
- 2004: Seve Seve
- 2005: Bitanesinden Bitanesine
- 2007: Allah Belanı Versin
- 2009: 1071

=== Singles ===
- 2011: "Arayamadım"
- 2014: "O Da Can"
- 2018: "Hey Gidi Hey"
- 2019: "Hercai"

== Filmography ==
- 2001: Sultan
- 2013: Harem (supporting role)

=== Programs ===
- Survivor: Ünlüler vs. Gönüllüler – (2012)
- Söylemezsem Olmaz – (2017) – TV presenter
- Survivor 2018 – (2018)
