= Turabi Çamkıran =

Turkish actor (born 1987)

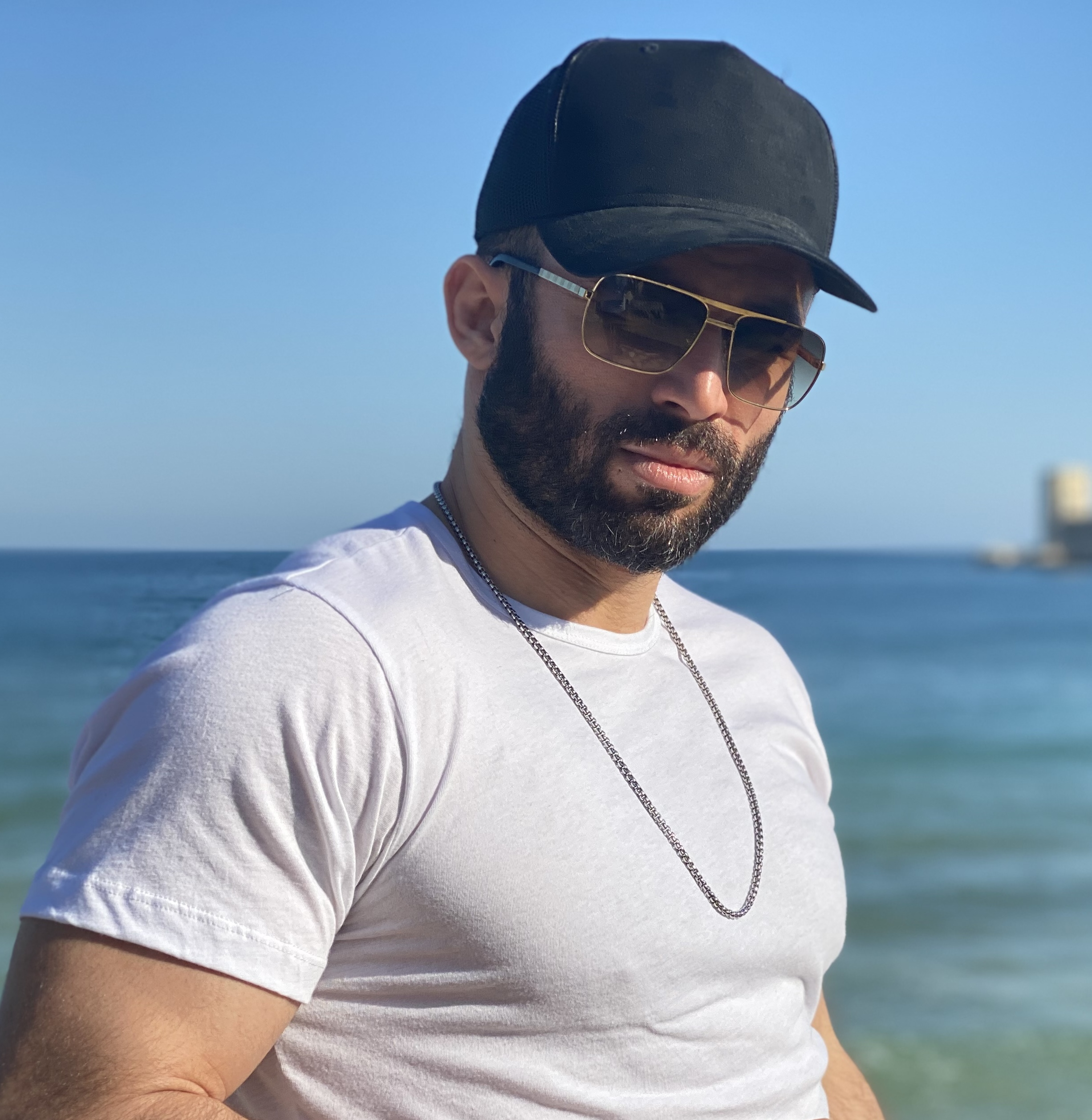
- Çamkıran in 2020
- Born: 3 July 1987 (age 39); Mersin, Turkey
- Other name: Turbo Turabi
- Education: Mersin University
- Years active: 2013–present
- Known for: Survivor Türkiye; Releasing the controversial song "Wine Me, Dine Me"

Turabi Çamkıran (born 3 July 1987), better known by his mononymous stage name Turabi, is a Turkish singer and actor. He is often also called Turbo Turabi.

== Early life ==
Çamkıran was born in 1987 in Mersin; however, his family is originally from Kahramanmaraş. He dropped out of school, but later finished it at the age of 28 after appearing on Survivor Turkey in 2014. He studied at the University of Mersin.

== Career ==
He took part in Yetenek Sizsiniz Türkiye in 2013 and went on to reach the semi-finals. He also won Survivor Turkey in 2014 and again in 2015. He also took part in various films. In 2019, he took part in the American reality competition series The Challenge: War of the Worlds and won. He also took part in a German reality competition.

== Personal life ==
In 2025, Çamkıran lost all his assets in the Los Angeles wildfires. On Instagram, he announced that he wished to return to Turkey.

== Controversies ==
After releasing his song "Wine Me, Dine Me", he became famous on social media, getting called a "Greek singer" and referred to by mockingly Greek-sounding names like "Turabiki" or "Touravis" by Turks who viewed the song as embarrassing. He was issued an arrest warrant by the Turkish government for the profane lyrics. Additionally, the Turkish Ministry of Family and Social Services requested a ban on the song, claiming that the lyrics were misogynistic and could negatively effect the mental development of children. The ban caused Turabi to re-release the song with the title "Kiss Me, Hug Me", which included modified lyrics.

== Filmography ==
=== Film ===
- 2014: Sabit Kanca 2
- 2016: Kertenkele
- 2021: Avcı: İlk Kehanet

=== TV series ===
- 2016: Kertenkele: Yeniden Doğuş

=== Reality competition ===
- 2013: Yetenek Sizsiniz Türkiye
- 2014: Survivor 2014
- 2015: Survivor All Star
- 2016: Beyaz Show
- 2016: Buyur Bi De Burdan Bak
- 2018: Survivor 2018
- 2019: The Challenge: War of the Worlds
- 2019: The Challenge: War of the Worlds 2
- 2019: Müge ve Gülşen'le 2. Sayfa
- 2019: Gel Konuşalım
- 2019: Survivor Panorama
- 2022: The Challenge: Ride or Dies
- 2024: Survivor All Star 2024
- 2024: Exatlon Germany
- 2025: The Challenge All Stars: Rivals
- 2025: The Challenge: Vets & New Threats

=== Guest appearances ===
- 2009: Salla
- 2009: Haydi Bastır
- 2010: Pardon
- 2011: Yalanı Boşver
- 2011: Sözümden Dönmem
- 2011: Superman

== Discography ==
- 2025: "Wine Me, Dine Me"
- 2025: "Dur Abi, Sus Abi"
- 2025: "Kiss Me, Hug Me"
- 2025: "Ben Sen O"
