= Georgia Harrison =

English television personality (born 1994)

Georgia Harrison MBE
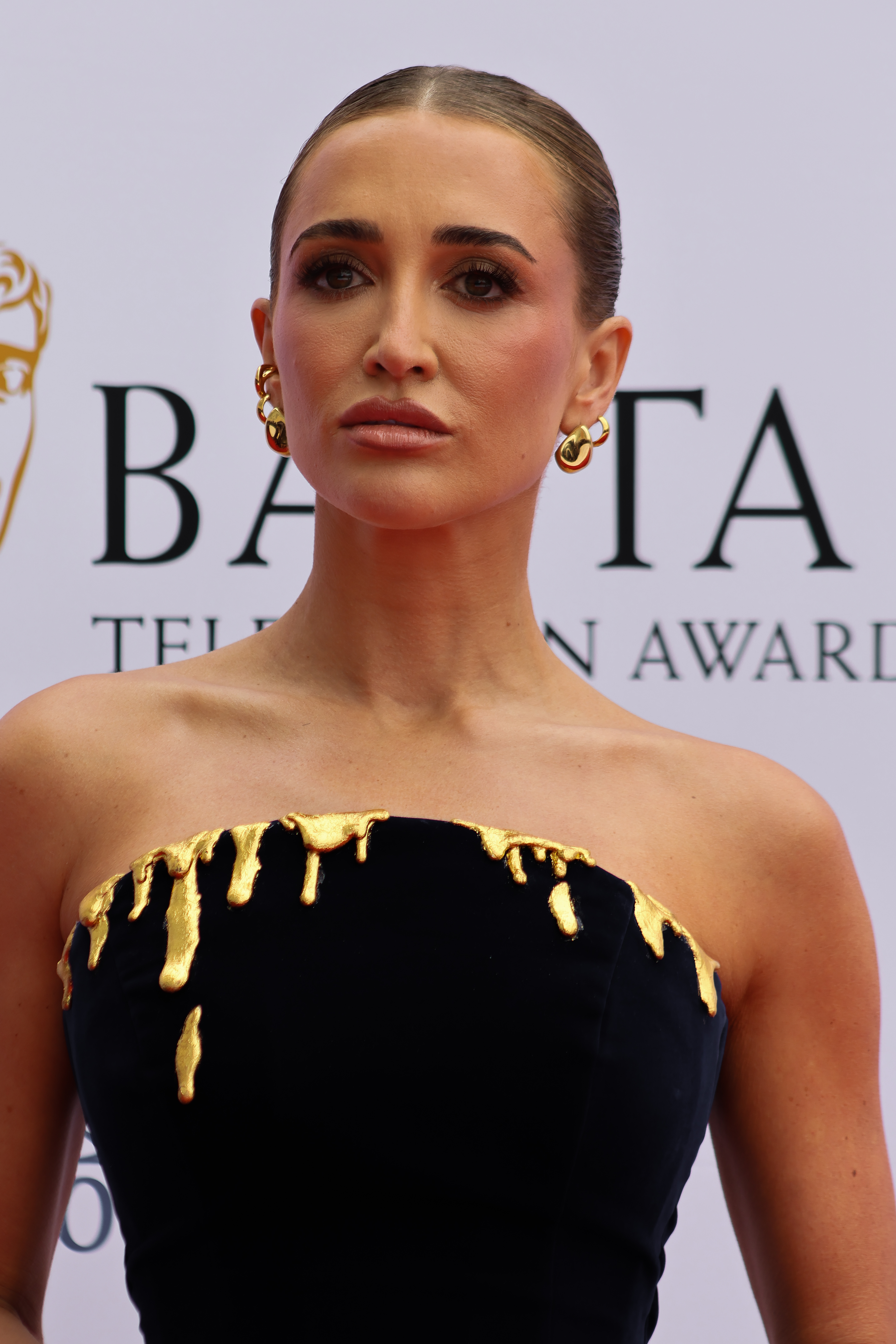
- Harrison in 2026
- Born: Georgia Louise Harrison; 12 December 1994 (age 31); Redbridge, London, England
- Occupations: Television personality; campaigner
- Years active: 2014–present
- Television: The Only Way Is Essex; Love Island; The Challenge: War of the Worlds; The Challenge: War of the Worlds 2; Celebrity Ex on the Beach; Love Island: All-Stars
- Children: 1

Georgia Louise Harrison MBE (born 12 December 1994), is an English television personality and campaigner.

After making her debut as a cast member on the ITVBe reality series The Only Way Is Essex in 2014, Harrison appeared on the third series of Love Island in 2017, and has since appeared on various other television shows including The Challenge: War of the Worlds and The Challenge: War of the Worlds 2 (2019), Celebrity Ex on the Beach (2020), and returned for the first series of Love Island: All Stars (2024).

Harrison has fronted the documentaries Revenge Porn: Georgia vs Bear (2023) and the two-part series Georgia Harrison: Porn, Power, Profit (2025), both highlighting issues around Image-Based Sexual Abuse. In 2025, she was appointed Member of the Order of the British Empire (MBE) for services to the prevention of violence against women and girls, and for her campaigning on online privacy and cyber crime.

== Early life ==
Georgia Louise Harrison was born on 12 December 1994 in the London Borough of Redbridge, London. She grew up and struggled with undiagnosed ADHD, which got her expelled from school as a teenager. Prior to appearing on reality television, she worked as a personal assistant.

== Career ==
In 2014, Harrison joined the cast of the ITVBe reality series The Only Way Is Essex for the show's thirteenth series. In 2017, she became a contestant on the third series of the ITV2 reality dating show Love Island. She was the final "bombshell" to enter the series on Day 34 and was dumped on Day 46. In 2018, she appeared on the 5Star series Celebrity Ghost Hunt.

In 2019, Harrison competed in the MTV reality competition The Challenge: War of the Worlds, finishing in eighth place. Later that year, she competed in the next series, The Challenge: War of the Worlds 2, and was eliminated in the tenth episode. Whilst competing in The Challenge, she met television personality Stephen Bear, whom she dated until July 2019. Harrison also appeared on the first series of Celebrity Ex on the Beach and came joint first on the sixth series of Celebrity SAS: Who Dares Wins. In 2024, she appeared as a contestant on the spin-off series Love Island: All-Stars.

== Stephen Bear case ==
In December 2020, Harrison discovered that her ex-boyfriend Stephen Bear uploaded CCTV footage of the pair having sex to his OnlyFans account that was filmed and published without Harrison's consent, and reported it to police. In the criminal trial that concluded in December 2022, Bear was sentenced to 21 months in prison after being found guilty of voyeurism and disclosing private, sexual photographs and films. Harrison described giving evidence in the trial as excruciating, that she was sitting in the witness box while the jury of nine men and three women looked through pages of video stills, confirming that each featured her; saying "I could tell the jury was absolutely cringing" and "I was in a private garden in a private moment that I thought was between me and one other person. To know people have seen it is hard. To see people seeing it while they can see you is harder."

Bear was released from HMP Brixton in January 2024 after serving 10 months of his original sentence, and remained on licence under conditions for the rest of the original sentence.

In the civil claim, Bear was ordered to pay Harrison £207,900 in compensation damages, which she stated she would be partly donating to multiple charities that supported her and other victims of image-based sexual abuse. However, in March 2024, the court heard that none of the damages had yet been paid, and gave Bear a confiscation order of £22,305 that came from profits he illegally made from uploading the footage, which was paid to HM Treasury and distributed to police charities.

== Campaigning against sexual abuse ==
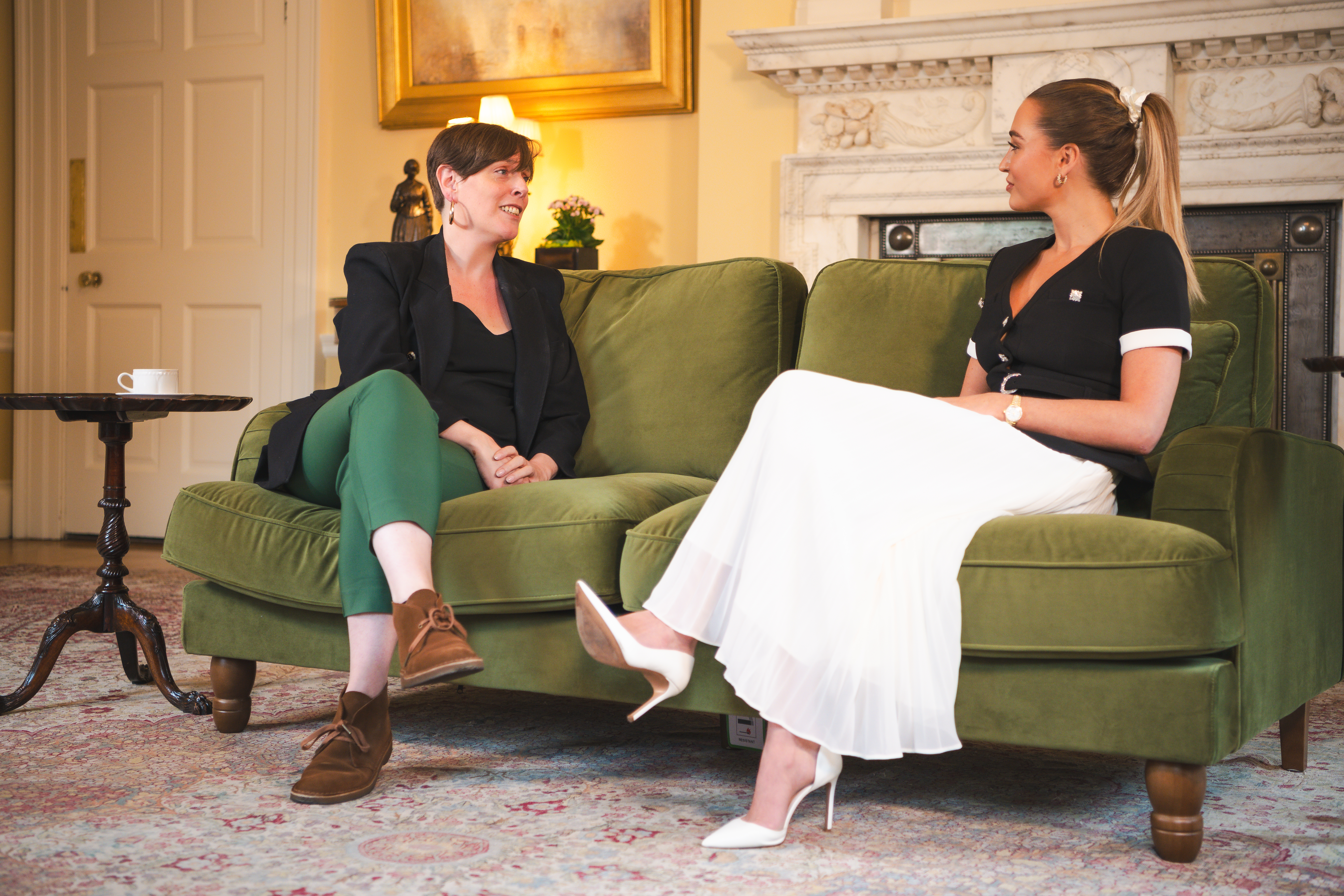
Harrison with Jess Phillips, Minister for Safeguarding, at 10 Downing Street to discuss image-based sexual abuse in September 2024

During the criminal and civil cases, Harrison waived her right to anonymity in order to raise awareness about the impact this type of crime can have on victims. Harrison has campaigned to increase the support for women and girls who have faced sexual crimes.

Harrison's campaigning led to the government's crackdown on image-based abuse through reforms to the Online Safety Act, which passed in October 2023. As part of the Women and Equalities Committee, Harrison worked on improving timescales for women who want to report crimes against them. Justice Minister Edward Argar said "the true courage shown by Georgia Harrison to tell her story will help empower more victims to come forward and get the justice they deserve."

Harrison subsequently recalled her experience of becoming a victim of revenge porn in an ITV2 documentary, Revenge Porn: Georgia vs Bear, in March 2023.

Speaking outside the March 2024 court hearing, Harrison said "nobody has the right to earn money from any crime but to earn so much from image-based sexual abuse is quite frankly abhorrent."

Harrison has also campaigned for better consent education, partnering with Superdrug for the 'You before Yes' campaign, launching the 'Consent Conversations' campaign with Thames Valley Police aimed at young adults, and supporting primary school workshops.

== Personal life ==
In October 2023, Harrison spoke at the Labour Party conference and subsequently revealed she had been in talks with the party over the possibility of standing to be a Member of Parliament for an Essex constituency.

In April 2025, Harrison announced that she was expecting her first child with her partner, Jack Stacey. Their daughter was born in October 2025.

== Awards ==
In November 2023, Harrison was named in the BBC's 100 Women list as one of the world's inspiring and influential women.

Harrison was appointed an MBE in the 2025 King's Birthday Honours for her work on online privacy and cyber crime.

== Filmography ==
As herself
Year	Title	Notes	Ref.
2014	The Only Way Is Essex	Main cast	
2017	Love Island	Contestant; series 3	
2018	Celebrity Ghost Hunt	Main cast	
2019	The Challenge: War of the Worlds	Contestant	
2019	The Challenge: War of the Worlds 2	Contestant	
2020	Celebrity Ex on the Beach	Main cast	
2023	Revenge Porn: Georgia vs Bear	Documentary	
2024	Love Island: All-Stars	Contestant	
2024	Celebrity SAS: Who Dares Wins	Contestant; series 6	
