= Survivor Türkiye =

Turkish reality television franchise

- Created by: Charlie Parsons
- Presented by: Acun Ilıcalı
- Country of origin: Turkey
- Original language: Turkish
- No. of seasons: 20

Production
- Producer: Acun Ilıcalı
- Production locations: Dominican Republic, Cyprus, Turkey
- Production company: Acun Medya

Original release
- Network: Kanal D (2005); Show TV (2006–2012); Star TV (2013–2014); TV8 (2015–)
- Release: 22 March 2005 – present

Related
- Expedition Robinson; Survivor (American TV series)

Survivor Türkiye (formerly Survivor Turkey) is the Turkish version of the popular reality series Survivor. This version of the show has aired on both Kanal D in 2005, and on Show TV in 2006, 2007, and 2010. From the beginning, Survivor was a success in Turkey, however, the cost of producing the show proved to be too much for Kanal D and even Show TV could not afford to produce the show on a yearly basis. Because of production costs, the show was put on hiatus in 2007 and was brought back three years later. The prize for the first seasons of the show was €150,000, for the second and third seasons €250,000, and US$500,000 for the fourth season. Following its time on Show TV, the series moved briefly to Star TV (2013–2014) before transitioning to TV8 in 2015. Since then, it has aired annually on TV8, becoming one of the most-watched programs in Turkey with long-running formats like Ünlüler vs. Gönüllüler. The latest season premiered on January 1, 2026, and is currently ongoing.

== Format and rules ==
Turkish Survivor followed a similar format as the American Survivor, but with some differences.

In the Turkish version, there are some minor changes in each season when it comes to how the game is played, how contestants are eliminated, and how the game is won. One thing that has not changed throughout the seasons is that in order to win the game a contestant must earn the most "points", these points are typically earned through votes or winning challenges.

Unlike the original series, viewers vote for their favorites to select the winner each week and in the final. The players never cast votes during tribal councils since the inception of the Turkish series which eliminates the most important part of the American series. Another major difference is the length of the show (multiple episodes a week, around 180 mins per episode).

== All seasons ==
=== (Season 1): Türkiye: Büyük Macera ===
The first season, Survivor Büyük Macera, premiered on March 22, 2005, and aired for thirteen weeks and is the only season that was hosted by Ahmet Utlu. This season resembled Expedition Robinson more so than Survivor in the way that the tribes were divided up into two groups known as the North (Kuzey) and South (Güney) teams. From early on in the game alliances came into play as the four younger members of the North team, Ebru Demiray, Irmak Arkadaşlar, Kemal Pekser, and Selin Yardımcı quickly formed an alliance. Because of this, and the fact that the South team proved better at the challenges, none of the four elder members of the North team made it to the merge. Following the merge, the surviving members of the North team struggled to find a hole in the South team six and were one by one picked off until only former South team members remained in the game. When it came time for the final four the contestants competed in the infamous "Plank" competition. Uğur Pektaş won this first challenge and eliminated Delim from the game. In the second semi-final competition, the other two members of the final three competed against each other for the remaining spot in the final two. They also could earn a point by winning either the viewer vote or the jury vote. Ultimately, it was Uğur Pektaş who won this season over Özgür Şimşek with a higher combined vote count of the jury and public's votes.

Contestant	Original Tribe	Merged Tribe	Finish
Bora Bölükbaşı; 33, Istanbul	Kuzey Takımı		1st Voted Out; Day 3
Fulya Keskin; 21, Istanbul	Güney Takımı		2nd Voted Out; Day 6
Semih Şahin; 48, Kocaeli	Kuzey Takımı		3rd Voted Out; Day 9
Tuğba ? 28, Ankara	Kuzey Takımı		4th Voted Out; Day 12
Onur Okyay; 28, Istanbul	Kuzey Takımı		5th Voted Out; Day 15
Özden Yılmaz; 37, Sakarya	Güney Takımı		6th Voted Out; Day 18
Selin Yardımcı; 26, Istanbul	Kuzey Takımı	Merged Tribe	7th Voted Out; 1st Jury Member; Day 21
Ebru Demiray; 24, Istanbul	Kuzey Takımı	Merged Tribe	8th Voted Out; 2nd Jury Member; Day 24
Kemal Pekser; 24, Balıkesir	Kuzey Takımı	Merged Tribe	9th Voted Out; 3rd Jury Member; Day 27
Irmak Arkadaşlar; 23, Ankara	Kuzey Takımı	Merged Tribe	10th Voted Out; 4th Jury Member; Day 30
Bora Uçak; 49, Istanbul	Güney Takımı	Merged Tribe	11th Voted Out; 5th Jury Member; Day 33
Serap Işık; 29, Istanbul	Güney Takımı	Merged Tribe	12th Voted Out; 6th Jury Member; Day 36
Dilem Gözde; 29, Istanbul	Güney Takımı	Merged Tribe	Lost Duel; 7th Jury Member; Day 37
Celal Canbakal; 23, Istanbul	Güney Takımı	Merged Tribe	Lost Duel; 8th Jury Member; 2nd Runner-up; Day 38
Özgür Şimşek; 33, İzmir	Güney Takımı	Merged Tribe	1st Runner-up; Day 39
Uğur Pektaş; 26, Istanbul	Güney Takımı	Merged Tribe	Sole Survivor; Day 39

=== (Season 2): Türkiye - Yunanistan ===
Turkey vs. Greece was the third season of the show. This season was aired from September 2006 to December of that same year. This was the first time that either country's branch of the franchise competed with another country and because of this the major twist this season was that the tribes were divided up by country of origin. The first person to be eliminated this season Vassilis Athanassopoulos, was not voted out but was ejected from the game following the first competition. As an added twist this season, after the merge, the tribe that won immunity would vote for the losing tribe and would count as an extra vote. Early on the Greek tribe struggled to perform at the immunity challenges and because of this the tribe's size quickly dwindled until only four were left (all the others with the exception of Melita Goyait who had been voted out). Though the first two immunity challenges after the tribes began to live together were individual, the rest were all tribal. When there were only four members of each tribe left both tribes competed in a duel in which one member of each tribe (Nadia Zagli from the Greeks and Ipek Esin from the Turks) would be eliminated. When only four competitors remained, the two representatives left from each tribe would have to convince the audience to vote for them to compete in the final challenge as their countries' representative. Eventually, Derya Durmuşlar won the final competition and claimed victory for Turkey over Amfikratis Zachariadis from Greece.

Contestant	Tribe	Finish
Vasilis Athanasopoulos; 24, Anavyssos	Greece	Ejected; Day 2
Maria Nikoloutsou; 21, Ioannina	Greece	1st Voted Out; Day 3
Fulya Gürkan; 25, Istanbul	Turkey	2nd Voted Out; Day 7
Onur Alper Sarmusak; 23, Istanbul	Turkey	3rd Voted Out; Day 10
Ioanna Nikolaou; 26, Messolonghi	Greece	4th Voted Out; Day 16
Çiğdem Mısırlı; 24, Malatya	Turkey	5th Voted Out; Day 21
Stella Kalenderoglou; 36, Athens	Greece	6th Voted Out; Day 23
Melita Gouait; 30, Nea Makri	Greece	7th Voted Out; Day 25
Giannis Zisis; 31, Chalcis	Greece	8th Voted Out; Day 30
Teymuralp Merter Fosforoğlu; 36, Ankara	Turkey	9th Voted Out; Day 34
Arzu Gazioğlu; 18, Istanbul	Turkey	10th Voted Out; Day 40
Metin Gülgez; 35, Ankara	Turkey	11th Voted Out; Day 44
Nadia Zagli; 22, Athens	Greece	Team Duel; Day 45
İpek Esin; 36, Istanbul	Turkey	Team Duel; Day 45
Pantelis Papakonstantinou; 39, Thessaloniki	Greece	12th Voted Out; Day 48
Selim Sabah; 25, Istanbul	Turkey	13th Voted Out; Day 53
Aytuğ Yüksel; 22, Ankara	Turkey	Turkey Votes
Platonas Lemonopoulos; 29, Katerini	Greece	Greek Votes
Amfikratis Zachariadis; 31, Thessaloniki	Greece	Runner-up
Derya Durmuşlar†; 45, Istanbul	Turkey	Sole Survivor

=== (Season 3): Aslanlar - Kanaryalar ===
Survivor Aslanlar vs. Kanaryalar was aired from February to June 2007.

The main twist this season was that the tribes were split into two groups, one being Aslanlar (Lions) and the other Kanaryalar (Canaries). An immediate twist this season was the eliminations of Nihal following two early duels. Another twist used during this season was that after a team lost an immunity challenge they were forced to compete in an individual immunity challenge, where the winner would earn immunity and a second vote to cast at tribal council.

As in the previous season, there was no merge; instead the remaining players competed in duels against members of the other team in order to determine who would be eliminated. When it came time for the final six, both tribes' members competed against other members within their own tribe to determine who would be in the final four.

When it came time for the final four, the contestants competed in two competitions. The first of these was won by Ayşıl Özaslan, who won the first spot in the final two. The second competition was won by Taner Özdeş who won the second spot in the final two. Eventually, it was Taner Özdeş who won this season over fellow Canary Ayşıl Özaslan by a jury vote of 9–0. As two members from the Canary tribe made the final two, only former Canary tribe members were eligible to vote for the winner, with the exception of Aykor.

Contestant	Tribe	Finish
Aykor Öner	Kanaryalar	Lost Duel
Nihal	Aslanlar	Lost Duel
Berrin Aktuğ	Aslanlar	2nd Voted Out
Erkay Çetinsaraç	Kanaryalar	3rd Voted Out; 1st Jury Member
İlgi Müge Güzel	Aslanlar	4th Voted Out
Deniz Oyanay	Aslanlar	5th Voted Out
Pınar Seden Güventürk	Aslanlar	6th Voted Out
Seda Meriç	Kanaryalar	7th Voted Out; 2nd Jury Member
Esra Kanat	Kanaryalar	8th Voted Out; 3rd Jury Member
Yağmur Yılmaz	Kanaryalar	9th Voted Out; 4th Jury Member
Levent Oruç	Aslanlar	10th Voted Out
Halit Emre Kavlak	Aslanlar	11th Voted Out
Ali Orkun Aydoğan	Kanaryalar	12th Voted Out; 5th Jury Member
Cömert Pehlivan	Kanaryalar	13th Voted Out; 6th Jury Member
Mesut Güney	Aslanlar	Lost Duel
Cevdet Özmen	Aslanlar	Lost Duel
Müge Kılıç	Kanaryalar	Lost Duel; 7th Jury Member
Afet Yaprak Yılmaz	Kanaryalar	Lost Duel; 8th Jury Member
Metehan Mert Çakır	Aslanlar	Lost Duel
Cenk Köse	Kanaryalar	Lost Duel; 9th Jury Member
Özlem Çalın	Aslanlar	Lost Duel
Çiğdem Afyük	Aslanlar	Lost Duel; 2nd Runner-up
Ayşıl Özaslan	Kanaryalar	1st Runner-up
Taner Özdeş	Kanaryalar	Sole Survivor

=== (Season 4): Kızlar - Erkekler ===
Survivor Kızlar vs. Erkekler (Survivor: Females vs. Males), was aired from April 17, 2010, to September 18, 2010. The main twist this season was that the tribes were divided by color. However, there were some altered rules, and several tribal councils were decided by competitive challenges, rather than votes alone.

Another altered rule was that, prior to the merge, at tribal council the tribe that had immunity would award immunity to someone from the losing tribe through a vote. The women's tribe lost player Nilgün Karataş to an injury she suffered in the first episode cycle. Because this was not a voluntary exit, she was replaced with Seda Aktuğlu in the second episode cycle. Following the second tribal council, the women experienced a long series of losses at the immunity challenge that eventually withered the tribe down to only four women at the merge.

At what was supposed to be the first post-merge vote, the contestants were told that their votes did not count that round and that they would compete in a challenge to determine who would be eliminated. Metin Avşar lost the challenge and was eliminated. At the post-merge tribal councils, the person with immunity was not permitted to vote. However, beginning with the thirteenth tribal council, they would decide who would duel the person that received the most votes. When it came time for the final three, the jury members voted to eliminate one of them. Aydın Gülşen proved to be the least popular of the finalists with the jury and was eliminated. The final two then competed in two challenges in order to earn "points". They also could earn a point by winning either the viewer vote or the jury vote. Ultimately, it was Merve Oflaz who won this season, over İhsan Tarkan, by a point score of 3–1.

Contestant	Original Tribe	Merged Tribe	Finish
Hicran Işık	Kızlar		1st Voted Out; 1st Jury Member; Day 3
Nilgün Karataş	Kızlar		Evacuated; 2nd Jury Member; Day 5
Metin Özkaya	Erkekler		2nd Voted Out; 3rd Jury Member; Day 6
Canan Karlı	Kızlar		3rd Voted Out; 4th Jury Member; Day 9
Tuğçe Al	Kızlar		4th Voted Out; 5th Jury Member; Day 12
Furkan Dede	Erkekler		5th Voted Out; 6th Jury Member; Day 15
Ezgi Sözüer	Kızlar		6th Voted Out; 7th Jury Member; Day 18
Seda Şer	Kızlar		7th Voted Out; 8th Jury Member; Day 21
Berke Sarp	Kızlar		8th Voted Out; 9th Jury Member; Day 24
Metin Avşar	Erkekler	Merged Tribe/Ante Merging Party	Lost Duel; 10th Jury Member; Day 27
Gizem Hatipoğlu	Kızlar	Merged Tribe/Ante Merging Party	9th Voted Out; 11th Jury Member; Day 30
Hakan Hatipoğlu	Erkekler	Merged Tribe/Ante Merging Party	10th Voted Out; 12th Jury Member; Day 33
Emin Sefer	Erkekler	Merged Tribe/Ante Merging Party	11th Voted Out; 13th Jury Member; Day 36
Kemal Özcanlı	Erkekler	Merged Tribe/Ante Merging Party	Lost Duel; 14th Jury Member; Day 39
Seda Aktuğlu	Kızlar	Merged Tribe/Ante Merging Party	Lost Duel; 15th Jury Member; Day 41
Başak Özer	Kızlar	Merged Tribe/Ante Merging Party	Lost Duel; 16th Jury Member; Day 41
Oğuzhan Eroğlu	Erkekler	Merged Tribe/Ante Merging Party	Lost Duel; 17th Jury Member; Day 41
Ertan Rodoplu	Erkekler	Merged Tribe/Ante Merging Party	Lost Duel; 18th Jury Member; Day 41
Aydın Gülşen	Erkekler	Merged Tribe/Ante Merging Party	12th Voted Out; 19th Jury Member; 2nd Runner-up; Day 45
İhsan Tarkan	Erkekler	Merged Tribe/Ante Merging Party	1st Runner-up; Day 48
Merve Oflaz	Kızlar	Merged Tribe/Ante Merging Party	Sole Survivor; Day 48

=== (Season 5): Ünlüler - Gönüllüler ===
Survivor Ünlüler vs. Gönüllüler premiered on April 2, 2011, and aired until June 20, 2011. The main twist this season was that one tribe was composed of seven celebrities and the other seven volunteers. Another twist this season was that when a tribe lost an immunity challenge, they would vote to nominate a member of their tribe to face the public vote. At the same time the other tribe would vote for the second nominee. When the tribes merged, this rule change in a way so that the person who was initially voted to be a nominee would pick the second nominee. Ultimately, it was Derya Büyükuncu who won this season over fellow celebrity Nihat Doğan with seventy four percent of the public vote.

Contestant	Original Tribe	Merging	Finish
Didem Ceran; 30, Kayseri	Gönüllüler		1st Voted Out; Day 5
Vedat Behar; 30, Istanbul	Gönüllüler		2nd Voted Out; Day 10
Zeynep Tunuslu; 49, Istanbul	Ünlüler		3rd Voted Out; Day 15
Gökhan Albayrak; 22, Istanbul	Gönüllüler		4th Voted Out; Day 20
Pascal Nouma; 39, Epinay-sur-Seine	Ünlüler	Ante Merging Party	Disqualified; Day 25
Ceyda Okandan; 25, Istanbul	Gönüllüler	Ante Merging Party	5th Voted Out; Day 30
Asena Çakmak; 34, Istanbul	Ünlüler	Ante Merging Party	6th Voted Out; Day 35
Ebru Destan; 33, Istanbul	Ünlüler	Ante Merging Party	7th Voted Out; Day 40
Tefik Egeli; 30, Ankara	Gönüllüler	Ante Merging Party	8th Voted Out; Day 45
Özge Ulusoy; 29, Ankara	Ünlüler	Ante Merging Party	9th Voted Out; Day 50
Taçmin Tümer; 20, Istanbul	Gönüllüler	Ante Merging Party	10th Voted Out; Day 53
Taner Tolga Tarlacı; 26, Mersin	Gönüllüler	Ante Merging Party	11th Voted Out; 2nd Runner-up; Day 54
Nihat Doğan; 37, Istanbul	Ünlüler	Ante Merging Party	1st Runner-up; Day 55
Derya Büyükuncu; 34, Istanbul	Ünlüler	Ante Merging Party	Sole Survivor; Day 55

=== (Season 6): Ünlüler - Gönüllüler ===
Survivor Ünlüler vs Gönüllüler 2 was aired in 2012. The tribes this year, the Ünlüler ("Celebrities") and the Gönüllüler ("Volunteers"), were the same as in the 2011 season, which was named Ünlüler vs Gönüllüler; hence the addition of a 2. The episodes were aired on Saturday nights by Show TV; the season premiere took place on March 17, 2012.

Contestant	Original Tribe	Switched Tribe	Merged Tribe	Finish
Asena Erdem; 21, Istanbul	Gönüllüler	Gönüllüler		1st Voted Out; Day 10
Sibel Tüzün; 40, Istanbul	Ünlüler	Ünlüler		2nd Voted Out; Day 17
Gülen Sezmiş; 18, Istanbul	Gönüllüler	Gönüllüler		3rd Voted Out; Day 24
Şansın Tokyay; 22, Istanbul	Gönüllüler	Gönüllüler		4th Voted Out; Day 31
Doğuş; 37, Germany	Ünlüler	Ünlüler		5th Voted Out; Day 38
Merve Büyüksaraç; 22, Ankara	Ünlüler	Ünlüler		6th Voted Out; Day 45
Serhat Özcan; 27, Kocaeli	Gönüllüler	Gönüllüler	Ünüller	7th Voted Out; Day 52
Mustafa Topaloğlu; 55, Hopa	Ünlüler	Ünlüler	Ünüller	8th Voted Out; Day 59
Alp Kırşan; 32, Istanbul	Ünlüler	Ünlüler	Ünüller	9th Voted Out; Day 66
Almeda Abazi; 20, Tirana	Ünlüler	Ünlüler	Ünüller	10th Voted Out; Day 73
Cevher Pekçiçek; 22, Istanbul	Gönüllüler	Gönüllüler	Ünüller	11th Voted Out; Day 80
Hayim Kohen; 26, Ankara	Gönüllüler	Gönüllüler	Ünüller	12th Voted Out; Day 87
Ece Begüm Yücetan; 24, İzmir	Gönüllüler	Gönüllüler	Ünüller	13th Voted Out; Day 100
Anıl Tetik; 21, Istanbul	Gönüllüler	Ünlüler	Ünüller	14th Voted Out; 2nd Runner-up; Day 101
Hasan Yalnızoğlu; 38, Rize	Gönüllüler	Gönüllüler	Ünüller	1st Runner-up; Day 102
Nihat Altınkaya; 32, Karabük	Ünlüler	Ünlüler	Ünüller	Sole Survivor; Day 102

=== (Season 7): Ünlüler - Gönüllüler ===
Survivor Ünlüler vs Gönüllüler was aired in 2013. The tribes this year, the Ünlüler ("Celebrities") and the Gönüllüler ("Volunteers"), were the same as in the years 2011 and 2012, which was named Ünlüler vs Gönüllüler; hence the addition of a 3. The episodes were aired on Saturday, Sunday and Monday nights by Star TV; the season premiere took place on March 17, 2013. Host of this season are Acun Ilıcalı and Alp Kırşan.

Contestant	Original Tribe	Switched Tribe	Finish	Performance
Emel Erdemanar; 25, Dammam, Saudi Arabia	Gönüllüler		1st Voted Out; Day 10	50%
Seda Akman; 29, Istanbul	Gönüllüler		2nd Voted Out; Day 17	50%
Mustafa Sürmen; 24, İzmir	Gönüllüler		3rd Voted Out; Day 24	30%
Nazenin Tokuşoğlu; 35, Istanbul	Ünlüler		4th Voted Out; Day 31	57%
Larissa Gacemer; 25, São Paulo, Brazil	Ünlüler		5th Voted Out; Day 38	73%
Erhan Yavuz; 33, Istanbul	Ünlüler		6th Voted Out; Day 45	42%
Bozok Gören; 39, Istanbul	Gönüllüler		7th Voted Out; Day 52	41%
Fatmagül Fakı; 23, Konya	Gönüllüler	Gönüllüler	8th Voted Out; Day 59	29%
Bennu Gerede; 42, Istanbul	Ünlüler	Ünlüler	9th Voted Out; Day 67	49%
Duygu Çetinkaya; 27, Denizli	Gönüllüler	Gönüllüler	10th Voted Out; Day 74	59%
Dağhan Külegeç; 34, Istanbul	Ünlüler	Gönüllüler	11th Voted Out; Day 81	45%
Irmak Atuk; 28, İzmir	Ünlüler	Ünlüler	12th Voted Out; Day 87	39%
Cengiz Coşkun; 30, Istanbul	Ünlüler	Ünlüler	13th Voted Out; Day 94	46%
Murat Ceylan; 24, Istanbul	Gönüllüler	Gönüllüler	14th Voted Out; Day 106	51%
Ümit Karan; 37, Berlin, Germany	Ünlüler	Ünlüler	15th Voted Out; 2nd Runner-up; Day 107	52%
Doğukan Manço; 31, Liège, Belgium	Ünlüler	Ünlüler	1st Runner-up; Day 108	58%
Hilmi Cem İntepe; 21, Muğla	Gönüllüler	Gönüllüler	Sole Survivor; Day 108	54%

=== (Season 8): Ünlüler - Gönüllüler ===
Survivor Ünlüler vs Gönüllüler 4 aired in March until June 2014. The tribes this year, the Ünlüler ("Celebrities") and the Gönüllüler ("Volunteers"), is the same as in the years 2011, 2012 and 2013, which was named Ünlüler vs Gönüllüler; hence the addition of a 4.

Contestant	Original Tribe	Switched Tribe	Second Switch	Finish	Performance	sms
Ekrem Toraman; 31, Istanbul	Gönüllüler	Gönüllüler		1st Voted Out; Day 14	25%	1.567
Eda Özerkan; 29, Adana	Ünlüler	Ünlüler		2nd Voted Out; Day 21	40%	3.504
Samanta Mendes; 28, Guinea-Bissau	Gönüllüler	Gönüllüler		3rd Voted Out; Day 28	35%	4.412
Berna Canbeldek; 24, İzmir	Gönüllüler	Gönüllüler		Disqualified; Day 42	46%	Disqualified
Ertunga Gemuhluoğlu; 55, Istanbul	Gönüllüler	Gönüllüler		4th Voted Out; Day 49	30%	12.937
Mert Palavaroğlu; 21, Istanbul	Gönüllüler	Gönüllüler		5th Voted Out; Day 56	42%	19.828
İsmail Baki Tuncer; 36, Istanbul	Ünlüler	Ünlüler	Ünlüler	6th Voted Out; Day 70	43%	29.098
Duygu Bal; 26, Ankara	Ünlüler	Ünlüler	Gönüllüler	7th Voted Out; Day 77	49%	26.395
Müge Uzel; 25, İzmir	Gönüllüler	Gönüllüler	Gönüllüler	8th Voted Out; Day 84	22%	31.496
Serenay Aktaş; 20, Istanbul	Ünlüler	Ünlüler	Ünlüler	9th Voted Out; Day 91	44%	39.007
Akın Saatçi; 31, London	Gönüllüler	Ünlüler	Gönüllüler	10th Voted Out; Day 98	54%	42.497
Tolga Karel; 37, İzmir	Ünlüler	Ünlüler	Ünlüler	11th Voted Out; Day 105	39%	40.678
Sahra Işik; 23, Istanbul	Gönüllüler	Gönüllüler	Gönüllüler	12th Voted Out; Day 112	49%	45.710
Yiğit Dikmen; 27, Istanbul	Gönüllüler	Gönüllüler	Gönüllüler	13th Voted Out; Day 113	53%	48.626
Ahmet Dursun; 36, Gelsenkirchen	Ünlüler	Ünlüler	Ünlüler	14th/15th Voted Out; Day 114	49%	43.001
Merve Aydın; 23, Istanbul	Ünlüler	Ünlüler	Ünlüler	14th/15th Voted Out; 2nd Runner-up; Day 114	59%	56.915
Gökhan Keser; 26, İzmir	Ünlüler	Ünlüler	Ünlüler	1st Runner-up; Day 115	56%	67.926
Turabi Çamkıran; 26 Mersin	Gönüllüler	Gönüllüler	Gönüllüler	Sole Survivor; Day 115	59%	79.280

=== (Season 9): All Star ===
This season was broadcast by TV8 and was presented by Acun Ilıcalı. Several former castaways claimed to have either declined the offer to return for All-Star or been cut from the cast.

Contestant	Original Tribe	Finish	Performance	Final Symbols
Duygu Çetinkaya; 29, Denizli; Survivor: Ünlüler – Gönüllüler 3	Gönüllüler	1st Voted Out; Day 11	33%	0
Fulya Keskin; 31, Istanbul; Survivor: Büyük Macera	Ünlüler	2nd Voted Out; Day 18	20%	0
Ahmet Dursun; 37, Gelsenkirchen; Survivor: Ünlüler – Gönüllüler 4	Ünlüler	Evacuated; Day 25	18%	0
Seda Aktuğlu; 30, Istanbul; Survivor: Kızlar – Erkekler	Gönüllüler	4th Voted Out; Day 32	22%	0
Almeda Abazi; 23, Tirana; Survivor: Ünlüler – Gönüllüler 2	Ünlüler	5th Voted Out; Day 39	62%	0
Taner Özdeş; 30, Istanbul; Survivor: Aslanlar – Kanaryalar	Gönüllüler	6th Voted Out; Day 46	35%	0
Merve Oflaz; 26, Istanbul; Survivor: Kızlar – Erkekler	Ünlüler	7th Voted Out; Day 54	24%	0
Özlem Çalın; 32, Istanbul; Survivor: Aslanlar – Kanaryalar	Gönüllüler	8th Voted Out; Day 61	43%	0
Pascal Nouma; 43, Epinay-sur-Seine; Survivor: Ünlüler – Gönüllüler	Ünlüler	9th Voted Out; Day 75	30%	0
Nadya Zagli; 31, Athens; Survivor: Türkiye – Yunanistan	Gönüllüler	10th Voted Out; Day 82	49%	1
Sahra Işık; 24, Istanbul; Survivor: Ünlüler – Gönüllüler 4	Gönüllüler	11th Voted Out; Day 89	45%	0
Berna Canbeldek; 25, İzmir; Survivor: Ünlüler – Gönüllüler 4	Ünlüler	12th Voted Out; Day 96	61%	2
Bozok Gören; 41, Istanbul; Survivor: Ünlüler – Gönüllüler 3	Gönüllüler	13th Voted Out; Day 103	52%	2
Anıl Tetik; 24, Istanbul; Survivor: Ünlüler – Gönüllüler 2	Ünlüler	14th Voted Out; Day 109	31%	2
Serenay Aktaş; 21, Istanbul; Survivor: Ünlüler – Gönüllüler 4	Ünlüler	15th Voted Out; Day 115	55%	3
Doğukan Manço; 33, Belgium; Survivor: Ünlüler – Gönüllüler 3	Ünlüler	16th Voted Out; Day 121	46%	0
Hakan Hatipoğlu; 35, Çanakkale; Survivor: Kızlar – Erkekler	Ünlüler	17th Voted Out; Day 126	43%	0
Hasan Yalnızoğlu; 40, Rize; Survivor: Ünlüler – Gönüllüler 2	Gönüllüler	18th Voted Out; Day 128	54%	4
Ece Begüm Yücetan; 27, İzmir; Survivor: Ünlüler – Gönüllüler 2	Gönüllüler	19th/20th Voted Out; Day 132	45%	2
Hilmi Cem İntepe; 23, Muğla; Survivor: Ünlüler – Gönüllüler 3	Gönüllüler	19th/20th Voted Out; 2nd Runner-up; Day 132	63%	2
Merve Aydın; 24, Istanbul; Survivor: Ünlüler – Gönüllüler 4	Ünlüler	1st Runner-up; Day 134	54%	6
Turabi Çamkıran; 27 Mersin; Survivor: Ünlüler – Gönüllüler 4	Gönüllüler	Sole Survivor; Day 134	64%	4 (Symbol Winner)

=== (Season 10): Ünlüler - Gönüllüler ===
Survivor Ünlüler Gönüllüler 2016 was the tenth season of the show. Çağan Atakan Arslan won the competition.

Contestant	Original Tribe	Switched Tribe	Finish	Performance	Final Symbols
Serkan Ercan; 34, Istanbul	Ünlüler	Ünlüler	Evacuated; Day 10 (Illness)	0%	0
Yağmur Özdemir; 20, Bursa	Ünlüler	Ünlüler	2nd Voted Out; Day 25	25%	0
Aylin Şallı; 25, Istanbul	Gönüllüler	Gönüllüler	3rd Voted Out; Day 32	54%	0
Ebru Öztürk; 31, Istanbul	Ünlüler	Ünlüler	4th Voted Out; Day 39	45%	0
Nihal Candan; 20, Istanbul	Gönüllüler	Gönüllüler	5th Voted Out; Day 46	14%	0
Eda Akkaya; 26, Istanbul	Ünlüler	Ünlüler	6th Voted Out; Day 53	39%	0
Seda Tetik; 25, Ankara	Ünlüler	Ünlüler	Evacuated; Day 60 (Injury)	61%	0
Yılmaz Morgül; 52, Istanbul	Ünlüler	Ünlüler	8th Voted Out; Day 67	21%	0
Mehmet Özyay; 24, Birmingham	Ünlüler	Ünlüler	9th Voted Out; Day 74	38%	0
Zafer Mete; 25, Istanbul	Gönüllüler	Gönüllüler	Disqualified; Day 76	38%	0
Tuğba Özay; 37, İzmir	Ünlüler	Ünlüler	11th Voted Out; Day 81	37%	0
Ezgi Avci; 20, Istanbul	Ünlüler	Ünlüler	12th Voted Out; Day 88	41%	1
Gizem Kerimoğlu; 27, Istanbul	Gönüllüler	Gönüllüler	13th Voted Out; Day 95	36%	0
Gizem Memiç; 25, Ankara	Gönüllüler	Gönüllüler	14th Voted Out; Day 102	54%	3
Ibrahim Yattara; 34, Kamsar	Ünlüler	Ünlüler	15th Voted Out; Day 109	59%	6
Efecan Dianzenza; 25, Londra	Gönüllüler	Gönüllüler	16th Voted Out; Day 116	53%	2
Yunus Günçe; 39, (Germany)	Ünlüler	Ünlüler	17th Voted Out; Day 123	32%	0
İbrahim Giydirir; 26, Istanbul	Gönüllüler	Gönüllüler	17th Voted Out; Day 130	50%	2
Nagihan Karadere; 32, Osmaniye	Ünlüler	Ünlüler	18th Voted Out	60%	7
Semih Öztürk; 24, Bursa	Gönüllüler	Ünlüler	19th Voted Out	43%	0
Damla Can; 27, İzmir	Gönüllüler	Gönüllüler	20th Voted Out; 2nd Runner-up	46%	4 (Symbol Winner)
Serkay Tütüncü; 24, İzmir	Gönüllüler	Gönüllüler	1st Runner-up	59%	0
Çağan Atakan Arslan; 26, Istanbul	Ünlüler	Ünlüler	Sole Survivor	60%	5

=== (Season 11): Ünlüler - Gönüllüler ===
Survivor Ünlüler Gönüllüler 2017 was the eleventh season of the show.

Contestant	Original Tribe	Merged Tribe	Finish	Performance	Final Symbols
Fulya Şahin; 26, Istanbul	Gönüllüler		1st Voted Out; Day 4	30%	0
Seda Demir; 34, Istanbul	Ünlüler		2nd Voted Out; Day 11	33%	0
Denisa Gültekin; 25, Istanbul	Gönüllüler		3rd Voted Out; Day 18	27%	0
Yiğit İzik; 32, İzmir	Gönüllüler		4th Voted Out; Day 25	39%	0
Eser West; 27, New York City	Gönüllüler		Ejected; Day 28	55%	0
Berna Öztürk; 33, Istanbul	Ünlüler		5th Voted Out; Day 32	46%	0
Sadin Bakır; 31, Gaziantep	Gönüllüler		6th Voted Out; Day 39	42%	0
Tarık Mengüç; 45, Istanbul	Ünlüler		7th Voted Out; Day 46	26%	0
Fatih Hürkan; 45, Samsun	Ünlüler		8th Voted Out; Day 53	25%	0
Sedat Kapurtu; 44, Istanbul	Ünlüler		9th Voted Out; Day 60	50%	1
Bulut Özdemiroğlu; 28, Istanbul	Gönüllüler		10th Voted Out; Day 68	33%	0
Erdi Ünver; 29, Istanbul	Gönüllüler		11th Voted Out; Day 74	24%	0
Pınar Saka; 31, Istanbul	Ünlüler		12th Voted Out; Day 88	56%	0
Şahika Ercümen; 32, Çanakkale	Ünlüler		13th Voted Out; Day 95	31%	0
Burçak Tuncer; 24, İzmir	Gönüllüler		14th Voted Out; Day 102	34%	0
Tuğçe Melis Demir; 23, İzmir	Gönüllüler		15th Voted Out; Day 109	35%	5
Anıl Karakurt; 36, Istanbul	Gönüllüler		16th Voted Out; Day 116	37%	0
Volkan Çetinkaya; 34, Ankara	Gönüllüler		17th Voted Out; Day 123	46%	3
Furkan Kızılay; 26, Istanbul	Ünlüler		18th Voted Out; Day 130	49%	3
Gökhan Gözükan; 34, Istanbul	Gönüllüler		19th Voted Out; Day 135	46%	0
Elif Şadoğlu; 25, Istanbul	Gönüllüler		20th Voted Out; Day 143	54%	2
Berna Keklikler; 28, Gelsenkirchen	Gönüllüler	Merged Tribe	21st Voted Out; Day 146	40%	0
Sabriye Şengül; 29, Trabzon	Ünlüler	Merged Tribe	22nd Voted Out; Day 148	36%	0
İlhan Mansız; 41, Kempten	Ünlüler	Merged Tribe	23rd Voted Out; Day 150	52%	7
Sema Apak; 31, Bursa	Ünlüler	Merged Tribe	Quarter-final; Day 151	66%	10 (Symbol Winner)
Serhat Akın; 36, Bretten	Ünlüler	Merged Tribe	Semi-final; Day 152	57%	1
Adem Kılıççı; 31, Ağrı	Ünlüler	Merged Tribe	Runner-up; Day 153	50%	0
Ogeday Girişken; 25, Istanbul	Gönüllüler	Merged Tribe	Sole Survivor; Day 153	58%	2

=== (Season 12): Ünlüler - Gönüllüler ===
This season was broadcast by TV8 and was presented by Acun Ilıcalı. Several former castaways claimed to have either declined the offer to return for All-Star or been cut from the cast versus new castaways that have joined the game for the first time.

Emre, İpek, Mustafa, Batuhan, Elif, Yiğit and Berna joined the game after 2 or 4 weeks. Some players were transferred to the other team: Hakan (day 1) – Ecem (day 5) – Nagihan (day 30) – Hilmi Cem (day 52) – Murat (day 52) – Damla (day 52) – Mustafa Kemal (day 52).

Contestant	Original Tribe	Switched Tribe	Twisted Tribe	Merged Tribe	Finish	Performance	Final Symbols
Gamze Firuze Aksu; 28, İzmir	Gönüllüler	Gönüllüler			Evacuated; Day 9	0.0%	0
Yiğit Marcus Aral; 29, Istanbul	Gönüllüler	Gönüllüler			1st Voted Out; Day 11	38.4%	0
Ecem Karaağaç; 27, Bursa	Gönüllüler	All Star			Evacuated; Day 18	25.0%	0
Gizem Kurtulan; 23, Bursa	Gönüllüler	Gönüllüler			2nd Voted Out; Day 18	33.3%	0
Emre Durak; 20, Adana	Gönüllüler	Gönüllüler			3rd Voted Out; Day 24	25.0%	0
Melih Özkaya; 30, Istanbul	Gönüllüler	Gönüllüler			Evacuated; Day 30	39.5%	0
Nihat Doğan; 41, Istanbul; Survivor: Ünlüler – Gönüllüler 1	All Star	All Star			4th Voted Out; Day 31	29.4%	0
Berrin İpek Yaşar; 27, Balaban	Gönüllüler	Gönüllüler			5th Voted Out; Day 38	13.7%	0
Ramazan Kalyoncu; 27, Rize	Gönüllüler	Gönüllüler			6th Voted Out; Day 45	45.5%	0
Batuhan Buğra Eruygur; 27, Istanbul	Gönüllüler	Gönüllüler			Retreated; Day 51	34.4%	0
Nevin Yanıt Baltacı; 32, Mersin	Gönüllüler	Gönüllüler			7th Voted Out; Day 52	38.7%	0
Funda Alkayış; 30, Mersin	Gönüllüler	Gönüllüler	Gönüllüler		8th Voted Out; Day 59	48.6%	0
Berna Canbeldek; 28, İzmir; Survivor: Ünlüler – Gönüllüler 4 Survivor: All-Star	All Star	All Star	Ünlüler		Evacuated; Day 65	45.0%	0
Cumali Akgül; 32, Iğdır	Gönüllüler	Gönüllüler	Gönüllüler		9th Voted Out; Day 66	35.2%	0
Sahra Işık; 27, Istanbul; Survivor: Ünlüler – Gönüllüler 4 Survivor: All-Star	All Star	All Star	Ünlüler		10th Voted Out; Day 73	46.9%	0
Yiğit Dikmen; 31, Istanbul; Survivor: Ünlüler – Gönüllüler 4	All Star	All Star	Ünlüler		11th Voted Out; Day 80	44.2%	0
Elif Şadoğlu; 26, Istanbul; Survivor: Ünlüler – Gönüllüler 6	All Star	All Star	Ünlüler		12th Voted Out; Day 87	41.7%	0
Birsen Bekgöz; 37, Berlin	Gönüllüler	Gönüllüler	Gönüllüler		13th Voted Out; Day 101	40.2%	0
Yağmur Banda; 20, İzmir	Gönüllüler	Gönüllüler	Gönüllüler		14th Voted Out; Day 108	37.0%	2
Ümit Karan; 41, Berlin; Survivor: Ünlüler – Gönüllüler 3	All Star	All Star	Ünlüler		15th Voted Out; Day 115	51.3%	1
Mustafa Kemal Kurt; 33, Istanbul	Gönüllüler	Gönüllüler	Ünlüler		16th Voted Out; Day 122	49.3%	0
Merve Aydın; 28, Istanbul; Survivor: Ünlüler – Gönüllüler 4 Survivor: All-Star	All Star	All Star	Ünlüler	Merged Tribe	17th Voted Out; Day 124	47.4%	1
Sema Aydemir; 33, Bursa; Survivor: Ünlüler – Gönüllüler 6	All Star	All Star	Ünlüler	Merged Tribe	18th Voted Out; Day 129	51.2%	1
Murat Ceylan; 29, Istanbul; Survivor: Ünlüler – Gönüllüler 3	All Star	All Star	Gönüllüler	Merged Tribe	19th Voted Out; Day 133	38.7%	0
Hakan Hatipoğlu; 38, Çanakkale; Survivor: Kızlar – Erkekler; Survivor: All-Star	All Star	Gönüllüler	Gönüllüler	Merged Tribe	20th Voted Out; Day 135	42.8%	0
Turabi Çamkıran; 30, Mersin; Survivor: Ünlüler – Gönüllüler 4 Survivor: All-Star	All Star	All Star	Ünlüler	Merged Tribe	Semi-final; Day 140	54.3%	3
Damla Can; 27, İzmir; Survivor: Ünlüler – Gönüllüler 5	All Star	All Star	Gönüllüler	Merged Tribe	Semi-final; Day 140	54.9%	4
Hilmi Cem İntepe; 26, Muğla; Survivor: Ünlüler – Gönüllüler 3 Survivor: All-Star	All Star	All Star	Gönüllüler	Merged Tribe	Runner-up; Day 141	53.3%	2
Anıl Berk Baki; 26, Istanbul	Gönüllüler	Gönüllüler	Gönüllüler	Merged Tribe	Runner-up; Day 141	54.3%	3
Nagihan Karadere; 34, Osmaniye; Survivor: Ünlüler – Gönüllüler 5	All Star	Gönüllüler	Gönüllüler	Merged Tribe	Runner-up; Day 141	62.0%	4
Adem Kılıççı; 32, Ağrı; Survivor: Ünlüler – Gönüllüler 6	All Star	All Star	Ünlüler	Merged Tribe	Sole Survivor; Day 141	58.0%	4 (Symbol Winner)

=== (Season 13): Türkiye - Yunanistan ===
The 2019 season was a joint production between Turkey and Greece. The Turkey and Greece tribes were later mixed on Day 60 of the competition.

List of Survivor Greece vs. Turkey 2019 contestants
Contestant	Original tribe	Second Tribe	Unification of the Islands	Finish
Dimitris Margaritis; 45, Athens	Greece			Evacuated; Day 3
Dimitra (Demi) Tsaganou; 27, Lamia	Greece			1st Voted Out; Day 4
Erdem Ekşioğlu; 25, Istanbul	Turkey			Evacuated; Day 7
Nadia Mavroudea; 27, Athens	Greece			Evacuated; Day 8
Kader Karakaya; 22, Osmangazi	Turkey			2nd Voted Out; Day 11
Ioulieta Kitrinou; 26, Chios	Greece			3rd Voted Out; Day 18
Azim Kaan Güvenilir; 29, Istanbul	Turkey			4th Voted Out; Day 25
Ecem Onaran; 29, İzmir	Turkey			5th Voted Out; Day 32
Vasilis Simos; 27, Athens	Greece			6th Voted Out; Day 39
Hakan Kanık; 19, Istanbul	Turkey			7th Voted Out; Day 46
Patrick Ogunsoto; 36, Lagos	Greece			8th Voted Out; Day 53
Vasilis Vasilikos; 28, Athens	Greece			9th Voted Out; Day 60
Melisa Emirbayer; 23, İzmir	Turkey	Black Team		10th Voted Out; Day 67
Tony Stavratis; 34, Salamina	Greece	White Team		11th Voted Out; Day 74
Elpida Meziridou; 28, Cyprus	Greece	Black Team		12th Out; Day 88
Sabriye Şengül; 31, Trabzon; Survivor: Ünlüler – Gönüllüler 6	Turkey	White Team		13th Voted Out; Day 95
Atakan Işıktutan; 24, Istanbul	Turkey	Black Team		14th Voted Out; Day 102
Ria Kolovou; 30, Edessa	Greece	White Team		15th Voted Out; Day 109
Hikmet Tuğsuz; 32, Antalya	Turkey	White Team		Evacuated; Day 113
Büşra Yalçın; 21, Istanbul	Turkey	White Team		16th Voted Out; Day 123
Spyros Gourdoupis; 28, Patras	Greece	Black Team		17th Voted Out; Day 132
Kyriakos Pelekanos; 39, Cyprus	Greece	White Team		18th Voted Out; Day 137
Sude Burcu; 23, İzmir	Turkey	Black Team		19th Voted Out; Day 139
Panagiotis Konstantinidis; 24, Athens	Greece	Black Team		20th Voted Out; Day 143
Bora Edin; 34, Istanbul	Turkey	White Team		21st Voted Out; Day 146
Emre Durak; 21, Adana; Survivor: Mix-Star	Turkey	Black Team	Unification of the Islands	Turkish; Quarter-final; Day 148
Afroditi Skafida; 36, Athens	Greece	White Team	Unification of the Islands	Greek; Semi-final; Day 148
Nikos Kosmas; 26, Athens	Greece	White Team	Unification of the Islands	Greek; Semi-final; Day 148
Okay Köksal; 31, Artvin	Turkey	White Team	Unification of the Islands	Turkish; Semi-final; Day 148
Dimitra Vamvakousi; 24, Athens	Greece	Black Team	Unification of the Islands	Greek; Runner-Up; Day 148
Katerina Dalaka; 26, Katerini; Survivor: Diasimoi – Machites 2	Greece	Black Team	Unification of the Islands	Greek; Sole Survivor; Day 148
Seda Ocak; 34, Bursa	Turkey	White Team	Unification of the Islands	Turkish; Runner-Up; Day 149
Yusuf Karakaya; 24, Elazığ	Turkey	Black Team	Unification of the Islands	Turkish; Sole Survivor; Day 149

=== (Season 14): Ünlüler - Gönüllüler ===
Survivor 2020 is a TV competition program that started on February 16, 2020, and made the final on July 14, 2020, presented by Acun Ilıcalı and Murat Ceylan. The program was shot in the Dominican Republic. The format of the competition is Survivor Celebrities - Volunteers.

==== Contestants ====
===== Ünlüler =====
- Uğur Pektaş
- Şaziye İvegin Üner
- Tuğba Melis Türk
- Erman Altıkardeş
- Derya Can Göçen
- İrem Akın
- Parviz Abdullayev
- Ezgi Hocaoğlu
- Aşkım Burçe Tunay
- Ersin Korkut
- Mert Öcal
- Aycan Yanaç
- Yunus Emre Özden
- Sercan Yıldırım (Sixth)
- Elif Yıldırım Gören (Fifth)

===== Gönüllüler =====
- Makbule Karabudak
- Fatma Günaydın
- İlayda Velibeyoğlu
- Tayfun Erdoğan
- Ceyhun Uzun
- Meryem Kasap
- Burak Yurdugör
- Gizem Birdan
- Sadık Ardahan Uzkanbaş
- Evrim Keklik (Eighth)
- Nisa Bölükbaşı (Seventh)
- Berkan Karabulut (Fourth)
- Yasin Obuz (Third)
- Barış Murat Yağcı (Second)
- Cemal Can Canseven (Champion)

==== Weekly teams ====
===== Red Team =====
	17th Week	18th Week	19th Week ^{5}	20th Week	21st Week
Captain	Sercan	Cemal Can	Elif	Sercan	Berkan
Elections	Elif	Berkan	Sercan	Elif	Barış
Elections	Berkan	Nisa	Berkan	Yasin	Elif
Elections	Yunus Emre	Barış	Evrim		
Elections	Barış				

===== Blue Team =====
	17th Week	18th Week	19th Week ^{6}	20th Week	21st Week
Captain	Cemal Can	Ardahan	Yasin	Cemal Can	Cemal Can
Elections	Nisa	Elif	Cemal Can	Berkan	Yasin
Elections	Yasin	Sercan	Barış	Nisa	Sercan
Elections	Ardahan	Yasin	Nisa	Barış	
Elections	Evrim	Evrim			

==== Elimination history ====
Contestants	Original Team	Second Team	17th Week	18th Week	19th Week	20th Week	21st Week	Unification Of The Islands	Finish
Uğur Pektaş; 40, Istanbul	Celebrities								Injury; Day 3
Şaziye İvegin Üner; 38, Adana	Celebrities								Injury; Day 3
Makbule Karabudak; 27, Istanbul	Volunteers								1st Elimination; Day 3
Tuğba Melis Türk; 29, Sofya	Celebrities								2nd Elimination; Day 10
Erman Altıkardeş; 24, İzmir	Celebrities								Disqualification; Day 15
Fatma Günaydın; 25, Erzurum	Volunteers								Injury; Day 15
Derya Can Göçen; 40, Canakkale	Celebrities								3rd Elimination; Day 17
İrem Akın; 21, Tekirdağ	Celebrities								4th Elimination; Day 24
İlayda Velibeyoğlu; 21, Frankfurt	Volunteers								Withdrawal From The Competition; Day 31
Tayfun Erdoğan; 28, Bursa	Volunteers								5th Elimination; Day 31
Ceyhun Uzun; 51, Istanbul	Volunteers								6th Elimination; Day 38
Meryem Kasap; 28, Trabzon	Volunteers								Injury; Day 41
Burak Yurdugör; 21, Istanbul	Volunteers								7th Elimination; Day 45
Parviz Abdullayev; 34, Aghdam	Celebrities								8th Elimination; Day 52
Ezgi Hocaoğlu; 25, Istanbul	Celebrities								9th Elimination; Day 66
Gizem Birdan; 28, Istanbul	Volunteers								10th Elimination; Day 73
Aşkım Burçe Tunay; 20, Istanbul	Celebrities								11th Elimination; Day 80
Ersin Korkut; 42, Hakkâri	Celebrities								Injury; Day 87
Mert Öcal; 37, Istanbul	Celebrities								12th Elimination; Day 94
Aycan Yanaç; 21, Nurnberg	Celebrities							Unification Of The Islands	13th Elimination; Day 108
Yunus Emre Özden; 26, Istanbul	Volunteers	Celebrities	Red Team					Unification Of The Islands	14th Elimination; Day 115
Sadık Ardahan Uzkanbaş; 33, Adana	Volunteers		Blue Team	Blue Team				Unification Of The Islands	15th Elimination; Day 122
Evrim Keklik; 29, Istanbul	Volunteers		Blue Team	Blue Team	Red Team			Unification Of The Islands	"Quarter Final"; 16th Elimination; Day 129
Nisa Bölükbaşı; 21, Prag	Volunteers		Blue Team	Red Team	Blue Team	Blue Team		Unification Of The Islands	"Quarter Final"; 17th Elimination; Day 136
Sercan Yıldırım; 30, Bursa	Celebrities		Red Team	Blue Team	Red Team	Red Team	Blue Team	Unification Of The Islands	"Quarter Final"; 18th Elimination; Day 143
Elif Yıldırım Gören; 30, Bursa	Celebrities		Red Team	Blue Team	Red Team	Red Team	Red Team	Unification Of The Islands	"Quarter Final"; 19th Elimination; Day 145
Berkan Karabulut; 26, Istanbul	Celebrities	Volunteers	Red Team	Red Team	Red Team	Blue Team	Red Team	Unification Of The Islands	"Quarter Final"; 20th Elimination; Day 148
Yasin Obuz; 32, Diyarbakir	Volunteers		Blue Team	Blue Team	Blue Team	Red Team	Blue Team	Unification Of The Islands	Semi Final; Day 149
Barış Murat Yağcı; 29, İzmir	Celebrities	Volunteers	Red Team	Red Team	Blue Team	Blue Team	Red Team	Unification Of The Islands	"Grand Finale"; Grand Finalist; Day 150
Cemal Can Canseven; 25, İzmir	Volunteers		Blue Team	Red Team	Blue Team	Blue Team	Blue Team	Unification Of The Islands	Champion; Day 150

=== Survivor Exxen Cup ===
Survivor Exxen Cup was a spin-off of Survivor. It was broadcast at Exxen in 2021. It was presented by Murat Ceylan. Seda Ocak, Sema Aydemir, Sercan Yıldırım, Elif Yıldırım Gören, Hakan Hatipoğlu, Cağan Atakan Arslan, Nagihan Karadere, Birsen Bekgöz, Yusuf Karakaya, Berkan Karabulut, Sahra Işık and Anil Berk Baki participated in Survivor Exxen Cup. Anıl Berk Baki became champion in the men's category, after defeating Berkan Karabulut in the final. Sema Aydemir became champion in the women's category having defeated her rival Nagihan Karadere in the final.

=== (Season 15): 2021 Survivor: Ünlüler - Gönüllüler ===
Survivor 2021 is a TV competition program that started on January 9, 2021, and made the final on June 25, 2021, presented by Acun Ilıcalı and Murat Ceylan. The program was shot in the Dominican Republic. The format of the competition is Survivor Celebrities - Volunteers.

=== (Season 16): 2022 Survivor: All Star ===
Survivor 2022 All Star was a TV competition program that started on January 15, 2022. It was presented by Acun Ilıcalı and Murat Ceylan. The program was shot in the Dominican Republic. The format of the competition is Survivor Celebrities - Volunteers, who were former contestants.

=== (Season 17): 2023 Survivor: Ünlüler - Gönüllüler ===
Survivor 2023 was a TV competition program that started on January 15, 2023. It was presented by Acun Ilıcalı and Murat Ceylan. The format of the competition is Survivor Celebrities - Volunteers.

=== (Season 18): 2024 Survivor All Star ===
Survivor 2024 All Star' is a TV competition program that started on January 1, 2024. It is presented by Acun Ilıcalı and Turabi. The format of the competition is Survivor All Star Champion Ogeday Girisken

=== (Season 19): 2025 Survivor: All Star - Gönüllüler ===
Survivor 2025 was a TV competition program that started on January 1, 2025. It was presented by Acun Ilıcalı and Murat Ceylan. The program was shot in the Dominican Republic. The format of the competition is Survivor All Star - Volunteers.
