= Which Way to the Stage =

2022 play by Ana Nogueira

- Original language: English
- Written by: Ana Nogueira
- Genre: Comedy

Premiere
- Date: 10 May 2022
- Place: MCC Theater

Which Way to the Stage is a 2022 play by Ana Nogueira. The play follows Jeff and Judy, on their experiences while waiting outside the stage door for Idina Menzel in the original Broadway production of If/Then. It was originally titled Here She Is, Boys.

== Synopsis ==
At the Richard Rodgers Theatre in New York City, Judy and Jeff wait outside the stage door during a performance of If/Then, hoping to meet Idina Menzel. She didn't come out the day they saw the show, and its closing has been announced. Both of them are aspiring actors. Judy has recently begun auditioning again after establishing a career in real estate, while Jeff works as a drag queen. Jeff admonishes Judy for using the word "faggot" to insult Jeff's ex-boyfriend, and Judy is surprised that he has taken offense given her allyship bona fides. It then starts to rain and they assume Menzel will not come out.

Judy attends a callback for the roles of Kate Monster and Lucy the Slut in a production of Avenue Q to be staged in Maine. An actor, Mark, flirts with Judy and another actress, giving them both his phone number. Judy is intimidated by the other actress, who is voluptuous and conventionally beautiful, but that actress hears Judy sing and is likewise intimidated.

At the stage door that night, Judy tells Jeff she didn't get the part, and is offended when Jeff offers advice about femininity. Mark arrives, Judy having told him where she'd be. He booked the role of Princeton in Avenue Q. Mark, who has an Ivy League business degree, describes how he left his job in finance to pursue acting. Jeff has developed a new drag act based on Menzel, and Judy and Mark decide to attend as their first date. They learn that Menzel's understudy is performing in her place that night.

At the drag club, Judy and Mark enjoy each other's company. They nearly kiss, but Judy pulls away as Jeff's performance starts. A drunken bachelorette interrupts the show, and Judy is troubled when Jeff shuts down the heckler by insulting her vagina. The performance continues, but Judy soon leaves, telling Mark she doesn't feel well. After the show, Mark stays to talk to Jeff after the patrons have all left. Jeff tells Mark that Judy's voice is incredible, but she always restrains herself to her detriment. Mark kisses Jeff, who physically pushes Mark away out of respect for Judy.

At a callback for Spamalot, Judy sees the same actress again and smiles privately on learning that Mark never called her back. The actress is surprised Judy didn't book Avenue Q, but reveals the director sexually harassed her when they worked together before. She praises Judy's voice and encourages her to perform enthusiastically.

At the stage door, the tension between Judy and Jeff comes to a head. She tells him that his performance was misogynistic and appropriative of femininity, and would have offended Menzel. He argues that none of the great musical theatre roles are for men; rather, they were written by gay men who created female characters because they couldn't express their authentic selves. He tells her that Mark kissed him, and she admits that she felt too insecure to let Mark kiss her. Judy storms off and Jeff leaves in tears.

Jeff and Mark see each other at a callback. Jeff has been ignoring Mark's texts, but after Jeff reveals he and Judy are no longer friends and Mark unreservedly expresses his romantic interest in Jeff, they kiss passionately and agree to date. But on learning that Mark dropped out of Avenue Q because he didn't want to leave the comfort of his life in New York and thinks he can get other roles easily, Jeff decides that Mark is unserious in pursuing theatre and does not authentically share his values. Jeff tells Mark not to come back to the stage door.

Some time later, Judy has reached out to Jeff after a period of noncontact, to ask for a slot in his show. She gives a bravura drag performance of "Rose's Turn."

== Productions ==
Which Way to the Stage had its premiere at Newman Mills Theater in The Robert W. Wilson MCC Theater Space on May 10 2022, following previews from April 14. The play was initially scheduled to play a limited run to May 22, but extended to June 5 due to Covid-19 related cancellations. Directed by Mike Donahue, the cast included Sas Goldberg, Max Jenkins, Evan Todd, and Michelle Veintimilla.

The play ran at Signature Theatre in Arlington, Virginia, from December 6, 2022 to January 22, 2023.

== Cast and characters ==
Character	Off-Broadway (2022)	Arlington, VA (2022-23)
Judy	Sas Goldberg	Dani Stoller
Jeff	Max Jenkins	Mike Millan
Mark	Evan Todd	Michael Tacconi
Actress/Bachelorette/Casting Director	Michelle Veintimilla	Nina-Sophia Pacheco
