= Ana Nogueira =

American actress and playwright

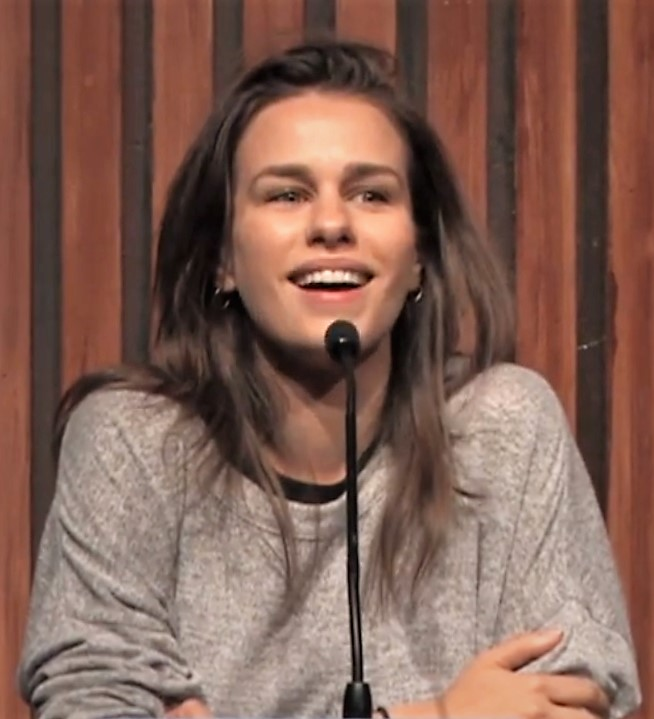
- Nogueira at the 2019 Pacific Playwrights Festival
- Born: 1985 or 1986 (age 39–40)
- Education: Boston Conservatory (BFA)
- Occupations: Actress, playwright
- Years active: 2007–present
- Spouse: Nick Blaemire
- Children: 1

Ana Nogueira (born 1985 or 1986) is an American actress, playwright, and screenwriter.

== Early life ==
Nogueira was born in the United States to a Brazilian father and American mother. Nogueira grew up in East Falls, Philadelphia, and attended Friends' Central School. She earned a Bachelor of Fine Arts in Theatre from the Boston Conservatory at Berklee in 2007.

== Career ==
Nogueira is known for playing Sarah in Sarah + Dee and Penny Ares in The Vampire Diaries. She originated the role of Eliza Hamilton in the original Vassar workshop production of Lin-Manuel Miranda's stage musical Hamilton.

She has written the plays Empathitrax and Which Way to the Stage.

She is collaborating with James Gunn on his DC Universe, screenwriting several films including Supergirl (2026), an untitled Teen Titans film, and an untitled Wonder Woman film.

== Personal life ==
Nogueira is married to actor and writer Nick Blaemire. In September 2022, she gave birth to a daughter.

== Filmography ==
=== Writer ===
Theatre

- Empathitrax (2016)
- Which Way to the Stage (2022)

Short film

- We Win (2018)

Feature film

- Supergirl (2026)

=== Actress ===
Short film

Year	Title	Role	Ref.
2007	Sarah + Dee	Sarah	
2018	We Win	Rachel	

Feature film

Year	Title	Role	Ref.
2017	Never Here	Karin	

Television

Year	Title	Role	Notes	Ref.
2008–2009, 2015	The Battery's Down	Molly Black	10 episodes	
2012	El Jefe	Maria Rodriguez	Television film	
2012	Baby Daddy	Chloe	1 episode	
2013	Blue Bloods	Nona Palmeira	2 episodes	
2013–2014	The Michael J. Fox Show	Kay Costa	13 episodes	
2014	My Day	Shayna		
2016	The Vampire Diaries	Penny Ares	5 episodes	
2017	The Blacklist	Lena Mercer	4 episodes	
2020–2024	Hightown	Donna	15 episodes	
