= Tommy Bracco =

American actor (born 1990)

- Bracco in 2026
- Born: Thomas Bracco; August 8, 1990 (age 36); New York City, New York, U.S.
- Occupations: Actor; television personality
- Television: Big Brother 21
- Spouse: Joey Macli (m. 2025)

Thomas Bracco (born August 8, 1990) is an American actor, reality television star and Broadway performer. He is best known for starring in Newsies as Spot Conlon on Broadway. He was a cast member on season 21 of Big Brother and placed 5th in the competition.

== Early life ==
Thomas Bracco was born and raised in Huguenot, Staten Island to Phil and Annabelle Bracco. He attended Fiorello H. LaGuardia High School for the Performing Arts. Bracco took acting classes at Chazz Palminteri and dance classes at Star Struck Dance Studio. He was trained at Dale Brown Musical Theatre Intensive.

== Career ==
=== Broadway ===
He began his acting debut in the Broadway musical Newsies playing the character Spot Conlon. The Musical premiered at the Paper Mill Playhouse in Millburn, New Jersey and ran from September 25, 2011, through October 16, 2011. It opened again on Broadway at the Nederlander Theatre and ran from March 15, 2012, to August 24, 2014. He reprised his role on Broadway performing in Pretty Woman: The Musical as Giulio. The musical made its world premiere at the Nederlander Theatre in Chicago, Illinois on March 13, 2018. It then made its way onto Broadway on July 20, 2018, and closed on August 18, 2019.

=== Film and television ===
Bracco made TV appearances in shows like Submissions Only and The Battery's Down. He made his film debut in a movie called 4th Man Out playing the character Giovanni. He also had a role as a tango dancer in the movie Isn't It Romantic. In 2022, Bracco competed on The Challenge: Ride or Dies with Big Brother 21 houseguest Analyse Talavera as his partner.

==== Big Brother ====
Bracco entered the house knowing another houseguest Christie Murphy. It was revealed that Murphy had been in a seven-year relationship with one of Bracco's relatives, and that they were not entering the house aware of the fact that they'd be competing together. Murphy won HoH week one keeping Bracco safe from eviction. He quickly formed an eight-person alliance with seven other houseguests called "Gr8ful".

In Week 7, right after Jack's eviction, Tommy won Head of Household. On Day 52, he nominated Cliff and Kathryn for eviction alongside his ally, Christie, who was a special third nominee due to the America's Field Trip twist. Tommy also won the Week 7 Power of Veto competition and used it to remove Christie from the block. He was not required to name a replacement nominee.

Tommy won the Power of Veto (for the second time) in Week 10 and on Day 76, used the power of Veto on Christie. On Day 79, he was nominated by Nicole in the double eviction alongside Christie, but survived to remain in the house when Christie was evicted by a 3–0 vote. He was eliminated 2–0 against Holly the following week on Jackson's HOH. After the double eviction, Michie won HOH, and placed Tommy and Cliff for eviction. Nicole won the Power of Veto and used it on Cliff, forcing Holly to be the replacement nominee. Tommy was evicted with a vote of 2–0, and Tommy being the seventh member of the jury. He voted for Michie to win.

== Personal life ==
In April 2025, Bracco married Joey Macli, with whom he had a five-year relationship and he was engaged since May 2023. Their wedding in New York City was attended by Bracco's Big Brother alumni, their own families and friends, and others.

== Filmography ==
Year	Title	Role	Notes
2012	Submissions Only	Dancer	Episode: "Another Interruption"
2015	4th Man Out	Giovanni	Film debut
2015	The Battery's Down	Gaggle of Gays	Episode: "Reunion"
2017	Newsies	Spot Conlon	
2019	Isn't It Romantic	Tango Dancer	Uncredited
2019	Big Brother 21	Himself/Contestant	5th Place
2022	The Challenge Ride or Dies	Himself/Contestant	Eliminated Episode 4
2025	99 to Beat	Himself/Contestant	Eliminated in semifinals; Finished in 11th place

== Stage ==
Year	Show	Role	Notes
2012–14	Newsies	Spot Conlon	Nederlander Theatre
2018–19	Pretty Woman: The Musical	Giulio	Nederlander Theatre
2024	The Heart of Rock and Roll	Ensemble	James Earl Jones Theatre
2024	Titanique	Victor Garber/Luigi	Daryl Roth Theater
