= Big Brother 21 (American season) =

Season of American reality television series

Big Brother
- Season 21
- Big Brother 21 title card
- Hosted by: Julie Chen Moonves
- No. of days: 99
- No. of houseguests: 16
- Winner: Jackson Michie
- Runner-up: Holly Allen
- America's Favorite HouseGuest: Nicole Anthony
- Companion show: Big Brother: After Dark
- No. of episodes: 40

Release
- Original network: CBS
- Original release: June 25 – September 25, 2019

Additional information
- Filming dates: June 19 – September 25, 2019

Season chronology
- ← Previous; Season 20 Next → Season 22

Big Brother 21 is the twenty-first season of the American version of the television reality program Big Brother. The season featured a summer camp theme. It premiered on June 25, 2019 and concluded on September 25, 2019. The 40-episode season was broadcast on CBS in the United States and Global in Canada. The show chronicles a group of contestants, known as HouseGuests, as they compete to be the last competitor remaining to win a grand prize of $500,000.

Over the course of the season, the HouseGuests participated in a series of competitions to win power and safety to avoid being eliminated, referred to as "evicted". In the finale episode, previous nine evicted HouseGuests, known as the Jury, voted on who they thought should win the game out of the last two HouseGuests remaining. The HouseGuest who received the most votes would be declared the winner. Prior to the live finale, a public vote is held to determine who would win the title America's Favorite HouseGuest and a prize of $25,000. Jackson Michie was declared the winner of the season in a 6–3 jury vote over Holly Allen while Nicole Anthony won the public vote for America's Favorite HouseGuest.

Despite receiving negative reviews from fans and critics, on September 5, 2019, CBS confirmed that the series was renewed for a twenty-second season.

== Format ==
Big Brother follows a group of contestants, known as HouseGuests, who live inside a custom-built house outfitted with cameras and microphones recording their every move 24 hours a day. The HouseGuests are sequestered with no contact with the outside world. During their stay, the HouseGuests share their thoughts on their day-to-day lives inside the house in a private room known as the Diary Room. Each week, the HouseGuests compete in competitions to win power and safety inside the house. At the start of each week, the HouseGuests compete in a Head of Household (abbreviated as "HOH") competition. The winner of the HoH competition is immune from eviction and selects two HouseGuests to be nominated for eviction. Six HouseGuests are then selected to compete in the Power of Veto (abbreviated as "PoV") competition: the reigning HoH, the nominees, and three other HouseGuests chosen by random draw. The winner of the PoV competition has the right to either revoke the nomination of one of the nominated HouseGuests or leave them as is. If the veto winner uses this power, the HoH must immediately nominate another HouseGuest for eviction. The PoV winner is also immune from being named as the replacement nominee. On eviction night, all HouseGuests vote to evict one of the nominees, though the Head of Household and the nominees are not allowed to vote. This vote is conducted in the privacy of the Diary Room. In the event of a tie, the Head of Household casts the tie-breaking vote. The nominee with the most votes is evicted from the house. The last nine evicted HouseGuests comprise the Jury and are sequestered in a separate location following their eviction and ultimately decide the winner of the season. The Jury is only allowed to see the competitions and ceremonies that include all of the remaining HouseGuests; they are not shown any interviews or other footage that might include strategy or details regarding nominations. The viewing public is able to award an additional prize of $25,000 by choosing "America's Favorite HouseGuest". All evicted HouseGuests are eligible to win this award except for those who either voluntarily leave or are forcibly removed for rule violations.

=== Format changes and additions ===
Over the course of the game, several changes to the format were introduced.

==== Camp Director ====
On the first premiere night, Julie announced that the HouseGuests would vote for a Camp Director. That person would be safe from the first eviction as well, but they had to select four HouseGuests to "banish". Those four HouseGuests would then compete to stay in house. The three winners would go back into the house while the loser stayed banished and did not return. Michie was elected Camp Director and banished Cliff, David, Jessica, and Kemi. David lost the competition and was evicted.

==== Whacktivity Competition ====
On the second premiere night, Julie announced the Whacktivity Competition where a game-changing twist would be unleashed onto the house. Every week for the first three weeks, five designated HouseGuests, unless previously evicted (denoted with ~~strikethrough text~~), would play in the competition to win a special power in the house.

Week	Theme	Players (winner in green)	Whacktivity Power		
Week	Theme	Players (winner in green)	Name	Description	Outcome
1	Nightmare	Cliff	Nightmare Power	During the night, Ovi can secretly wake up the house and call a new Nomination Ceremony, with the Head of Household naming two new nominees. The original nominees would have immunity for the week. The power is able to be used for the first six Nominations.	Not used (Evicted)
1	Nightmare	Isabella	Nightmare Power	During the night, Ovi can secretly wake up the house and call a new Nomination Ceremony, with the Head of Household naming two new nominees. The original nominees would have immunity for the week. The power is able to be used for the first six Nominations.	Not used (Evicted)
1	Nightmare	Kathryn	Nightmare Power	During the night, Ovi can secretly wake up the house and call a new Nomination Ceremony, with the Head of Household naming two new nominees. The original nominees would have immunity for the week. The power is able to be used for the first six Nominations.	Not used (Evicted)
1	Nightmare	Nicole	Nightmare Power	During the night, Ovi can secretly wake up the house and call a new Nomination Ceremony, with the Head of Household naming two new nominees. The original nominees would have immunity for the week. The power is able to be used for the first six Nominations.	Not used (Evicted)
1	Nightmare	Ovi	Nightmare Power	During the night, Ovi can secretly wake up the house and call a new Nomination Ceremony, with the Head of Household naming two new nominees. The original nominees would have immunity for the week. The power is able to be used for the first six Nominations.	Not used (Evicted)
2	Chaos	Holly	Chaos Power	After chips have been drawn for a Veto player draw, Jack can force a re-draw for the players. This power can only be used once and is able to be used until there are six players left in the game.	Used in Week 4; ~~Holly, Jessica, Sam~~ ↓ Analyse, Kathryn, Sam
2	Chaos	Jack	Chaos Power	After chips have been drawn for a Veto player draw, Jack can force a re-draw for the players. This power can only be used once and is able to be used until there are six players left in the game.	Used in Week 4; ~~Holly, Jessica, Sam~~ ↓ Analyse, Kathryn, Sam
2	Chaos	Michie	Chaos Power	After chips have been drawn for a Veto player draw, Jack can force a re-draw for the players. This power can only be used once and is able to be used until there are six players left in the game.	Used in Week 4; ~~Holly, Jessica, Sam~~ ↓ Analyse, Kathryn, Sam
2	Chaos	Sam	Chaos Power	After chips have been drawn for a Veto player draw, Jack can force a re-draw for the players. This power can only be used once and is able to be used until there are six players left in the game.	Used in Week 4; ~~Holly, Jessica, Sam~~ ↓ Analyse, Kathryn, Sam
2	Chaos	Tommy	Chaos Power	After chips have been drawn for a Veto player draw, Jack can force a re-draw for the players. This power can only be used once and is able to be used until there are six players left in the game.	Used in Week 4; ~~Holly, Jessica, Sam~~ ↓ Analyse, Kathryn, Sam
3	Panic	Analyse	Panic Power	At any of the next four Power of Veto Ceremonies, Christie can turn the Golden Power of Veto into a Diamond Power of Veto, which will allow its holder to pull someone off the nomination block and then, instead of the Head of Household naming the replacement nominee, the Veto holder names the replacement.	Not used (Expired)
3	Panic	Christie	Panic Power	At any of the next four Power of Veto Ceremonies, Christie can turn the Golden Power of Veto into a Diamond Power of Veto, which will allow its holder to pull someone off the nomination block and then, instead of the Head of Household naming the replacement nominee, the Veto holder names the replacement.	Not used (Expired)
3	Panic	Jessica	Panic Power	At any of the next four Power of Veto Ceremonies, Christie can turn the Golden Power of Veto into a Diamond Power of Veto, which will allow its holder to pull someone off the nomination block and then, instead of the Head of Household naming the replacement nominee, the Veto holder names the replacement.	Not used (Expired)
3	Panic	~~Kemi~~	Panic Power	At any of the next four Power of Veto Ceremonies, Christie can turn the Golden Power of Veto into a Diamond Power of Veto, which will allow its holder to pull someone off the nomination block and then, instead of the Head of Household naming the replacement nominee, the Veto holder names the replacement.	Not used (Expired)
3	Panic	Nick	Panic Power	At any of the next four Power of Veto Ceremonies, Christie can turn the Golden Power of Veto into a Diamond Power of Veto, which will allow its holder to pull someone off the nomination block and then, instead of the Head of Household naming the replacement nominee, the Veto holder names the replacement.	Not used (Expired)

==== Camp Comeback ====
During the first live eviction show, Julie announced to the audience that the first person voted out of the game would not go anywhere. After revealing Ovi's eviction, the HouseGuests were told that the evicted HouseGuest would not leave the house as normal, but live inside the house as part of Camp Comeback. At this time, David returned to the house. One of the first four HouseGuests to be eliminated would win their way back into the game. The evicted HouseGuests would not compete in competitions or ceremonies and would sleep in a special bedroom. The four HouseGuests, David, Ovi, Kemi, and Cliff, competed immediately after Cliff's eviction on Day 30. Cliff won and made his way back into the game, while David, Ovi, and Kemi were forced to immediately leave the house for good.

This twist also postponed Have-Nots as the Have-Not room was being used by the HouseGuests in Camp Comeback.

==== America's Field Trip ====
A twist called America's Field Trip was teased at the end of the July 25, 2019 eviction episode. On the August 1, 2019 eviction episode, it was revealed that America would vote for three HouseGuests who would compete against one another, with the winner being given immunity for the week, the runner-up being given a punishment and the loser being a third nominee. Should this third nominee be vetoed, no replacement nominee would be named, with only the HoH's two nominees facing the eviction vote. Voting for America's Field Trip opened shortly after the twist was revealed on the August 1, 2019. Voting closed on August 9, 2019, with the competition taking place shortly after. That same day, Analyse, Christie and Michie were voted in to compete in the competition. Michie won, meaning he was immune from eviction for that week. Analyse was the runner-up and received a punishment. Christie lost and was nominated as the third nominee.

==== Prank Week ====
During the eviction episode on August 23, it was revealed that Prank Week would take place during Week 9 in the House.

America's Prankster

The main feature of the week was America's Prankster twist. The HouseGuest voted as "America's Prankster" anonymously nominated one HouseGuest for eviction at the Nomination Ceremony, leaving the Head of Household with only one nomination. If their nominee is taken off the block by the Power of Veto, they will also anonymously name the replacement during the Veto Meeting. Holly, as Head of Household, was not eligible to be voted for America's Prankster. Voting opened for America's Prankster on August 22, 2019 at 6:30 pm PT (9:30 pm ET) and closed on August 23, 2019 at 9:00 am PT (12:00 pm ET). Nick won and, on Day 66, nominated Christie.

Other Pranks

Big Brother also played various pranks on the HouseGuests and the viewers during the week that did not affect the game. The pranks of Prank Week included:

- BB Birdwatching Tour: Big Brother made the HouseGuests stay up during the night with the "Big Brother Birdwatching Audio Tour" – which featured bird sounds and the names of birds. Big Brother intended to prank them by making the HouseGuests believe that the Audio Tour would be the subject matter for the next Head of Household competition and they would stay awake to remember the Audio Tour. It wasn't until the live Head of Household competition when the HouseGuests were told that the competition would not involve the bird sounds.
- Pie punishment: Cliff, Jessica, and Nicole got the lowest scores in the Head of Household competition and received a punishment. Periodically throughout the day or night, Big Brother would call Cliff, Jessica, and Nicole to make a pie and throw it in the face of either themselves or another HouseGuest.
- Interrupted sleep: Whether it be for the pie punishment or just to mess with the HouseGuests, Big Brother would wake HouseGuests in the middle of the night.
- Opening sequence: At the beginning of Wednesday's episode, the starting sequence showed videos and images from last season.
- Slimy Veto draw: At the Veto player draw, the box that held the HouseGuests' chips was full with slime, forcing Holly, Nick, and Christie to reach into the slime to pick the Veto players.
- Zingbot 9000: Zingbot – the robot programmed to roast HouseGuests – made his annual visit to the house to "zing" the Final 8 HouseGuests. He made his appearance on Day 67 for the Power of Veto competition.
- Clown spottings: Periodically on Day 69, Big Brother had clowns appear in the many windows around the House to scare the HouseGuests.

== HouseGuests ==
On June 10, 2019, CBS reported that the cast would be revealed on June 17, 2019 on Big Brother live feeds to viewers with a CBS All Access subscription. Jeff Schroeder returned to host pre-season interviews with the cast after being replaced by Celebrity Big Brother alumnus Ross Mathews for the previous season.

Name	Age	Occupation	Residence	Entry	Result
Jackson Michie	24	Server	Los Angeles, California	Day 1	Winner; Day 99
Holly Allen	31	Wine safari guide	Los Angeles, California	Day 1	Runner-up; Day 99
Nicole Anthony	24	Preschool aide	Long Island, New York	Day 1	Evicted; Day 99
Cliff Hogg III	53	Petroleum engineer	Houston, Texas	Day 30 (Note: Cliff won entry back into the game on Day 30.)	Evicted; Day 93
Cliff Hogg III	53	Petroleum engineer	Houston, Texas	Day 1	Evicted; Day 30
Tommy Bracco	28	Broadway dancer	Huguenot, New York	Day 1	Evicted; Day 86
Christie Murphy	28	Boutique owner	Keyport, New Jersey	Day 1	Evicted; Day 79
Jessica Milagros	37	Plus-size model	Oak Park, Illinois	Day 1	Evicted; Day 79
Nick Maccarone	27	Therapist	Sewell, New Jersey	Day 1	Evicted; Day 72
Analyse Talavera	22	College soccer star	Simi Valley, California	Day 1	Evicted; Day 65
Kathryn Dunn	29	Digital marketing executive	Dallas, Texas	Day 1	Evicted; Day 58
Jack Matthews	28	Fitness trainer	Tampa, Florida	Day 1	Evicted; Day 51
Sam Smith	31	Truck driver	Mountain Top, Pennsylvania	Day 1	Evicted; Day 44
Isabella Wang	22	Public health analyst	Los Angeles, California	Day 1	Evicted; Day 37
Olukemi "Kemi" Fakunle	25	Marketing strategist	Brooklyn, New York	Day 23	Exited (Note: Although Kemi was evicted on Day 23, she did not officially leave the Big Brother house until Day 30 due to the "Camp Comeback" twist.); Day 30
Olukemi "Kemi" Fakunle	25	Marketing strategist	Brooklyn, New York	Day 1	Evicted; Day 23
Ovi Kabir	22	College student	Knoxville, Tennessee	Day 15	Exited (Note: Although Ovi was evicted on Day 15, he did not officially leave the Big Brother house until Day 30 due to the "Camp Comeback" twist.); Day 30
Ovi Kabir	22	College student	Knoxville, Tennessee	Day 1	Evicted; Day 15
David Alexander	29	Photographer	Atlanta, Georgia	Day 15	Exited (Note: Although David was evicted on Day 1, he later re-entered on Day 15 and remained in the Big Brother house until Day 30 due to the "Camp Comeback" twist.); Day 30
David Alexander	29	Photographer	Atlanta, Georgia	Day 1	Evicted; Day 1

=== Future appearances ===
A month after the season ended, Jessica Milagros appeared on The Bold and the Beautiful. In 2020, David Alexander and Nicole Anthony returned as contestants for Big Brother: All-Stars. In 2022, Kathryn Dunn appeared on the fifth season of Ex on the Beach. Later that year, David Alexander competed on the first season of The Challenge: USA. Also in 2022, Analyse Talavera and Tommy Bracco competed on The Challenge: Ride or Dies as a team.

In 2025, Kat Dunn competed on The Amazing Race 38 partnered with her boyfriend. That same year, Tommy Bracco competed with his father, Phil, on the first season of 99 to Beat. In 2026, Alexander competed on the fifth season of The Floor.

== Episodes ==
No. overall	No. in season	Title	Day(s)	Original release date	U.S. viewers (millions)	Rating/share (18–49)
Week 1
707	1	"Episode 1"	Day 1	June 25, 2019	4.93	1.3/7
On Day 1, 16 new HouseGuests moved into the newly designed Big Brother house for up to 99 days and a chance to win the grand prize of $500,000. Following the move-in, the HouseGuests joined each other in the living room for formal introductions over champagne. As the HouseGuests began to settle in to the House, Julie informed them that they would vote for a Camp Director, who would be safe from the first eviction and have unprecedented power in the game. Some HouseGuests campaigned for Camp Director while others did not wish to have the role. In the backyard, each HouseGuest voted for who they thought should be the Camp Director. Michie won with ten votes. Julie then informed Michie that he would be forced to banish four people from the game. The four banished people would then compete against each other head-to-head with three of the four re-entering the game while the fourth would remain banished and be eliminated from the game.
708	2	"Episode 2"	Days 1–2	June 26, 2019	4.52	1.1/6
Michie begins planning on who he should banish from the house. Michie chooses to banish Cliff, Kemi, Jessica and David from the game. The banished HouseGuests are escorted to the backyard where they begin their competition.: Banishment Competition ("The Search for Camp B.B."): In the dark, the competing HouseGuests must find their way through the forest back to Camp B.B. Along the way there are fake camps such as "Camp Bee Bee" or "Camp B-Ball." The first three HouseGuests to arrive back at the House are allowed re-entry to the game while the fourth will remained banished from the game. Cliff was the first to return to Camp B.B., followed by Kemi and Jessica and were allowed re-entry to the game. David, remained banished from the game. The HouseGuests participated in the first Head of Household competition.; Head of Household ("Color Wars"): The competition was played in pairs. As Camp Director, Michie did not participate and was allowed to choose the pairs. Each pair had to hang onto a log suspended in the sky. If someone falls off their log, they were eliminated. The HouseGuest who remained on their log the longest became the HoH. Christie won.
709	3	"Episode 3"	Days 2–8	June 30, 2019	4.32	1.0/6
Speculation begins on who Christie will put up on the block. Meanwhile, alliances begin to form making other HouseGuests suspicious.: Whacktivity Competition ("Nightmare Comp: This Stinks"): HouseGuests are informed that over the next three weeks everyone will compete in a Whacktivity. Only five people will compete each week. The winner of each week will receive a power. The competing HouseGuests must smell the three trashcans in front of them as well as other items and try to match the smell in their trashcans. Once they think they've identified the smell they must hang the identifier from the can and must buzz in once all three cans are labeled. The first HouseGuest to correctly identify all three items will win. Cliff, Isabella, Kathryn, Nicole and Ovi competed in the first week. At the end of the third round, Ovi correctly identified all three smells and won the competition. The power Ovi received allows Ovi to make the current HoH rename their nominees for the week in the middle of the night once all others are asleep. The original nominees for the week are safe and cannot be nominated again. On Day 8, Cliff and Kathryn were nominated for eviction by Christie.
710	4	"Episode 4"	Days 8–12	July 2, 2019	4.46	1.1/6
Ahead of the Power of Veto, the HouseGuests picked players for the competition. Christie, Cliff and Kathryn, along with Sam, Jack and Nicole, participated, with Big Brother 20 winner Kaycee Clark returning to host.: Power of Veto ("Food Fight"): This competition was played by HouseGuests one at a time, inside the Camp B.B. Mess Hall, where the competing HouseGuest must attempt to catch as much food as they can as it falls from the sky. The more food caught, the more points HouseGuests received. The HouseGuest with the most points at the end of the competition won the PoV. Sam won with 21 points, then began debating on whether he should use the PoV, meanwhile, Christie begins thinking of a potential replacement nominee if the veto is used. Sam used the Power of Veto to remove Cliff from the block, forcing Christie to nominate Ovi as a replacement.
711	5	"Episode 5"	Days 12–15	July 3, 2019	4.25	1.1/7
HouseGuests begin discussing final nominations and deciding who they want to evict. They then participated in the live vote and eviction by voting on who they wished to evict from the house. On Day 15, by a unanimous 12–0 vote, Ovi was the first to be evicted. Julie informed the HouseGuests that Ovi had been evicted from the house and the "Camp Comeback" twist was unleashed. The twist allows the evicted HouseGuests to remain inside the house where they live upstairs in a special room. They will continue to live inside but not participate in competitions or evictions. Once four HouseGuests are in Camp Comeback, they will compete against each other for a chance to re-enter the game. David then re-entered the house.: Head of Household ("BB Fireworks Quiztacular"): The HouseGuests watched a fireworks display. Julie then asked a question to which the correct answer is either red, white or blue. If a HouseGuest answers correctly they move on, if a question is answered incorrectly, they will be eliminated from the competition. The last HouseGuest in the competition will become the next HoH. Jack won and became the second Head of Household of the season.
Week 2
712	6	"Episode 6"	Days 15–17	July 7, 2019	4.32	1.0/5
The HouseGuests begin to make new plans with the Camp Comeback twist unleashed into the house.: Whacktivity Competition ("Chaos Comp: For Goodness Snakes"): In this competition the competing HouseGuests are placed in a room full of snakes. On a table there are tanks with three other snakes. The HouseGuest must find a match in the room for the snakes in the tanks. Once they think they have found a match for each of the snakes they must buzz in. If correct, they are finished; if incorrect, they must continue trying. The HouseGuest who matches all three snakes in the shortest time wins. Jack won with a time of 40 seconds. Jack received the power which allows him to force a re-draw on players for the Power of Veto competition. The HouseGuests then saw a promotion for the new CBS series Love Island hosted by former Big Brother 20 HouseGuests Swaggy C, Bayleigh Dayton, Winston Hines and Brett Robinson. They were told that the winner of the next PoV competition would receive a trip to Fiji. Jack begins pondering nominations and has trouble deciding whom to put up. On Day 17, Jack nominated Jessica and Kemi for eviction.
713	7	"Episode 7"	Days 17–20	July 10, 2019	4.15	1.1/6
Ahead of the Power of Veto, the HouseGuests picked players for the competition. The Head of Household, Jack, Kemi and Jessica, along with Isabella, Michie and Sam, participated, with Big Brother 20 runner-up Tyler Crispen returning to host.: Power of Veto ("Froggy Style"): HouseGuests had to stack plastic frogs on a stand, but they could only do so if there was still water in their "aqua clock." If their water was running low, they had to refill it to have more time. After 30 minutes, they could not fill their aqua clocks anymore. After their aqua clock ran out, their score was the number of frogs that they stacked. The HouseGuest with the highest score won the Power of Veto and a five-day trip to Fiji. Sam won with 18 frogs and, on Day 20, decided to not use the Power of Veto, keeping Jack's nominations the same.
714	8	"Episode 8"	Days 20–23	July 11, 2019	4.05	1.0/6
Christie overheard Cliff talking about his new alliance, "The Fellowship of the Zing," with Ovi and Nicole and the four pairs in the house. She relayed this information to the dominant alliance, made up of the four pairs. The HouseGuests had decided to evict Kemi for the entire week, but after the Veto Ceremony, the HouseGuests became undecided after Kemi told Michie that Isabella was playing both sides of the house. On Day 23, by a 10–1 vote, with Michie casting the only vote for Jessica, Kemi was the second to be evicted and joined David and Ovi in Camp Comeback.: Head of Household ("Power Shot"): HouseGuests take turn throwing arrows underhand at a target with points. The HouseGuest whose arrow lands on the highest point ring wins the Head of Household; however, if someone does not want to be the HoH, then they could aim at two red dots at the top of the board, one earning them $5,000 and the other one earning them safety for the week. These dots could only be hit once and neither prize was claimed. Nick won with a score of 90.
Week 3
715	9	"Episode 9"	Days 23–24	July 14, 2019	4.20	1.0/6
The House begins to suspect who cast the rouge vote during the eviction process. Meanwhile, Nick begins debating on who to put up. Nick mentions that he's considering putting up Cliff and Jessica. Michie attempts to pin the rouge vote on Nicole but confides in Michie admitting who he actually voted for. Nick suspects Michie is up to something as he continues to bring up the vote with Nicole's name and suspects the vote could've been him.: Whacktivity Competition ("Panic Comp: Madagascar Mayhem"): HouseGuests had to search through Madagascar hissing cockroaches for rebus puzzles to solve a message: Don't meet Julie on eviction night. After figuring out a word, they had to grab letters off a board of letter combinations and spell the message. The HouseGuest to complete the message in the fastest time wins the Panic Power. Christie won with a time of 7:41. Nicole told Isabella and Nick that the Gr8ful alliance is targeting them; however, on Day 24, Cliff and Jessica were nominated for eviction by Nick.
716	10	"Episode 10"	Days 24–27	July 17, 2019	4.00	1.0/6
The dominant alliance, Gr8ful, along with Sam, met in the Head of Household room. Isabella told them the story Nicole told them about how the Gr8ful alliance, minus Isabella and Nick, were targeting her and Nick, as well as calling them bullies. The others, getting caught in the lie, started getting furious and made Isabella and Nick change their minds and completely gun after Nicole to get her out this week. The eight, along with Sam, start a new alliance called Unde9able.: Power of Veto ("The Haunting of Kaitlyn Herman"): Former Big Brother 20 Kaitlyn Herman returned to host the competition. HouseGuests had to enter Kaitlyn's Nightmare World where they would find pieces of Kaitlyn's body. The first HouseGuest to put all the pieces together and complete the puzzle wins the Power of Veto. Kathryn finished first and won the Power of Veto. Before the Power of Veto Ceremony, Christie had a meltdown after her intuition told her that she's going up on the block. Christie starts contemplating using her Panic Power to make sure she is safe. Christie ends up not using her power; on Day 27, Kathryn took Jessica off the block, forcing Nick to nominate Nicole as the replacement nominee.
717	11	"Episode 11"	Days 27–30	July 18, 2019	3.79	1.0/5
The Gr8ful alliance formed a new alliance that excludes Nick and Isabella called the Six Shooters. The Six Shooters contemplate saving Nicole over Cliff. Nick and Isabella believe they secured the votes to evict Nicole while the Six Shooters progressively become more committed on the plan to blindside Cliff and send him home. On Day 30, by a vote of 6–4, with Isabella, Jessica, Kathryn and Sam voting to evict Nicole, Cliff became the third person to be evicted and entered Camp Comeback.: Camp Comeback Competition ("Path to Redemption"): Cliff, along with David, Ovi and Kemi, competed to re-enter the game. The "Camp Comebackers" had to roll balls down a platform that they could tilt and into their receptacle. The camper who sinks six balls in their receptacle within three minutes wins their way back into the game. Cliff won with 51 seconds left on the clock and re-entered the game and joined Big Brother 18 HouseGuest Victor Arroyo as the only HouseGuests in Big Brother history to re-enter the game twice in the same season, while David, Ovi and Kemi were forced to immediately leave the house for good.
Week 4
718	12	"Episode 12"	Days 30–31	July 21, 2019	4.27	1.1/6
After the vote, the Unde9able alliance blew up at each other and disbanded, leaving Nick and Isabella on the outs.: Head of Household ("Patch Perfect"): In each round, they were given a question about a board of Big Brother merit patches. If two people answer incorrectly, they are both out of the game, but it everyone answers correctly, the two people who buzzed in the slowest would be eliminated. It came down to Jack and Cliff. The HouseGuest to answer the question correctly first won the Head of Household. Cliff became the fourth Head of Household of the season.; The Have-Nots this week were Christie, Michie, Kathryn, and Tommy. Cliff tells Nick and Isabella that he is targeting the Six Shooters, the six people who voted to evict him. Michie comes up with a plan to be put up as a pawn. On Day 31, Jack and Michie were nominated for eviction by Cliff.
719	13	"Episode 13"	Days 31–34	July 24, 2019	3.88	1.0/6
A Have-Not ceremony took place, in which Cliff (as Head of Household) had to name the first four Have-Nots for the summer. He chose Christie, Michie, Kathryn and Tommy, who had to eat slop for the week, take cold showers and sleep in the same room as the Camp Comeback room. After picking players for the Power of Veto competition, Jack used his Chaos Power to force a re-draw on the three additional players.: Power of Veto ("Take It Off"): Similar to the first Roadkill competition in Big Brother 18, each houseguest had to strip down to their swimsuits while holding down all three buttons. This time, it was on a jet ski and any buttons released will speed up the timer: 10 times for one button, 30 times for two buttons and 60 times for all three buttons. Michie won the Power of Veto and, on Day 34, saved himself off the block, forcing Cliff to nominate Isabella as the replacement nominee, while Christie elected not to use the Panic ability for the second Veto Meeting in a row with only two more opportunities remaining to use it.
720	14	"Episode 14"	Days 34–37	July 25, 2019	3.87	1.0/6
Now on the Nomination Block as the replacement for Michie, Isabella begins campaigning to stay in the House and makes compelling arguments. The production team shows a segment featuring Cliff's family as they discuss how he's doing on the game. The two nominees, Jack and Isabella, are given a final chance to try and convince the HouseGuests not to evict them. The HouseGuests then participated in the live vote and eviction by voting on who they wished to evict from the Big Brother house. On Day 37, by a vote of 8–2, with Nick and Sam voting to evict Jack, Isabella was evicted from the House.: Head of Household ("Pose in Ivy"): (Note: This Head of Household competition began in episode 14 on Day 37. However, completion was not broadcast on television until episode 15.) HouseGuests had to stand and hold on to ropes in the air. If a HouseGuest were to fall off, they were eliminated and had to draw a chip from a bag. In the bag were two punishment chips that gave the drawers a punishment. The HouseGuest who outlasted all the others would become the next Head of Household.
Week 5
721	15	"Episode 15"	Days 37–38	July 28, 2019	4.30	1.0/6
Head of Household ("Pose in Ivy"): Holly outlasted all the others and became the Head of Household. Christie and Tommy picked the punishment chips and were given a punishment for the week.; The Have-Nots this week were Jessica, Nicole, and Sam. On Day 38, Nick and Sam were nominated for eviction by Holly.
722	16	"Episode 16"	Days 38–41	July 31, 2019	3.82	1.1/6
Power of Veto ("Counting Sheep on BB Farm"): In head-to-head rounds, HouseGuests were given a target number and had to herd sheep, identified with a number, into a sheep pen. The sum of the numbers the sheep represented had to equal the target number. The HouseGuest to get to the target number first won the round and another round would start. Nick won and, on Day 41, saved himself off the block, forcing Holly to nominate Kathryn as the replacement nominee after Christie did not use her Panic Power for the third week in a row.
723	17	"Episode 17"	Days 41–44	August 1, 2019	3.80	1.0/5
A plan was set in motion to flip the vote to evict Kathryn and use Sam to go after the Six Shooters; however, after a very hectic lead up to eviction, including the breakup of the dominant Six Shooters alliance shown on Sunday's episode, the plan crumbled and flipped back to a unanimous vote by the time Chen Moonves announced it was time to vote. On Day 44, by a unanimous vote of 9–0, Sam was evicted.: Head of Household ("Camp Expo"): (Note: This Head of Household competition began in episode 17 on Day 44. However, completion was not broadcast on television until episode 18.) The HouseGuests started studying pictures that they would later be asked questions about.
Week 6
724	18	"Episode 18"	Days 44–45	August 4, 2019	4.13	1.1/6
Shown in a flashback, the full story of the chaotic, yet unsuccessful effort to flip the vote to evict Kathryn was explained. The fight ultimately ended up with Christie and Michie yelling at each other over a "secret trio" of Kathryn, Holly and Michie. As a result, the Six Shooters alliance fractured into smaller alliances of duos and trios. Kathryn, who had been affiliated with the Six Shooters alliance, was cast out. Cliff, Nick, Nicole and Jessica overheard the fight; Kathryn joined them after being outcast.: Head of Household ("Camp Expo"): Holly gave the HouseGuests true or false questions about the pictures that they had just studied. If they got it right, they moved on to the next round, but if they got it wrong, they were eliminated from the competition. In the end, Jessica beat out Kathryn to become the Head of Household and, on Day 45, nominated Jack and Michie for eviction.
725	19	"Episode 19"	Days 45–48	August 7, 2019	3.97	1.1/6
Power of Veto ("Tossed in Space"): HouseGuests took turn catapulting an object into an area with a certain number of points. The HouseGuest who received the fewest points would receive the prize or punishment associated with their placement. The next person who was knocked out could either trade their current prize for their prize, or keep their prize. The HouseGuest to finish with the most points in the final round was able to pick whichever prize they wanted. In the end, Jack and Michie won a punishment, Tommy won a costume, Kathryn won a trip to Hawaii, Nick won $5,000 and Jessica won the Golden Power of Veto. Talks began to erupt about where Nick's vote lies after Jessica overheard Nick tell Christie that he is voting out Michie. Jessica made sure Nick was voting out Jack. Jessica talks with Holly, Kathryn, Nicole and Michie about potentially removing Michie off the block and putting Nick up after they talked about how he was playing both sides. However, on Day 48, Jessica decided not to use the Power of Veto, keeping her own nominations the same.
726	20	"Episode 20"	Days 48–51	August 8, 2019	3.87	1.0/6
Michie said he wouldn't campaign against Jack. The former Six Shooters had a meeting in the Have-Not room, but nothing was decided upon except for the fact that the "Six Shooters" alliance is done. Jack talked with Nick and Cliff to try to get their votes. On Day 51, by a vote of 6–2, with Analyse and Christie casting the only votes for Michie, Jack was evicted and became the first jury member. In his eviction interview, Jack was shown clips of controversial comments he'd made during the season.: Head of Household ("Time Me a River"): Inspired by Big Brother 20's "Perfect Timing," HouseGuests had to get to the other side of the yard in a canoe as close to nine seconds as possible. The HouseGuest with their time closest to nine seconds won the Head of Household. Tommy won with a time of 8.9 seconds.
Week 7
727	21	"Episode 21"	Days 51–52	August 11, 2019	4.58	1.2/7
Tommy plans on targeting Kathryn; he talks with Christie about plans where she would be guaranteed to go home. Tommy also talks about getting the Six Shooters (minus Jack) back together for the week.: America's Field Trip Competition ("Eggscape the Coop"): After America voted, Analyse, Christie and Michie competed in the competition. The HouseGuests had to transfer eggs through walls made of chicken wire. At the end of the wall, they had to roll the egg and knock down four pieces of wood spelling out the word SAFE. After all four boards were knocked down, they finished the competition. Michie finished first and received immunity. Analyse finished second and received a punishment. This meant Christie did not finish and thus lost the competition, becoming a special third nominee.; Nick promises to Tommy and Christie that if he wins the Power of Veto, he would remove Christie off the block. Analyse receives her punishment: she has to wear a chicken costume. On Day 52, Cliff and Kathryn were nominated for eviction by Tommy, alongside Christie.
728	22	"Episode 22"	Days 52–55	August 14, 2019	4.22	1.1/6
Power of Veto ("OTEV the Paranoid Pigeon"): At the beginning of each round, the HouseGuests were given a clue about a past competition by OTEV. They then had to slide down, find the item with the correct competition name on it and climb back up. The last HouseGuest to make it to the top (or if a HouseGuest got the answer wrong) would be eliminated from the competition. The last HouseGuest standing would win the Power of Veto. After it came down to Nick and Tommy, Tommy beat Nick up the slide and won the Veto and, on Day 55, took Christie off the block; however, since Christie was a special third nominee, no replacement nomination was made. Therefore, Cliff and Kathryn became the final nominees.
729	23	"Episode 23"	Days 55–58	August 15, 2019	4.18	1.0/6
Nick gives Cliff an offer to form a six with him, Christie, Tommy, Nicole and Analyse to which he said he would "do in a heartbeat." Nick gives the same offer to Nicole, but she doesn't trust Nick. Nicole becomes the swing vote between evicting Cliff and Kathryn and both nominees campaign to Nicole to keep them. After Nicole tells Jessica about the new six-person alliance, Jessica tells Kathryn about the alliance they were left out of, throwing Nick and Cliff under the bus. This news spreads to Michie and Holly, who plan on targeting Christie, Tommy, Nicole and Analyse. On Day 58, by a vote of 6–1, with Jessica casting the only vote for Cliff, Kathryn was evicted and became the second jury member.: Head of Household ("Aug-toberfest"): (Note: This Head of Household competition began in episode 23 on Day 58. However, completion was not broadcast on television until episode 24.) HouseGuests had to slide across a slippery path and deposit "beer" in their beer stein. The first HouseGuest to retrieve a ball from inside their stein won the Head of Household.
Week 8
730	24	"Episode 24"	Days 58–59	August 18, 2019	4.72	1.3/6
Head of Household ("Aug-toberfest"): Michie won the Head of Household.; On Day 59, Michie nominated Analyse and Christie for eviction.
731	25	"Episode 25"	Days 59–62	August 21, 2019	4.52	1.3/7
Christie starts thinking about Nick playing both sides. She tells both Analyse and Tommy about her thoughts, but blabbermouth Tommy goes to Nick and asks if he was working with the other side. He denied making a deal with them and he gets upset after he feels like no one trusts him.: Power of Veto ("Coral Grief"): HouseGuests had to balance different sea creatures of different weights on a moving structure. The first HouseGuest that hung all ten creatures and hit their button won. Michie beat all of the other HouseGuests and rang it, winning the Power of Veto, but on Day 62, chose not to use it, keeping his nominations the same.
732	26	"Episode 26"	Days 62–65	August 22, 2019	4.36	1.2/6
The vote starts flipping to evict Analyse after Christie talks with Michie about targeting Nick for future weeks. Nick overhears Christie talking about instigating a fight on Day 63 to paint a bigger target on Nick, dubbed as "Taco Tuesday." On Taco Tuesday, Christie calls out Nick for playing both sides of the house and throwing competitions, which Nick denies. On Day 65, by a vote of 5–1, with Nick casting the only vote to evict Christie, Analyse was evicted and became the third jury member. As a part of Prank Week, on Day 64, HouseGuests had to stay up during the night to listen to an exorbitant number of bird names and sounds as a joke to make the HouseGuests think that was for the Head of Household competition, but before the comp, they were informed about Prank Week and that the competition had nothing to do with bird sounds and names.: Head of Household ("Prank Shot"): HouseGuests had to roll a ball on a plank extending over number slots from 1–50. As the numbers get bigger, the plank got narrower. The two HouseGuests to receive the lowest scores will receive a special punishment. Holly became the ninth Head of Household with a perfect score of 50. Jessica had the lowest score with 3, while Cliff and Nicole tied for the second lowest with 18. They all received the punishment.
Week 9
733	27	"Episode 27"	Days 65–66	August 25, 2019	4.64	1.2/6
In a flashback prior to the eviction explaining how Christie saved herself and evicted Analyse. Michie and Holly talk about how the pranks from Prank Week will affect her Head of Household powers. Cliff, Jessica, and Nicole receive their punishment: they must make pies and then smash them in the face of the person the announcer tells them to. Cliff, Holly, Michie, and Nicole make an alliance aiming to reach the final four together. Holly announced to the HouseGuests the rules of America's Prankster and how the Head of Household only got to nominate one HouseGuest instead of the normal two. Later that day, Nick was told that he was America's Prankster. On Day 66, Holly nominated Nick, and Nick nominated Christie.
734	28	"Episode 28"	Days 66–69	August 28, 2019	4.27	1.1/6
Zingbot 9000 appeared this episode and delivered "zings" to the HouseGuests.: Power of Veto ("Free the Zing"): HouseGuests had to use a lever and pulley system to get balls up a wall and knock out twenty-seven cameras to help Zingbot escape the "Zing-itentiary". Michie ended up completing it first, winning the Power of Veto.; The House starts realizing that Nick is America's Prankster. Nick starts telling people he is the Prankster, and by the Power of Veto Ceremony, the whole house knows that Nick was the Prankster. On Day 69, Michie decided to not use the Power of Veto, leaving Christie and Nick on the block and vulnerable to eviction. Note: At the beginning of this episode, the starting sequence showed videos and images from last season as a prank to the viewers.
735	29	"Episode 29"	Days 69–72	August 29, 2019	3.45	0.9/5
Nick starts campaigning for votes, knowing that he was likely getting evicted. On Day 72, by a vote of 5–0, Nick was evicted and became the fourth jury member.: Head of Household ("Hold on Fright"): (Note: This Head of Household competition began in episode 29 on Day 72. However, completion was not broadcast on television until episode 30.) HouseGuests had to hang on to a wall and stay on the longest. Once a HouseGuest fell off the wall, they were out of the running for HoH. The HouseGuests who outlasts all the others became the Head of Household.
Week 10
736	30	"Episode 30"	Days 72–73	September 1, 2019	4.01	0.9/5
Head of Household ("Hold on Fright"): It came down to Michie and Tommy, and when Michie coerced Tommy down with the agreement of safety for the week, Michie became the new Head of Household.; Michie tells Christie he plans to nominate her and Jessica, but explains that Christie would only be a pawn. The new final four alliance of Cliff, Holly, Michie, and Nicole agree that if the Veto is used on either Christie or Jessica, Cliff would be the replacement. On Day 73, Michie nominated Christie and Jessica for eviction.
737	31	"Episode 31"	Days 73–76	September 4, 2019	4.45	1.2/7
Michie and Holly start fighting.: Power of Veto ("Hide and Go Veto"): HouseGuests had to hide a life preserver inside the House. After they were hid, HouseGuests had to search for other life preservers. After the fifth life preserver has been retrieved, their names will be announced. The HouseGuest whose life preserver who wasn't found would win. Tommy's life preserver was not found, meaning he won the Power of Veto.; On Day 76, Tommy decided to use the Power of Veto on Christie. Michie nominated Cliff as her replacement, making the final nominations Cliff and Jessica.
738	32	"Episode 32"	Days 76–79	September 5, 2019	4.16	1.1/5
On Day 79, by a vote of 4–0, Jessica was evicted and became the fifth jury member.: Head of Household ("On Thin Ice"): In this competition, HouseGuests had to build an ice rink out of puzzle pieces, and then score a goal using a hockey stick and a ball. The first HouseGuest who completed the puzzle and made the goal would win. Nicole won the Head of Household.; Christie and Tommy were nominated for eviction by Nicole.: Power of Veto ("What the Bleep?"): In this competition, Julie showed the competing HouseGuests clips of the show from throughout the summer that included conversations or speeches from evicted HouseGuests. However, one word or phrase was "bleeped" out and the HouseGuests must choose the correct word or phrase from two answers. The HouseGuests were then shown the rest of the clip. Answering correctly earned the competitors a point. The HouseGuest with the most points at the end became the winner. Cliff had the most points and won the Power of Veto.; Cliff decided to not use the Power of Veto, leaving Christie and Tommy vulnerable for eviction. By a vote of 3–0, Christie was evicted and became the sixth jury member.
Week 11
739	33	"Episode 33"	Days 79–80	September 8, 2019	4.75	1.2/5
A flashback to the previous episode shows the gameplay that transpired during the Double Eviction. Later, Big Brother 20 alumns Bayleigh Dayton and Chris "Swaggy C" Williams, who are currently engaged, appeared as guests to host the Head of Household competition.: Head of Household ("BBFlix & Chill"): Three fake movie poster were shown to the HouseGuests. A group of friends talked about what movie they wanted to watch, giving the HouseGuests clues on which movie they wanted to watch. HouseGuests then had to deduce from the clues and movie posters which movie the group of friends were going to watch. The first HouseGuest who rang in with the correct answer won one point. The first HouseGuest to earn five points would win the Head of Household. Michie won.; On Day 80, Michie nominated Cliff and Tommy for eviction.
740	34	"Episode 34"	Days 80–83	September 11, 2019	4.57	1.1/6
Tommy tells Michie and Holly that he knew Christie before entering the House.: Power of Veto ("BB Comics"): HouseGuests had to memorize comics of the HouseGuests while flying on a zip line. Then, players had to choose which of the given comics was the correct comic. The HouseGuest with the lowest time after giving the sixteen correct comics would win. Nicole won the Power of Veto with a time of 10:58.; Very soon after Nicole wins the Veto, Michie and Holly discuss the situation where if Nicole uses the Veto on Cliff, then Holly would automatically have to be nominated as she would be the only option. They also discuss how Cliff and Nicole would be the only votes to evict, meaning that whoever they decided to evict would go home. However, Nicole tells them that she is using it but promises that Holly will not be going home. Nicole then goes to Tommy and tells him that the decision isn't final and either one of them could be going home. On Day 83, Nicole decided to use the Power of Veto on Cliff. Michie had to automatically nominate Holly as his replacement, making the final nominations Holly and Tommy.
741	35	"Episode 35"	Days 83–86	September 12, 2019	4.56	1.2/6
To save himself, Tommy offers to throw the next Head of Household competition to either Cliff or Nicole, and in a confessional, confirmed that he was serious about it. On Day 86, by a vote of 2–0, Tommy was evicted and became the seventh jury member.: Head of Household ("Crash and Turn"): (Note: This Head of Household competition began in episode 35 on Day 86. However, completion was not broadcast on television until episode 36.) HouseGuests had to stand on a pedestal suspended from a wire that moved in circles. In the pedestal's path was a foam truck which HouseGuests were slapped with. The HouseGuest who stood on the pedestal the longest won the Head of Household.
Week 12
742	36	"Episode 36"	Days 86–87	September 15, 2019	4.59	1.2/5
A flashback to right before the live eviction shows the house meeting. The meeting immediately turned into a fight between Michie and Tommy over a lie Michie told about them aligning to get Cliff evicted.: Head of Household ("Crash and Turn"): Holly and Cliff both throw the competition to Nicole, and it ends in just a few minutes. Nicole became the new Head of Household.; Cliff and Michie form a Final 2 deal, effectively meaning that they plan on evicting Holly at the Final 4 and Nicole at the Final 3. On Day 87, Nicole nominated Holly and Michie for eviction.
743	37	"Episode 37"	Days 87–90	September 18, 2019	4.33	1.1/5
Cliff tells Michie that he will not be taking him to the Final 2, and instead will be taking Nicole. He then says he still wants Michie to take him to the Final 2.: Luxury Competition ("Change of Scenery"): Ovi Kabir, who was voted out second, returned to host the luxury competition. HouseGuests had to search around the House for items that had changed. The first player to correctly answer or get the closest answer won $10,000. Michie got closest after he was the first to ring in with 17 changes. The correct answer was 18.; Power of Veto ("Win and You're In"): HouseGuests had to correctly match different HouseGuests with different statements, such as "evicted unanimously." Once a HouseGuest knocks down the correct HouseGuests, they move on to the next round. If a HouseGuest accidentally knocked down the wrong HouseGuest, they had to start the round over. The HouseGuest to finish all three rounds in the least amount of time won the Power of Veto. Michie won with a time of 11:29.
744	38	"Episode 38"	Days 90–93	September 19, 2019	4.38	1.1/6
Michie tells Nicole that he will not be taking Cliff to the Final 3, backstabbing Cliff and Nicole. Nicole tells Cliff that he's not getting to the Final 3. A flashback to the jury house shows the reactions and aftermath of Nick, Jessica, Christie, and Tommy entering the jury. On Day 93, Michie decided to use the Power of Veto on himself. Nicole had to automatically nominate Cliff as his replacement, making the final nominations Cliff and Holly. By Michie's sole vote, Cliff was evicted and became the eighth jury member.
Week 13
745	39	"Episode 39"	Day 93; Various (Note: The episode featured flashbacks to various events in the house that explained how the Final 3 got to where they were.)	September 22, 2019	4.96	1.3/6
The final three of last year's season, JC Mounduix, Tyler Crispen, and Kaycee Clark came back to give their thoughts on the season.: Head of Household: The final Head of Household competition of the season consisted of three parts. The winner of the first part immediately advances to the third part, while the other two HouseGuests move on to compete in part two. In the final part, the winner of part one faces the winner of part two. The winner of the final part becomes the final HoH of the season.; Part 1: ("Raiders of the BB Relics") HouseGuests had to complete an obstacle course and then complete a 3-dimensional puzzle. After they completed the puzzle, they had to transfer twenty-five coins, one at a time, to the start of the course. Michie completed the task first, winning the first part of the Head of Household competition.
746	40	"Episode 40"	Days 93–99	September 25, 2019	4.20	1.2/6
Will Kirby, Big Brother 2 and Big Brother 7 alum, returned to host the Jury Roundtable where the jury discussed who deserved to win Big Brother.: Head of Household: Part 2: ("Foggy Memory") HouseGuests had to match pictures to Day numbers. Once they found the number, they had to climb up a wall and place it with the picture. The HouseGuest to correctly fill the wall in the least amount of time won. Holly won with a time of 10:38; therefore, Nicole was automatically nominated.; Part 3: ("The Jury is Out") Holly and Michie had to watch a series of videos featuring jury members. The jury members made three statements about their time in the Big Brother House. Then, Holly and Michie had to guess which one was false. If they correctly guessed it, they got a point. The HouseGuest to get the most questions correct won the final part. Michie won with 8 points, automatically nominating Holly alongside Nicole.; On Day 99, by Michie's sole vote, Nicole was evicted and became the ninth and final jury member. The jury, then joined by Nicole, questioned Michie and Holly as to why they should win. Chen-Moonves gave the pre-jury a time to talk about different controversies that happened in the House and gave the other HouseGuests a time to say what they wanted to say. The jury, by a vote of 6–3, named Michie the winner of the season.

== Voting history ==
Color key:

Winner
Runner-up
Head of Household
Nominated for eviction
Immune from eviction
Won Immunity via competition
Not eligible to vote
Evicted
Re-entered the game

Voting history (season 21)
	Week 1		Week 2	Week 3		Week 4	Week 5	Week 6	Week 7	Week 8	Week 9	Week 10		Week 11	Week 12	Week 13	
	Day 1	Day 8	Week 2	Eviction	Comeback	Week 4	Week 5	Week 6	Week 7	Week 8	Week 9	Day 73	Day 79 (Note: This week was a double eviction week. Following the first eviction, the remaining HouseGuests played a week's worth of games – including Head of Household and veto competitions; and nomination, veto, and eviction ceremonies – during the live show, culminating in a second eviction for the week.)	Week 11	Week 12	Day 99	Finale
Head of Household	Michie (Note: On day 1, the HouseGuests were given the task of voting for a Camp Director. The HouseGuests were told that the Camp Director would receive immunity for the first week, but would be ineligible to compete in the first Head of Household competition. Michie was elected as Camp Director.)	Christie	Jack	Nick	(None)	Cliff	Holly	Jessica	Tommy	Michie	Holly	Michie	Nicole	Michie	Nicole	Michie	(None)
Nominations (initial)	Cliff; David; Jessica; Kemi	Cliff; Kathryn	Jessica; Kemi	Cliff; Jessica	(None)	Jack; Michie	Nick; Sam	Jack; Michie	Christie (Note: Analyse, Christie, and Michie were selected by the viewers to participate in the "America's Field Trip" competition. Michie won and received immunity for the week. For finishing last, Christie became a third nominee, and her nomination did not require a replacement when the veto was used on her.); Cliff; Kathryn	Analyse; Christie	Christie (Note: The viewers voted for Nick to be "America's Prankster", who took half of Holly's Head of Household power by anonymously nominating Christie for eviction.); Nick	Christie; Jessica	Christie; Tommy	Cliff; Tommy	Holly; Michie	(None)	(None)
Veto winner	(None)	Sam	Sam	Kathryn	(None)	Michie	Nick	Jessica	Tommy	Michie	Michie	Tommy	Cliff	Nicole	Michie	(None)	(None)
Nominations (final)	(None)	Kathryn; Ovi	Jessica; Kemi	Cliff; Nicole	(None)	Isabella; Jack	Kathryn; Sam	Jack; Michie	Cliff; Kathryn	Analyse; Christie	Christie; Nick	Cliff; Jessica	Christie; Tommy	Holly; Tommy	Cliff; Holly	Holly; Nicole	(None)
Michie	Camp Director	Ovi	Jessica	Cliff	No vote	Isabella	Sam	Nominated	Kathryn	Head of Household	Nick	Head of Household	Christie	Head of Household	Cliff	Nicole (Note: As Head of Household, Michie chose to evict Nicole.)	Winner
Holly	No vote	Ovi	Kemi	Cliff	No vote	Isabella	Head of Household	Jack	Kathryn	Analyse	Head of Household	Jessica	Christie	Nominated	Nominated	Nominated	Runner-up
Nicole	No vote	Ovi	Kemi	Nominated	No vote	Isabella	Sam	Jack	Kathryn	Analyse	Nick	Jessica	Head of Household	Tommy	Head of Household	Evicted (Day 99)	Holly
Cliff	Banished (Note: Michie had to banish four HouseGuests, who then competed in a challenge to stay in the house. Michie chose Cliff, David, Jessica, and Kemi. David lost the competition and was officially banished; Cliff, Jessica, and Kemi were able to re-enter the game.)	Ovi	Kemi	Nominated	Camp Comeback (Day 30) (Note: Instead of permanent eviction, David, Ovi, Kemi, and Cliff competed for an opportunity to re-enter the game through the "Camp Comeback" twist. Cliff won this competition.)	Head of Household	Sam	Jack	Nominated	Analyse	Nick	Nominated	Christie	Tommy	Nominated	Re-evicted (Day 93)	Michie
Tommy	No vote	Ovi	Kemi	Cliff	No vote	Isabella	Sam	Jack	Head of Household	Analyse	Nick	Jessica	Nominated	Nominated	Evicted (Day 86)		Michie
Christie	No vote	Head of Household	Kemi	Cliff	No vote	Isabella	Sam	Michie	Kathryn	Nominated	Nominated	Jessica	Nominated	Evicted (Day 79)			Michie
Jessica	Banished	Ovi	Nominated	Nicole	No vote	Isabella	Sam	Head of Household	Cliff	Analyse	Nick	Nominated	Evicted (Day 79)				Holly
Nick	No vote	Ovi	Kemi	Head of Household	No vote	Jack	Sam	Jack	Kathryn	Christie	Nominated	Evicted (Day 72)					Michie
Analyse	No vote	Ovi	Kemi	Cliff	No vote	Isabella	Sam	Michie	Kathryn	Nominated	Evicted (Day 65)						Michie
Kathryn	No vote	Nominated	Kemi	Nicole	No vote	Isabella	Nominated	Jack	Nominated	Evicted (Day 58)							Holly
Jack	No vote	Ovi	Head of Household	Cliff	No vote	Nominated	Sam	Nominated	Evicted (Day 51)								Michie
Sam	No vote	Ovi	Kemi	Nicole	No vote	Jack	Nominated	Evicted (Day 44)									
Isabella	No vote	Ovi	Kemi	Nicole	No vote	Nominated	Evicted (Day 37)										
Kemi	Banished	Ovi	Nominated	Camp Comeback (Day 23)		Remained evicted (Day 30)											
Ovi	No vote	Nominated	Camp Comeback (Day 15)			Remained evicted (Day 30)											
David	Banished	Evicted (Day 1)	Camp Comeback (Day 15)			Remained evicted (Day 30)											
Evicted	David; Evicted by competition	Ovi; 12 of 12 votes to evict	Kemi; 10 of 11 votes to evict	Cliff; 6 of 10 votes to evict	Cliff; Won re-entry into game	Isabella; 8 of 10 votes to evict	Sam; 9 of 9 votes to evict	Jack; 6 of 8 votes to evict	Kathryn; 6 of 7 votes to evict	Analyse; 5 of 6 votes to evict	Nick; 5 of 5 votes to evict	Jessica; 4 of 4 votes to evict	Christie; 3 of 3 votes to evict	Tommy; 2 of 2 votes to evict	Cliff; Michie's choice to evict	Nicole; Michie's choice to evict	Michie; 6 votes to win
Evicted	David; Evicted by competition	Ovi; 12 of 12 votes to evict	Kemi; 10 of 11 votes to evict	Cliff; 6 of 10 votes to evict	Cliff; Won re-entry into game	Isabella; 8 of 10 votes to evict	Sam; 9 of 9 votes to evict	Jack; 6 of 8 votes to evict	Kathryn; 6 of 7 votes to evict	Analyse; 5 of 6 votes to evict	Nick; 5 of 5 votes to evict	Jessica; 4 of 4 votes to evict	Christie; 3 of 3 votes to evict	Tommy; 2 of 2 votes to evict	Cliff; Michie's choice to evict	Nicole; Michie's choice to evict	Holly; 3 votes to win

== Production ==
=== Development ===
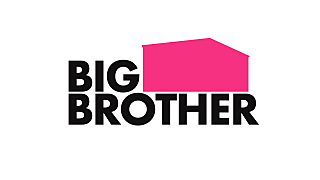
Logo used for pre-season press releases.

CBS announced that Big Brother had been renewed for a twenty-first season on May 15, 2019. CBS later announced on May 20, 2019 that the twenty-first season was set to premiere on June 25, 2019. Unnamed insiders close to the production of the show previously cast doubt if Julie Chen Moonves would return to host following sexual misconduct allegations against her husband, former CBS CEO Les Moonves. Chen Moonves, however, returned for the second season of Celebrity Big Brother and it was later announced that she would return as host of the main series as well. Casting for the season was open until April 5, 2019. Allison Grodner and Rich Meehan returned as executive producers for the series which is produced by Fly on the Wall Entertainment, in association with Endemol Shine North America. The season featured an initial timeslot change from previous seasons; new episodes aired on a Sunday/Tuesday/Wednesday schedule through the first six episodes before returning to a traditional Sunday/Wednesday/Thursday schedule as in previous seasons. The 24/7 internet live feeds also returned with a CBS All Access subscription following the two-night season premiere on June 26. Big Brother: After Dark returned on Pop for its fourteenth season overall and fifth season on Pop following the two-night premiere on June 26 or June 27, depending on viewers local time zones. Off the Block with Ross and Marissa did not return for a second season as an aftershow interviewing HouseGuests after their eviction. Replacing Off the Block, Big Brother host Chen-Moonves hosted extended interviews with the evicted HouseGuests from outside the house.

=== Casting ===
Kassting, Inc. returned to provide casting services for a twentieth consecutive season since Big Brother 2, with Robyn Kass serving as the casting director.

=== Filming ===
Taken from the entryway of the house, the camp theme in the house can be seen from the hanging lanterns and the tree set piece. The ladder leading to the upstairs lounge, "treehouse" or "skybridge" is on the right. In the background, the living room featuring the LED light illuminated 23-foot triangular window can be seen.

As with previous seasons, the program is filmed at CBS Studios, soundstage 18 in Studio City, California in a custom-built two-story house. The House is equipped with 94 high-definition cameras and over 113 microphones to monitor and record the HouseGuests. The living room, three bedrooms, kitchen, dining room, bathroom and lounge room are located on the first floor. The Head of Household bedroom and bathroom and an additional lounge area known as the "Sky Bridge" are located on the second floor. The second floor is accessible by a ladder located in the entry way or a spiral staircase located in the kitchen next to the sliding glass doors that lead to the backyard. The backyard area features outdoor amenities for the HouseGuests. The house also features two diary rooms where the HouseGuests can privately share thoughts or send requests to producers of the series.

=== Production design ===
The theme for this season is a summer camp called "Camp B.B." The house, competitions and twists were designed around the camp theme. Entertainment Tonight showed the first look at the house with Kevin Frazier during their episode on the night of June 20, 2019. Entertainment Tonight then released a sneak peek of the house through a brief tour on their website on June 21. Meanwhile, a full house tour with Chen Moonves and other photos were released through Big Brother's and CBS' social media outlets including Instagram, Twitter and Facebook. Big Brother 21 house theme matched the season's overall theme and received a camp theme; Production Designer Scott Storey designed the house's features. The living room features a birch-wood coffee table and a large and a 23-foot triangular window illuminated by LED lights. The first bedroom features a "sleeping under the stars" theme and includes two double-beds and the exterior of a camper. The camper, is only a facade into the second bedroom which features three double-beds and is assumed to be that of a camp counselors bedroom. The third and final downstairs bedroom is a sports-themed bedroom primarily based on archery. In the kitchen, many of the appliances have been redone in an attempt to blend them in with the rest of the theme, with an electronic campfire added to the center of the formal dining table. The downstairs lounge area received a boat theme, while the bathroom received a boat house-like theme. The upstairs lounge area, for the first time in the series history, is also accessible by a ladder from the entryway and has been updated to resemble a tree house; the Head of Household bedroom and bathroom have been changed to resemble a Moroccan-style bedroom and is expected to resemble glamping. The backyard features a pool with kayaks and an attached hot tub, lawn chairs surround the backyard which also features a pool table and a washer and dryer, workout equipment, outdoor lounge areas, a hammock and a mini-fridge.

=== Prizes ===
The last remaining HouseGuest, Jackson Michie, received $500,000. The runner-up of the season, Holly Allen, received $50,000 while the HouseGuest deemed America's Favorite HouseGuest, Nicole Anthony, received $25,000. As part of a promotion for new CBS series Love Island, Sam Smith won a trip to Fiji in a Power of Veto competition. During another Power of Veto competition, Kathryn Dunn received a trip to Hawaii and Nick Maccarone was awarded $5,000. During a surprise luxury competition in Week 12, Michie won $10,000.

== Reception ==
This season was the least-watched and lowest-rated season of the series with about a 20% decrease in viewers and 25% decrease in demographics from the previous season. The season ended with an average viewership per episode of 4.38 million, over one million fewer than the previous lowest. Despite the decrease in ratings, CBS announced on September 5, 2019 that Big Brother was renewed for its twenty-second season and will premiere in the summer of 2020.

=== Critical responses ===
Big Brother 21 was criticized negatively by critics and fans due to the HouseGuests' discriminatory tendencies. Professor of African American studies and the UCLA Dean of Social Sciences, Darnell Hunt, stated, "Race is the central axis of social relationships. Even when, in public, we try to deny its significance, it creeps through in unexpected ways. When people are in a house like that 24 hours a day under those conditions, it's difficult to hide an inconvenient truth about American culture and society. The camera is the great equalizer." However, the way CBS handled the situations was somewhat praised by viewers as they dedicated a time during the live finale to address them and let the HouseGuests explain themselves. Justin Carriero of The Young Folks wrote, "These HouseGuests got away with a lot and they avoided the blowback by being in jury, so they had no idea what storm was heading their way. They needed to know what they did and how the public viewed them." He ended up rating the finale an eight on a scale from one to ten. Overall, the season was criticized for its non-diverse casting, leniency with specific rules like Have-Not rules, and deceptive editing of the episodes compared to the events shown on the 24/7 Live Feeds.

==== Racial optics ====
Following the two-night season premiere, HouseGuest Jackson Michie received the "Camp Director" power and was required to choose four HouseGuests to banish. Michie chose David Alexander and Kemi Fakunle, the season's only two black HouseGuests, Jessica Milagros, a Latina plus-size model and Cliff Hogg, the oldest person in the house. But, other viewers suggested that Michie only picked Fakunle due to lack of communication and that Alexander, Milagros and Hogg were only picked because they competed against him for the position of Camp Director.

Big Brother is a reality show about a group of people who live together at times, the Houseguests may reveal prejudices and other beliefs that CBS does not condone. Views or opinions expressed by Houseguests are those of the individuals speaking and do not represent the views or opinions of CBS. Viewer discretion is advised.

— CBS disclaimer reportedly appearing more since the incident

Once the Live Feeds began, Jack Matthews started making obscene and prejudiced remarks about fellow HouseGuests Kemi Fakunle, Ovi Kabir, and Jessica Milagros, behind their backs. Matthews was warned by production about comments made and to prevent further such comments. Many of his comments were addressed in episode 20 during his post-eviction interview with Julie Chen Moonves where he denied racism being behind any of the comments, though he did apologize for his actions that were deemed offensive.

==== Week 3 incident ====
During Week 3, an incident involving the dominant "Gr8ful" alliance, which was partially shown during episode 10, was sharply criticized by the viewing audience. The incident started when Nicole Anthony confided in Isabella Wang, telling her that the majority alliance, spearheaded by Jack Matthews and Jackson Michie, would come after Wang and Nick Maccarone, but Wang, who was included in this majority alliance with Maccarone, immediately told the group about it. The alliance swiftly denied Anthony's idea that they would target the couple despite earlier conversations where they discussed targeting them. The group proceeded to speak very negatively of Anthony. This incident was brought back up during the live finale to give the HouseGuests a chance to talk about the matter.

==== Have-Not cheating ====
During Week 4, Cliff Hogg, the then Head of Household, named Jackson Michie as one of the Have-Nots for the week. Despite being named as a Have-Not, Michie was seen on the Live Feeds breaking the Have-Not rules by eating prohibited food behind the shower wall out of camera view. Michie received no punishment normally given to HouseGuests who break the Have-Not rules. After this incident, the Have-Nots aspect of the game was not included for the remainder of the season.

==== Statements from CBS ====
"Well, in the case of Big Brother, a producer—we learned that a producer, in an attempt to get a soundbite from one of the houseguests overstepped. That producer was reprimanded, received unconscious bias training—as did all the producers on the show—and we don't believe that an incident like that will happen again."

— Thom Sherman, CBS Executive responding to the incident in question

At the 2019 Television Critics Association, CBS executives were questioned about diversity and racism issues on Big Brother. In an open interview with CBS executives, Big Brother was accused of giving "contestants of color unfair cuts or early eliminations" as well as editing out comments by HouseGuests that have been interpreted as racist. CBS executives defended editors of the show stating that it's difficult to edit days worth of content into 40 minutes. CBS executives also stated that they would "closely reexamine Big Brother 21 and see if we can do better next year."

=== Viewing figures ===
==== United States ====
Viewership and ratings per episode of Big Brother 21
No.	Title	Air date	Timeslot (ET)	Rating/share (18–49)	Viewers (millions)	DVR (18–49)	DVR viewers (millions)	Total (18–49)	Total viewers (millions)
1	"Episode 1"	June 25, 2019	Tuesday 8:00 p.m.	1.3/7	4.93	0.68	1.76	1.96	6.70
2	"Episode 2"	June 26, 2019	Wednesday 8:00 p.m.	1.1/6	4.52	0.77	2.02	1.89	6.55
3	"Episode 3"	June 30, 2019	Sunday 8:00 p.m.	1.0/6	4.32	0.64	1.85	1.67	6.18
4	"Episode 4"	July 2, 2019	Tuesday 8:00 p.m.	1.1/6	4.46	0.62	1.58	1.69	6.04
5	"Episode 5"	July 3, 2019	Wednesday 8:00 p.m.	1.1/7	4.25	0.67	1.75	1.72	6.06
6	"Episode 6"	July 7, 2019	Sunday 8:00 p.m.	1.0/5	4.32	0.54	1.44	1.59	5.76
7	"Episode 7"	July 10, 2019	Wednesday 9:00 p.m.	1.1/6	4.15	0.64	1.66	1.73	5.82
8	"Episode 8"	July 11, 2019	Thursday 9:00 p.m.	1.0/6	4.05	0.57	1.49	1.62	5.55
9	"Episode 9"	July 14, 2019	Sunday 8:00 p.m.	1.0/6	4.20	0.60	1.54	1.63	5.76
10	"Episode 10"	July 17, 2019	Wednesday 9:00 p.m.	1.0/6	4.00	0.60	1.63	1.61	5.64
11	"Episode 11"	July 18, 2019	Thursday 9:00 p.m.	1.0/5	3.79	0.62	1.65	1.60	5.45
12	"Episode 12"	July 21, 2019	Sunday 8:00 p.m.	1.1/6	4.27	0.53	1.37	1.64	5.66
13	"Episode 13"	July 24, 2019	Wednesday 9:00 p.m.	1.0/6	3.88	0.47	1.19	1.49	5.09
14	"Episode 14"	July 25, 2019	Thursday 9:00 p.m.	1.0/6	3.87	0.49	1.25	1.53	5.15
15	"Episode 15"	July 28, 2019	Sunday 8:00 p.m.	1.0/6	4.30	0.46	1.23	1.49	5.55
16	"Episode 16"	July 31, 2019	Wednesday 9:00 p.m.	1.1/6	3.82	0.52	1.30	1.60	5.14
17	"Episode 17"	August 1, 2019	Thursday 9:00 p.m.	1.0/5	3.80	0.48	1.26	1.47	5.09
18	"Episode 18"	August 4, 2019	Sunday 8:00 p.m.	1.1/6	4.13	0.44	1.16	1.50	5.32
19	"Episode 19"	August 7, 2019	Wednesday 9:00 p.m.	1.1/6	3.97	0.45	1.24	1.55	5.23
20	"Episode 20"	August 8, 2019	Thursday 9:00 p.m.	1.0/6	3.87	0.54	1.48	1.58	5.38
21	"Episode 21"	August 11, 2019	Sunday 8:00 p.m.	1.2/7	4.58	0.48	1.21	1.67	5.81
22	"Episode 22"	August 14, 2019	Wednesday 8:00 p.m.	1.1/6	4.22	0.48	1.20	1.57	5.47
23	"Episode 23"	August 15, 2019	Thursday 9:00 p.m.	1.0/6	4.18	0.53	1.35	1.58	5.55
24	"Episode 24"	August 18, 2019	Sunday 8:07 p.m.	1.3/6	4.72	0.45	1.17	1.74	5.91
25	"Episode 25"	August 21, 2019	Wednesday 8:00 p.m.	1.3/7	4.52	0.42	1.12	1.73	5.65
26	"Episode 26"	August 22, 2019	Thursday 9:00 p.m.	1.2/6	4.36	0.54	1.43	1.71	5.82
27	"Episode 27"	August 25, 2019	Sunday 8:00 p.m.	1.2/6	4.64	0.42	1.09	1.59	5.75
28	"Episode 28"	August 28, 2019	Wednesday 8:00 p.m.	1.1/6	4.27	0.48	1.21	1.59	5.50
29	"Episode 29"	August 29, 2019	Thursday 9:00 p.m.	0.9/5	3.45	0.60	1.58	1.48	5.07
30	"Episode 30"	September 1, 2019	Sunday 8:00 p.m.	0.9/5	4.01	0.59	1.43	1.52	5.45
31	"Episode 31"	September 4, 2019	Wednesday 8:00 p.m.	1.2/7	4.45	0.44	1.12	1.60	5.58
32	"Episode 32"	September 5, 2019	Thursday 9:00 p.m.	1.1/5	4.16	0.54	1.41	1.61	5.60
33	"Episode 33"	September 8, 2019	Sunday 8:00 p.m.	1.2/5	4.75	0.43	1.12	1.65	5.89
34	"Episode 34"	September 11, 2019	Wednesday 8:00 p.m.	1.1/6	4.57	0.44	1.24	1.53	5.77
35	"Episode 35"	September 12, 2019	Thursday 9:00 p.m.	1.2/6	4.56	0.42	1.17	1.59	5.75
36	"Episode 36"	September 15, 2019	Sunday 8:00 pm. Sunday 8:21 pm (Note: In select markets.)	1.2/5	4.59	0.44	1.09	1.60	5.69
37	"Episode 37"	September 18, 2019	Wednesday 8:00 p.m.	1.1/5	4.33	0.41	1.14	1.49	5.48
38	"Episode 38"	September 19, 2019	Thursday 9:00 p.m.	1.1/6	4.38	0.49	1.29	1.59	5.69
39	"Episode 39"	September 22, 2019	Sunday 8:47 p.m.	1.3/6	4.96	0.38	1.07	1.65	6.05
40	"Episode 40"	September 25, 2019	Wednesday 9:30 p.m.	1.2/6	4.20	0.48	1.38	1.74	5.60

==== Canada ====
No.	Air date	Timeslot (ET)	Total viewers (AMA (Note: Average minute audience (AMA) is the average number of individuals or (homes or target group) viewing a TV channel, which is calculated per minute during a specified period of time over the program duration.) in millions)	Rank (week)	Refs
1	Tuesday, June 25, 2019	8:00 p.m.	1.385	3	
2	Wednesday, June 26, 2019	8:00 p.m.	1.391	2	
3	Sunday, June 30, 2019	8:00 p.m.	1.154	6	
4	Tuesday, July 2, 2019	8:00 p.m.	0.983	9	
5	Wednesday, July 3, 2019	8:00 p.m.	1.211	3	
6	Sunday, July 7, 2019	8:00 p.m.	1.042	7	
7	Wednesday, July 10, 2019	9:00 p.m.	1.080	6	
8	Thursday, July 11, 2019	9:00 p.m.	1.194	5	
9	Sunday, July 14, 2019	8:00 p.m.	1.222	4	
10	Wednesday, July 17, 2019	9:00 p.m.	1.217	5	
11	Thursday, July 18, 2019	9:00 p.m.	1.099	6	
12	Sunday, July 21, 2019	8:00 p.m.	1.097	7	
13	Wednesday, July 24, 2019	9:00 p.m.	1.282	4	
14	Thursday, July 25, 2019	9:00 p.m.	1.312	3	
15	Sunday, July 28, 2019	8:00 p.m.	1.277	5	
16	Wednesday, July 31, 2019	9:00 p.m.	1.060	7	
17	Thursday, August 1, 2019	9:00 p.m.	0.899	10	
18	Sunday, August 4, 2019	8:00 p.m.	1.174	5	
19	Wednesday, August 7, 2019	9:00 p.m.	0.920	12	
20	Thursday, August 8, 2019	9:00 p.m.	1.194	6	
21	Sunday, August 11, 2019	8:00 p.m.	1.137	9	
22	Wednesday, August 14, 2019	8:00 p.m.	1.315	3	
23	Thursday, August 15, 2019	9:00 p.m.	1.178	7	
24	Sunday, August 18, 2019	8:00 p.m.	0.903	14	
25	Wednesday, August 21, 2019	8:00 p.m.	0.908	10	
26	Thursday, August 22, 2019	9:00 p.m.	1.206	7	
27	Sunday, August 25, 2019	8:00 p.m.	1.169	9	
28	Wednesday, August 28, 2019	8:00 p.m.	1.221	3	
29	Thursday, August 29, 2019	9:00 p.m.	1.175	4	
30	Sunday, September 1, 2019	8:00 p.m.	1.115	7	
31	Wednesday, September 4, 2019	8:00 p.m.	1.045	9	
32	Thursday, September 5, 2019	9:00 p.m.	1.124	6	
33	Sunday, September 8, 2019	8:00 p.m.	1.115	7	
34	Wednesday, September 11, 2019	8:00 p.m.	0.951	10	
35	Thursday, September 12, 2019	9:00 p.m.	1.129	6	
36	Sunday, September 15, 2019	8:00 p.m.	1.173	4	
37	Wednesday, September 18, 2019	8:00 p.m.	1.011	8	
38	Thursday, September 19, 2019	9:00 p.m.	1.164	6	
39	Sunday, September 22, 2019	8:00 p.m.	1.182	5	
40	Wednesday, September 25, 2019	9:30 p.m.	1.350	19	
