= Evan Todd =

American actor and producer (born 1989)

- Born: February 25, 1989 (age 37); Kissimmee, Florida, U.S.
- Education: Juilliard School (BFA)
- Occupations: Actor, producer
- Years active: 2007–present

Evan Todd (born February 25, 1989) is an American actor and producer.

== Life and career ==
Todd grew up in Kissimmee, Florida. He is of Italian descent. He finished his senior year of high school at the North Carolina School of the Arts in Winston-Salem and later graduated from the Juilliard School. Todd also attended summer programs at Yale School of Drama and London Academy of Music and Dramatic Art.

In 2007, Todd made his big screen debut as a student in the 2007 film Sydney White. He subsequently appeared in several television films and series such as Grumpy Cat's Worst Christmas Ever (2014), Switched at Birth and Jane the Virgin. In 2014, he originated the role of Kurt Kelly in Heathers: The Musical, when the rock musical had a production Off-Broadway. The following year, Todd co-produced the 2015 Broadway revival of Spring Awakening. A critical success, the rock musical, based on the German play Spring Awakening (1891) by Frank Wedekind, was nominated for both a Tony Award and a Drama Desk Award for Outstanding Revival of a Musical.

In 2016, Todd had a leading role in the comedy film 4th Man Out about a young mechanic who comes out to his straight buddies and to his family. The film received the Audience Choice Award for Best Dramatic Feature at Outfest, and was awarded the Audience Award for Best Narrative Feature at the InsideOut LGBT Film Festival. In March 2017, Todd joined the Broadway cast of Beautiful: The Carole King Musical as King's songwriter first husband and writing partner Gerry Goffin. In 2022, he played Mark in the world premiere production of Which Way to the Stage off-Broadway.

Todd is gay. He is the co-founder of stART and artsINSIDEOUT, two summer arts empowerment programs benefiting students from his home town as well as children affected by HIV in South Africa.

== Filmography ==
Film
Year	Title	Role	Notes
2007	Sydney White	Student	
2011	Extremely Decent	Various	
2015	4th Man Out	Adam	
2015	Damsel	Casey	
2016	Walk with Me		Short film
2018	Monogamish	Ashley	Short film
2018	The Male Gaze: First Kiss	Ryan	

Television
Year	Title	Role	Notes
2011	Extremely Decent	Various	Television film
2014	Grumpy Cat's Worst Christmas Ever	Zack	Television film
2015	Switched at Birth	Carl	Episode: "How Does a Girl Like You Get to Be a Girl Like You"
2016	Liv and Maddie	Zach	Episode: "Roll Model-A-Rooney"
2017–2019	Jane the Virgin	Jeremy Howe	5 episodes
2019	Blindspot	Clay Roga	Episode: "The Big Reveal"
