= Max Jenkins =

American actor and writer

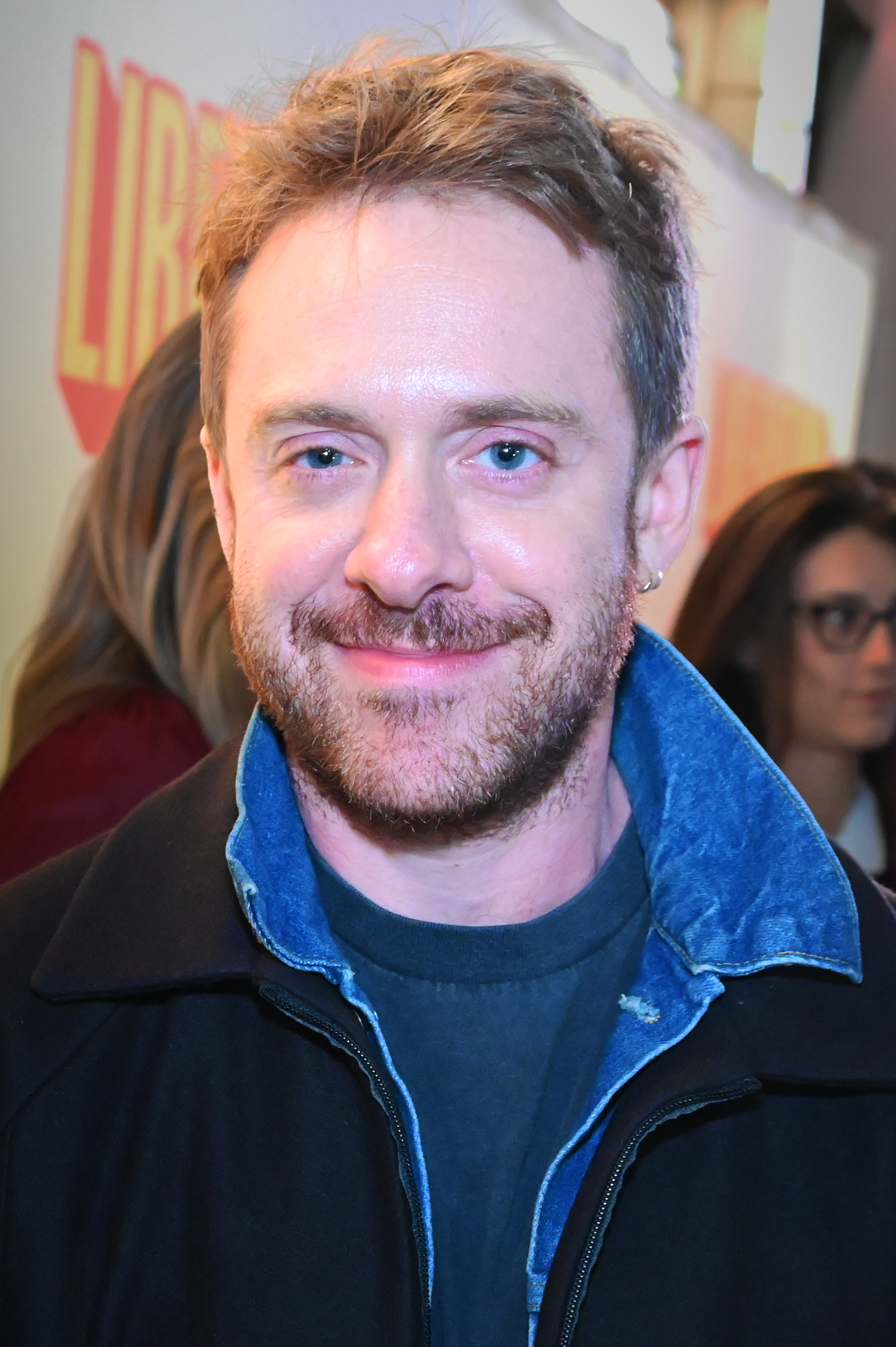
- Jenkins in 2025
- Born: March 13, 1985 (age 40); New York City
- Occupation(s): Actor, writer
- Years active: 2009–present

Max Jenkins (born March 13, 1985) is an American actor and writer. He starred as Max Carnegie in NBC's comedy-drama detective series The Mysteries of Laura. He is also known for his appearances in the HBO series High Maintenance.

== Career ==
Jenkins was first seen on High Maintenance in the webisode "Olivia" in 2013, guest-starring opposite Heléne Yorke. BuzzFeed lauded Jenkins and Yorke in their list of "16 Scene-Stealers From TV Comedy" in 2014, while Indiewire praised "Olivia" as "one of the series' strongest and most popular episodes."

Jenkins has also given critically acclaimed performances in various New York theatre productions, notably Unnatural Acts at Classic Stage Company. The play, co-written by Jenkins and other members of the cast, was nominated for three 2012 Drama Desk Awards, including Outstanding Play.

Upon the premiere of The Mysteries of Laura on September 17, 2014, The Los Angeles Times cited Jenkins as "fabulous," adding that he "may deserve a show of his own."

In August 2018, it was announced that Jenkins was cast as Christopher Doyle in the Netflix dark comedy series, Dead to Me.

In 2022, he played Jeff in the world premiere production of Which Way to the Stage off-Broadway.

== Personal life ==
Jenkins was born and raised in New York City.

== Filmography ==
=== Film ===
Year	Title	Role
2012	Watching TV with the Red Chinese	Boy in Gladiator Costume
2014	Fort Tilden	Ashley
2014	You Must Be Joking	Paul
2014	The Dark Side	Bill
2015	Those People	Dracula
2017	The Mess He Made	Jude
2019	Plus One	Nick
2023	Cat Person	Todd

=== Television ===
Year	Title	Role
2009	The Middle	Sue's friend
2011	Gossip Girl	Keith's Assistant
2012	30 Rock	U.N. Receptionist
2012	Anderson Live	Himself
2013	High Maintenance	Max
2014–2016	The Mysteries of Laura	Max Carnegie
2015	Orange Is the New Black	Drew
2016	High Maintenance	Max
2019–2022	Dead to Me	Christopher Doyle
2020	Social Distance	Shane
2021	Special	Tanner
2024	Dead Boy Detectives	Kingham

== Awards and nominations ==
Year	Award	Category	Work	Result	Ref
2012	Drama Desk Awards	Outstanding Play	Unnatural Acts	Nominated	
2021	Screen Actors Guild Awards	Outstanding Performance by an Ensemble in a Comedy Series	Dead to Me	Nominated	
