= The Challenge: Ride or Dies =

38th season of the reality television series

Ride or Dies
- Season 38
- Presented by: T. J. Lavin
- No. of contestants: 34 (Note: Excluding James Simon, Aneesa Ferreira's initial partner, who was briefly seen in the premiere but left the competition for unknown reasons and was not listed in the cast release.)
- Winners: Devin Walker-Molaghan; Tori Deal
- Location: Buenos Aires, Argentina
- No. of episodes: 21 (including the two-part Reunion special)

Release
- Original network: MTV
- Original release: October 12, 2022 – March 1, 2023

Season chronology
- ← Previous; Spies, Lies & Allies Next → Battle for a New Champion

The Challenge: Ride or Dies is the 38th season of the MTV reality competition series The Challenge, featuring alumni from The Real World, Road Rules, The Challenge, Are You the One?, Big Brother, Ex on the Beach, Survivor (Turkey and U.S.), Love Island (UK and U.S.), Ultimate Beastmaster, Prince Charming, The Mole Germany, Beauty & The Nerd (Germany) and Exatlón Estados Unidos competing for a share at a $1 million prize. The season premiered on October 12, 2022, preceded by a launch special titled "Ready to Ride" which aired on October 10, 2022.

== Format ==
Ride or Dies features a daily challenge, a selection process and an elimination round. This season had players competing in teams of two with their "Ride or Die," a partner they chose before the season began.

The format for episodes 1–8 and 15–16 is as follows:

- Daily Challenge: Teams compete in a daily challenge where the winning team is immune from elimination and selects four teams to interrogate and potentially compete in the elimination round.
- Eliminations (The Zone): The daily challenge winners must select one of the teams they interrogated to compete in the elimination round. The three unselected interrogated teams then participate in the "Draw" to determine the second team for the elimination round. The winners remain in the game while the losers are eliminated.

In episode 9, the format changed and no elimination was held after the "Haul or Nothing" challenge. Instead, the winners were appointed as team captains and split each "Ride or Die" pair to form two teams of eight. The format of the game from episodes 10–14 is as follows:

- Daily Challenge: Teams compete in a daily challenge where the winning team is immune from elimination and interrogates all players of the designated gender from the losing team.
- Eliminations (The Zone): The winning team individually vote for one interrogated player to compete in the elimination. The unselected interrogated players then participate in the Draw to determine the second player to compete in the elimination round. The winner remains in the game while the loser is eliminated from the main competition. However, unbeknownst to the remaining players, they still have a chance of later re-entering the competition if their Ride or Die is still in.

At the end of episode 14, the team phase concluded and contestants reunited with their Ride or Die. Each eliminated contestant during the team phase returned and also reunited with their Ride or Die if they were still in the competition. Each reunited pair who had one team member previously eliminated then had to compete in a two-part elimination round. The pair that lost the second elimination were permanently eliminated before the game reverted back to its original format.

Twists

- The Draw: To determine the second team for the elimination round, the three unselected interrogated teams must each pull a covered dagger out of a stone. The team that pulls the dagger marked "safe" is safe and selects one of the remaining two teams to save, sending the other to compete in the elimination round against the team chosen by the daily challenge winners. From episodes 10-14, players took part in the draw as individuals instead of teams; if only two players partake in the Draw, the player who pulls the safe dagger is saved while the remaining player automatically participates in the elimination round.

== Contestants ==
Male contestants	Original season	Finish
Devin Walker-Molaghan	Are You the One? 3	Winner
Johnny "Bananas" Devenanzio (Note: Bananas & Nany joined the competition after the "You Move I Move" elimination at the end of episode 1.)	The Real World: Key West	Runner-up
Jordan Wiseley (Note: Aneesa & Jordan joined the competition after the "Memory Lane" elimination at the end of episode 2.)	The Real World: Portland	Third place
Horacio Gutiérrez (Note: Prior to the "Bolas for Blood" challenge in episode 1, it was announced that Kaycee & Kenny had left the game. Their departure was not shown on screen; however, they revealed in a post-season interview that it was due to a positive COVID-19 test. Emmy & Nam and Horacio & Olivia joined the competition as replacements.)	Exatlón Estados Unidos 5	Fourth place (Note: Olivia was medically removed from the Final Challenge, after severely injuring her face at Station 3, in a slingshot mishap in which the ball she was firing ricocheted and struck her face. Horacio was disqualified as a result of being Olivia's partner.)
Faysal Shafaat	Big Brother 20	Episode 16
Chauncey Palmer	—N/a	Episode 15
Kenny Clark (Note: Prior to the "Balancing Act" challenge in episode 2, it was announced that Emmy withdrew from the competition; Nam was disqualified as a result of being Emmy's partner. After being cleared to compete, Kaycee & Kenny re-entered the competition as replacements for Emmy & Nam during the challenge.)	—N/a	Episode 15
Nelson Thomas	Are You the One? 3	Episode 12
Jay Starrett	Survivor: Millennials vs. Gen X	Episode 8
Darrell Taylor (Note: Darrell & Veronica joined the competition after the "Double Decker" elimination at the end of episode 3.)	Road Rules: Campus Crawl	Episode 7
Jakk Maddox	Ex on the Beach: Peak of Love	Episode 6
Kim Tränka	Prince Charming 3	Episode 5
Tommy Bracco	Big Brother 21	Episode 4
Johnny Middlebrooks	Love Island USA 2	Episode 3
Turabi "Turbo" Çamkıran	Survivor Turkey 8	Episode 2
Nam Vo	Ultimate Beastmaster 1	Episode 2
Sam Bird	Love Island UK 4	Episode 1

Female contestants	Original season	Finish
Tori Deal	Are You the One? 4	Winner
Nany González	The Real World: Las Vegas (2011)	Runner-up
Aneesa Ferreira	The Real World: Chicago	Third place
Olivia Kaiser	Love Island USA 3	Fourth place
Moriah Jadea	—N/a	Episode 16
Amber Borzotra	Big Brother 16	Episode 15
Kaycee Clark	Big Brother 20	Episode 15
Nurys Mateo	Are You the One? 6	Episode 12
Michele Fitzgerald	Survivor: Kaôh Rōng	Episode 8
Veronica Portillo	Road Rules: Semester at Sea	Episode 7
Laurel Stucky	The Challenge: Fresh Meat II	Episode 6
Colleen Schneider	The Mole Germany	Episode 5
Analyse Talavera	Big Brother 21	Episode 4
Ravyn Rochelle	—N/a	Episode 3
Tamara Alfaro	—N/a	Episode 2
Emmy Russ	Beauty & The Nerd 2	Episode 2
Kailah Casillas-Bird	Real World: Go Big or Go Home	Episode 1

=== Teams ===
Team	Male partner	Female partner	Relationship
Amber & Chauncey	Chauncey Palmer	Amber Borzotra	Dating
Analyse & Tommy	Tommy Bracco	Analyse Talavera	Friends/castmates
Aneesa & Jordan	Jordan Wiseley	Aneesa Ferreira	Friends/castmates
Bananas & Nany	Johnny "Bananas" Devenanzio	Nany Gonzalez	Friends/exes/castmates
Colleen & Kim	Kim Tränka	Colleen Schneider	Friends
Darrell & Veronica	Darrell Taylor	Veronica Portillo	Friends/castmates
Devin & Tori	Devin Walker-Molaghan	Tori Deal	Friends/castmates
Emmy & Nam	Nam Vo	Emmy Russ	Shared talent agency
Faysal & Moriah	Faysal Shafaat	Moriah Jadea	Friends
Horacio & Olivia	Horacio Gutiérrez	Olivia Kaiser	Friends
Jakk & Laurel	Jakk Maddox	Laurel Stucky	Friends/castmates
Jay & Michele	Jay Starrett	Michele Fitzgerald	Friends/exes
Johnny & Ravyn	Johnny Middlebrooks	Ravyn Rochelle	Friends
Kailah & Sam	Sam Bird	Kailah Casillas-Bird	Married
Kaycee & Kenny	Kenny Clark	Kaycee Clark	Siblings
Nelson & Nurys	Nelson Thomas	Nurys Mateo	Friends/exes/castmates
Tamara & Turbo	Turabi "Turbo" Çamkıran	Tamara Alfaro	Dating

=== Draft ===
The winners of the episode 9 "Haul or Nothing" challenge, Faysal & Moriah, were made team captains and drafted the remaining pairs into two teams of eight as part of the format change. Challengers in gray cells indicate they were designated their team after the other team captain chose their partner.

Round
Round	Faysal's team	Moriah's team
Captain	Faysal	Moriah
1	Kaycee	Kenny
2	Aneesa	Jordan
3	Bananas	Nany
4	Chauncey	Amber
5	Nelson	Nurys
6	Olivia	Horacio
7	Tori	Devin

Team colors

Episode	Challenge	Team name	
Episode	Challenge	Faysal's team	Moriah's team
10	Last Life	Pink Team	Yellow Team
11	Spin Class	Orange Team	Green Team
12	Chopper Drop	Blue Team	Yellow Team
13	Blind Faith	Pink Team	Yellow Team
14	Takes Two to Tango	Pink Team	Blue Team

== Gameplay ==
=== Challenge games ===
- Bolas for Blood: Teams must solve three math questions using their biographical information, then search a mud pit for numbered bolas and attach them on chains to form the answers. The first team to correctly answer all three questions and bring their bolas to the finish line wins.
  - Winners: Johnny & Ravyn
- Balancing Act: Played one team at a time. Team members swim and climb a ladder up separate shipping containers suspended above water. They must then use a rope to swing to a slanted platform at the center, then distribute their weight to pivot and level out the platform. Teams are disqualified if a team member falls into the water. The team with the fastest time wins.
  - Winners: Bananas & Nany
- Build Me Up: Played in two heats. Teams must transfer six barrels across a field, stacking them to reach and set off flares atop three stations along the way. The team that sets off all three flares and transfers all six barrels to the finish line in the fastest time wins.
  - Winners: Faysal & Moriah
- Hold On for Me: Played in five heats. One team member begins suspended off the side of a building and must hang onto a bar for as long as possible. When they are about to drop, their partner must leap off a ledge and launch them towards a flag hanging behind them. Teams are disqualified if they are unable to grab the flag. The team that hangs on the longest, and is able to grab their flag, wins.
  - Winners: Nelson & Nurys
- Royal Relay: Played in two heats. Team members alternate turns swimming and rowing a boat to collect four crown pieces floating in a lake, then use them to assemble a crown. The team with the fastest time wins and also receives a cash prize of $5,000 each.
  - Winners: Jay & Michele
- Down the Line: Played in two heats, teams must dig in their marked zone for two bags of puzzle pieces. Once teams find the first bag, one team member races to the end of a lake and spins a crank to extend the distance their partner can later zip line. After finding the second bag, the second team member must zip line into a lake and swim the remaining distance to reunite with their partner. Teams must then use the puzzle pieces to solve a word puzzle. The team with the fastest time wins.
  - Winners: Jay & Michele
- Peaking Blinders: Teams race down a path to a pattern covered by blinds. There, one team member balances one-footed on a narrow pole to open the blinds and reveal the pattern for their partner to memorize. After the team member balancing falls off, teams must return to the start and attempt to replicate their pattern on their board, repeating this process until they correctly recreate the entire pattern. The first team to finish wins.
  - Winners: Nelson & Nurys
- Double Trouble: One team member begins harnessed to the side of a speeding truck. They must traverse four cars speeding alongside the truck and collect a key from their partner in the last car before returning the key to their station, repeating this process for all four keys. The team with the fastest time wins.
  - Winners: Aneesa & Jordan
- Haul or Nothing: Teams carry a heavy plank and undergo a six-mile race, completing three checkpoints along the way. At the first checkpoint, teams use their plank and three barrels to cross a field without touching the ground before transferring sandbags to the second checkpoint. At the second checkpoint, teams can place their sandbags on a trailing team's sled to sabotage them, before pulling their own sled across a field and stacking four cubes on top so each side shows four unique symbols. Once complete, teams transfer six tyres with cities labelled on them to the third checkpoint. At the third checkpoint, teams must transfer the tyres over a wall and arrange the cities from north to south before proceeding to the finish line. The first team to cross the finish line wins and becomes team captains as part of a format change for the season.
  - Winners: Faysal & Moriah
- Last Life: Inspired by the film Puss in Boots: The Last Wish, each team begins with eight lives. One player at a time from each team face off on a balance beam and attempts to push their opponent into the water below. Each time a team member loses their matchup, they are eliminated from the challenge and their team loses a life. The team that diminishes all their opponent's lives wins and also receive invitations to the world premiere of Puss in Boots: The Last Wish.
  - Winners: Pink Team
- Spin Class: Each team begin strapped to a giant wheel. After each spin, the team member the wheel lands on must answer a trivia question. If they answer correctly, they earn a point for their team; however, their team's wheel will spin for 30 more seconds if they answer incorrectly. The first team to score five points wins.
  - Winners: Orange Team
- Chopper Drop: Six team members begin hanging onto a bar attached to a helicopter flying over a lake. As the helicopter flies over six targets, they must drop into a target to earn score points before swimming the remaining distance to a platform in the middle of the lake. Smaller targets are worth more points and only two team members may drop through each target. Additionally, teams with greater than six members must have their remaining players swim to the platform from a designated point. The team that scores the most points wins, with ties broken based on swim time.
  - Winners: Yellow Team
- Blind Faith: Each team must select one or two members to compete in four unrevealed challenges, based on cryptic symbols representing each challenge (target, puzzle, memory and bungee). The team with the fastest cumulative time for all four challenges wins.
  - Target: One team member must use a slingshot to fire balls and hit three out of seven targets to have their time stopped. However, after each miss they must drink a foul-tasting smoothie before they can continue firing.
  - Puzzle: Two team members must transfer eight puzzle pieces across a field to their puzzle board and use them to solve a puzzle to have their time stopped.
  - Memory: One team member must run to an answer key, memorize it, and describe it to a second team member at the middle of a 300-foot field. The second team member must then replicate the key using tiles at the opposite end of the field to have their time stopped.
  - Bungee: Two team members begin attached to a bungee cord. They must both run towards and hold onto a bar simultaneously, as the resistance from the bungee cord pulls them back, to have their time stopped.
  - Winners: Pink Team
- Takes Two to Tango: Two team members at a time begin harnessed on the side of a building and must cross a balance beam containing several obstacles before returning to the start. At each circular obstacle on the beam, they must also spin around before continuing. There is a ten-minute time limit before pairs time out and are dropped from the beam. The intra-team pair with the fastest time wins the challenge for their team.
  - Winners: Pink Team
- Runaway Ride: Played one team at a time, teams begin in a bus filled with dozens of colored balls. As the bus swerves around a racetrack, teams must study a pattern printed on a board along the track, then recreate it by finding and arranging the required balls in the bus. The team with the most correctly-slotted balls in the fastest time wins.
  - Winners: Bananas & Nany
- Frozen Senseless: One team member must feel through a covered box at one end of a course for three cubes with shapes on each face. They must then meet their partner at the middle of the course and describe the pattern to them so they can assemble the cubes using puzzle pieces at the other end of the course. However, teams must immerse themselves in an ice bath while communicating the descriptions. The first team to correctly assemble their cubes wins.
  - Winners: Devin & Tori

=== Zone games ===
- You Move I Move: Teams must stand on and tilt two platforms to maneuver five balls through a table maze. The first team to move all five balls to the end of the maze wins.
  - Played by: Devin & Tori vs. Kailah & Sam
- Memory Lane: Team members alternate turns flipping over two tiles at a time from their board of covered tiles. If the symbols on the tiles match, they can place them face up, otherwise they must leave the tiles face down. The first team to uncover all 24 tiles wins.
  - Played by: Horacio & Olivia vs. Tamara & Turbo
- Double Decker: Team members begin on different levels of a double-decker hallway across from their opponents. The team members on the lower level must push a sliding bar to their opponent's side of the hallway while their opponent tries to do the same. Once one team member achieves this, the two players on the upper level repeat this process, with the teammate of the lower level's winner being released one second earlier. The first player on the upper level to push the bar to their opponent's side wins the round for their team. The first team to win two rounds wins.
  - Played by: Horacio & Olivia vs. Johnny & Ravyn
- Flipping Wasted: One team member begins strapped to a board above a mud pit. Their partner must pull the board upright so they can reach and solve a puzzle. The first team to solve the puzzle wins.
  - Played by: Analyse & Tommy vs. Colleen & Kim
- Give Me Some Slack: Team members begin on opposite sides of a climbing wall. The team member on the colored side must describe the design of the wall to their partner, who climbs their side to collect miniature wall pieces and recreate the design on a board. Additionally, team member's harnesses are connected so that each time one team member climbs, their partner descends and vice versa. The first team to correctly replicate their wall wins.
  - Played by: Colleen & Kim vs. Jakk & Laurel
- In Your Face: Teams must transfer cinder blocks onto a box to release a set of balls. One team member must then throw the balls at ten targets of their opponent's faces while their partner tries to block their opponent's shots. The first team to hit all ten targets wins.
  - Played by: Aneesa & Jordan vs. Jakk & Laurel
- Deep Web: Team members alternate turns descending a rope net tower to collect a puzzle piece at the bottom before climbing back to the top. After collecting all eight pieces, the first team to solve the puzzle wins.
  - Played by: Amber & Chauncey vs. Darrell & Veronica
- Spun Out: One team member begins inside a giant wheel. They must roll the wheel back and forth so their partner, who is strapped to the outside of the wheel, can rearrange puzzle pieces on poles along the track to solve a puzzle similar to the Tower of Hanoi. The first team to solve the puzzle wins.
  - Played by: Horacio & Olivia vs. Jay & Michele
- Breaking Barriers: Players must use tools (axe, bolt cutters or wrench) to break through varying walls enclosed in a hallway. The first player to break through all their walls and push the button in the middle of the hallway wins.
  - Played by: Horacio vs. Kenny
- Pato Brawl: Players begin at the center of the Zone with both hands on a pato ball. The first player to wrestle the ball out of their opponent's hands two out of three times wins.
  - Played by: Amber vs. Nurys
- Spearheaded: Players untangle chains enclosed in a cell to access nine spears which they must pull through the drywall of the cell to release. The first player to pull out all nine spears and place them at the finish line wins.
  - Played by: Faysal vs. Nelson
- I Can See: Players must lift a heavy wall to reveal six scrambled words and unscramble them using letter tiles at their board. The first player to unscramble all six words, and push the button on the side of the board to verify their answer, wins.
  - Played by: Moriah vs. Nany
- Balls In: Played across three rounds; each round, players play both offense and defense. The offense player attempts to deposit a ball into a goal at the center of a ring while the defense player attempts to stop them by blocking them and knocking the ball out of bounds. Players then switch positions before the end of the round and repeat this process. The player with the most goals scored at the end of the third round wins.
  - Played by: Horacio vs. Jordan
- Don't Let Me Down: Teams must roll a heavy cylinder past a marked line of a steep ramp and hold it there for one minute. The first team to finish wins while the losing teams must compete in the following elimination round.
  - Played by: Aneesa & Jordan vs. Faysal & Moriah vs. Kaycee & Kenny
- Knot So Fast: Teams have 20 minutes to create as many knots as they can using a rope within a cubic structure. After those 20 minutes are up, teams switch positions and must untie their opponent's knots. The first team to untie their opponent's knots and drag the rope across the finish line wins.
  - Played by: Aneesa & Jordan vs. Kaycee & Kenny
- Rumble Tumble: Played in male and female rounds, players begin tethered to their opponent. They must knock over their three stacks of blocks at the boundary of the Zone, while their opponent tries to do the same, to win the round for their team. The first team to win two rounds wins.
  - Played by: Amber & Chauncey vs. Aneesa & Jordan
- Bridge It: Each team member must use three rungs to ascend a rope bridge to the top of a tower. Each time they drop a rung or fall off, they must restart. The first team to have both team members reach the top of the tower wins.
  - Played by: Bananas & Nany vs. Faysal & Moriah

=== Final Challenge ===
The final four teams compete in a 100-hour Final Challenge, which begins with teams driving themselves to a campsite for the Overnight Stage of day one.

Day one

- Overnight Stage: Teams must collectively cycle 100 kilometres (62 mi) on stationary bikes to reveal a code which unlocks a trunk of camping supplies, before spending the night at the campsite.

Day two

Teams race to complete a series of stations. The order that teams finish the day's checkpoints determines the order they depart the following day.

- Station 1: Each team must throw ten bolas onto a structure from behind a line. After landing each second bola, they can assign a foul-tasting smoothie to another team. Once teams land all ten bolas, they must drink all the smoothies they currently have before proceeding to the next station.
- Station 2: Teams must transfer 16 tyres labelled with the names of eliminated contestants from the season, one at a time, down a one-kilometre (0.62 mi) track and arrange them on a pole in the order they were eliminated before proceeding to the next station.
- Station 3: Teams must use a slingshot to fire balls and hit two distant targets before proceeding to the next station. The first team to complete this may also sabotage a trailing team by assigning them two additional targets to hit before they can continue.
  - Eliminated: Horacio & Olivia (4th place – $38,000 awarded each) (Note: After winning the Final Challenge, Devin & Tori awarded each of the six other finalists $38,000 from their $1 million winnings.)
- Station 4: Teams swim through a swamp to collect bags of puzzle pieces at two platforms. After returning the puzzle pieces to their station, teams must then run down a path to view and memorize an answer key before recreating the key at their station using the puzzle pieces. Once complete, teams can proceed to the next station at a campsite.
- Station 5 and Overnight Stage: Teams must solve a geometric puzzle before spending the night at the campsite.

Day three

- Station 6: Teams must push a car down a track before proceeding to the next station at a campsite.
- Station 7 and Overnight Stage: Teams must consume two plates of bread rolls, a plate of plain spaghetti and two large bowls of ice cream before spending the night at the campsite.

Note: Day three contained two additional unaired challenges. Firstly, one team member at a time had to squat in a picture frame-like structure until their team completed one consecutive hour, with team members able to swap places as desired. Secondly, teams had to roll a cylinder up a steep ramp and hold it there for one hour.

Day four

- First stage: One team at a time, in the order decided by the winning team from the previous day, boards a helicopter as it flies over a field of targets. They must launch chalk bombs at the targets, attempting to hit as many as possible. The winning team from the previous day receive 25 chalk bombs to launch, second receives 20 bombs and third receives 15. The team that hit the most targets wins the ability to select the departure order for the next stage.
- Second stage: Teams choose one of two paths in a dark corn maze to follow to one of two campsites. Once all teams arrive at a campsite, a distant "Finale Zone" illuminates, which teams must race through the maze towards, departing in the order they arrived. The first team to arrive at the Zone are immune while the remaining two teams must participate in an Instant Elimination.
  - Winners: Devin & Tori
- Instant Elimination ("Balls In"): Played in male and female rounds in a revisit of the "Balls In" elimination. Each round, team members of the designated gender play both offense and defense. The offense player has one attempt to deposit a ball into at the center of a ring while the defense player attempts to stop them by blocking them and knocking the ball out of bounds. Players then switch roles and repeat the process before the end of the round. The first team to score three balls wins while the losing team is eliminated from the Final Challenge.
  - Played by: Aneesa & Jordan vs. Bananas & Nany
  - Eliminated: Aneesa & Jordan (3rd place – $38,000 awarded each)

Day five

- Level Up: The final two teams compete in a challenge at the Finale Zone to determine the champions of the season. Teams must complete four tasks to progress through four rooms, or "levels", in a hallway to reach a lever at the middle. The first team to pull the lever are declared the winners of Ride or Dies and receive $1 million.
  - Level 1: Teams must pull out nine spears enclosed in the drywall of the room to reach the next level.
  - Level 2: Teams must remove 200 cinderblocks from the room and use them to solve a puzzle outside the hallway before proceeding to the next level.
  - Level 3: Teams must use a battering ram to break through a wall then dig through a room filled with sand to reach the next level.
  - Level 4: Teams must remove chains tangled in the room to reach the lever in the middle of the hallway.

Final results

- Winners: Devin & Tori – $772,000 retained ($386,000 each)
- Runners-up: Bananas & Nany – $38,000 awarded each

== Game summary ==
Episode		Gender	Winners	Zone contestants			Zone game	Zone outcome	
#	Challenge	Gender	Winners	Winners' pick	Saved at Draw	Not saved	Zone game	Winner(s)	Loser(s)
1	Bolas for Blood		Johnny & Ravyn	Kailah & Sam	**Colleen & Kim**	Devin & Tori	You Move I Move	Devin & Tori	Kailah & Sam
1	Bolas for Blood		Johnny & Ravyn	Kailah & Sam	Jakk & Laurel	Devin & Tori	You Move I Move	Devin & Tori	Kailah & Sam
2	Balancing Act		Bananas & Nany	Tamara & Turbo	**Jay & Michele**	Horacio & Olivia	Memory Lane	Horacio & Olivia	Tamara & Turbo
2	Balancing Act		Bananas & Nany	Tamara & Turbo	Johnny & Ravyn	Horacio & Olivia	Memory Lane	Horacio & Olivia	Tamara & Turbo
3	Build Me Up		Faysal & Moriah	Johnny & Ravyn	**Analyse & Tommy**	Horacio & Olivia	Double Decker	Horacio & Olivia	Johnny & Ravyn
3	Build Me Up		Faysal & Moriah	Johnny & Ravyn	Colleen & Kim	Horacio & Olivia	Double Decker	Horacio & Olivia	Johnny & Ravyn
4	Hold On for Me		Nelson & Nurys	Analyse & Tommy	**Horacio & Olivia**	Colleen & Kim	Flipping Wasted	Colleen & Kim	Analyse & Tommy
4	Hold On for Me		Nelson & Nurys	Analyse & Tommy	Darrell & Veronica	Colleen & Kim	Flipping Wasted	Colleen & Kim	Analyse & Tommy
5	Royal Relay		Jay & Michele	Jakk & Laurel	**Darrell & Veronica**	Colleen & Kim	Give Me Some Slack	Jakk & Laurel	Colleen & Kim
5	Royal Relay		Jay & Michele	Jakk & Laurel	Aneesa & Jordan	Colleen & Kim	Give Me Some Slack	Jakk & Laurel	Colleen & Kim
6	Down the Line		Jay & Michele	Aneesa & Jordan	**Bananas & Nany**	Jakk & Laurel	In Your Face	Aneesa & Jordan	Jakk & Laurel
6	Down the Line		Jay & Michele	Aneesa & Jordan	Kaycee & Kenny	Jakk & Laurel	In Your Face	Aneesa & Jordan	Jakk & Laurel
7	Peaking Blinders		Nelson & Nurys	Amber & Chauncey	**Bananas & Nany**	Darrell & Veronica	Deep Web	Amber & Chauncey	Darrell & Veronica
7	Peaking Blinders		Nelson & Nurys	Amber & Chauncey	Aneesa & Jordan	Darrell & Veronica	Deep Web	Amber & Chauncey	Darrell & Veronica
8	Double Trouble		Aneesa & Jordan	Jay & Michele	**Nelson & Nurys**	Horacio & Olivia	Spun Out	Horacio & Olivia	Jay & Michele
8	Double Trouble		Aneesa & Jordan	Jay & Michele	Faysal & Moriah	Horacio & Olivia	Spun Out	Horacio & Olivia	Jay & Michele
9	Haul or Nothing		Faysal & Moriah						
10	Last Life	Male	Pink Team	Horacio	**Devin**	Kenny	Breaking Barriers	Horacio	Kenny
10	Last Life	Male	Pink Team	Horacio	Jordan	Kenny	Breaking Barriers	Horacio	Kenny
11	Spin Class	Female	Orange Team	Nurys	**Moriah**	Amber	Pato Brawl	Amber	Nurys
11	Spin Class	Female	Orange Team	Nurys	Nany	Amber	Pato Brawl	Amber	Nurys
12	Chopper Drop	Male	Yellow Team	Faysal	**Chauncey**	Nelson	Spearheaded	Faysal	Nelson
12	Chopper Drop	Male	Yellow Team	Faysal	Bananas	Nelson	Spearheaded	Faysal	Nelson
13	Blind Faith	Female	Pink Team	Moriah	**Amber**	Nany	I Can See	Nany	Moriah
14	Takes Two to Tango	Male	Pink Team	Horacio	**Devin**	Jordan	Balls In	Horacio	Jordan
14/15	(Note: As their Ride or Dies survived the team phase of the competition, eliminated contestants Jordan, Kenny and Moriah returned and rejoined their partners at the end of episode 14. These reunited pairs then had to compete in a two-part elimination round. The winners of each part remained in the competition while the losers were permanently eliminated.)						Don't Let Me Down	Faysal & Moriah	Aneesa & Jordan
14/15	(Note: As their Ride or Dies survived the team phase of the competition, eliminated contestants Jordan, Kenny and Moriah returned and rejoined their partners at the end of episode 14. These reunited pairs then had to compete in a two-part elimination round. The winners of each part remained in the competition while the losers were permanently eliminated.)						Don't Let Me Down	Faysal & Moriah	Kaycee & Kenny
14/15	(Note: As their Ride or Dies survived the team phase of the competition, eliminated contestants Jordan, Kenny and Moriah returned and rejoined their partners at the end of episode 14. These reunited pairs then had to compete in a two-part elimination round. The winners of each part remained in the competition while the losers were permanently eliminated.)						Knot So Fast	Aneesa & Jordan	Kaycee & Kenny
15	Runaway Ride		Bananas & Nany	Amber & Chauncey	**Horacio & Olivia**	Aneesa & Jordan	Rumble Tumble	Aneesa & Jordan	Amber & Chauncey
15	Runaway Ride		Bananas & Nany	Amber & Chauncey	Devin & Tori	Aneesa & Jordan	Rumble Tumble	Aneesa & Jordan	Amber & Chauncey
16	Frozen Senseless		Devin & Tori	Faysal & Moriah	**Horacio & Olivia**	Bananas & Nany	Bridge It	Bananas & Nany	Faysal & Moriah
16	Frozen Senseless		Devin & Tori	Faysal & Moriah	Aneesa & Jordan	Bananas & Nany	Bridge It	Bananas & Nany	Faysal & Moriah
17/18/19	Final Challenge		**Devin & Tori**	2nd: Bananas & Nany; 3rd: Aneesa & Jordan; 4th: Horacio & Olivia					

Bold indicates the contestant or team pulled the safe dagger, and saved a second contestant or team (where applicable)

=== Elimination progress ===
Contestants	Episodes																		
Contestants	1	2	3	4	5	6	7	8	9	10	11	12	13	14	14/15		15	16	Finale
Devin	ELIM	SAFE	SAFE	SAFE	SAFE	SAFE	SAFE	SAFE	SAFE	DRAW	SAFE	WIN	SAFE	DRAW	SAFE	SAFE	SAVE	WIN	**WINNER**
Tori	ELIM	SAFE	SAFE	SAFE	SAFE	SAFE	SAFE	SAFE	SAFE	WIN	WIN	SAFE	WIN	WIN	SAFE	SAFE	SAVE	WIN	**WINNER**
Bananas	N/A	WIN	SAFE	SAFE	SAFE	DRAW	DRAW	SAFE	SAFE	WIN	WIN	SAVE	WIN	WIN	SAFE	SAFE	WIN	ELIM	**SECOND**
Nany	N/A	WIN	SAFE	SAFE	SAFE	DRAW	DRAW	SAFE	SAFE	SAFE	SAVE	WIN	ELIM	SAFE	SAFE	SAFE	WIN	ELIM	**SECOND**
Aneesa	N/A		SAFE	SAFE	SAVE	ELIM	SAVE	WIN	SAFE	WIN	WIN	SAFE	WIN	WIN	LOSE	ELIM	ELIM	SAVE	**THIRD**
Jordan	N/A		SAFE	SAFE	SAVE	ELIM	SAVE	WIN	SAFE	SAVE	SAFE	WIN	SAFE	OUT	LOSE	ELIM	ELIM	SAVE	**THIRD**
Horacio	SAFE	ELIM	ELIM	DRAW	SAFE	SAFE	SAFE	ELIM	SAFE	ELIM	SAFE	WIN	SAFE	ELIM	SAFE	SAFE	DRAW	DRAW	DQ
Olivia	SAFE	ELIM	ELIM	DRAW	SAFE	SAFE	SAFE	ELIM	SAFE	WIN	WIN	SAFE	WIN	WIN	SAFE	SAFE	DRAW	DRAW	MED
Faysal	SAFE	SAFE	WIN	SAFE	SAFE	SAFE	SAFE	SAVE	WON	WIN	WIN	ELIM	WIN	WIN	ELIM	SAFE	SAFE	OUT	
Moriah	SAFE	SAFE	WIN	SAFE	SAFE	SAFE	SAFE	SAVE	WON	SAFE	DRAW	WIN	OUT		ELIM	SAFE	SAFE	OUT	
Amber	SAFE	SAFE	SAFE	SAFE	SAFE	SAFE	ELIM	SAFE	SAFE	SAFE	ELIM	WIN	DRAW	SAFE	SAFE	SAFE	OUT		
Chauncey	SAFE	SAFE	SAFE	SAFE	SAFE	SAFE	ELIM	SAFE	SAFE	WIN	WIN	DRAW	WIN	WIN	SAFE	SAFE	OUT		
Kaycee	MED	SAFE	SAFE	SAFE	SAFE	SAVE	SAFE	SAFE	SAFE	WIN	WIN	SAFE	WIN	WIN	LOSE	OUT			
Kenny	MED	SAFE	SAFE	SAFE	SAFE	SAVE	SAFE	SAFE	SAFE	OUT					LOSE	OUT			
Nelson	SAFE	SAFE	SAFE	WIN	SAFE	SAFE	WIN	DRAW	SAFE	WIN	WIN	OUT							
Nurys	SAFE	SAFE	SAFE	WIN	SAFE	SAFE	WIN	DRAW	SAFE	SAFE	OUT								
Jay	SAFE	DRAW	SAFE	SAFE	WIN	WIN	SAFE	OUT											
Michele	SAFE	DRAW	SAFE	SAFE	WIN	WIN	SAFE	OUT											
Darrell	N/A			SAVE	DRAW	SAFE	OUT												
Veronica	N/A			SAVE	DRAW	SAFE	OUT												
Jakk	SAVE	SAFE	SAFE	SAFE	ELIM	OUT													
Laurel	SAVE	SAFE	SAFE	SAFE	ELIM	OUT													
Colleen	DRAW	SAFE	SAVE	ELIM	OUT														
Kim	DRAW	SAFE	SAVE	ELIM	OUT														
Analyse	SAFE	SAFE	DRAW	OUT															
Tommy	SAFE	SAFE	DRAW	OUT															
Johnny	WIN	SAVE	OUT																
Ravyn	WIN	SAVE	OUT																
Tamara	SAFE	OUT																	
Turbo	SAFE	OUT																	
Nam	SAFE	DQ																	
Emmy	SAFE	QUIT																	
Kailah	OUT																		
Sam	OUT																		

Competition key
The contestant finished the Final Challenge and won
The contestant finished the Final Challenge and lost
The contestant was eliminated during the Final Challenge
The contestant or team won the daily challenge and was immune from elimination
The contestant won the daily challenge and got to choose the teams for the next phase
The contestant was safe from elimination
The contestant or team pulled the safe dagger at the Draw
The contestant was nominated for the Zone and saved at the Draw by the team who chose the safe dagger
The contestant won the elimination round
The contestant lost the elimination round and had to compete in the next elimination round
The contestant lost the elimination round and was eliminated
The contestant was medically removed from the competition
The contestant withdrew from the competition
The contestant was disqualified from the competition

== Voting progress ==
Winning team's nomination	Horacio; 7 of 8 votes	Nurys; 5 of 8 votes	Faysal; 3 of 6 votes	Moriah; 4 of 7 votes	Horacio; 4 of 7 votes
Draw Pick	Kenny; Not saved	Amber; Not saved	Nelson; Not saved	Nany; Not saved	Jordan; Not saved
Voter	Episode				
Voter	10	11	12	13	14
Devin			Faysal		
Tori	Horacio	Nurys		Moriah	Horacio
Bananas	Horacio	Nurys		Amber	Horacio
Nany			Nelson		
Aneesa	Horacio	Nurys		Moriah	Horacio
Jordan			Faysal		
Horacio			Faysal		
Olivia	Kenny	Nany		Nany	Devin
Faysal	Horacio	Amber		Nany	Jordan
Moriah			Chauncey		
Amber			Nelson		
Chauncey	Horacio	Nurys		Moriah	Jordan
Kaycee	Horacio	Nurys		Moriah	Horacio
Kenny					
Nelson	Horacio	Moriah			
Nurys					

== Episodes ==
No. overall	No. in season	Title	Original release date	US viewers (millions)
508	1	"Don't Die for Me, Argentina"	October 12, 2022	0.42
509	2	"Friend or Faux"	October 19, 2022	0.42
510	3	"A Bumpy Ride"	October 26, 2022	0.49
511	4	"O'liv'n on the Edge"	November 2, 2022	0.46
512	5	"Get Rich or Ride or Die Tryin'"	November 9, 2022	0.47
513	6	"Come Michele or High Water"	November 16, 2022	0.50
514	7	"Deep Web"	November 23, 2022	0.47
515	8	"Born to Ride or Die"	November 30, 2022	0.52
516	9	"Split Decision"	December 7, 2022	0.56
517	10	"Dancing on My Own"	December 14, 2022	0.56
518	11	"Nelly: Ride (or Die) Wit Me"	December 21, 2022	0.66
519	12	"Frenemy of the State"	December 28, 2022	0.55
520	13	"Blind Faith"	January 4, 2023	0.52
521	14	"Terrorist of Love"	January 11, 2023	0.56
522	15	"Knot a Problem"	January 18, 2023	0.64
523	16	"Friends or Froze"	January 25, 2023	0.64
524	17	"Riders on the Storm"	February 1, 2023	0.55
525	18	"The Hours"	February 8, 2023	0.67
526	19	"The End of the Ride"	February 15, 2023	0.67

=== Reunion special ===
The two-part reunion special aired on February 22 and March 1, 2023 and was hosted by entertainment personality Maria Menounos. Cast members attended in London, England.
