= 4th Man Out =

2015 film directed by Andrew Nackman

- Theatrical release poster
- Directed by: Andrew Nackman
- Written by: Aaron Dancik
- Produced by: Lauren Avinoam; Lauren Hogarth; Jed Mellick
- Starring: Evan Todd; Parker Young; Chord Overstreet; Jon Gabrus; Kate Flannery
- Cinematography: Damian Horan
- Edited by: Michael P. Shawver
- Music by: Herman Beeftink
- Production companies: Tait Productions; Moving Pictures
- Distributed by: Gravitas Ventures
- Release dates: May 26, 2015 (Inside Out); February 5, 2016 (United States)
- Running time: 86 minutes
- Country: United States
- Language: English

4th Man Out is a 2015 American comedy film directed by Andrew Nackman and written by Aaron Dancik. The film stars Evan Todd as Adam, a young man living in Upstate New York who, on his 24th birthday, comes out as gay to his best friends Chris (Parker Young), Nick (Chord Overstreet), and Ortu (Jon Gabrus).

The film premiered on May 26, 2015, at the Inside Out Film and Video Festival, and had a limited release in the United States on February 5, 2016. The film received the audience award for Best Dramatic Feature Film at Outfest, along with the audience award for Best Narrative Feature at the InsideOut LGBT Film Festival in 2015.

== Plot ==
Adam, a small-town auto-mechanic, celebrates his 24th birthday with his childhood friends Chris, Nick and Ortu. At the bar, Chris meets a girl who he believes to be named Tracy and tries to pair her friend with Adam, but he declines. The following morning, Adam comes out as gay to his friends. Chris' girlfriend, Jess, reveals that she knew Adam was gay and believes that he's in love with Chris. Adam's friends are initially uncomfortable around him, but eventually come to accept and embrace his sexuality. While Chris decides to go out with Tracy from the bar, Adam goes out with a man he met online named Brad. Tracy leaves the date as Chris expresses discomfort about Adam being gay, and Adam is catfished by an older man who is married to a woman. While discussing their dates, Chris learns that Adam hasn't had a genuine relationship with a man since high school.

In order to mend Adam's loneliness, Chris rallies Nick and Ortu to help Adam find a boyfriend. While they improve Adam's confidence and dating life, he still remains unsuccessful in having a boyfriend. He also struggles to come out to his family as his mother tries setting him up with his old high school girlfriend, Dorothy. He is then harassed by his Christian fundamentalist neighbor, Martha, after she discovers he's gay. Chris invites Adam on a double date with Jess and her gay friend, Marc. However, Adam and Marc do not get along, causing a fight between Chris and Jess. The two break up, and Jess advises Chris not to be so close with Adam, as she still believes he's in love with him. Chris and Adam continue hanging out, and Adam encourages him to apologize to Tracy and start dating her, instead.

One day at the repair shop, Adam meets an attractive customer who he believes he has a connection with. He consults with his friends, and they also believe the customer is gay and interested in Adam. However, he awkwardly flirts with the customer and is unsuccessful in asking him out. During lunch with his family, Adam's mother keeps pressuring him to go out with Dorothy. Martha then arrives unannounced with a priest to help Adam repent for his sins, prompting him to come out to his family. Wanting to cheer Adam up, his friends take him out to the local gay bar. There, Chris runs into Tracy and her gay brother. While reconciling, Chris learns that he has mistakenly been calling her Tracy, which causes a rift in their relationship. Later that night, as Adam and Chris are hanging out together, Chris reaches over Adam to grab his phone. Adam goes in to kiss Chris in a misunderstanding. Realizing Adam's in love with him, Chris leaves.

Chris gets back with Jess and starts avoiding Adam. Ortu invites them for his Fourth of July barbecue, but Adam and Chris are unsure if they want to go if the other one plans on going. Adam gets advice from Brad to be honest about how he feels. Adam goes home to his parents and expresses his feelings. He later attends the barbecue with Dorothy, even though she knows he's gay, and introduces her to Nick. Meanwhile, Chris sees the car Adam fixed for the customer he liked and vandalizes it. He breaks up with Jess and goes to Ortu's party. Adam and Chris initially argue, but reconcile after Ortu proposes to his girlfriend. Adam invites "Tracy" over to the party and introduces her to Chris as Rachel. The two apologize to each other, with Chris kissing Adam to make sure there are no romantic feelings. Adam feels nothing and the two remain friends. The next day, the customer Adam flirted with returns to the shop after his car had been vandalized by Chris. Adam introduces himself to the customer, Matt.

== Cast ==
- Evan Todd as Adam
- Parker Young as Chris
- Chord Overstreet as Nick
- Jon Gabrus as Ortu
- Jennifer Damiano as Tracy/Rachel
- Jordan Lane Price as Jessica
- Kate Flannery as Karen, Adam's mother
- Richard Lounello as Frank, Adam's father
- Brooke Dillman as Martha, the neighbor
- Alex Rennie as Paul the stoner
- Doug Moe as Bradstar
- Nick Clark as Matt
- Christopher Whalen as Ugo
- Sean Hankinson as Derek
- Lucas Hazlett as Julian
- Brandon Gill as Hugh
- Jake Epstein as Marc Peters
- Laura Harrier as Dorothy Cuda
- Tommy Bracco as Giovanni
- Danielle Eliav as Michelle
- Cristina DiCarlo as Tracy/Rachel's friend
- Karlee Fomalont as Kim
- Merritt Reid as Brett, Tracy/Rachel's brother
- Marquis Wood as Steve, Brett's boyfriend

== Reception ==
The film received mixed to positive reviews from critics. The review aggregator website Rotten Tomatoes reported that 58% of critics gave the film a positive rating, based on 12 reviews, with an average score of 4.9/10. On Metacritic, which uses a normalized rating system, the film holds a 43/100 rating, based on seven reviews, indicating "mixed or average" reviews.
