= The Valleys series 3 =

The Valleys
- Series 3
- No. of episodes: 8

Release
- Original network: MTV
- Original release: 25 February – 15 April 2014

Series chronology
- ← Previous; Series 2

The third series of The Valleys, a British television programme based in Cardiff, Wales was confirmed in July 2013 after cast member Leeroy announced it on Twitter. It is expected to air on 25 February 2014 on MTV. This will be the first series not to include cast members Leeroy Reed and Liam Powell, who made their final appearances during Series 2. On 14 January, the new cast member was confirmed as Jack Watkins, a 24-year-old stripper. It was also announced that The Valleys club branded nights "Valleywood Nights" would be going on tour to various locations around the UK and Ireland including Liverpool, Bristol and Dublin. Despite originally being dropped from the show, Nicole announced she'd be returning for the third series.

== Storylines ==
Anthony, Carley, Chidgey, Jason, Jenna and Natalee return to the house and are then joined by Lateysha who makes a grand entrance on a horse. During their first night out in Cardiff, Carley takes a shine to the new butler, Jack leaving Chidgey jealous. The next morning the group are asked to return to the Valleys to meet AK and Jordan for work. As the group all return from work they're shocked to be greeted by Jack, who announces that he's their new housemate. Carley, Jenna and Lateysha all compete for Jack's attention causing Chidgey to get angry. Jason accidentally tells Natalee that Anthony cheated on her in Australia leaving her upset and doubting the relationship. Chidgey is far from impressed after finding out that everyone will learn how to strip for Valleywood nights, and is even less impressed to be taught by Jack. Following another night where the girls compete for Jack's attention, it's Jenna that catches his eye, but she reveals she doesn't want to be second best to anyone so rejects him. Nicole returns to the house, but is left disappointed when no one answers the door.

== Cast ==
- Anthony Suminski
- Carley Belmonte
- Darren Chidgey
- Jack Watkins
- Jason Suminski
- Jenna Jonathan
- Lateysha Grace
- Natalee Harris
- Nicole Morris

=== Duration of cast ===
Cast members	Series 3							
Cast members	1	2	3	4	5	6	7	8
Anthony								
Carley								
Chidgey								
Jason								
Jack								
Jenna								
Lateysha								
Natalee								
Nicole								

==== Notes ====
Key: = "Cast Member" is featured in this episode.
Key: = "Cast Member" arrives in the house.
Key: = "Cast Member" voluntarily leaves the house.
Key: = "Cast Member" is removed from the house.
Key: = "Cast Member" returns to the house.
Key: = "Cast Member" features in this episode, but outside of the house.
Key: = "Cast Member" does not feature in this episode.
Key: = "Cast Member" returns to the series.
Key: = "Cast Member" leaves the series.
Key: = "Cast Member" features in this episode despite not being an official cast member at the time.

== Episodes ==
No. overall	No. in series	Title	Duration	Original release date	Viewers
16	1	"Episode 1"	60 minutes	25 February 2014	511,000
The cast return to the house in Cardiff, and on their first night out Carley gets cosy with the butler, Jack. The next day they get a shock as they find out Jack is their new housemate, and the girls go all out to compete for his attention. Has a jealous Chidgey met his match? Jason accidentally tells Natalee that Anthony recently cheated on her in Australia leaving her doubting their relationship. With Carley, Jenna and Lateysha all flirting with Jack, it's Jenna that catches his eye. Nicole returns to the house but is disappointed when no one answers the door.
17	2	"Episode 2"	60 minutes	4 March 2014	499,000
Nicole goes all out to prove that she deserves her place in the house, and Lateysha is glad to have her best friend back in Cardiff. Natalee and Anthony's ongoing arguments continue as she plans to find out what really happened in Australia. Chidgey and Jack go out shopping to clear the air, but there's still clear tension between the two. After a strip from Jason, Lateysha's feelings for him grow. Carley is still torn between Chidgey and Jack so goes to see a psychic to get the answers.
18	3	"Episode 3"	60 minutes	11 March 2014	486,000
Jordan sends everyone off to Liverpool to take Valleywood nights on tour as Nicole returns to the house to announces her new role as the photographer. The big night suddenly spirals into chaos as Jenna and Nicole get their boobs out during Lateysha's performance causing her to rage against them, which leads to a huge fight. As Lateysha packs her belongings and leaves, Jenna's fury turns to Natalee, and Carley ends up in hospital after a fall. Shocked at how the night has ended, Jordan considers ending Valleywood tours.
19	4	"Episode 4"	60 minutes	18 March 2014	489,000
20	5	"Episode 5"	60 minutes	25 March 2014	424,000
21	6	"Episode 6"	60 minutes	1 April 2014	501,000
22	7	"Episode 7"	60 minutes	8 April 2014	474,000
23	8	"Episode 8"	60 minutes	15 April 2014	561,000

== Ratings ==
Episode	Date	Official MTV rating	MTV weekly rank	Official MTV+1 rating	Total MTV viewers
Episode 1	25 February 2014	458,000	1	53,000	511,000
Episode 2	4 March 2014	453,000	1	46,000	499,000
Episode 3	11 March 2014	451,000	1	35,000	486,000
Episode 4	18 March 2014	463,000	1	26,000	489,000
Episode 5	25 March 2014	390,000	1	34,000	424,000
Episode 6	1 April 2014	455,000	1	46,000	501,000
Episode 7	8 April 2014	462,000	1	12,000	474,000
Episode 8	15 April 2014	498,000	1	63,000	561,000
