= Celebrity Fat Fighters =

British reality television show

- Genre: Reality television
- Starring: Galia Grainger; Sandi Bogle; Jennifer Ellison; James Bennewith; Stevi Ritchie; Lateysha Grace; Riley Carter Millington; Danny Miles

Production
- Production company: Chalkboard TV

Original release
- Network: TLC
- Release: 2 January 2017 – January 2017

Celebrity Fat Fighters is a reality weight-loss television program, originally shown in January 2017 on the UK channel TLC.

The show sees Galia Grainger, who owns a weight loss camp near Battle, Sussex, working with seven celebrities, enforcing a 400 calorie diet and strict training regime. The series will have three episodes aired in January 2017.

The celebrities taking part are:

- Sandi Bogle (from Gogglebox)
- Jennifer Ellison (from Brookside)
- James Bennewith (from The Only Way is Essex)
- Stevi Ritchie (from The X Factor)
- Lateysha Grace (from Big Brother and The Valleys)
- Riley Carter Millington (from EastEnders)
- Danny Miles (comedian)
