= Celebrity Ex on the Beach series 1 =

First series of Celebrity Ex on the Beach

Celebrity Ex on the Beach
- Series 1
- No. of episodes: 15

Release
- Original network: MTV
- Original release: 21 January – 28 April 2020

Series chronology
- Next → Series 2

The first series of Celebrity Ex on the Beach began airing on 21 January 2020 with a 90-minute special. It concluded on 28 April following fifteen episodes, making it the longest series of the British franchise. The series was filmed in Marbella.

The series follows the cancellation of the tenth regular series, which was set to air in early 2019 but was cancelled due to the death of cast member Mike Thalassitis. None of the other cast members for the tenth series were announced.

== Cast ==
The list of celebrity cast members was released on 9 December 2019. They include four men; Olympic athlete Ashley McKenzie, television personality Calum Best, The Only Way Is Essex cast member Joey Essex, and Love Island star Michael Griffiths, and four women; Love Island star Georgia Harrison, The Valleys star Lateysha Grace, playboy model Lorena Medina and Mob Wives star Marissa Jade. It was also announced that the exes joining the series would be celebrities.

- **Bold** indicates original cast member; all other cast were brought into the series as an ex.

Episodes	Name	Age	Notability	Exes
15	**Ashley McKenzie**	30	Olympian	Danielle Kedward
15	**Calum Best**	38	TV personality, Love Island 2006 winner	Ayesha Reid, Marissa Jade, Megan Rapley, Victoria Winterford
15	**Georgia Harrison**	24	Love Island star	Ashley Tyler
15	**Joey Essex**	29	The Only Way Is Essex star	Ellie Brown
13	**Lateysha Grace**	26	The Valleys star	—N/a
15	**Lorena Medina**	27	Model	Itay Ohayon, Patrick Hale
15	**Marissa Jade**	34	Mob Wives star	Calum Best
15	**Michael Griffiths**	27	Love Island star	—N/a
15	Ellie Brown	21	Love Island star	Charlie Brake, Joey Essex
14	David McIntosh	34	Media personality	Metisha Schaefer, Tiffany Pollard
8	Victoria Winterford	26	Celebs Go Dating star	Calum Best, Lotan Carter
3	Itay Ohayon	26	Model	Lorena Medina
4	Danni Kedward	29	Glamour model	Ashley McKenzie
4	Charlie Brake	24	Love Island star	Ellie Brown
10	Sophie Kasaei	30	Geordie Shore star	—N/a
5	Tiffany Pollard	38	TV personality	David McIntosh
3	Lotan Carter	30	Big Brother star	Victoria Winterford
6	Patrick Hale	20	Model and Singer	Lorena Medina
1	Ayesha Reid	26	Model and Singer	Calum Best
5	Megan Rapley	23	Model	Calum Best
4	Miles Nazaire	24	Made in Chelsea star	—N/a
4	Metisha Schaefer	35	WAGS Miami star	David McIntosh
3	Ashley Tyler	30	—N/a	Georgia Harrison

=== Duration of cast ===
Cast members	Episodes														
Cast members	1	2	3	4	5	6	7	8	9	10	11	12	13	14	15
Ashley M															
Calum															
Georgia															
Joey															
Lateysha															
Lorena															
Marissa															
Michael															
Ellie															
David															
Victoria															
Itay															
Danni															
Charlie															
Sophie															
Tiffany															
Lotan															
Patrick															
Ayesha															
Megan															
Miles															
Metisha															
Ashley T															

Table Key
Key: = "Cast member" is featured in this episode
Key: = "Cast member" arrives on the beach
Key: = "Cast member" has an ex arrive on the beach
Key: = "Cast member" has two exes arrive on the beach
Key: = "Cast member" arrives on the beach and has an ex arrive during the same episode
Key: = "Cast member" leaves the beach
Key: = "Cast member" has an ex arrive on the beach and leaves during the same episode
Key: = "Cast member" arrives on the beach and leaves during the same episode
Key: = "Cast member" features in this episode as a guest
Key: = "Cast member" does not feature in this episode

== Episodes ==
No. overall	No. in season	Title	Original release date	UK viewers (thousands)	Duration
1	1	"Love at First Sight"	21 January 2020	280,000	90 minutes
Eight celebrity singles arrive in the villa where Joey and Lorena’s instant attraction doesn’t go unnoticed. Exes Marissa and Calum are shocked when they come face-to-face once again, whilst Lateysha has eyes for Michael. The group worry how close Joey and Lorena are getting when the pair get passionate – but the arrival of Joey’s ex Ellie puts a spanner in the works. Ashley opens up to Georgia about his feelings, whilst Lateysha is overwhelmed by her date with Michael. With Ellie here to rekindle things with Joey, Calum is the bearer of bad news as he tells her what Joey’s been up to back at the villa.
2	2	"Breaking Point"	28 January 2020	348,000	60 minutes
Ellie feels deflated when Joey fails to understand why she’s upset over the situation with Lorena. Calum and Marissa decide to take things slowly, whilst Ashley M is a shoulder to cry on for Ellie. Lateysha is gutted when she’s friendzoned by Michael. Elsewhere Ellie breaks down after witnessing too many public displays of affection by Joey and Lorena, and Georgia urges her to reveal how she really feels. David arrives on the beach to spice things up, but the Tablet of Terror has a further twist in store as it announces that another ex is on the way.
3	3	"Will You Be My Girlfriend?"	4 February 2020	331,000	60 minutes
Marissa is furious when Calum’s ex Victoria turns up on the beach wanting to go back to how things were between them. Lateysha is overcome with emotions when she realises that David is the man of her dreams, whilst Ellie and Ashley M’s date doesn’t go to plan. Marissa’s increasing jealousy causes friction for Calum as he tries to welcome Victoria into the group, and Ellie’s loss is Georgia’s gain as she confesses to being attracted to Ashley M. Marissa unleashes her fury towards Calum before clearing the air with Victoria, and there’s a spark between Lateysha and David during their date. Elsewhere Joey asks Lorena to be his girlfriend.
4	4	"May The Best Man Win"	11 February 2020	283,000	60 minutes
Georgia and Ashley M hit it off on their hands-on date, whilst Lateysha is excited with how things are going with David. There’s trouble for Joey and Lorena when her ex-boyfriend Itay arrives at the beach on a mission to win her back. Elsewhere Georgia plays match maker as she attempts to push Michael and Victoria together, and Itay’s aim to get steal Lorena from Joey doesn’t go to plan when she delivers him some harsh home truths instead. Lateysha’s luck runs out as David tells her they need to slow things down between them, and Joey declares war with Itay when the Tablet of Terror sends them shooting.
5	5	"Head To Head"	18 February 2020	232,000	60 minutes
David regrets cooling things off between Lateysha, but she’s determined to play hard to get. Itay works on accepting that Lorena has moved on with Joey, and Georgia worries that she may be leading Ashley M on. There’s double trouble at the beach when two exes arrive with bad blood. Ellie finally receives some closure from her ex-boyfriend Charlie, meanwhile Ashley M is shocked as to just how much he hurt his former flame Danni. Victoria seeks advice from the girls after becoming wary of Michael’s intentions with her, and the Tablet of Terror announces an eviction twist for the group.
6	6	"A New Celeb's In Toon!"	25 February 2020	338,000	60 minutes
There’s tension in the air as boys choose Victoria to potentially send packing, whilst the girls choose Itay to put on the block. Ashley M is forced to tell Danni about his feelings for Georgia, whilst Michael is gutted about the possibility of saying goodbye to Victoria. Sophie joins the cast in the villa but is shocked to learn that she has the ultimate power. Elsewhere Charlie cracks on with Danni, Georgia seeks advice from Joey, and Lorena fears another ex is on the way. Itay leaves the villa following Sophie’s big decision, and David receives a surprise at the beach when his ex Tiffany shows up.
7	7	"The Queen Has Arrived"	3 March 2020	344,000	60 minutes
Tiffany’s presence unnerves David as he’s forced into a date with her from the Tablet of Terror, but he is quick to admit that he doesn’t see Lateysha as anything other than friends. Back at the villa, Michael is enjoying the natural progression of the romance with Victoria, and Danni is wary of hurting Ellie by pursuing things with Charlie. Tiffany causes devastation as she wastes no time in letting Lateysha know what David said about her during their date, and he continues to dig himself a hole by admitting to having feelings for Marissa instead. The original cast are told they must send two exes home.
8	8	"Battle Of The Divas"	10 March 2020	315,000	60 minutes
Charlie and Danni are sent home by their fellow housemates, and Michael is thrilled that Victoria was chosen to stay as he admits he’s starting to catch feelings. Marissa ruffles feathers by flirting with David in front of Lateysha, whilst Victoria is knocked for six when her ex-boyfriend Lotan arrives on a mission to rekindle their relationship. Elsewhere Joey choreographs a special performance for Lorena, and Lateysha and Marissa go head-to-head over David. Victoria plays a dangerous game as she keeps both Lotan and Michael within arm’s length, and she knows she has a huge decision to make.
9	9	"Heartbreak"	17 March 2020	311,000	60 minutes
Michael begins to have second thoughts about his relationship with Victoria after questioning her motives with him, but the rest of the girls think he has a better connection with Ellie. The Tablet of Terror promises drama with the arrival of the next ex, and also sends Michael and Ellie out on a date. Lorena can’t contain her emotions when the love of her life Patrick turns up determined to win her back, leaving Joey worrying over her next move back at the villa. Victoria feels betrayed that Ellie would even consider looking at Michael in a romantic way. Elsewhere Joey and Patrick come face-to-face, and Lorena has to choose between her head and her heart.
10	10	"Double Trouble"	24 March 2020	375,000	60 minutes
Lorena feels that not even Patrick can break her and Joey’s bond, but she’s thrown to hear that he still wants to make music with her. Lateysha and David’s feud is reignited until the Tablet of Terror sends them on a date to air their differences. Joey delivers Lorena an ultimatum after finding out she still wants to work with Patrick outside of the villa. Lotan and Victoria are sent packing following another devastating twist, meanwhile Lorena promises Joey that she will cut all ties with her ex. Georgia is put in a difficult position as she feels smothered by Ashley M, Patrick takes swipe at Lorena, and Calum gets a shock at the beach.
11	11	"Calum's Choice"	31 March 2020	358,000	60 minutes
Calum is hit with a double whammy as two of his exes, Ayesha and Megan arrive on the beach competing for his affections. Patrick delivers some home truths to Lorena after realising just how quick she moved on with Joey, whilst Ashley M is confused with how distant Georgia is being with him. Megan lays her heart on the line to Calum, but it’s Ayesha who spends the night in the VIP suite with him. Lorena finally gives Patrick the closure he needs, Michael worries that he might hurt Ellie if things progress, and Georgia breaks Ashley M’s heart by calling it a day. The power enters Calum’s hands as he’s forced to send one of his exes home, and ultimately chooses Ayesha.
12	12	"Miles And The Mob Wife"	7 April 2020	327,000	60 minutes
Miles arrives at the villa with an instant connection to Marissa, but Georgia also has her eyes set on him. Elsewhere Lateysha resists David’s charm once again, whilst Michael and Ellie continue to gravitate towards each other. David receives some grief when his ex-girlfriend Metisha turns up hell-bent on revenge, and Calum and Megan get closer back at the villa. Metisha and Lateysha team up to give David some home truths, Marissa receives a birthday date with Miles, and David’s attempt to apologise to Metisha get shot down. When the boys enjoy a day out of the villa, the girls have to decide their fate.
13	13	"As One Door Closes Another One Opens"	14 April 2020	344,000	60 minutes
Patrick and Joey finally put an end to their feud before Patrick is chosen to leave the villa following the girls’ tough decision. It all gets too much for Lateysha as she decides to head home, whilst Metisha falls under David’s spell once again. Georgia sets her sights on Miles after getting the green light from Marissa, and Sophie can’t believe her luck after sharing a kiss with Georgia’s new ex, Ashley T. Metisha and David spend the night in the VIP suite after laying all his cards on the table, Sophie plans on taking things slow with Ashley T, and Miles makes a move on Georgia.
14	14	"The Mob Wife Goes In"	21 April 2020	365,000	60 minutes
The group wake up to some good vibes for a change, but trouble brews as David desperately tries to push Marissa’s buttons. Miles and Georgia share a bond as the Tablet of Terror sends them on a date, meanwhile back at the villa Marissa feels the pair have gone behind her back. Miles fails to defend Georgia when she faces a grilling from David, and Marissa and Lorena go head to head over breakfast as home truths are shared. Elsewhere Miles puts Georgia firmly in the friend-zone, Calum and Megan are enjoying taking things slow, and Lorena and Joey are tested once again as they’re both sent to the beach to await a surprise.
15	15	"The Finale"	28 April 2020	349,000	60 minutes
Joey is reunited with his Dad when shows up at the beach to find out what he’s been up to with Lorena. Sophie and Ashley T look to the future, and Georgia breaks down after realising she hasn’t found what she was looking for in the villa. The group reminisce over their time looking for love and discuss their highs and lows of the last few weeks, and the couples plan their lives on the outside. Georgia realises her feelings for Ashley M didn’t go away, as Joey makes a huge gesture towards Lorena, and Michael and Ellie make arrangements. Patrick returns to serenade the group with an original song.

== Ratings ==
Episode	Date	MTV weekly rank	Total MTV viewers
Episode 1	21 January 2020	1	280,000
Episode 2	28 January 2020	1	348,000
Episode 3	4 February 2020	1	331,000
Episode 4	11 February 2020	1	283,000
Episode 5	18 February 2020	1	232,000
Episode 6	25 February 2020	1	338,000
Episode 7	3 March 2020	1	344,000
Episode 8	10 March 2020	1	315,000
Episode 9	17 March 2020	1	311,000
Episode 10	24 March 2020	1	375,000
Episode 11	31 March 2020	2	358,000
Episode 12	7 April 2020	1	327,000
Episode 13	14 April 2020	1	344,000
Episode 14	21 April 2020	2	365,000
Episode 15	28 April 2020	1	349,000
Average viewers		1	327,000
