= The Valleys series 2 =

The Valleys
- Series 2
- No. of episodes: 8 + 1 special

Release
- Original network: MTV
- Original release: 23 April – 18 June 2013

Series chronology
- ← Previous; Series 1 Next → Series 3

The second series of The Valleys, a British television programme based in Cardiff, Wales, began airing on 23 April 2013 on MTV with a special episode featuring the best bits from the first series. Eight regular episodes aired from 30 April to 18 June. This is the first series to feature twins Anthony and Jason Suminski, replacing Aron Williams, who quit that April. It is the final series with Leeroy Reed and Liam Powell.

== Storylines ==
Carley, Chidgey, Jenna, Lateysha, Liam, and Nicole arrive in the house; Chidgey and Carley decide to pretend that they're a couple. They're then joined by twins, Anthony and Jason, who immediately cause chaos within the house. Later, several arguments break out between Liam, Jenna, and Carley. Carley then goes to Chidgey for comfort.

The next day, the whole group is invited out to do some modelling, and Nicole styles their clothes. Jenna enjoys getting close to both Anthony and Jason during the photoshoot and begins to develop feelings towards them. Jenna takes Chidgey aside to discuss his relationship with Carley, but he tells her the truth about how there's nothing going on between them. As always, she makes her feelings well known towards them, but is shocked to hear that Jenna has been kissing one of them the night before. Lateysha's not happy when she realises there's crumbs in her hair extensions from a food fight and plots to get revenge on the boys by putting fish in their pillowcases. As the girls demand an apology from the boys, more arguments erupt between Liam and Carley. Later that night during a night out, Liam is expecting to be called up by Jordan to DJ for the club, but receives a shock when he actually asks Carley instead, thus sparking a rivalry.

AK asks Chidgey to go into work to do another photoshoot, this time with Liam. When they arrive at work, Chidgey is horrified to find out it's a gay photoshoot and will have to get close to Liam. Carley then decides she can't cope with all the arguments in the house so packs her bags and returns home, saying goodbye to Chidgey. With the whole house shocked at Carley's departure, Natalee continues to get close to Anthony but he's worried that it will affect his friendship with Chidgey.

That night, the group goes for another night out together, but ends up causing arguments about Natalee and Chidgey as he mentions kissing Carley. Anthony's there to pick up the pieces though for Natalee and they all go home. Meanwhile, AK and Jordan visit Carley in Caerphilly and convince her to return to Cardiff to follow her dream. When the group arrives back at the house, they find Carley in the house and are all delighted that she's back. All except Liam. As the tension between Carley and Liam increases, arguments erupt between them both, and Lateysha and Nicole get involved.

The next night, the group hosts a house party and Carley invites Millie, who previously had sex with Leeroy and kissed Chidgey. Natalee decides to turn to Anthony for support and they get together again, but Carley decides to turn to alcohol. After quizzing Carley over what's happened, Natalee feels uncomfortable with the situation and begins another argument. Meanwhile, Leeroy is planning a return to the house after a meeting with Jordan.

The following day, after spending the night in bed with Jason, Jenna receives a visit from her mother to take her down to London for the interview. Panicking that her mother will find out what she's been up to, Jenna quickly gets dressed and leaves. During her interview for Nuts, Jenna's told that she's wanted on the cover of the magazine with Lateysha. That night, Carley decides to stay in as she's feeling unwell, but Chidgey thinks it's to do with her growing feelings for him. Natalee and Chidgey call a truce on the night out, but it soon turns into bickering again, when she asks if he can try and pull Carley.

On Jenna's big day, she and Natalee go down to London for the Nuts photoshoot. Natalee finally apologises to Carley and says she'll spend more time with her, but then leaves her for Anthony. Back at the house, Chidgey and Carley discuss their situation, and Jenna finally chooses Jason over Leeroy.

Whilst at the Valleywood photo shoot, the boys wreak havoc with the girls by dragging them around in mud, leaving Lateysha angry with them. Natalee gets too drunk though and everyone returns to the house. As Chidgey also brings a girl back, he's soon let down when Carley changes her mind and ends up with Leeroy.

Natalee blames Chidgey the next morning for encouraging Anthony to get into bed with a girl. Natalee then moves on to Anthony and tells him that they need to stay away from each other to avoid getting hurt. However, that night, Natalee goes for revenge on a girls' night out and kisses loads of boys. Carley also goes all out to prove she doesn't have feelings for Chidgey and tries to get another boy to love her, but then the boys go into the party without an invitation and she's immediately drawn to him. The pair get close and end up in bed together.

As the night of Valleywood approaches, the group goes to rehearsals, but Carley is clearly troubled and can't take it anymore. She returns to the house, packs her bags, and goes back to Cardiff without telling anyone. When everyone realises Carley is gone, Natalee and Chidgey pin the blame on each other. The next morning, everyone packs their bags to return to Cardiff, but they get a visit from Jordan and AK where they reveal that Jordan and AK want to continue working with everyone except Nicole and Liam.

== Cast ==
- Anthony Suminski
- Carley Belmonte
- Darren Chidgey
- Jason Suminski
- Jenna Jonathan
- Lateysha Grace
- Leeroy Reed
- Liam Powell
- Natalee Harris
- Nicole Morris

=== Duration ===
Cast members	Series 2							
Cast members	1	2	3	4	5	6	7	8
Anthony								
Carley								
Chidgey								
Jason								
Jenna								
Lateysha								
Leeroy								
Liam								
Natalee								
Nicole								

==== Key ====
= Features in this episode.
= Arrives in the house.
= Voluntarily leaves the house.
= Removed from the house.
= Returns to the house.
= Features in this episode, outside the house.
= Does not feature in this episode.
= Leaves the series.

== Episodes ==
No. overall	No. in series	Title	Duration	Original release date	Viewers
7	1	"Filthy Bits"	60 minutes	23 April 2013	60,000 (Note: Viewership for this episode does not include the MTV+1 broadcast.)
A look back at the naughtiest bits from series 1.
8	2	"Episode 1"	60 minutes	30 April 2013	482,000
Carley, Chidgey, Jenna, Lateysha, Liam and Nicole return to the house and are joined by twins, Anthony and Jason who immediately cause carnage. Carley and Chidgey pretend they're in a relationship and to be more convincing, they kiss. As Jenna gets close to the twins, her mum arrives and warns Jenna to stay away from them, or else. Liam and Carley clash. After a huge food fight, the girls get revenge on the boys by putting fish in their beds. When Carley's asked to DJ by Jordan, it causes more tension between her and Liam.
9	3	"Episode 2"	60 minutes	7 May 2013	494,000
It's Chidgey's birthday and he's not happy when AK makes him do a gay photoshoot with Liam, and to make matters worse, Natalee returns to the house and begins to flirt with Anthony. Liam tells Natalee about Carley and Chidgey's kiss and she has no choice but to confront Carley about it. After several arguments, Carley decides to pack her bags and leaves Cardiff. Meanwhile, Jenna and Chidgey begin to get close again and share some moments during another photoshoot and Anthony is given Chidgey's approval and decides to go for it with Natalee.
10	4	"Episode 3"	60 minutes	14 May 2013	503,000
Natalee and Chidgey fall out again as he mentions kissing Carley. Meanwhile, Jordan and AK convince Carley to return to Cardiff but there's clear tension between her and Liam. Just as Natalee thinks she's involved with Anthony, he brings female twins back to the club which causes an atmosphere for the girls. Arguments erupt between Liam, Carley, Lateysha and Nicole, and Jenna finally gets with Jason as Natalee and Anthony get close again. Chidgey attempts numerous times to get with different girls, but ends up speaking to Carley as she tells him she loves him.
11	5	"Episode 4"	60 minutes	21 May 2013	525,000
It's the morning after the night before and Carley tries to blame her confession on the alcohol. Natalee feels uncomfortable with Carley and Chidgey being so close and makes her feelings known, but then later apologises to Carley when there's an atmosphere. Jenna goes to a meeting and finds out she's wanted on the cover of Nuts magazine. With Jenna and Jason celebrating her success, Leeroy returns to the house looking for her. Jenna's immediately put in an awkward situation as Jason and Leeroy compete for her attention.
12	6	"Episode 5"	60 minutes	28 May 2013	541,000
Leeroy leaves the house to go back to the studio as Jenna's still deciding whom to choose, him or Jason. Carley misses out on an opportunity to DJ for Radio Cardiff when she's ill, but Liam is a success when he goes on his own. The girls go to London for Jenna's photoshoot for Nuts, and Carley's jealous of Natalee's sudden friendship with Jenna. Meanwhile, the boys show how Welsh they are by going camping in the middle of a field but it's a disaster when sheep steal the tent. Carley and Natalee call a truce, and Jenna finally chooses Jason over Leeroy.
13	7	"Episode 6"	60 minutes	4 June 2013	680,000
As Chidgey comforts an upset Carley, Jenna mistakenly thinks she's seen them kissing and goes to Natalee with the gossip. Carley's not happy though when she overhears the conversation and swears it's not true. Leeroy and Jason compete for Jenna's attention again but she sticks with Jason leaving Leeroy disappointed. Jordan demands Carley do more work and arranges Liam to teach her how to DJ. Natalee's far from impressed when Anthony pulls on a night out, and Chidgey's left lonely as his girl changes her mind and ends up with Leeroy.
14	8	"Episode 7"	60 minutes	11 June 2013	648,000
Natalee and the twins mess with Jenna's mum by telling her that Jenna's been getting with Jason then swapping the twins. Carley goes all out to pull but ends up in bed with Chidgey. The next day Chidgey takes Carley on a date and they grow closer, but Carley thinks it's more serious than it actually is so she's disappointed when he tries to pull Millie on a night out. Natalee can't stay away from Anthony, and Lateysha's rewarded by being on the Valleywood posters. Jenna's drawn a little closer to Leeroy after a disaster in bed with Jason.
15	9	"Episode 8"	60 minutes	18 June 2013	633,000
During rehearsals for Valleywood, Carley decides she's had enough and returns home to Cardiff leaving the others confused. Natalee and Chidgey blame each other for her departure. As the night of Valleywood finally arrives, it all goes successful until Lateysha is horrified to learn that Leeroy is the special guest after she initially thought that she was. Everyone returns to the house but Jason brings some girls back and clearly upsets Jenna. Natalee stands by Jenna and throws the girls out despite Jason. The final morning, Jordan and AK reveal that they want to continue working with everyone except Liam and Nicole. This was the last episode to feature Leeroy Reed and Liam Powell.

== Ratings ==
Episode	Date	Official MTV rating	MTV weekly rank	Official MTV+1 rating	Total MTV viewers
Filthy Bits	23 April	60,000	3		
Episode 1	30 April	423,000	1	59,000	482,000
Episode 2	7 May	417,000	1	77,000	494,000
Episode 3	14 May	431,000	1	72,000	503,000
Episode 4	21 May	454,000	1	71,000	525,000
Episode 5	28 May	449,000	1	92,000	541,000
Episode 6	4 June	624,000	1	56,000	680,000
Episode 7	11 June	568,000	1	80,000	648,000
Episode 8	18 June	557,000	1	76,000	633,000
