= The Valleys series 1 =

The Valleys
- Series 1
- No. of episodes: 6

Release
- Original network: MTV
- Original release: 25 September – 30 October 2012

Series chronology
- Next → Series 2

The first series of The Valleys, a British television programme based in Cardiff, Wales, began airing on 25 September 2012 on MTV. The series concluded on 30 October 2012 after 6 episodes. This series followed nine youngsters from The Valleys as they moved to Cardiff, the capital city of Wales to live out their dreams while trying to impress their new bosses, Jordan and AK. This is the only series which Aron Williams appeared in.

== Storylines ==
When Nicole arrives, there's tension straight away as she reveals that Lateysha slept with her ex-boyfriend. The rivalry between the girls soon changes as they become good friends and even share some passionate kisses on nights out. Aron is surprised when Nicole shows more interest in Lateysha than him after he tries it on with her. It becomes clear that Lateysha and Liam don't like each other and several arguments erupt in the house. However, an argument with Leeroy proves too much for Lateysha after initially fancying him and she finally decides to pack her bags and leaves. After a couple of days away, the girls realise how much they're missing Lateysha and go to visit her at home. Lateysha decides to return to Cardiff with them but doesn't get the welcome back she was expecting from the boys. Aron begins to develop feelings towards Nicole and he takes her out for a date, but at the end of the night things aren't very successful as she ends up with Lateysha instead.

However, Nicole begins to get jealous as she spots Aron flirting with another girl on a night out. Drowning her sorrows, she begins to get violent and jumps on every boy in sight. Unbeknownst to any of this, Aron takes the girl home and into the cwtch downstairs. Nicole and Lateysha return to the house and get revenge on Aron by emptying the contents of their bin into his bed, but they're caught in the act by Liam who steps in to defend his friend. As Aron's downstairs with the girl, he has no idea of the arguments upstairs between Liam, Nicole and Lateysha or the state of his bed. The next morning Nicole apologises for her actions.

Chidgey tries his luck with Jenna after an intimate photoshoot on the beach, but he has second thoughts after he meets her mum. Back at the house, he tries his luck again and Jenna seems interested. However, as Chidgey and Jenna finally seem to be getting close, Natalee, his ex-girlfriend arrives in the house to stir things up. Both Natalee and Jenna compete for Chidgey's attention and Natalee's the one who ends up in bed with him. When the pair start bickering about their past relationship, Natalee spreads rumours about him to the other girls. Jenna tells Chidgey what Natalee has said behind his back so he decides to confront her, causing another huge argument. During a game of truth or dare with the group, Natalee and Chidgey's questions get personal and it's not long before they're shouting at each other and Chidgey reveals that he still loves her. Confused over her feelings for him, Natalee confides in Carley. Scared of going back to how things were, Chidgey promises not to go back to Natalee again but after nothing more than a kiss from another girl on a night out, he comes home alone and tries his luck with Natalee again. The next day during the photoshoot, Chidgey finds out he'll be working with Natalee which causes tension between them. As Natalee walks out on the job, AK's left picking up the pieces and convinces her to come back.

During a night out, Natalee notices looks shared between Chidgey and another girl and immediately works out that they've kissed. Her anger gets too much and she turns violent towards him in the club, leading Jordan to step in and throw them out. After a night away discussing their problems, Natalee and Chidgey return to the house where they're joined by Jordan who tells them to pack their bags and go home. The next day both Natalee and Chidgey announce they're back together but are told that AK wants to meet with them both. During the meeting AK offers Chidgey another chance in Cardiff but as long as he comes back alone. He's forced to choose between his career or his girlfriend. As he chooses to accept AK's offer, it disappoints Natalee and causes more arguments between the pair. Natalee feels it's unfair how Chidgey was offered a second chance but not her. Chidgey and AK grow closer during the next photoshoot, which leaves Lateysha and Jenna suspicious over AK's reasons for wanting Chigey back and not Natalee. Another night out ends in disaster for Chidgey as he attempts to speak to a girl then sees Leeroy speaking to her, causing huge arguments between them. Liam confronts Chidgey saying he's only in Cardiff for himself and isn't bothered about Natalee's feelings, and then tells Carley what Chidgey really gets up to on a night out.

The night of the big event arrives and Natalee turns up to gate crash the party. Carley quickly hints to Natalee that Chidgey's been up to no good and Natalee plans to get her own back. AK celebrates with Chidgey over their successful night but Natalee catches them together and assumes the worst. Confronting them both over what she thinks she's seen, Chidgey drops himself in it over the girl in the club the previous night. Natalee issues Chidgey with an ultimatum, to come home with her or their relationship is over for good. The next day Chidgey announces that he and Natalee are back together and he packs his bags and returns home with her.

== Cast ==
- Aron Williams
- Carley Belmonte
- Darren Chidgey
- Jenna Jonathan
- Lateysha Grace
- Leeroy Reed
- Liam Powell
- Natalee Harris
- Nicole Morris

=== Duration of cast ===
| Cast members | Series 1 | | | | | |
| Cast members | 1 | 2 | 3 | 4 | 5 | 6 |
| Aron | | | | | | |
| Carley | | | | | | |
| Chidgey | | | | | | |
| Jenna | | | | | | |
| Lateysha | | | | | | |
| Leeroy | | | | | | |
| Liam | | | | | | |
| Natalee | | | | | | |
| Nicole | | | | | | |

==== Notes ====
Key: = "Cast Member" is featured in this episode.
Key: = "Cast Member" arrives in the house.
Key: = "Cast Member" voluntarily leaves the house.
Key: = "Cast Member" is removed from the house.
Key: = "Cast Member" returns to the house.
Key: = "Cast Member" features in this episode, but outside of the house.
Key: = "Cast Member" leaves the series.

== Episodes ==
| No. overall | No. in series | Title | Duration | Original release date | Viewers |
|---|---|---|---|---|---|
| 1 | 1 | "Episode 1" | 60 minutes | 25 September 2012 | 510,000 |
Aron, Carley, Chidgey, Jenna, Lateysha, Leeroy, Liam and Nicole all arrive in Cardiff to live out their dreams. After their first night out, Carley fails to make a good impression on the new boss, Jordan and he issues his first warning. Chidgey and Jenna get close after an intimate photoshoot on the beach, although he's immediately put off after visiting Jenna's mum. Leeroy tries his luck with Lateysha but then ends up in bed with Carley, and Liam announces to everyone that he's gay.
| 2 | 2 | "Episode 2" | 60 minutes | 2 October 2012 | 461,000 |
Chidgey's ex girlfriend, Natalee arrives in the house and quickly stirs things between him and Jenna. Natalee and Chidgey end up in bed together only for him to find out she's been spreading rumours about him. Lateysha continues to annoy Liam and the pair clash. AK's not impressed when Chidgey and Lateysha refuse to wear the fetish costumes in her photoshoot, and there's huge arguments between Natalee and Chidgey during a game of truth or dare.
| 3 | 3 | "Episode 3" | 60 minutes | 9 October 2012 | 566,000 |
Chidgey promises not to go back to Natalee, but after a night out with nothing more than a kiss from other girls, he turns to her again to try his luck. However, the tension between them soon turns to arguments the next day at work as AK's left picking up the pieces. A night out ends in disaster as Carley's taken to hospital. Lateysha and Leeroy share some home truths leaving Lateysha upset, and after another argument with Liam, she packs her bags and leaves.
| 4 | 4 | "Episode 4" | 60 minutes | 16 October 2012 | 619,000 |
A night out in Jordan's club takes a turn for the worse as Natalee discovers Chidgey's kissed another girl, and as her anger increases, she turns violent with him. Jordan's quick to step in and asks them both to pack their bags and leave Cardiff for good. Lateysha returns but doesn't get the welcome back she was expecting, and Jenna finally gives into Leeroy as the pair spend the night together. Jenna gets emotional as AK encourages her to have her hair cut short for her career, and Aron and Nicole go on a date.
| 5 | 5 | "Episode 5" | 60 minutes | 23 October 2012 | 682,000 |
As Natalee and Chidgey finally get back together, AK offers him an ultimatum to either stay with Natalee or return to Cardiff alone. Chidgey eventually puts his career first leaving Natalee no choice but to kick off with him. Leeroy has no success on a night out and a comment from Chidgey angers him so that arguments are caused. Nicole begins to get jealous when Aron flirts with a girl in the club who he eventually takes back to the house. Liam catches Nicole trashing Aron's bed and he quickly sticks up for his friend. Jenna and Leeroy continue to get close.
| 6 | 6 | "Episode 6" | 60 minutes | 30 October 2012 | 682,000 |
The boys go on their last night out before the big event but moods are quickly ruined as Chidgey and Leeroy clash over a girl. The next morning Liam tells Carley about Chidgey trying it on with a girl in the club, and they worry about how Natalee would take it. As the big night arrives, everything seems to be going successful until Natalee arrives planning to gatecrash the party. AK and Chidgey celebrate their night, then Natalee catches them together and immediately suspects the worst. Jenna finally gives into temptation with Leeroy. Chidgey and Natalee discuss their situation and get back together before both leaving Cardiff. Everyone says as an emotional goodbye before returning home. This was the last episode to feature Aron Williams.

== Ratings ==
| Episode | Date | Official MTV rating | MTV weekly rank | Official MTV+1 rating | Total MTV viewers |
|---|---|---|---|---|---|
| Episode 1 | 25 September | 451,000 | 1 | 59,000 | 510,000 |
| Episode 2 | 2 October | 428,000 | 1 | 33,000 | 461,000 |
| Episode 3 | 9 October | 503,000 | 1 | 63,000 | 566,000 |
| Episode 4 | 16 October | 578,000 | 1 | 41,000 | 619,000 |
| Episode 5 | 23 October | 572,000 | 1 | 110,000 | 682,000 |
| Episode 6 | 30 October | 591,000 | 1 | 91,000 | 682,000 |
