= Leeroy Reed =

- Born: Leeroy James Reed; 6 August 1990 (age 36)
- Origin: Bridgend, Wales, United Kingdom
- Genres: Hip hop, pop, R&B
- Occupations: TV personality, recording artist
- Instrument: Vocals
- Label: Transmission Recordings
- Website: https://twitter.com/LeeroyReed_Vex

Leeroy Reed (born 6 August 1990) is a Welsh television star and recording artist. He rose to fame in 2012 after appearing in the first episode of the MTV television series The Valleys. Reed has continued to feature in the programme for the rest of its duration. In 2013, Reed recorded and released a single entitled "Can't Get Enough". The single was released on 23 June 2013 through Transmission Recordings and entered the UK Singles Chart at number 37. The Australian version of "Can't Get Enough" features Australian recording artist Emily Williams. In October 2017, Reed was exposed as a drug dealer and sent to prison for 22 months.

== Discography ==
=== Singles ===
Year	Title	Peak chart positions	Album
Year	Title	UK	Album
2013	"Can't Get Enough" (featuring Nagla)	37	Non-album single
