= Miles Nazaire =

English television personality (born 1995)

- Born: Miles James Nazaire; 12 December 1995 (age 30); Westminster, London, England
- Occupation: Television personality
- Television: Made in Chelsea; Celebrity Ex on the Beach; Celebs Go Dating; Dancing on Ice

Miles James Nazaire (born 12 December 1995) is an English television personality, known for being a cast member on the E4 reality series Made in Chelsea (2018–present). He has also made appearances on other television shows including Celebrity Ex on the Beach (2020) and Celebs Go Dating (2022). In 2023, Nazaire fronted a documentary on Channel 4, titled Obsessed With My Muscles. He appeared as a contestant on the sixteenth series of Dancing on Ice in 2024.

== Early life ==
Miles James Nazaire was born on 12 December 1995 in Westminster, London. His mother Victoria is a sculptor, whilst his father Jacques Nazaire is a musician and painter of Caribbean and Indian descent who founded the Artpeggios Music and Art School. He graduated from the BRIT School in 2014 with a degree in Broadcast Digital Communications.

== Career ==
In 2018, Nazaire was announced to be joining the cast of the E4 reality series Made in Chelsea for the show's fifteenth series. Nazaire's early appearances on the show documented his relationship with Maeva D'Ascanio which ultimately broke down and lead to their split. He has continued to appear in the series ever since and has been in relationships with his co-stars including Tiffany Watson, Inga Valentina and Ruby Adler respectively. In December 2019, he appeared on a celebrity version of the Channel 4 dating dance series Flirty Dancing for Stand Up to Cancer. In April 2020, Nazaire appeared on the first series of Celebrity Ex on the Beach, joining the show in the twelfth episode.

In 2022, Nazaire signed up to appear on the tenth series of E4 reality dating series Celebs Go Dating. During his time on the show, he dated The Only Way Is Essex cast member Chloe Brockett. Later that year, he appeared on an episode of BBC Three series Eating with My Ex in which he went on a date with former girlfriend D'Ascanio. In October 2023, Nazaire fronted a Channel 4 documentary titled Obsessed With My Muscles. In the documentary, he discussed his own issues with muscle dysmorphia and interviewed other men who had had the same feelings. Nazaire was announced to be competing in the sixteenth series of Dancing on Ice in 2024.

In January 2026, Nazaire moved to Dubai.

== Filmography ==
As himself
Year	Title	Notes	Ref.
2018–present	Made in Chelsea	Cast member; 137 episodes	
2019	Flirty Dancing	1 episode	
2020	Celebrity Ex on the Beach	Cast member; series 1	
2022	Eating with My Ex	1 episode	
2022	Celebs Go Dating	Cast member; series 10	
2022	The Courtship	4 episodes	
2023	Obsessed With My Muscles	Himself / Presenter	
2024	Dancing on Ice	Contestant; series 16	
