= Calvin Wellington =

Welsh rugby footballer

Personal information
- Born: 10 December 1995 (age 29); Port Talbot, Wales
- Height: 6 ft 2.5 in (1.89 m)
- Weight: 13 st 12 lb (88 kg)

Playing information

Rugby league
- Position: Wing, Centre
Club
| Years | Team | Pld | T | G | FG | P |
|---|---|---|---|---|---|---|
| 2016–17 | St Helens | 1 | 0 | 0 | 0 | 0 |
| 2017(loan) | → Sheffield Eagles | 1 | 0 | 0 | 0 | 0 |
| 2017 | Workington Town | 0 | 0 | 0 | 0 | 0 |
| 2019–21 | Workington Town | 11 | 2 | 0 | 0 | 8 |
| 2022–23 | Oldham R.L.F.C. | 10 | 4 | 0 | 0 | 16 |
| 2023– | Rochdale Hornets | 0 | 0 | 0 | 0 | 0 |
| | Total | 23 | 6 | 0 | 0 | 24 |

Rugby union
Club
| Years | Team | Pld | T | G | FG | P |
|---|---|---|---|---|---|---|
| 2017–19 | Dragons | 2 | 0 | 0 | 0 | 0 |
- Source: As of 8 October 2023
- Relatives: Lateysha Grace (cousin); Regan Grace (cousin)

Calvin Wellington (born 10 December 1995) is a Welsh professional rugby league footballer who plays as a centre for Rochdale Hornets in League 1.

== Rugby league ==
=== St Helens ===
Wellington previously played rugby league for St Helens in the Super League.

=== Sheffield Eagles (loan) ===
In July 2017, Wellington joined the Sheffield Eagles on loan until the end of the 2017 season. The Sheffield Eagles were at the time beginning their end-of-season campaign to win the Championship Shield. He joined along with two St. Helens' teammates; Liam Cooper and Jonah Cunningham.

=== Oldham R.L.F.C. ===
On 1 November 2021 it was reported that he had signed for Oldham RLFC in the RFL League 1.

=== Rochdale Hornets ===
On 12 July 2023 it was reported that he had signed for Rochdale.

== Rugby Union ==
=== Dragons ===
In November 2017 he joined the Welsh rugby union team the Dragons as a wing or centre in the Pro14 league.
