= Regan Grace =

Wales international rugby league footballer

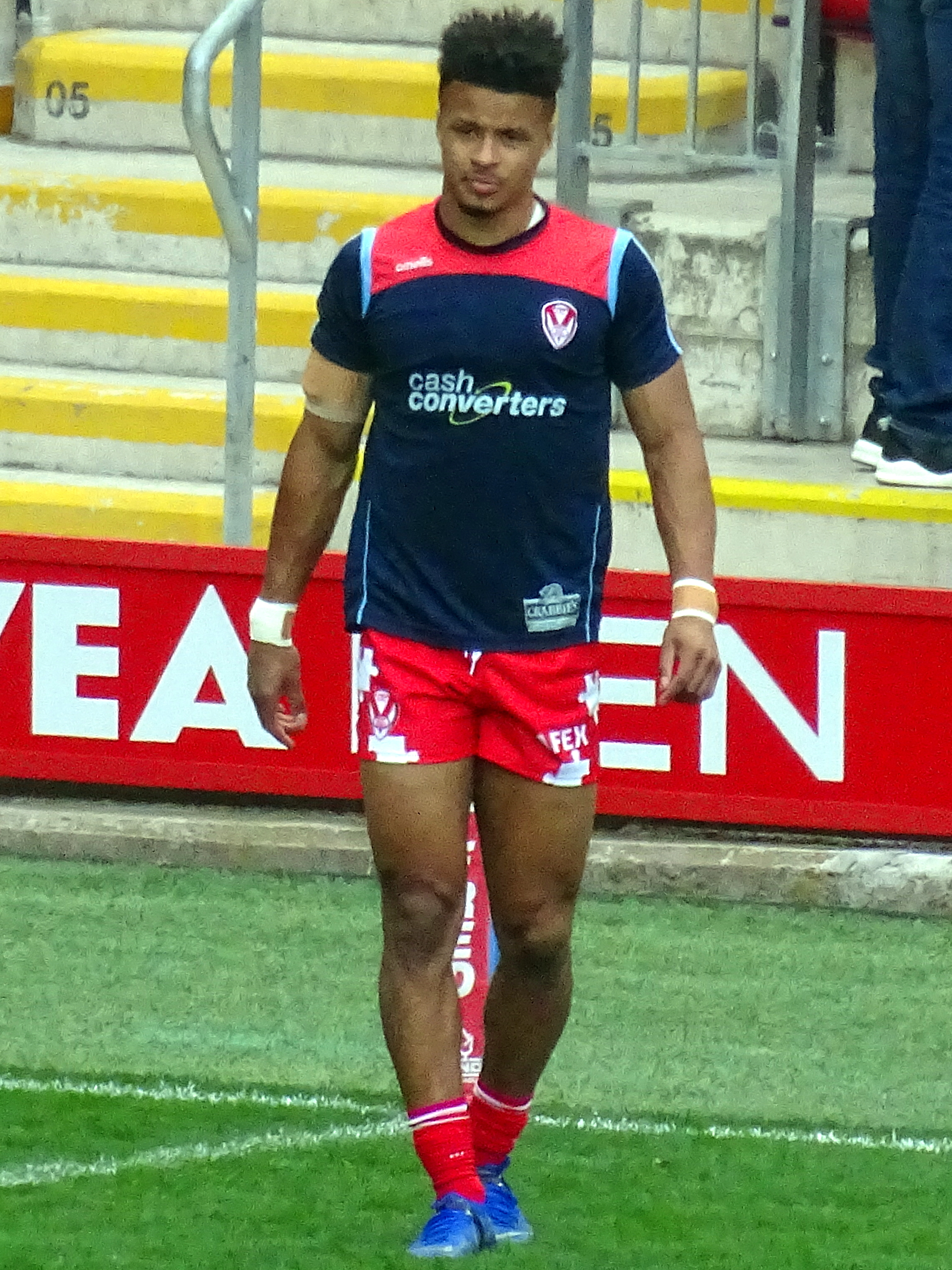

Personal information
- Born: 12 December 1996 (age 29) Port Talbot, Neath Port Talbot, Wales
- Height: 5 ft 10 in (1.78 m)
- Weight: 12 st 12 lb (82 kg)

Playing information

Rugby league
- Position: Wing, Fullback
Club
Years	Team	Pld	T	G	FG	P
2016–22	St Helens	142	88	0	0	352
Representative
Years	Team	Pld	T	G	FG	P
2015–17	Wales	6	3	0	0	12

Rugby union
Club
Years	Team	Pld	T	G	FG	P
2022–23	Racing 92	0	0	0	0	0
2024–25	Bath	2	0	0	0	0
2025	Cardiff	4	0	0	0	0
2025	Sale Sharks	1	0	0	0	0
	Total	7	0	0	0	0
Representative
Years	Team	Pld	T	G	FG	P
2024	Wales Tour Match	1	1	0	0	5
- Source: As of 13 October 2026
- Education: St Joseph's Catholic School, Port Talbot
- Relatives: Lateysha Grace (sister); Calvin Wellington (cousin)

Regan Grace (born 12 December 1996) is a Welsh professional dual-code rugby footballer who plays rugby union as a wing for Bath.

He started his professional career coming through the academy and playing six seasons with English league side St Helens in the Super League.

He has represented Wales at international level for rugby league and rugby union.

== Early life ==
Grace was born in Port Talbot, Wales and is of Jamaican descent. He was educated at St Joseph's Catholic School in Port Talbot.

He is the brother of television personality Lateysha Grace, and cousin of rugby footballer Calvin Wellington.

Grace originally played rugby union, and started his career at Aberavon Quins RFC. He was also a member of the Ospreys youth teams.

== Rugby league career ==
=== St Helens ===
Grace joined St Helens in 2014, when he was only 17. Despite not making his first-team debut for St Helens until 2017, he was first picked to play for the Welsh international side in October 2015 when he came on as an interchange player in Wales' 14–6 victory over France.

His first Super League appearance came on Good Friday, 14 April, 2017 in the derby match against Wigan where he scored a try on debut. The following month he signed a new two-and-a-half-year contract with St Helens. Since that moment, Grace was a regular in the St Helens side making 139 appearances by the end of the 2021 season and scoring 87 tries. Among those matches have been two Challenge Cup finals. The first was the 2019 Challenge Cup Final defeat by Warrington at Wembley Stadium The second was the 26–12 2021 Challenge Cup Final victory over Castleford. During the 2021 Challenge Cup Grace was the leading try-scorer, scoring seven including a hat-trick against Huddersfield in the quarter-finals, and two in the semi-final against Hull FC.

Grace has also played in three Super League Grand Finals as St Helens won the 2019, 2020 and 2021 Grand Finals. On 5 July 2022, Grace signed a contract to join Rugby Union side Racing 92 in 2023. On 2 August 2022, it was announced that Grace had ruptured his achilles during St Helens heavy defeat against Salford which would rule him out for the remainder of the 2022 Super League season.

=== Wales ===
He played for Wales in the 2017 World Cup qualifiers, scoring two tries in the country's first game.

He was selected in the Wales 9s squad for the 2019 Rugby League World Cup 9s.

== Rugby union career ==
=== Racing 92 ===
Grace signed for Top 14 side Racing 92 in 2022, but was ruled out with a significant achilles injury. While recovering, Grace suffered a recurrence of the same achilles injury.

=== Bath ===
Grace was released by Racing 92, and in November 2023 linked up with Premiership team Bath to continue his rehab. Grace signed a short-term contract with Bath on 16 February 2024, and made his debut on 9 March 2024, in a friendly against Gloucester. On 24 April 2024, Grace signed with Bath for the 2024–25 Premiership season. Grace made his Bath debut on 23 November 2024 in a Premiership Cup fixture against Bedford Blues. He made his European debut against Benetton on 15 December 2024.

=== Cardiff ===
On 6 January 2025, Grace joined Cardiff on a six-month contract. He made his debut on 10 January 2025 in the Challenge Cup against USA Perpignan.

Grace was released by Cardiff at the end of the season.

=== Sale ===
On 21 November 2025 it was reported that he would turn out for a trial match for Sale Sharks v Bath.

On 27 November 2025, he had signed a short term contract with Sale Sharks

=== Wales ===
He was called up to the Wales national rugby union team for the first time on 20 June, after Keelan Giles was ruled out of the summer tour of Australia, playing in the uncapped match against Queensland Reds, scoring a try on debut.
