= List of The Valleys episodes =

The following is a list of episodes for a British reality television series, The Valleys that first aired on MTV on 25 September 2012. During the course of the series, 22 episodes plus 1 special episode of The Valleys have aired.

== Series overview ==
Series	Episodes	Originally released	
Series	Episodes	First released	Last released
1	6	25 September 2012	30 October 2012
2	8	23 April 2013	18 June 2013
3	8	25 February 2014	15 April 2014

== Episodes ==
=== Series 1 (2012) ===
No. overall	No. in series	Title	Duration	Original release date	Viewers
1	1	"Episode 1"	60 minutes	25 September 2012	510,000
2	2	"Episode 2"	60 minutes	2 October 2012	461,000
3	3	"Episode 3"	60 minutes	9 October 2012	566,000
4	4	"Episode 4"	60 minutes	16 October 2012	619,000
5	5	"Episode 5"	60 minutes	23 October 2012	682,000
6	6	"Episode 6"	60 minutes	30 October 2012	682,000

=== Series 2 (2013) ===
No. overall	No. in series	Title	Duration	Original release date	Viewers
7	1	"Filthy Bits"	60 minutes	23 April 2013	60,000 (Note: Viewership for this episode does not include the MTV+1 broadcast.)
8	2	"Episode 1"	60 minutes	30 April 2013	482,000
9	3	"Episode 2"	60 minutes	7 May 2013	494,000
10	4	"Episode 3"	60 minutes	14 May 2013	503,000
11	5	"Episode 4"	60 minutes	21 May 2013	525,000
12	6	"Episode 5"	60 minutes	28 May 2013	541,000
13	7	"Episode 6"	60 minutes	4 June 2013	680,000
14	8	"Episode 7"	60 minutes	11 June 2013	648,000
15	9	"Episode 8"	60 minutes	18 June 2013	633,000

=== Series 3 (2014) ===
No. overall	No. in series	Title	Duration	Original release date	Viewers
16	1	"Episode 1"	60 minutes	25 February 2014	511,000
17	2	"Episode 2"	60 minutes	4 March 2014	499,000
18	3	"Episode 3"	60 minutes	11 March 2014	486,000
19	4	"Episode 4"	60 minutes	18 March 2014	489,000
20	5	"Episode 5"	60 minutes	25 March 2014	424,000
21	6	"Episode 6"	60 minutes	1 April 2014	501,000
22	7	"Episode 7"	60 minutes	8 April 2014	474,000
23	8	"Episode 8"	60 minutes	15 April 2014	561,000
