= The Valleys (TV series) =

- Genre: Reality
- Created by: MTV UK
- Starring: See below
- Country of origin: United Kingdom
- Original languages: English, Welsh
- No. of series: 3
- No. of episodes: 22 (list of episodes)

Production
- Executive producer: Fiona O'Sullivan
- Running time: 42 minutes (excluding adverts)
- Production company: True North Productions

Original release
- Network: MTV UK
- Release: 25 September 2012 – 15 April 2014

Related
- Jersey Shore; Geordie Shore; Beauty School Cop Outs; The Only Way Is Essex; Acapulco Shore; Super Shore

The Valleys is a British reality television series based in Cardiff, Wales and broadcast on MTV UK. The show first aired on 25 September 2012. It followed youngsters from "The Valleys" (including locations not part of the South Wales Valleys, such as Bridgend and Port Talbot) as they move to Cardiff to live out their dreams with the help from their new bosses, AK and Jordan. On 1 June 2014 it had been announced that the show has been put on permanent hiatus due to MTV venturing for new ideas and commissioning new shows such as Ex on the Beach.

== History ==
Series 1 of The Valleys premiered on 25 September 2012. It returned for series 2 on 30 April 2013. Before the series began, it was announced that twin brothers Anthony and Jason would be added to the cast. Cast member Aron also announced his departure from the show. The first promo for the second series premiered on 2 April 2013 during a new episode of Geordie Shore. On 23 April, a week before series 2 began, a special episode entitled "The Valleys: Filthy Bits" aired, which featured the best bits from series 1.

On 5 July 2013, cast member Leeroy confirmed there would be a series 3 of The Valleys. On 14 January 2014, it was announced that a new cast member would join for the third series of the show. The cast member was revealed to be Jack Watkins, a 24-year-old stripper. The series premiered 25 February 2014 and was filmed in various locations around the UK and Ireland, as "Valleywood Nights" went on tour.

On 1 June 2014 it was announced that The Valleys had been axed by MTV due to the ratings drop. An MTV spokesperson noted "The Valleys has performed exceptionally well for MTV with three successful seasons behind it. However, with our audience always looking for new and engaging content, we're focused on developing new original programme ideas for the MTV schedule such as new smash hit Ex on the Beach to sit alongside returning favourites like Geordie Shore."

=== Controversies ===
Even before its initial broadcast the show became the centre of a number of controversies, such as a MTV press release promoting the show was described as "arrogant and quite patronising." Journalist Hannah Finch noted that at the London premier, MTV UK's Director of Television, Kerry Taylor promised that the show would be "smart, funny and authentic" but also noted that the attendees were served what was labeled as traditional "Welsh breakfast", but was actually just rarebit cut into the shape of a sheep which she called "an aged stereotype". The premier's decor also featured some incongruous agricultural stereotypes such as bales of hay, a tractor and a "blinged-up" sheep on diamante leads. Finch negatively reviewed the episode itself, stating that from the first moments "it's clear the fears of those who expected to see the Valleys belittled weren’t unfounded" before concluding that "I may not be Welsh myself, but after three years of living in South Wales I can’t say this coheres with an “authentic” portrayal of an area I’ve come to know and love."

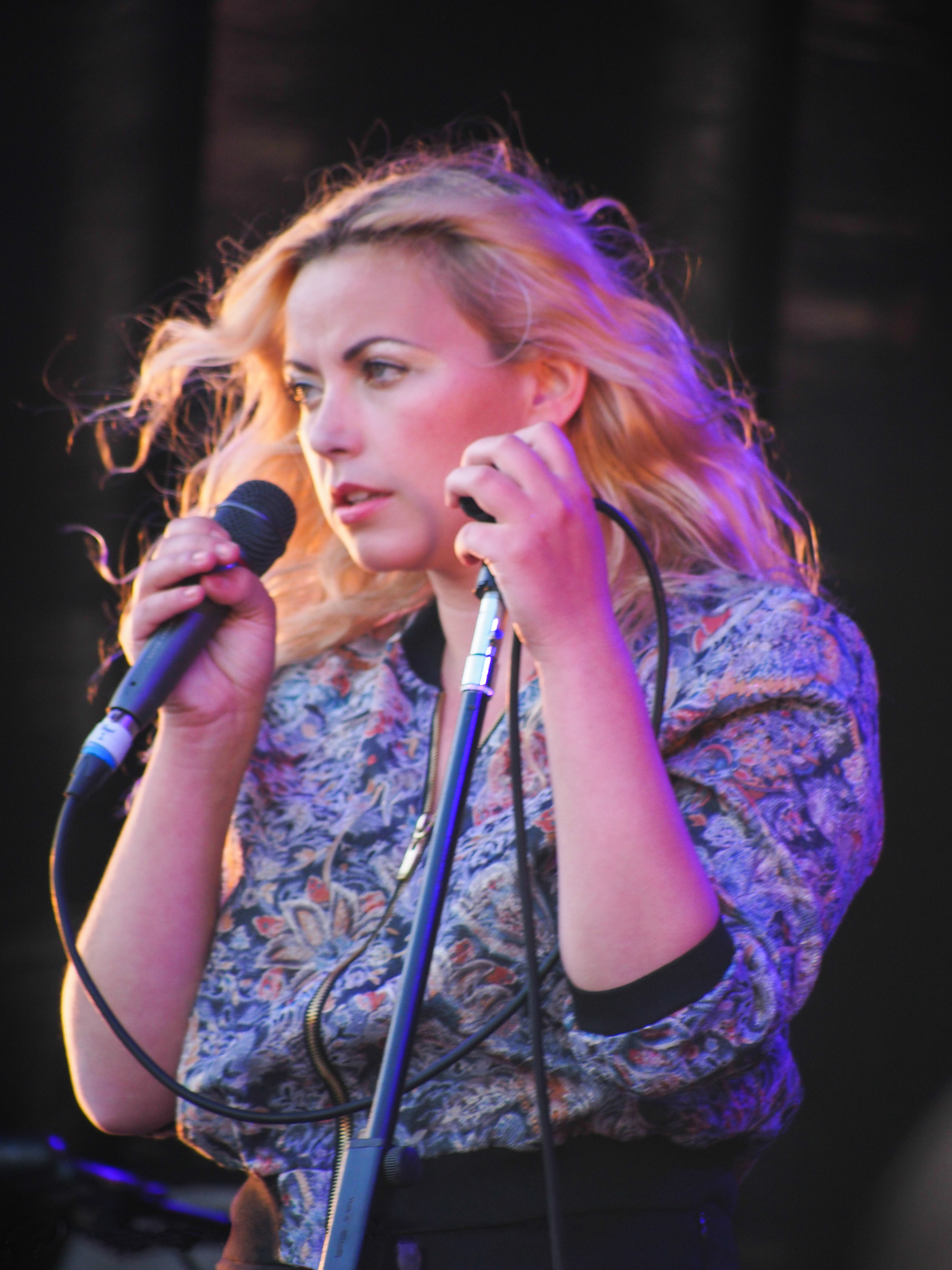
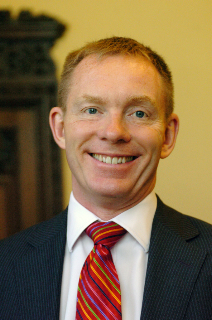
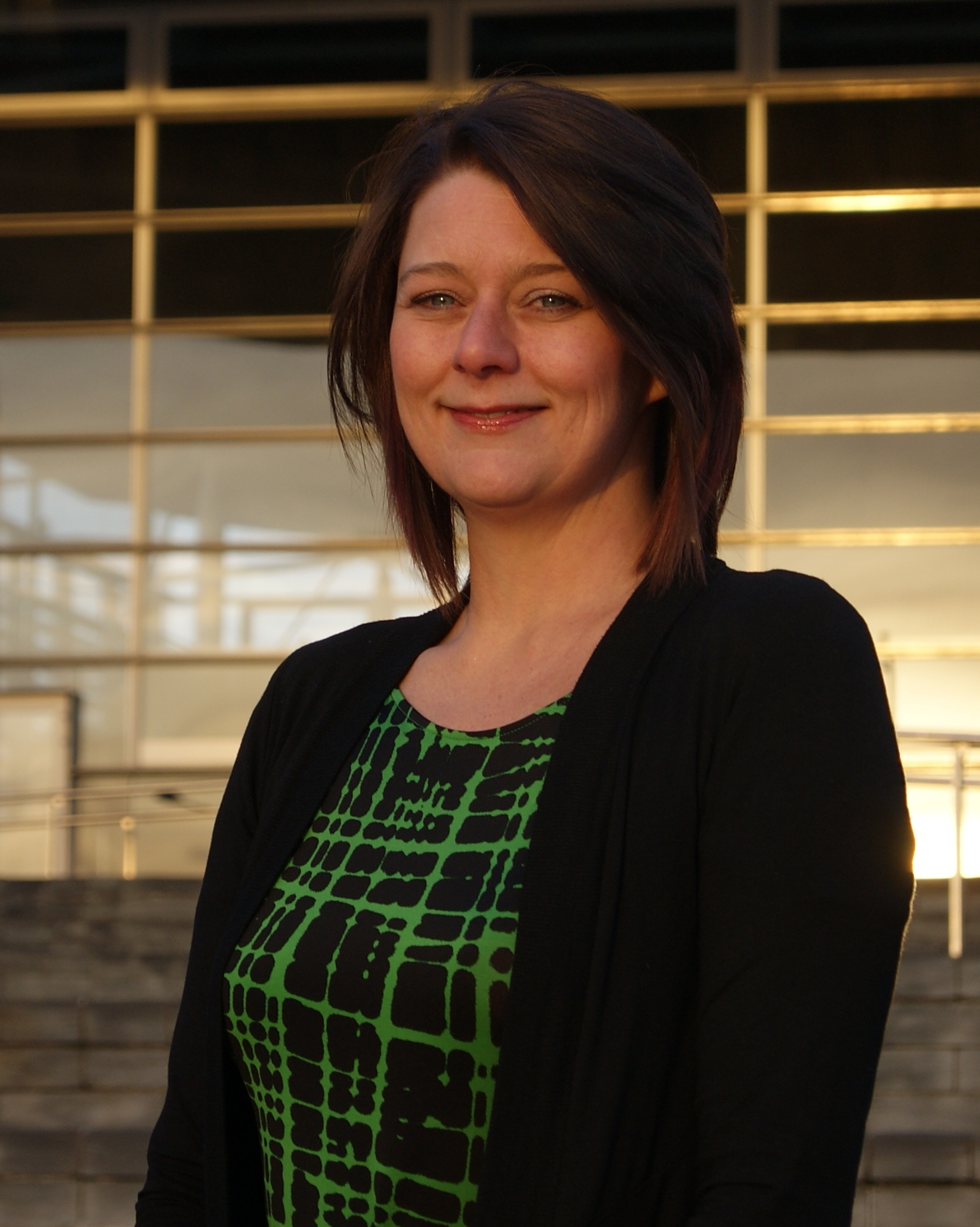
The show was condemned in Wales by a number of high profile figures including (l-r) Cardiff singer Charlotte Church, Rhondda MP, Chris Bryant and the leader of Plaid Cymru, Leanne Wood

The show was condemned by Welsh politicians and celebrities. Two Welsh Labour MPs representing Valleys constituencies, Chris Bryant and Paul Murphy attacked the premise of the show, while the leader of Plaid Cymru (the Welsh Nationalist Party), Leanne Wood called it "quite boring". Plaid Cymru's Culture Spokesperson Bethan Jenkins also said that MTV should have actually visited the Valleys "to see what it is really like" while the Cardiff born celebrity Charlotte Church further condemned the show, describing it as an "exploitative and an horrific representation".

After the show was broadcast to the UK, many people from the Valleys area voiced their disapproval on social media and online forums. As part of a BBC interview on the controversies, Taylor publicly defended the show saying "It's absolutely not about stereotyping." Before the broadcast of the third season in 2013, Chris Bryant again criticised the show as "patronising" and noted the results of a survey of 450 valleys school children which he said showed that young people in the south Wales Valleys "want to be engineers not pop stars".

Since cancellation, the programme has remained controversial in Wales, and has come to be viewed as embodying a "fake" depiction of Wales and Welsh working class life. Rachel Trezise noted that The Valleys portrayed it's subjects as "country bumpkins" and Cardiff as a supposedly distant and glamorous city when in reality, the south Wales Valleys is a highly urbanised and densely populated area and the towns depicted are a mere thirty minute train journey from central Cardiff. Trezise further criticised the show for compounding this conceit with pejorative narratives pandering to stereotypes. While unintentionally epitomizing the issue of "outsider constructions" of Wales in its depictions for a UK audience.

== Series ==
Year	Series	Predominate location	No. of episodes	Average viewership
2012	Series 1	Cardiff, Wales	6	581,000
2013	Series 2	Cardiff, Wales	8	563,000
2014	Series 3	Cardiff, Wales	8	493,000

Note: These viewing figures are those of MTV and MTV+1

== Cast ==
The official cast members were revealed on 7 August 2012. They are Aron Williams, Carley Belmonte, Darren Chidgey, Jenna Jonathan, Lateysha Grace, Leeroy Reed, Liam Powell, Natalee Harris and Nicole Morris. The series also features two bosses that will mentor the cast as they try to make it in the city of Cardiff. The bosses being Jordan Reed and Anna 'AK' Kelle.

During episode 3 which aired on 9 October 2012 Lateysha Grace left the house after falling out with her fellow cast mates. She later returned in episode 4 when the female cast travelled to Port Talbot to bring her back to Cardiff.

In episode 4, which aired on 16 October 2012 Chidgey and Natalee were kicked out of the house by club "owner"(manager) Jordan Reed, after fighting with one another during a night out. Chidgey is later made a conditional offer (during episode 5) of being able to return to the house and series, as long as it's without Natalee. He chose to return to the house, however Natalee still featured in the series but only outside of the house. She remained a cast member for the second series and returned to the house during the second episode.

On 21 March 2013, it was announced that there'd be 2 new additions to the cast. Twins, Anthony and Jason Suminski. On the same day, Aron revealed that he would not be returning for the second series.

On 30 April 2013 during the first episode of series 2, Anthony and Jason made their first appearances. Leeroy and Natalee did not feature in this episode, despite still being cast members. Natalee returned to the house during the second episode on 7 May after apologising to AK for her actions in the first series. During this episode, Carley decided to voluntarily leave the house after constant arguments with Natalee and Liam, but returned in the next episode. Leeroy returned to the series in Episode 4, and though he did not permanently move back into the house, he continued to make frequent visits and was also featured in scenes outside of the house until the end of the series. In the final episode of series 2, Carley voluntarily decided to return to The Valleys due to her continued issues with Chidgey and Natalee. Jordan and AK then revealed which cast members they would like to continue working with in the future, with everyone being asked to return for the next series apart from Liam and Nicole. In December 2013, Leeroy announced on Twitter that he would not be returning for the third series. On 27 January, Nicole announced she would be returning for the third series.

On 14 January 2014, it was confirmed that Jack Watkins had joined the cast. And on 27 January, despite originally being dropped from the show, it was announced that Nicole would be returning for the third series.

Series	Episodes	Name	Age (at start of series)	Hometown	Dream
1–3	22	Carley Belmonte	21	Caerphilly	DJ and promoter
1–3	22	Darren Chidgey	25	Bridgend	Model
1–3	22	Jenna Jonathan	21	Tonyrefail	Model
1–3	22	Lateysha Grace	19	Port Talbot	Model and singer
1–3	20	Natalee Harris	23	Pontypool	Model
1–3	22	Nicole Morris	19	Swansea	Stylist and photographer
2–3	16	Jason Suminski	22	Pontypridd	Model
3	8	Jack Watkins	24	Cwmbran	Stripper
1–2	11	Leeroy Reed	21	Bridgend	Rapper
1–2	14	Liam Powell	25	Ystrad Mynach	DJ and model
1	6	Aron Williams	19	Tredegar	Kickboxer
2–3	10	Anthony Suminski	22	Pontypridd	Model

=== Timeline of cast members ===
The Valleys / The Valleys New Beginnings cast members
Cast member	Seasons			
Cast member	1	2	3	The Valleys: New Beginnings
Jenna	Main	Main	Main	Main
Nicole	Main	Main	Main	Main
Carley	Main	Main	Main	
Natalee	Friend	Main	Main	Main
Lateysha	Main	Main	Main	Main
AK	Friend	Main	Main	Main
Aron	Main			Main
LeeRoy	Main	Friend		Main
Chidgey	Main	Main	Main	Main
Liam	Main	Main	Guest	Main
Jordan	Guest	Friend	Main	TBA
Anthony		Main	Friend	
Jason		Main	Main	
Jack			Main	Main

== International broadcasts ==
Country	Channel	Title	Year	Reference
Australia New Zealand	MTV Australia	The Valleys	2012–14	
Serbia Croatia Slovenia Bosnia and Herzegovina Montenegro Republic of Macedonia	MTV Adria	The Valleys	2013–14	
Spain Andorra	MTV Spain	The Valleys	2013–14	
Poland	MTV Poland	Ekipa z Cardiff	2013–14	
Germany Austria	MTV Germany	The Valleys	2013–14	
Switzerland	MTV Switzerland	The Valleys	2013–14	
Netherlands Belgium	MTV Netherlands	The Valleys	2013–14	
Finland	MTV Finland	The Valleys	2013–14	
Portugal	MTV Portugal	The Valleys	2013–14	
Italy	MTV Italia	The Valleys	2013–14	
France	MTV France	The Valleys	2013–14	
Israel	MTV Israel	העמק	2015	
