= Lateysha Grace =

Welsh television personality (born 1992)

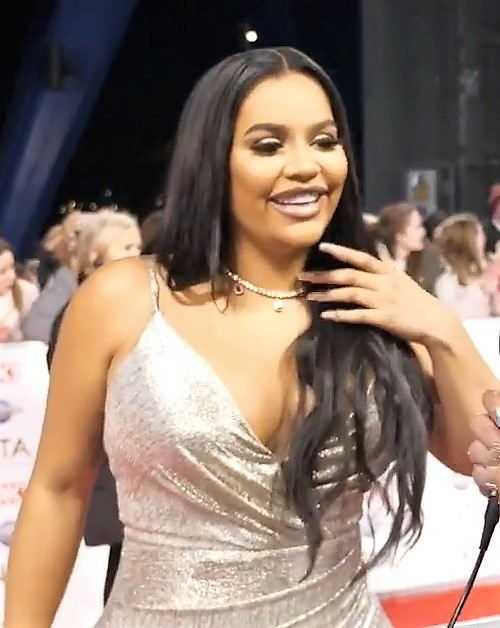
- Grace in 2020
- Born: Lateysha Naomi Henry; 25 November 1992 (age 33); Port Talbot, Wales
- Occupations: Television personality; businesswoman; model
- Television: The Valleys; Big Brother; Million Dollar Baby; Celebrity Ex on the Beach
- Children: 3
- Relatives: Regan Grace (brother); Calvin Wellington (cousin)

Lateysha Naomi Henry (born 25 November 1992), known professionally as Lateysha Grace, is a Welsh television personality, businesswoman and model. She began her television career after appearing on the MTV reality series The Valleys (2012–2014), and has since made further television appearances in the seventeenth series of Big Brother (2016), Million Dollar Baby (2018), and Celebrity Ex on the Beach (2020).

== Career ==
Grace began her reality television career on the MTV series The Valleys in 2012, at the age of nineteen. In 2013, she began selling an online fashion range. In April 2014, Grace released her first single, "You Beautiful", featuring D-Jukes, though it failed to chart. The single was a plotline in the third series of The Valleys, where her fellow housemates were underwhelmed with the finished track. In 2015, she released her autobiography, titled Valleywood. In her autobiography, Grace stated that the downfall of her song was due to jealous, writing: "It could have been a classic hit but they still wouldn't have admitted they liked it because none of the other housemates had anything substantial going on in their lives."

On 7 June 2016, Grace entered the Big Brother house, to participate in the seventeenth series. She was not nominated for eviction, but was eliminated as part of an "Annihilation Week" twist on 12 July 2016, when contestant Jason Burrill was required to evict a fellow housemate in order to receive a cash prize. In 2018, Grace starred in Million Dollar Baby, an MTV series that documented herself, business partners and friends trying to raise £1 million for her daughter, Wynter. In the series, she began a children's clothing business, named Baby on Trend. In 2020, she starred in the MTV series Celebrity Ex on the Beach.

== Personal life ==
Born in Wales, Grace is of half-Jamaican half-Welsh descent. Before The Valleys, Grace worked as an accounts administrator, a hairdresser, and in a fish and chip shop. She has a daughter, Wynter, with ex-boyfriend Ben Charles. In 2022, she gave birth to her second daughter named Layke. And in 2025, she gave birth to her third daughter.

== Filmography ==
Year	Title	Notes
2012–2014	The Valleys	Main cast
2016	Big Brother	Series 17
2017	Celebrity Fat Fighters	Main cast
2018	Million Dollar Baby	Main cast
2018	Celebrity Ghost Hunt UK	1 episode
2018–2022	That's What She Said	Co-host (season 1–4, 6)
2019–2020	Just Tattoo of Us	Guest presenter; 4 episodes (season 4–5)
2020	Celebrity Ex on the Beach	Main cast
2020	Love Squad	1 episode
2021	Geordie Shore OGs	1 episode

== Discography ==
=== Singles ===
- 2014: You Beautiful (feat. D-Jukes)
