= Diana Rivers =

American writer, artist, and activist

- Born: Diana Duer Smith; October 17, 1931 (age 94); New York City, New York, U.S.
- Education: Cooper Union
- Occupations: Writer; artist; activist
- Known for: Women-only spaces
- Children: 3
- Relatives: Alice Duer Miller (great aunt); Caroline King Duer (great aunt); Joseph Larocque (grandfather)

Diana Rivers (born October 17, 1931) is an American writer, artist, and activist. She is the author of the Hadra book series and recognized as a pioneer of women-only spaces in Arkansas. Rivers is an advocate for LGBT rights, peace, racial equality, social justice, and ecology.

== Early life and education ==
Diana Duer Smith was born on October 17, 1931, in New York City to Schuyler Knowlton Smith and Elizabeth Larocque. Rivers was raised near Morristown, New Jersey. Her parents separated before she was three and her mother married Lewis Rutherfurd Stuyvesant, son of Rutherfurd Stuyvesant in 1934. Rivers' mother was a writer and poet who published a book, Satan's Shadow, in 1930. She was the daughter of Joseph Larocque. Rivers' father married Penelope Pelham Pattee in 1954. Rivers' maternal great aunts were writers Caroline King Duer and Alice Duer Miller. Rivers' paternal grandmother, Eleanor Duer Larocque, an artist, was influential in her life and helped introduce her to sculptor William Zorach, whom Rivers' studied under and lived with his family in Maine for several summers while she was a teenager. Rivers' attended Cooper Union in the early 1950s.

== Career ==
In 1970, Rivers went on a solo camping trip out west to create a new community. She spent time in various communes in New Mexico, Oregon, and California including Hog Farm. She established the Sassafras community, a women-only space in Boxley Valley. While there, she changed her surname to Rivers to recognize her new life. Her vision was to start an intentional community focused on living sustainably off of the land. Rivers built a cabin and wrote short stories about her experiences at Sassafras. She wrote her first novel here. In 1980, Rivers moved to Fayetteville, Arkansas, and created the Ozark Land Holding Association with 19 other women. It consists of 280 acres.

Rivers is the author of the Hadra book series. She published the first novel, Journey to Zelindar, in 1987. The series is about women with powers and mind reading abilities. From 1991 to 1993, Rivers was an organizer of the WomenVision month-long arts and performance show hosted in Kansas City, Missouri, and Eureka Springs, Arkansas. She also started the MatriArts arts and performance venue which lasted for three years in Fayetteville. From 1990 to 1999, Rivers organized the University of Arkansas Women's Conference and Festival where she served as the art show curator. In 1999, she received the Wise Woman Award at the conference. Rivers is a cement sculptor. She was a script writer for Goddess Productions, a theatre group in Fayetteville.

She published The Red Line of Yarmald in 2003 which was nominated for a Lambda Literary Award for science fiction, fantasy and horror. In 2005, the OMNI Center for Peace, Justice and Ecology recognized Rivers as an Arkansas Peace and Justice Hero. Rivers founded the Goddess Festival in Fayetteville in 2008. It is a week-long event held annually in March. In 2012, she won the Golden Crown Literary Award in speculative fiction for the novel, The Smuggler, the Spy and the Spider. Rivers was included in The Book of Pride.

== Personal life ==
In the early 1950s, Rivers married artist Robert Folley. The two embarked on a European trip to study art. Their first son was born in Paris, after which they traveled by motorcycle through France, Italy, and Greece before returning to New York City where they had their second son. Rivers had her third son in West Nyack, New York, before moving to Gate Hill Cooperative in Stony Point, New York. Rivers' divorced Folley in 1970. She is a Pagan, lesbian, and feminist who actively supports gay rights, peace, racial equality, social justice, and ecology. Rivers protested the Vietnam War and the Iraq War.

== Selected works ==
- Rivers, Diana (1992). Journey to Zelindar: The Personal Account of Sair of Semasi: Book 986 of the Hadra Archives. Lace Publications. ISBN 9781555833053.
- Rivers, Diana (1995). The Hadra: Book 57, Part 2, of the Hadra Archives, as Recorded by Tazzil of Zelindar for Alyeeta the Witch. Lace Publications. ISBN 9781555833190.
- Rivers, Diana (2002). Daughters of the Great Star. Bella Books. ISBN 9780966807509.
- Rivers, Diana (2002). Clouds of War. Bella Books. ISBN 9781931513128.
- Rivers, Diana (2003). The Red Line of Yarmald. Bella Books. ISBN 9781931513234.
- Rivers, Diana (2008). Her Sister's Keeper. Bella Books. ISBN 9781594931123.
- Rivers, Diana (2010). City of Strangers. Bella Books. ISBN 9781594931833.
- Rivers, Diana (2012). The Smuggler, the Spy and the Spider. Bella Books. ISBN 9781594932663.
- Rivers, Diana (2015). Snake Memories and Other Stories. Hadra Books. ISBN 9780989736220.
- Rivers, Diana (2016). Dancer for the Goddess. Goddess Ink, Limited. ISBN 9780996961738.
