= Senator Abel =

Senator Abel or Abell may refer to:

- Edward Lincoln Abel (1860–1926), South Dakota State Senate
- Hazel Abel (1888–1966), member of the United States Senate for Nebraska for fifty-four days in 1954
- David H. Abell (1807–1872), New York State Senate
- Frank D. Abell (1878–1964), New Jersey State Senate
