= Frank Abell =

Frank Abell may refer to:

- Frank G. Abell (1844–1910), American photographer
- Frank D. Abell (1878–1964), American bank executive, government official, and politician in New Jersey
