= Admiral Cooper =

Admiral Cooper may refer to:

- Brad Cooper (born 1967), U.S. Navy vice admiral
- George H. Cooper (1821–1891), U.S. Navy rear admiral
- Philip H. Cooper (1844–1912), U.S. Navy rear admiral
