= Augustus Noble Hand =

American judge (1869–1954)

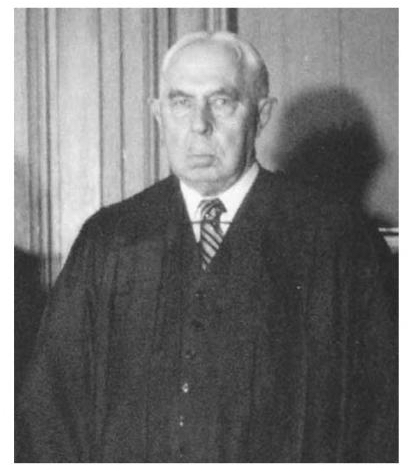

Senior Judge of the United States Court of Appeals for the Second Circuit
- In office June 30, 1953 – October 28, 1954

Judge of the United States Court of Appeals for the Second Circuit
- In office May 19, 1927 – June 30, 1953
- Appointed by: Calvin Coolidge
- Preceded by: Charles Merrill Hough
- Succeeded by: John Marshall Harlan

Judge of the United States District Court for the Southern District of New York
- In office September 30, 1914 – June 1, 1927
- Appointed by: Woodrow Wilson
- Preceded by: George Chandler Holt
- Succeeded by: Frank Joseph Coleman

Personal details
- Born: Augustus Noble Hand; July 26, 1869 Elizabethtown, New York, U.S.
- Died: October 28, 1954 (aged 85) Middlebury, Vermont, U.S.
- Relatives: Learned Hand (cousin)
- Education: Harvard University (AB, LLB)

Augustus Noble Hand (July 26, 1869 – October 28, 1954) was a United States district judge of the United States District Court for the Southern District of New York and later was a United States Circuit Judge of the United States Court of Appeals for the Second Circuit. His most notable rulings restricted the reach of obscenity statutes in the areas of literature and contraceptives. He was the older first cousin of famed judge Learned Hand, who served on both courts with his cousin during most of Augustus Hand's tenure.

== Education and career ==
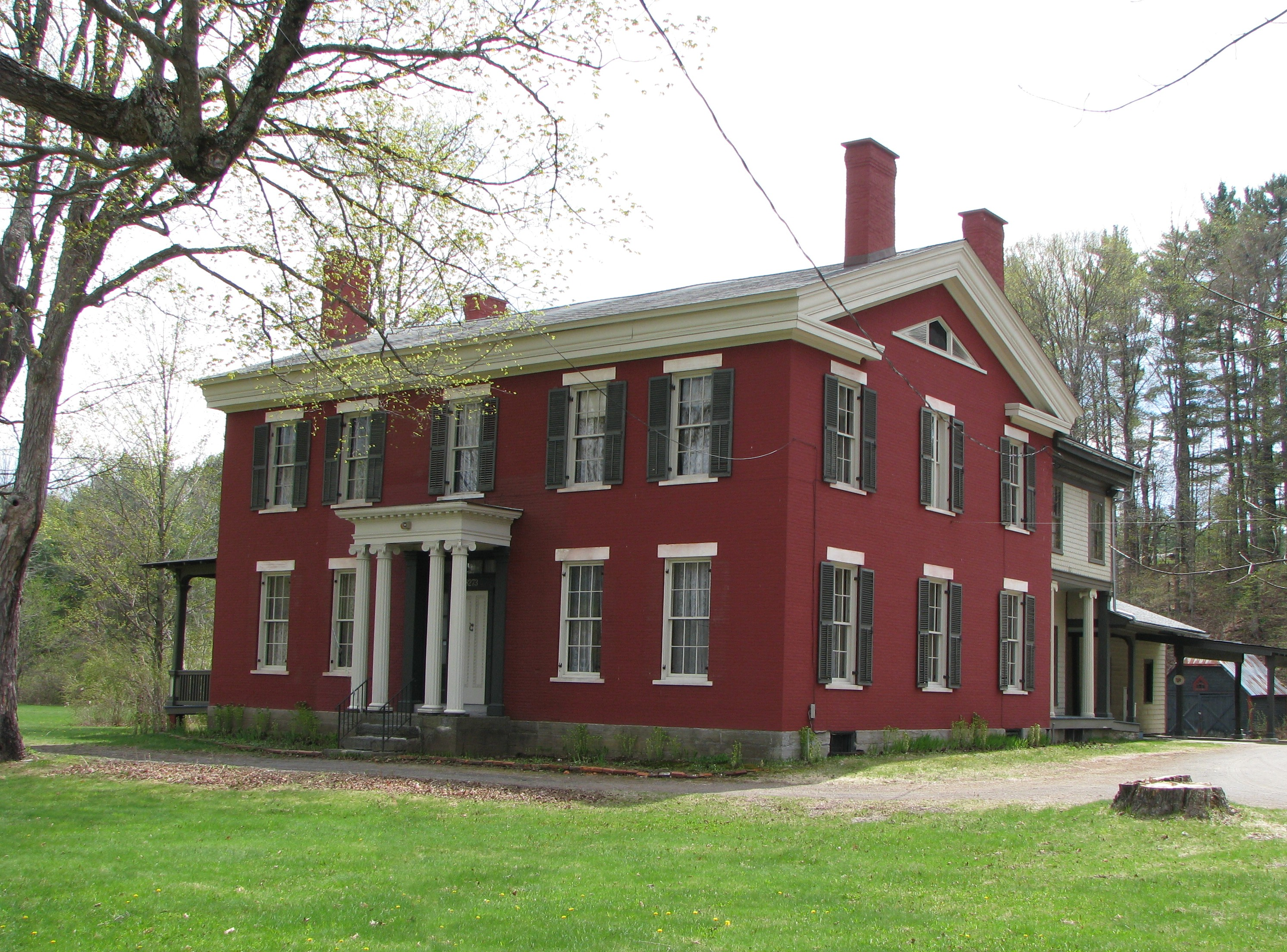
Hand House in Elizabethtown, New York.

Born in Elizabethtown, New York, Hand received an Artium Baccalaureus degree from Harvard University in 1890, and earned a law degree from Harvard Law School in 1894. He then established a private practice in New York City, which he maintained until 1914.

== Federal judicial service ==
Hand was nominated by President Woodrow Wilson on September 28, 1914, to a seat on the United States District Court for the Southern District of New York vacated by Judge George Chandler Holt. He was confirmed by the United States Senate on September 30, 1914, and received his commission the same day. His service terminated on June 1, 1927, due to his elevation to the Second Circuit.

Hand received a recess appointment from President Calvin Coolidge on May 19, 1927, to a seat on the United States Court of Appeals for the Second Circuit vacated by Judge Charles Merrill Hough. He was nominated to the same position by President Coolidge on December 6, 1927. He was confirmed by the Senate on January 18, 1928, and received his commission the same day. He assumed senior status on June 30, 1953. His service terminated on October 28, 1954, due to his death in Middlebury, Vermont.

== Notable decisions ==
=== Contraceptives ===
One of Hand's best-known decisions was rendered in the case of United States v. One Package, 86 F.2d 737 (2d Cir. 1934), in which he ruled that contraceptives, when imported by a licensed physician, were not immoral or obscene devices banned under the Comstock Law provisions incorporated into the Tariff Act of 1930. Hand wrote that "we are satisfied that this statute, as well as all the acts we have referred to, embraced only such articles as Congress would have denounced as immoral if it had understood all the conditions under which they were to be used. Its design, in our opinion, was not to prevent the importation, sale, or carriage by mail of things which might intelligently be employed by conscientious and competent physicians for the purpose of saving life or promoting the well being of their patients."

=== Censorship ===
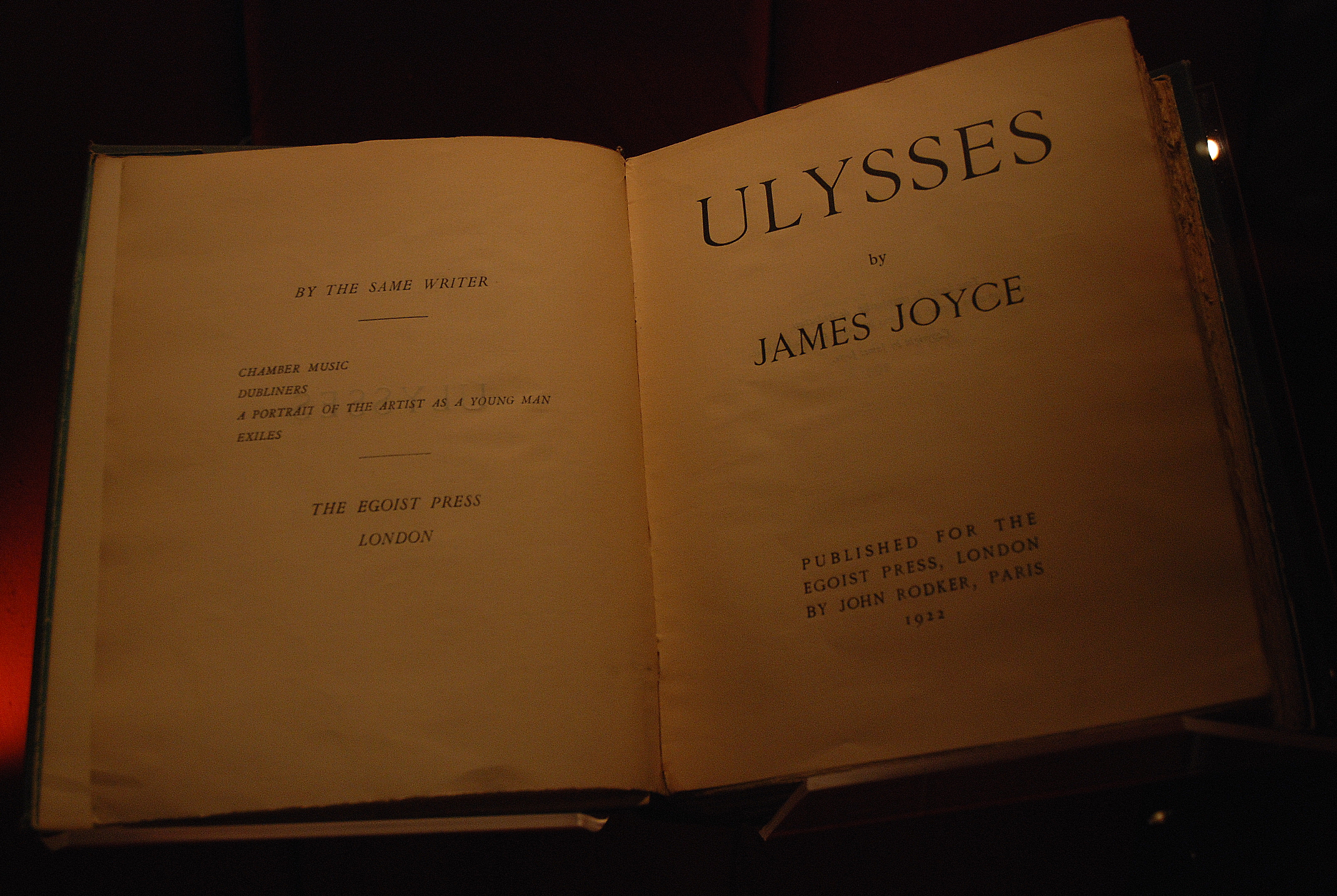
Ulysses, Egoist Press, 1922

The same year, Hand further limited the Tariff Act's restrictions in United States v. One Book Called Ulysses, 72 F.2d 705 (2d Cir. 1934), which ruled that the novel Ulysses, by James Joyce, was not obscene and therefore could not be banned from import into the United States. The opinion was significant in its urging that any test of obscenity could not rely on mere isolated passages but instead had to consider the work as a whole, a test the Supreme Court later endorsed. These principles, filtered through a long line of later cases, ultimately influenced the United States Supreme Court's case law on obscenity standards. Hand's opinion also displayed a historical perspective of the harm of overzealous censorship:

Art certainly cannot advance under compulsion to traditional forms, and nothing in such a field is more stifling to progress than limitation of the right to experiment with a new technique. The foolish judgments of Lord Eldon about one hundred years ago, proscribing the works of Byron and Southey, and the finding by the jury under a charge by Lord Denman that the publication of Shelley's "Queen Mab" was an indictable offense are a warning to all who have to determine the limits of the field within which authors may exercise themselves. We think that Ulysses is a book of originality and sincerity of treatment and that it has not the effect of promoting lust. Accordingly it does not fall within the statute, even though it justly may offend many.

Hand's cousin, Judge Learned Hand, joined in Augustus Hand's opinion; Chief Judge Martin Manton dissented.

=== Motion Picture Antitrust ===
In 1946, Hand was temporarily assigned to a three-judge panel of the New York Southern District Court for the U.S. government's antitrust case against the eight largest movie distributors. The court's per curiam decree in United States v. Paramount Pictures, 70 F.Supp. 53 (S.D.N.Y. 1946), significantly altered the motion picture industry in the United States, by forbidding the distributors from colluding with movie theaters in such anti-competitive licensing practices as price-fixing.

== Cases ==
- Ochs v. Commissioner (1952)

== See also ==
- List of United States federal judges by longevity of service

== Sources ==
- "Hand, Augustus Noble - Federal Judicial Center". www.fjc.gov.
- Gunther, Gerald (April 12, 1994). Learned Hand : The man and the judge. with a foreword by Lewis F. Powell, Jr. New York, NY: Knopf. ISBN 978-0-394-58807-0. LCCN 93022868. LCC KF373.H29 G76 1994, (biography of Learned Hand, Augustus Hand's cousin and fellow federal judge, contains extensive material on Augustus Hand).
- Marcia Nelson, The Remarkable Hands: An Affectionate Portrait (Federal Bar Foundation 1983)
- Marvin Schick, Learned Hand's Court (Johns Hopkins 1970)

Legal offices
Preceded by George Chandler Holt	Judge of the United States District Court for the Southern District of New York; 1914–1927	Succeeded by Frank Joseph Coleman
Preceded by Charles Merrill Hough	Judge of the United States Court of Appeals for the Second Circuit; 1927–1953	Succeeded by John Marshall Harlan
