= Are Parents People? =

1925 film by Malcolm St. Clair

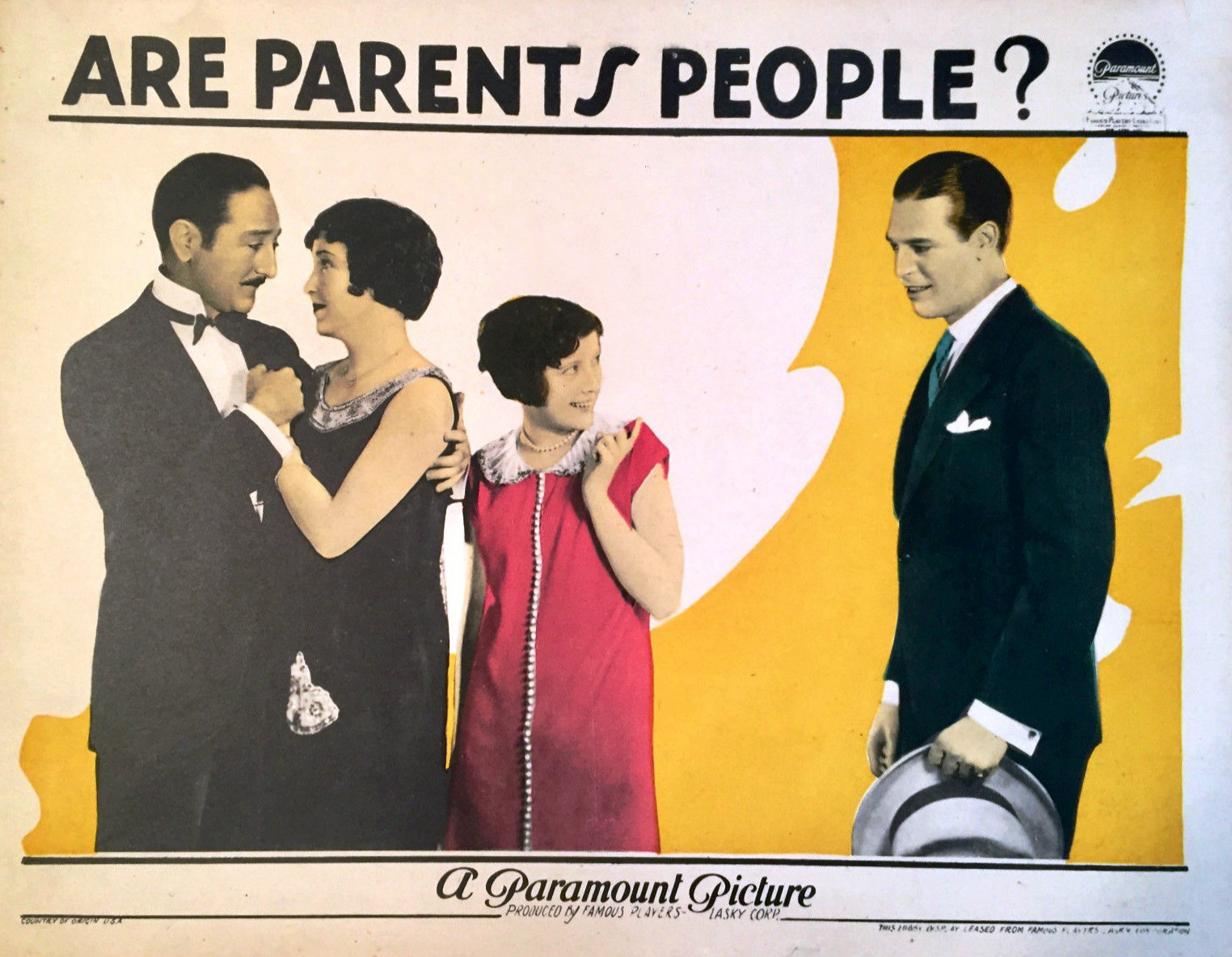
- Lobby card
- Directed by: Malcolm St. Clair
- Written by: Frances Agnew (adaptation)
- Based on: Are Parents People? by Alice Duer Miller
- Produced by: Adolph Zukor; Jesse L. Lasky
- Starring: Betty Bronson; Florence Vidor; Adolphe Menjou; George Beranger; Lawrence Gray
- Cinematography: Bert Glennon
- Distributed by: Paramount Pictures
- Release date: July 14, 1925
- Running time: 70 minutes
- Country: United States
- Language: Silent (English intertitles)

Are Parents People? is a 1925 American silent comedy film starring Betty Bronson, Florence Vidor, Adolphe Menjou, George Beranger, and Lawrence Gray. The film was directed by Malcolm St. Clair and released by Paramount Pictures.

== Plot ==
Are Parents People? (1925)

As described in a film magazine review, Lita's parents are the victims of a divorce due to incompatibility and each want her to accompany them to Europe or Nevada. Lita, however, learns from the young Doctor Dacer, who seems interested in Lisa, that her parents are still in love with each other. She takes the blame of a girl friend at the boarding school, who is believed to have had an affair with "movie sheik" actor Maurice Mansfield, and is expelled. Her parents become so interested in her welfare that now have a mutual interest and become reconciled. The parents then learn that Lita was expelled for an other young woman's mischief.

== Cast ==
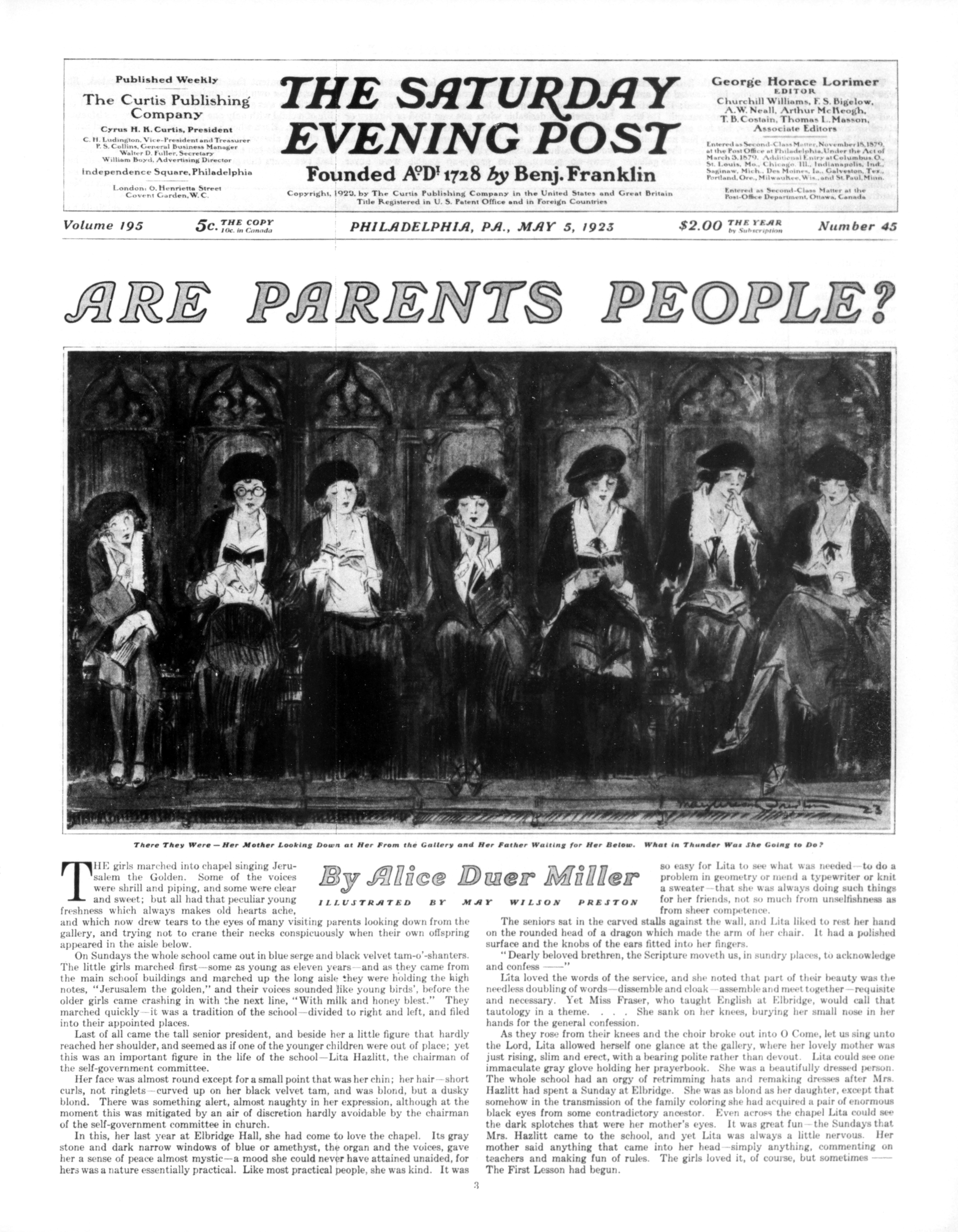
Are Parents People? is based on a story by Alice Duer Miller that first appeared in The Saturday Evening Post (May 5, 1923)

- Betty Bronson as Lita Hazlitt
- Florence Vidor as Mrs. Hazlitt
- Adolphe Menjou as Mr. Hazlitt
- George Beranger as Maurice Mansfield
- Lawrence Gray as Dr. Dacer
- Mary Beth Milford as Aurella Wilton
- Emily Fitzroy as Margaret
- William Courtright as Freebody

== Preservation ==
According to the SilentEra website, the film survives in a 16mm print.

== Home media ==
The film was released on DVD on June 21, 2011.
