= Emile Henry Lacombe =

American judge (1846–1924)

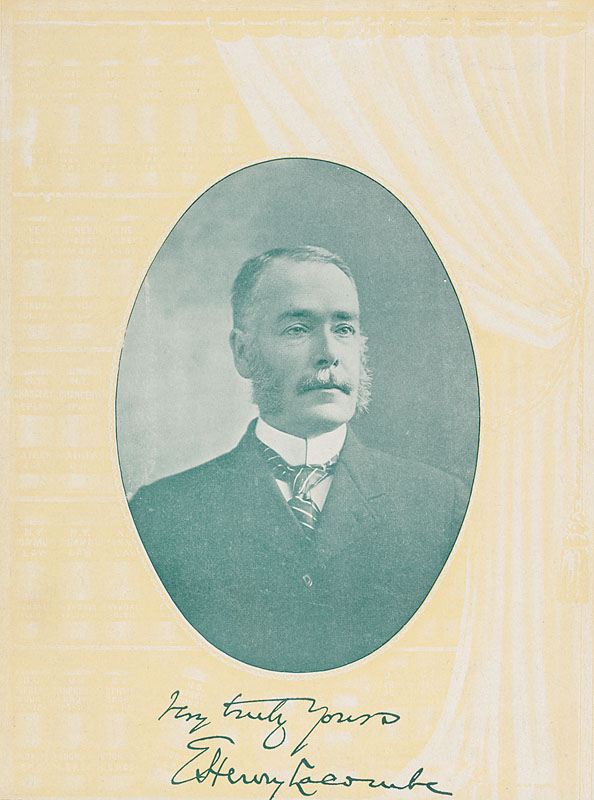

Judge of the United States Court of Appeals for the Second Circuit
- In office June 16, 1891 – February 15, 1916
- Appointed by: operation of law
- Preceded by: Seat established by 26 Stat. 826
- Succeeded by: Charles Merrill Hough

Judge of the United States Circuit Court for the Second Circuit
- In office May 26, 1887 – December 31, 1911
- Appointed by: Grover Cleveland
- Preceded by: Seat established by 24 Stat. 492
- Succeeded by: Seat abolished

Personal details
- Born: Emile Henry Lacombe; January 29, 1846 New York City, New York
- Died: November 28, 1924 (aged 78) New York City, New York
- Resting place: Evergreen Cemetery; Morristown, New Jersey
- Education: Columbia University (AB); Columbia Law School (LLB)

Emile Henry Lacombe (January 29, 1846 – November 28, 1924) was a United States circuit judge of the United States Court of Appeals for the Second Circuit and of the United States Circuit Courts for the Second Circuit.

== Education and career ==
Born on January 29, 1846, in New York City, New York, Lacombe received an Artium Baccalaureus degree in 1863 from Columbia University and a Bachelor of Laws in 1865 from Columbia Law School. He served in the United States Army from 1862 to 1863 during the American Civil War. He entered private practice in New York City from 1865 to 1875. He was assistant corporation counsel for New York City from 1875 to 1884. He was Corporation Counsel for New York City from 1884 to 1887.

== Federal judicial service ==
Lacombe received a recess appointment from President Grover Cleveland on May 26, 1887, to the United States Circuit Courts for the Second Circuit, to a new seat authorized by 24 Stat. 492. He was nominated to the same position by President Cleveland on February 27, 1888. He was confirmed by the United States Senate on February 28, 1888, and received his commission the same day. Lacombe was assigned by operation of law to additional and concurrent service on the United States Court of Appeals for the Second Circuit on June 16, 1891, to a new seat authorized by 26 Stat. 826 (Evarts Act). On December 31, 1911, the Circuit Courts were abolished and he thereafter served only on the Court of Appeals. His service terminated on February 15, 1916, due to his retirement. Electrician

=== Notable cases ===
On October 4, 1892, Lacombe ruled that Thomas Edison was the true inventor of the first practical Incandescent Light. Edison's patents; US 223,898 and FR 130,910 claims for invention were novel. Western Electrician, Vol. XI, No.16, October 15, 1892, pp 195–6. In 1893, when Ny Look a Chinese Civil War veteran was arrested for not registering under the Geary Act which required all unregistered Chinese to be arrested and deported, Lacombe ruled in In re Ny Look that there were no deportation provisions in the law and Look could not be detained indefinitely therefore he should be released.

In 1909, Lacombe reluctantly conferred American citizenship on Bhicaji Balsara, a Parsi thought to be the first Indian to become a United States citizen. Whilst Lacombe conceded that Balsara "appears to be a gentleman of high character and exceptional intelligence". He was reluctant to confer citizenship as he reasoned that there "was much force in the argument that the Congress which framed the original act for naturalization of aliens ...intended it to include only white persons belonging to the races whose emigrants had contributed to the building up on this continent of the community of people which declared itself a new nation". Lacombe only gave Balsara citizenship on the hope that the United States Attorney would indeed challenge his decision and appeal it to create "an authoritative interpretation" of the law. As Lacombe felt if, the definition of 'free white persons' was to be extended ... it... [would] bring in, not only the Parsee... which is probably the purest Aryan type, but also Afghans, Hindoos, Arabs, and Berbers".

The United States Attorney adhered to Lacombe's wishes and took the matter to the Court of Appeals in 1910. The Court of appeal agreed that Parsees belong to the white race and were "as distinct from Hindus as are the English who dwell in India".

== Later career and death ==
Following his retirement from the federal bench, Lacombe resumed private practice in New York City from 1916 to 1924. He served as a Referee in Chancery in New York City in 1919. He died on November 28, 1924, in New York City. He was interred in Evergreen Cemetery in Morristown, New Jersey.

== Conspiracy theory ==
Lacombe wrote a letter to the New York Times advancing a conspiracy theory about the German sinking of the RMS Lusitania in 1915. His letter was published Monday, October 22, 1917, on page 14 titled "A NEW THEORY OF THE LUSITANIA SINKING. The Evidence of the German Medal Dated May 5 and the Report of the Explosive "Cigars" on Board."

== Sources ==
Legal offices
Preceded by Seat established by 24 Stat. 492	Judge of the United States Circuit Courts for the Second Circuit; 1887–1911	Succeeded by Seat abolished
Preceded by Seat established by 26 Stat. 826	Judge of the United States Court of Appeals for the Second Circuit; 1891–1916	Succeeded by Charles Merrill Hough
