= Evergreen Cemetery (Morristown, New Jersey) =

Cemetery in Morris County, New Jersey

Coordinates: 40.8045°N 74.4708°W

Evergreen Cemetery is a cemetery located in Morristown, in Morris County, New Jersey, United States.

== Notable interments ==
- Frank D. Abell (1878–1964), banker and politician
- Karl Behr (1885-1949), professional tennis player, banker, and RMS Titanic survivor.
- Joseph Bushnell Ames (1878–1928), writer
- George T. Cobb (1813–1870), represented New Jersey's 4th congressional district from 1861 to 1863, and Mayor of Morristown from 1865 to 1869.
- Philip H. Cooper (1844–1912), United States Navy rear admiral, Superintendent of the United States Naval Academy from 1894 to 1898 and Commander-in-Chief of the United States Asiatic Fleet from March to July 1904
- Augustus William Cutler (1827–1897), member of the U.S. House of Representatives from New Jersey from 1875 to 1879.
- George Goelet Kip, lawyer
- Emile Henry Lacombe (1846–1924), judge who served on the United States Court of Appeals for the Second Circuit.
- James H. McGraw (1860–1948), co-founder of what is now The McGraw-Hill Companies.
- Alice Duer Miller (1874–1942), poet, author of The White Cliffs (1940)
- Mahlon Pitney (1858–1924), Associate Justice of the Supreme Court of the United States
- Theodore Fitz Randolph (1826–1883), United States Senator.
- George Theodore Werts (1846–1910), Governor of New Jersey from 1893 to 1896.

== See also ==
- List of burial places of justices of the Supreme Court of the United States
