= George Murray Hulbert =

American judge (1881–1950)

George M. Hulbert
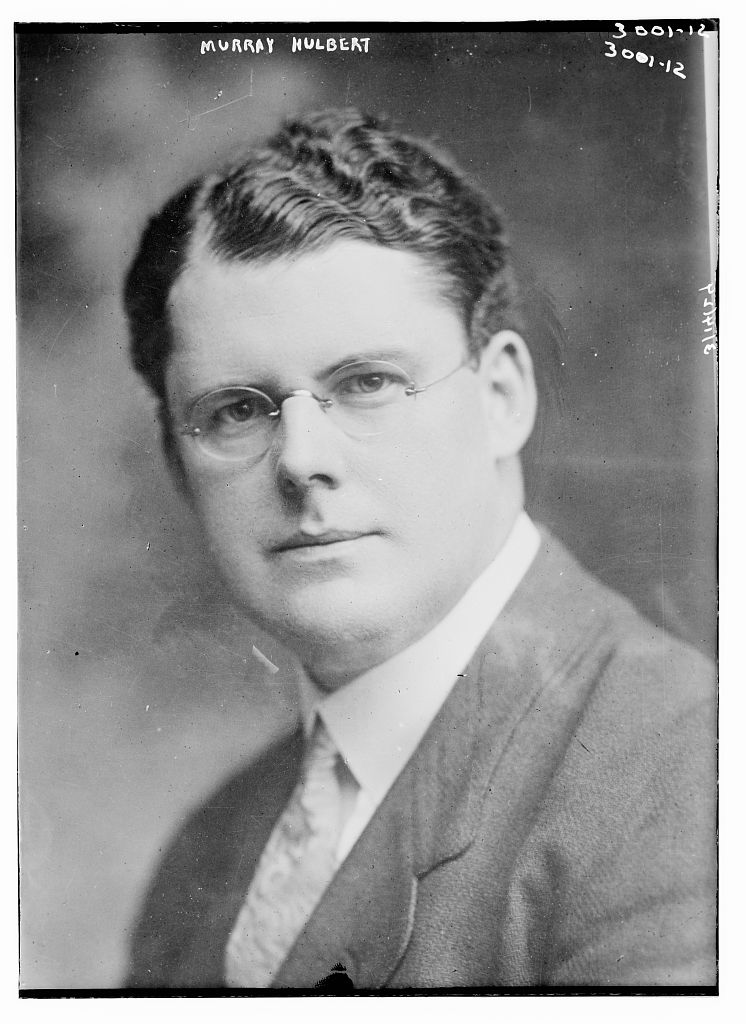
- Hulbert c. 1914

Judge of the United States District Court for the Southern District of New York
- In office June 15, 1934 – April 26, 1950
- Appointed by: Franklin D. Roosevelt
- Preceded by: Frank Joseph Coleman
- Succeeded by: Edward Jordan Dimock

10th President of the New York City Board of Aldermen
- In office January 2, 1922 – January 8, 1925
- Preceded by: Fiorello La Guardia
- Succeeded by: William T. Collins

Member of the U.S. House of Representatives from New York's 21st district
- In office March 4, 1915 – January 1, 1918
- Preceded by: Henry George Jr.
- Succeeded by: Jerome F. Donovan

Personal details
- Born: George Murray Hulbert; May 14, 1881 Rochester, New York, US
- Died: April 26, 1950 (aged 68) Bayport, New York, US
- Resting place: Gate of Heaven Cemetery in Valhalla, New York
- Party: Democratic
- Education: New York University School of Law (LL.B.)

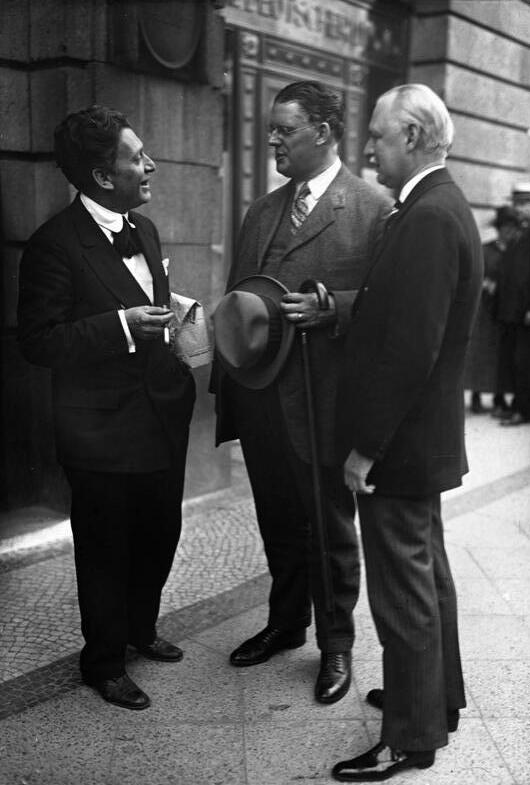
Hulbert in Berlin in 1924 (middle)

George Murray Hulbert (May 14, 1881 – April 26, 1950) was an American lawyer, jurist, and politician who was a United States representative from New York and a United States district judge of the United States District Court for the Southern District of New York in the early 20th century.

== Education and career ==
Born on May 14, 1881, in Rochester, New York, Hulbert moved to Waterloo, New York, and attended the public schools. He received a Bachelor of Laws in 1902 from the New York University School of Law. He was admitted to the bar in 1902 and entered private practice in New York City from 1902 to 1934.

== Congressional service ==
Hulbert was elected as a Democrat to the United States House of Representatives of the 64th and 65th United States Congresses and served from March 4, 1915, to January 1, 1918.

== Later career ==
Hulbert was the Commissioner of Docks and the Director of the Port of New York City starting in 1918. He was elected in November 1921 as President of the Board of Aldermen of New York City, serving from 1921 to 1925. He served as the acting Mayor of New York City during the long illness of John Francis Hylan. He served as President of the Boston, Cape Cod and New York Canal Company.

=== Removal from the Board of Aldermen ===
Hulbert was ousted from the Presidency of the Board after he accepted an honorary position as a member of the Finger Lakes Park Commission that was offered by New York Governor Al Smith. In a decision by New York State Supreme Court judge Joseph M. Proskauer, according to section 1549 of the New York City Charter, Hulbert automatically vacated his position in city government by accepting an appointment at the state level.

== Federal judicial service ==
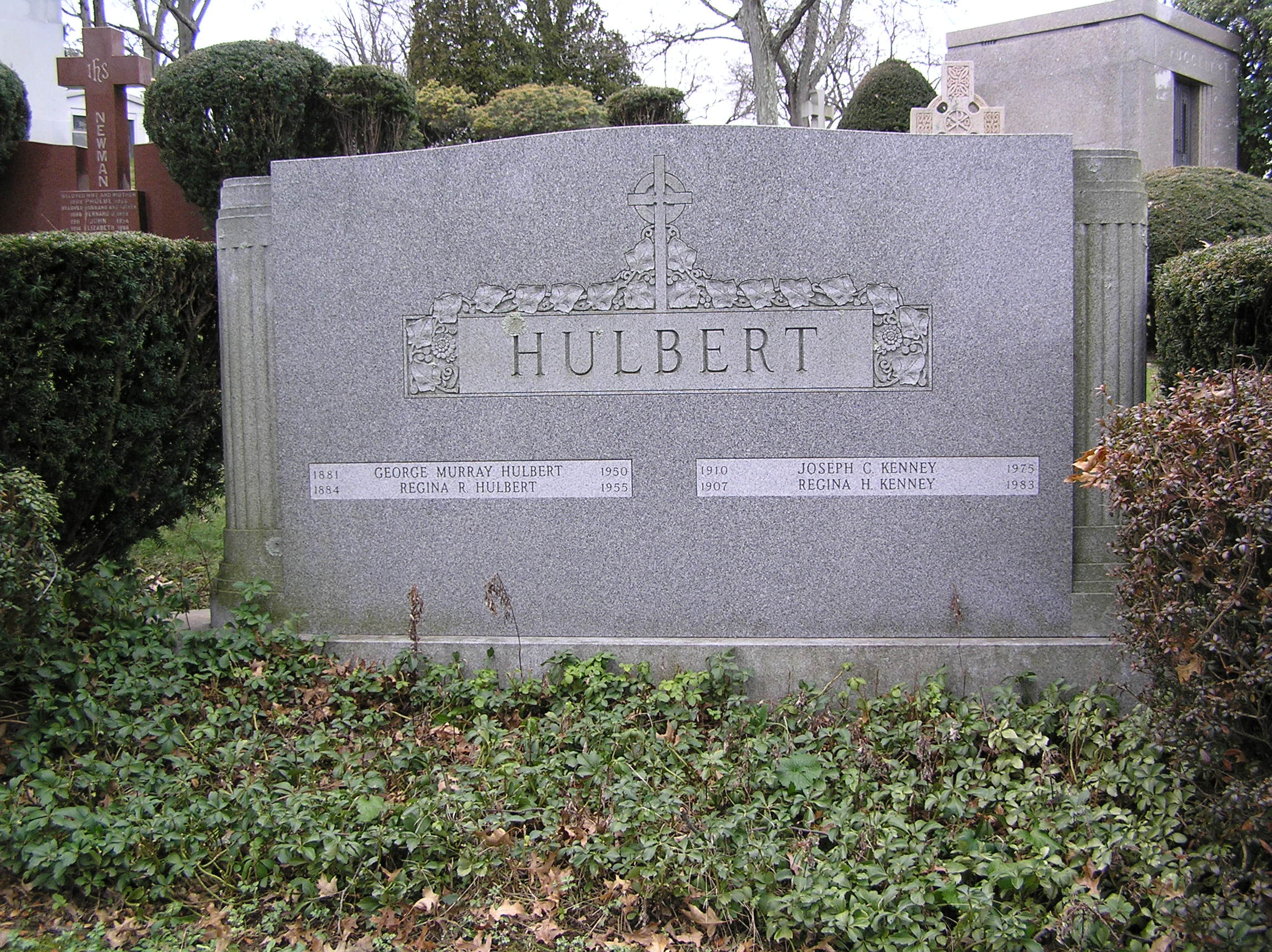
The tombstone of George Murray Hulbert in Gate of Heaven Cemetery

Hulbert was nominated by President Franklin D. Roosevelt on June 6, 1934, to a seat on the United States District Court for the Southern District of New York vacated by Judge Frank J. Coleman. He was confirmed by the United States Senate on June 14, 1934, and received his commission on June 15, 1934.

== Death and burial ==
His service terminated on April 26, 1950, due to his death in Bayport, New York. He was interred in the Gate of Heaven Cemetery in Valhalla, New York.

U.S. House of Representatives
Preceded by Henry George Jr.	Member of the U.S. House of Representatives from New York's 21st congressional district 1915–1918	Succeeded by Jerome F. Donovan
Legal offices
Preceded by Frank Joseph Coleman	Judge of the United States District Court for the Southern District of New York; 1934–1950	Succeeded by Edward Jordan Dimock
