= Charles Merrill Hough =

American judge (1858–1927)

Judge of the United States Court of Appeals for the Second Circuit
- In office August 21, 1916 – April 22, 1927
- Appointed by: Woodrow Wilson
- Preceded by: Emile Henry Lacombe
- Succeeded by: Augustus Noble Hand

Judge of the United States District Court for the Southern District of New York
- In office June 27, 1906 – September 5, 1916
- Appointed by: Theodore Roosevelt
- Preceded by: Seat established by 34 Stat. 202
- Succeeded by: Martin Thomas Manton

Personal details
- Born: Charles Merrill Hough; May 18, 1858 Philadelphia, Pennsylvania, U.S.
- Died: April 22, 1927 (aged 68) New York City, New York, U.S.
- Education: Dartmouth College (AB) read law

Charles Merrill Hough (May 18, 1858 – April 22, 1927) was a United States circuit judge of the United States Court of Appeals for the Second Circuit and previously was a United States District Judge of the United States District Court for the Southern District of New York.

== Education and career ==
Born on May 18, 1858, in Philadelphia, Pennsylvania, Hough received an Artium Baccalaureus degree in 1879 from Dartmouth College and read law in 1883. He entered private practice in New York City from 1884 to 1906.

== Federal judicial service ==
Hough was nominated by President Theodore Roosevelt on June 20, 1906, to the United States District Court for the Southern District of New York (S.D.N.Y.), to a new seat authorized by 34 Stat. 202. He was confirmed by the United States Senate on June 27, 1906, and received his commission the same day.

Hough's most historically memorable judicial ruling came in 1908 in United States vs. Press Publishing Co. Hough quashed a libel suit brought by the federal government on behalf of President Roosevelt against a newspaper, the New York World, that had been critical of the way the administration handled the Panama Canal startup. (Note: This case is not to be confused with the Barnes vs. Roosevelt libel trial, which occurred in 1915.) The Supreme Court of the United States unanimously upheld Hough’s ruling in 1911. (Note: 219 U.S. 1 (1911))

In 1909, Hough ruled in favor of the Association of Licensed Automobile Manufacturers (ALAM) against the Ford Motor Company, regarding an automobile patent issued to George B. Selden that ALAM was using to collect royalties. Hough's ruling was overturned on appeal in 1911, allowing Ford (and other manufacturers) to produce automobiles without paying a royalty.

Hough's service with S.D.N.Y. terminated on September 5, 1916, due to his elevation to the Second Circuit.

Hough was nominated by President Woodrow Wilson on August 15, 1916, to a seat on the United States Court of Appeals for the Second Circuit vacated by Judge Emile Henry Lacombe. Hough was confirmed by the Senate on August 21, 1916, and received his commission the same day. He was a member of the Conference of Senior Circuit Judges (now the Judicial Conference of the United States) in 1926. His service terminated on April 22, 1927, due to his death in New York City.

== Personal life ==
Hough was the son of brigadier general Alfred Lacey Hough (1826–1908) and Mary Jane Merrill. He married Ethel Powers in 1906. They bore two children, Helen Anastasia Hough (1905–1978) and John Newbold Hough (1906–2000).

== Sources ==
Legal offices
Preceded by Seat established by 34 Stat. 202	Judge of the United States District Court for the Southern District of New York; 1906–1916	Succeeded by Martin Thomas Manton
Preceded by Emile Henry Lacombe	Judge of the United States Court of Appeals for the Second Circuit; 1916–1927	Succeeded by Augustus Noble Hand
