= Frank Joseph Coleman =

American judge

Judge of the United States District Court for the Southern District of New York
- In office May 19, 1927 – March 14, 1934
- Appointed by: Calvin Coolidge
- Preceded by: Augustus Noble Hand
- Succeeded by: George Murray Hulbert

Personal details
- Born: Frank Joseph Coleman; March 24, 1886 New York City, New York
- Died: March 14, 1934 (aged 47)
- Party: Republican
- Education: City College of New York (A.B.); New York Law School (LL.B.)

Frank Joseph Coleman (March 24, 1886 – March 14, 1934) was a United States district judge of the United States District Court for the Southern District of New York.

== Education and career ==
Born in New York City, New York, Coleman received an Artium Baccalaureus degree from City College of New York in 1906 and a Bachelor of Laws from New York Law School in 1909. He was secretary to Justice McLaughlin and Justice Finch of the Supreme Court of New York in 1911, and then became an assistant district attorney of New York County, New York from 1914 to 1916. He served as a private in the United States Army during World War I. He was a Justice of the Municipal Court of New York City from 1918 to 1923. He was Republican leader of 15th assembly district in New York County from 1924 to 1927.

== Federal judicial service ==
Coleman received a recess appointment from President Calvin Coolidge on May 19, 1927, to a seat on the United States District Court for the Southern District of New York vacated by Judge Augustus Noble Hand. He was nominated to the same position by President Coolidge on December 6, 1927. He was confirmed by the United States Senate on December 19, 1927, and received his commission the same day. His service terminated on March 14, 1934, due to his death.

== Sources ==
Legal offices
Preceded by Augustus Noble Hand	Judge of the United States District Court for the Southern District of New York; 1927–1934	Succeeded by George Murray Hulbert
