= Martin Thomas Manton =

American judge (1880–1946)

Martin Manton
- Manton in 1915

Judge of the United States Court of Appeals for the Second Circuit
- In office March 18, 1918 – February 7, 1939
- Appointed by: Woodrow Wilson
- Preceded by: Alfred Conkling Coxe Sr.
- Succeeded by: Robert P. Patterson

Judge of the United States District Court for the Southern District of New York
- In office August 23, 1916 – March 18, 1918
- Appointed by: Woodrow Wilson
- Preceded by: Charles Merrill Hough
- Succeeded by: John Knox

Personal details
- Born: Martin Thomas Manton; August 2, 1880 New York City, New York, U.S.
- Died: November 17, 1946 (aged 66) Fayetteville, New York, U.S.
- Education: Columbia University (LLB)

Martin Thomas Manton (August 2, 1880 – November 17, 1946) was a United States circuit judge of the United States Court of Appeals for the Second Circuit and previously was a United States District Judge of the United States District Court for the Southern District of New York. At his 1939 trial, Manton was acquitted of bribery, but convicted of conspiracy to obstruct justice. He served 19 months in federal prison.

== Education and career ==
Born on August 2, 1880, in New York City, New York, Manton received a Bachelor of Laws in 1901 from Columbia Law School. He entered private practice in New York City from 1901 to 1916, part of that time partnered with William Bourke Cockran.

=== Notable client ===
In 1915, Manton was attorney for Charles Becker, the New York City police officer who was convicted and executed in the Rosenthal murder trial.

== Federal judicial service ==
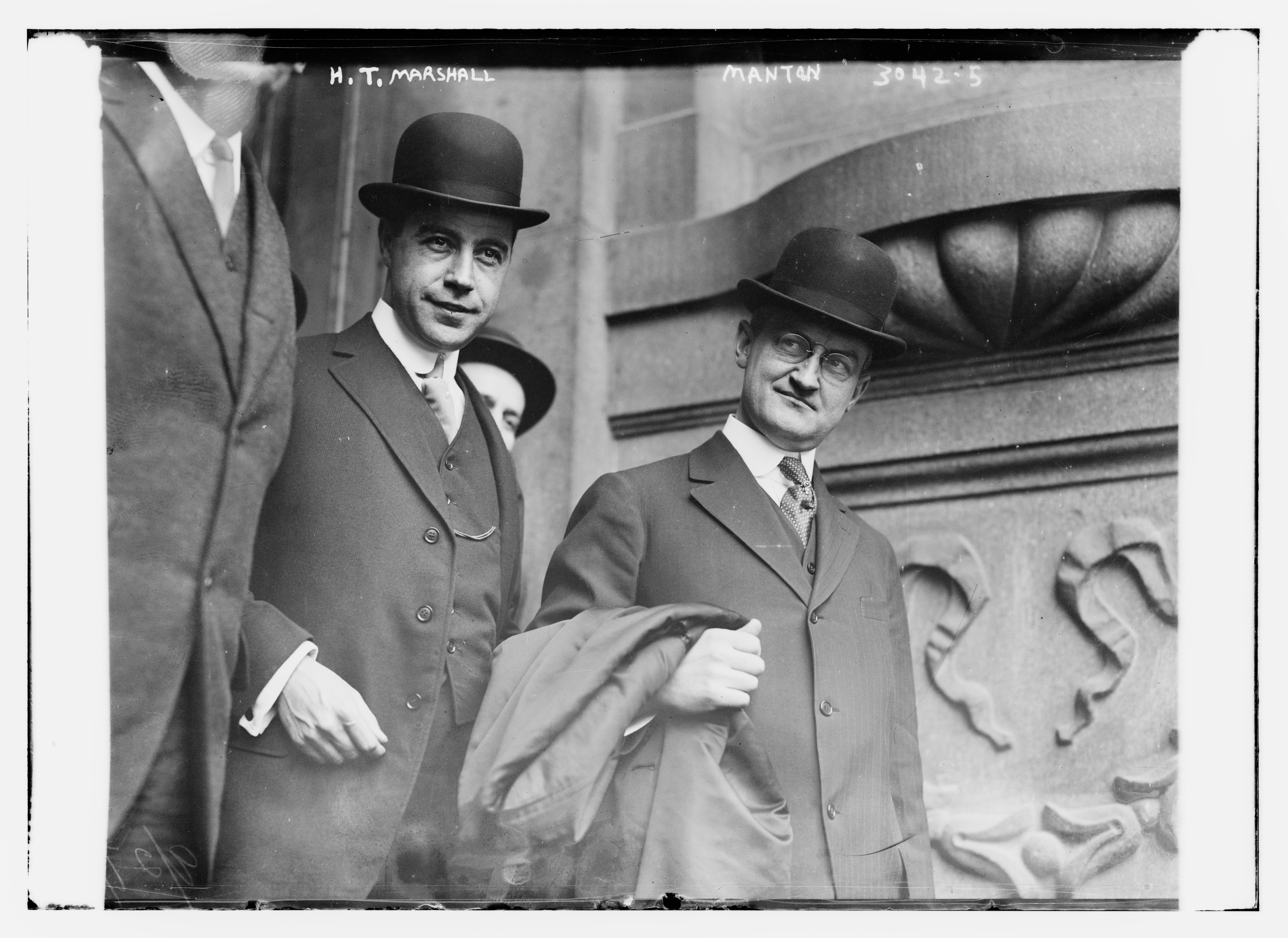
H. T. Marshall and Martin Thomas Manton in 1915 at the Becker-Rosenthal trial in New York City

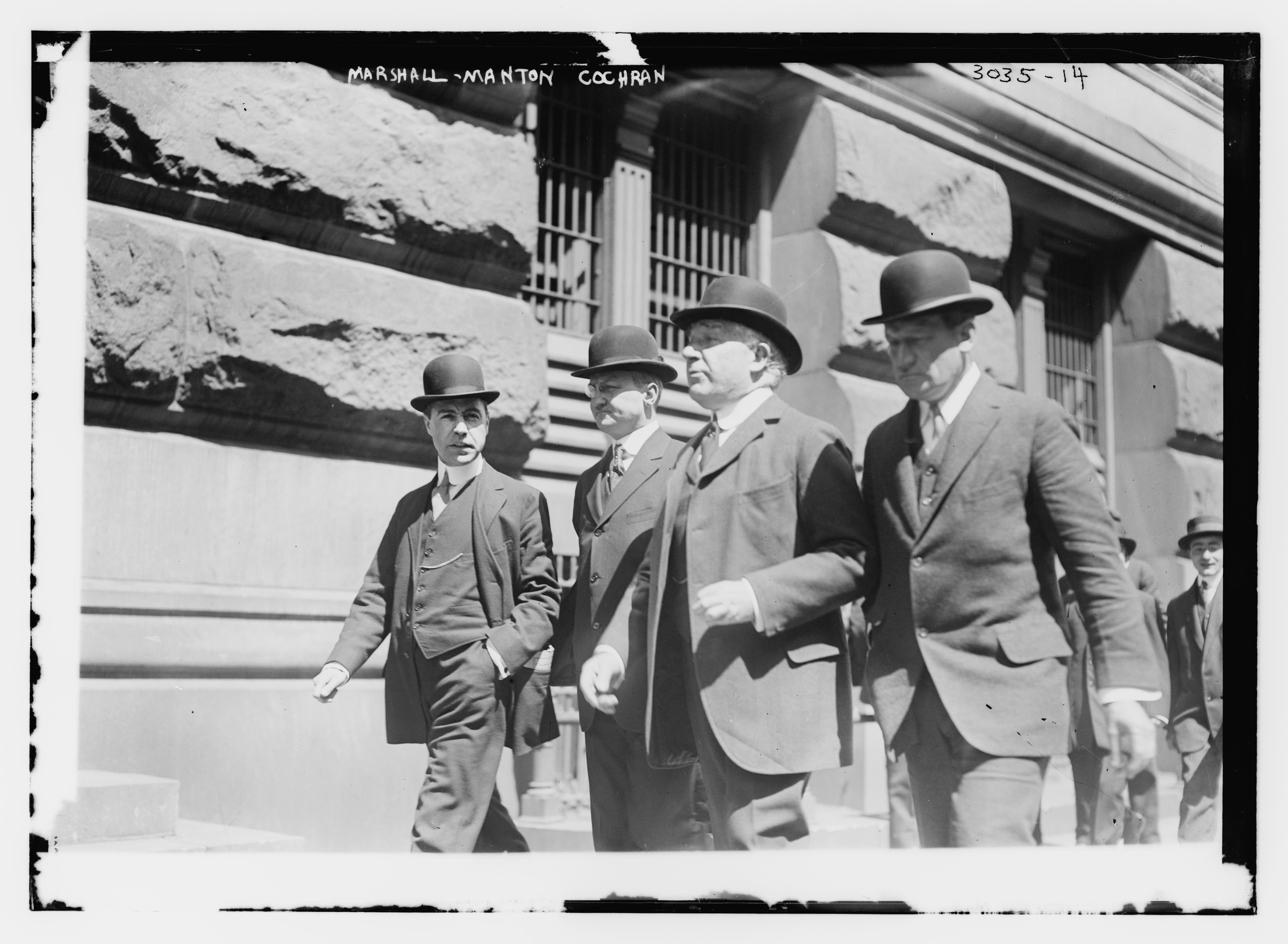
H. T. Marshall, Martin Thomas Manton, and William Bourke Cockran

Manton was nominated by President Woodrow Wilson on August 15, 1916, to a seat on the United States District Court for the Southern District of New York vacated by Judge Charles Merrill Hough. He was confirmed by the United States Senate on August 23, 1916, and received his commission the same day. His service terminated on March 22, 1918, due to his elevation to the Second Circuit.

Manton was nominated by President Wilson on March 12, 1918, to a seat on the United States Court of Appeals for the Second Circuit vacated by Judge Alfred Conkling Coxe Sr. He was confirmed by the Senate on March 18, 1918, and received commission the same day. He was a member of the Conference of Senior Circuit Judges (now the Judicial Conference of the United States) from 1926 to 1938. His service terminated on February 7, 1939, due to his resignation.

=== Supreme Court consideration ===
In 1922, President Warren G. Harding considered appointing Manton to the Supreme Court of the United States to succeed Justice William R. Day in what was then regarded as the "Catholic seat" on the Court. Manton encountered opposition led by Chief Justice William Howard Taft, and Harding ultimately appointed Justice Pierce Butler to the seat.

=== Notable cases ===
During the 1930s, Manton's seniority made him the Senior Circuit Judge of the Court (the rough equivalent of the Chief Judge position today). He wrote a memorable dissenting opinion in the obscenity litigation instigated by Bennett Cerf concerning the book Ulysses by James Joyce, United States v. One Book Entitled Ulysses, 72 F.2d 705 (2d Cir. 1934). Judges Learned Hand and Augustus Noble Hand decided that the book was not obscene, but Manton voted to ban it. Manton was also involved in a series of controversial decisions concerning control and financing of the companies then operating the New York City Subway.

=== Resignation and conspiracy conviction ===
Manton suffered severe financial reverses during the Great Depression and began to accept gifts and loans from persons having business before his court, some of which allegedly constituted outright bribes for selling his vote in pending patent litigation. Rumors of corruption spread and in 1939, Manton resigned under pressure of investigations by Manhattan District Attorney Thomas E. Dewey, who wrote a letter to the Chairman of the House Judiciary Committee recommending impeachment proceedings by a federal grand jury. Following his resignation, Manton was indicted in the United States District Court for the Southern District of New York where he once sat as a judge. The government was represented at trial by John T. Cahill, the United States Attorney for the Southern District of New York. Judge William Calvin Chesnut of the District of Maryland presided over the jury trial at which Manton called former Democratic Presidential candidates Alfred Smith and John W. Davis as character witnesses. Manton was convicted for conspiracy to obstruct justice.

Manton's conviction was affirmed by a specially constituted Second Circuit panel consisting of retired Supreme Court Justice George Sutherland, Supreme Court Justice Harlan Fiske Stone, and newly appointed Second Circuit Judge Charles Edward Clark. Manton was sentenced to two years in Lewisburg Federal Penitentiary and served 17 months.

== Death ==
Manton died on November 17, 1946, in Fayetteville, New York, where he had moved following his release from prison.

== Legacy ==
The 1940 Pulitzer Prize for reporting was awarded to S. Burton Heath for his coverage of the Manton trial for the New York World-Telegram.

== Sources ==
- "Manton, Martin Thomas - Federal Judicial Center". www.fjc.gov.

Legal offices
Preceded by Charles Merrill Hough	Judge of the United States District Court for the Southern District of New York; 1916–1918	Succeeded by John Knox
Preceded by Alfred Conkling Coxe Sr.	Judge of the United States Court of Appeals for the Second Circuit; 1918–1939	Succeeded by Robert P. Patterson
