= Are Women People? =

1915 book by Alice Duer Miller

Are Women People? A Book of Rhymes for Suffrage Times is the title of the collection of satirical poems published on June 12, 1915 by suffragist Alice Duer Miller. Many of the poems in this collection were originally released individually in the New York Tribune between February 4, 1913 to November 4, 1917.

This collection mainly contains satirical works and poetry designed to promote the suffrage movement. She satirized stereotypes about gender and how they were used to reinforce the status quo. Her collection was broke down into five sections: the Treacherous Texts, Campaign Material, Women's Sphere, A Masque of Teachers, and The Unconscious Suffragists. Each section varied in the style of writing employed by Miller from poetry, to prose, to lists, to a short play, but all of the writings promoted feminist and suffragist themes and ideals.

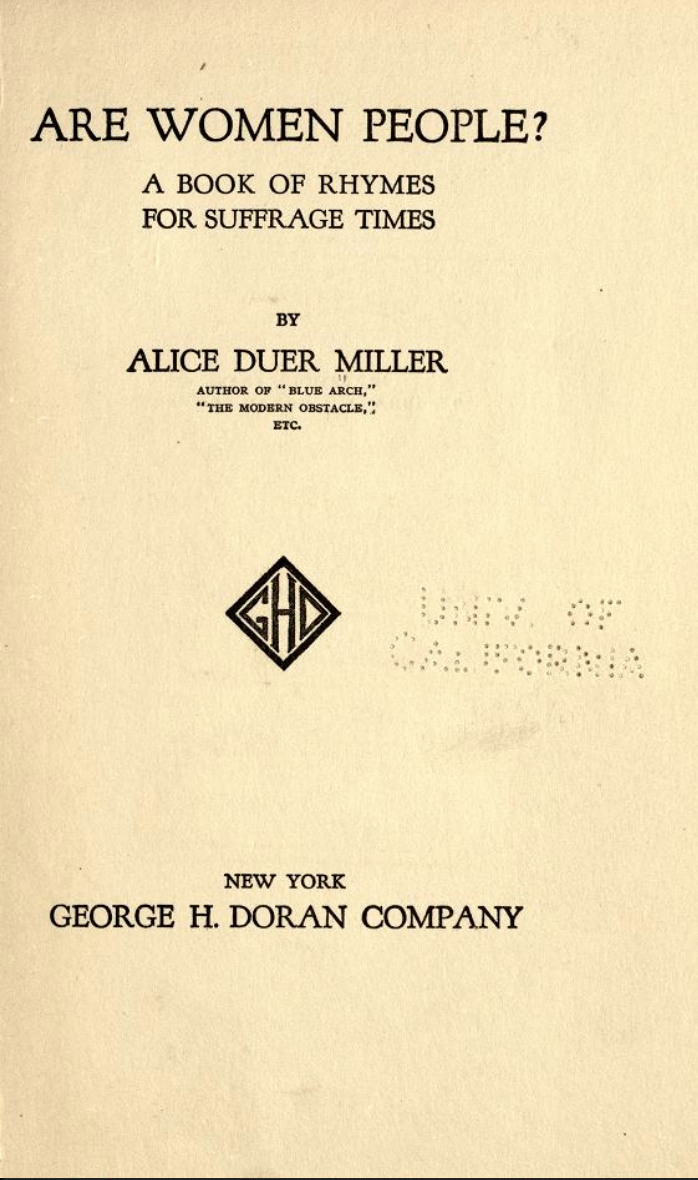
Title Page: Are Women People? A Book of Rhymes for Suffrage Times by Alice Duer Miller. Published by George H. Doran Company, New York, 1915

== Summary and Themes ==
=== The Treacherous Texts ===
The first section, the Treacherous Texts, contains satirical poetry that was written in direct response to a quote often from a public official that openly expressed anti-feminist and anti-suffragist ideals. Her poems in this section varied from satirical and comical to biting and harsh critiques of the quotes to which she was responding. She included these quotes above each poem for this section. One prime example of her use of this format was in her poem Representation, wherein which Miller writes in response to a quote by Vice President Thomas R. Marshall:

Representation

("My wife is against suffrage, and that settles me."—Vice-President Marshall.)

I

My wife dislikes the income tax,

And so I cannot pay it;

She thinks that golf all interest lacks,

So now I never play it;

She is opposed to tolls repeal

(Though why I cannot say),

But woman's duty is to feel,

And man's is to obey.

II

I'm in a hard position for a perfect gentleman,

I want to please the ladies, but I don't see how I can,

My present wife's a suffragist, and counts on my support,

But my mother is an anti, of a rather biting sort;

One grandmother is on the fence, the other much opposed,

And my sister lives in Oregon, and thinks the question's closed;

Each one is counting on my vote to represent her view.

Now what should you think proper for a gentleman to do?

=== Campaign Material (For Both Sides) ===
This section of the collection mainly contains lists and short timelines relating to suffrage themes. Many of these lists are sarcastic and critical examinations of the anti-suffrage and anti-feminist perspectives. One such list, Why We Oppose Pockets for Women, satirically examines the equal right of women to have pockets as a clear critique of those who pose similar arguments against women's suffrage:

Why We Oppose Pockets for Women

1. Because pockets are not a natural right.

2. Because the great majority of women do not want pockets. If they did they would have them.

3. Because whenever women have had pockets they have not used them.

4. Because women are required to carry enough things as it is, without the additional burden of pockets.

5. Because it would make dissension between husband and wife as to whose pockets were to be filled.

6. Because it would destroy man's chivalry toward woman, if he did not have to carry all her things in his pockets.

7. Because men are men, and women are women. We must not fly in the face of nature.

8. Because pockets have been used by men to carry tobacco, pipes, whiskey flasks, chewing gum and compromising letters. We see no reason to suppose that women would use them more wisely.

=== Women's Sphere ===
This section of the collection contains more of Miller's short poems. These satirical poems directly address issues of feminism, the double standards that women face and the need for equality for women. This collection of poems differs from that of The Treacherous Texts because unlike in the first section, most of the poems in this collection are not directly in response to and referencing a specific quote. One such work that exemplifies the kinds of satirical feminist writings typical of this section is A Sex Difference:

A Sex Difference

When men in Congress come to blows at something someone said,

I always notice that it shows their blood is quick and red;

But if two women disagree, with very little noise,

It proves, and this seems strange to me, that women have no poise.

=== A Masque of Teachers ===
This section contains only one work called The Ideal Candidates. This work is a short one-act play written in verse. The work is set up as a conversation between three candidates to become teachers and the board of education. Each candidate needs to prove to the board of directors that their husband is either unfit to work, or that they were left by their husband in order to be given a teaching position. This was written in response to a by-law of the New York Board of Education. At the beginning of the piece Miller directly addressed the motivation for this satirical work by including:

"A by-law of the New York Board of Education says: 'No married woman shall be appointed to any teaching or supervising position in the New York public schools unless her husband is mentally or physically incapacitated to earn a living or has deserted her for a period of not less than one year.'"

=== The Unconscious Suffragists ===
This final section contains quotes from many important male political leaders in the United States. All of the quotes collected in this section, whether or not it was the intention of the author, are arguing in favor of suffrage and equality for women.

== Release and Publication ==
These poems were originally released individually in the New York Tribune, and were later published as a collection by the George H. Doran company in 1915. In the introduction to this collection, Miller included the dedication:

"To the New York Tribune, in whose generous columns many of these verses first appeared, the author here wishes to express her gratitude."

Her column in the New York Tribune ran from February 1914 to November 1917.

== Reception ==
This collection was positive in its initial critical reception. It appeared in the New York Times' list of "IMPORTANT NEW BOOKS FOR JUNE; Publications in Various Fields of Literature to Fill Demands for Summer Reading," published on June 6, 1915. In the review:

Are Women People? verses and burlesques by Alice Duer Miller, and "How It Feels to be the Husband of a Suffragette- by Him," are two small suffrage books combining serious purpose with frivolous expression, both issued on June 12, just in time for the suffrage campaign now in several States[sic], including New York."

== Contents ==
=== Treacherous Texts ===
- ARE WOMEN PEOPLE?
- Our Idea of Nothing at All
- Lines to Mr. Bowdle of Ohio
- On Not Believing All You Hear
- The Revolt of Mother
- The Gallant Sex
- Representation
- Sonnet
- To President Wilson
- Home and Where It Is
- The Maiden's Vow
- Such Nonsense
- A Suggested Campaign Song
- The Woman of Charm
- A Modern Proposal
- The Newer Lullaby
- The Protected Sex
- Warning to Suffragists
- Partners
- What Governments Say to Women
- "Oh, That 'Twere Possible!"
- The Times Editorials

=== Campaign Material (For Both Sides) ===
- Our Own Twelve Anti-suffragist Reasons
- Why We Oppose Pockets for Women
- Fashion Notes: Past and Present
- Why We Oppose Women Travelling in Railway Trains
- Why We Oppose Schools for Children
- But Then Who Cares for Figures
- Why We Oppose Votes for Men
- The Logic of the Law
- Consistency
- Sometimes We're Ivy, and Sometimes We're Oak
- Do You Know
- Interviews With Celebrated Anti-Suffragists
- Another of Those Curious Coincidences
- The New Freedom
- To the Great Dining Out Majority

=== Women's Sphere ===
- Many Men to Any Woman
- A Sex Difference
- Advice to Heroines
- Mutual Vows
- If They Meant All They Said
- Democracy
- Feminism
- The Warning
- Evolution
- Intercepted
- The Universal Answer
- Candor
- What Every Woman Must Not Say
- Chivalry
- Women
- Beware!
- Male Philosophy
- From a Man's Point of View
- Glory
- Dependence
- Playthings
- Militants
- A Lady's Choice
- The Ballad of Lost Causes
- Thoughts at an Anti Meeting

=== A Masque of Teachers ===
- The Ideal Candidates
