= Collegiate (1936 film) =

1936 film by Ralph Murphy

- Theatrical release poster
- Directed by: Ralph Murphy
- Screenplay by: Walter DeLeon; Francis Martin
- Based on: novel by Alice Duer Miller
- Produced by: Louis D. Lighton
- Starring: Joe Penner; Jack Oakie; Ned Sparks; Frances Langford; Betty Grable; Lynne Overman
- Cinematography: William C. Mellor
- Production company: Paramount Pictures
- Distributed by: Paramount Pictures
- Release date: January 22, 1936
- Running time: 80 minutes
- Country: United States
- Language: English

Collegiate is a 1936 American musical film directed by Ralph Murphy and written by Walter DeLeon, Francis Martin and Alice Duer Miller. The film stars Joe Penner, Jack Oakie, Ned Sparks, Frances Langford, Betty Grable and Lynne Overman. The film was released on January 22, 1936, by Paramount Pictures.

The film is a remake of the 1921 silent film The Charm School.

== Plot ==
The irresponsible Jerry Craig inherits a school from an aunt. He goes there with pal Sourpuss and press agent Scoop, transforms the place into a charm school encounters a stranger named Joe who becomes a financial benefactor.

The school's a huge success. Jerry's loyalties are torn between his fiancée Eunice and secretary Juliet, then complications develop when Joe doesn't turn out to be who he seems to be.

== Cast ==
- Joe Penner as Joe
- Jack Oakie as Jerry Craig
- Ned Sparks as 'Scoop' Oakland
- Frances Langford as Miss Hay
- Betty Grable as Dorothy
- Lynne Overman as Sour-Puss
- Betty Jane Cooper as Dance Instructress
- Mack Gordon as Mack Gordon
- Harry Revel as Harry Revel
- Julius Tannen as Detective Browning
- Nora Cecil as Miss Curtiss
- Henry Kolker as Mr. MacGregor
