= George Chandler Holt =

American judge

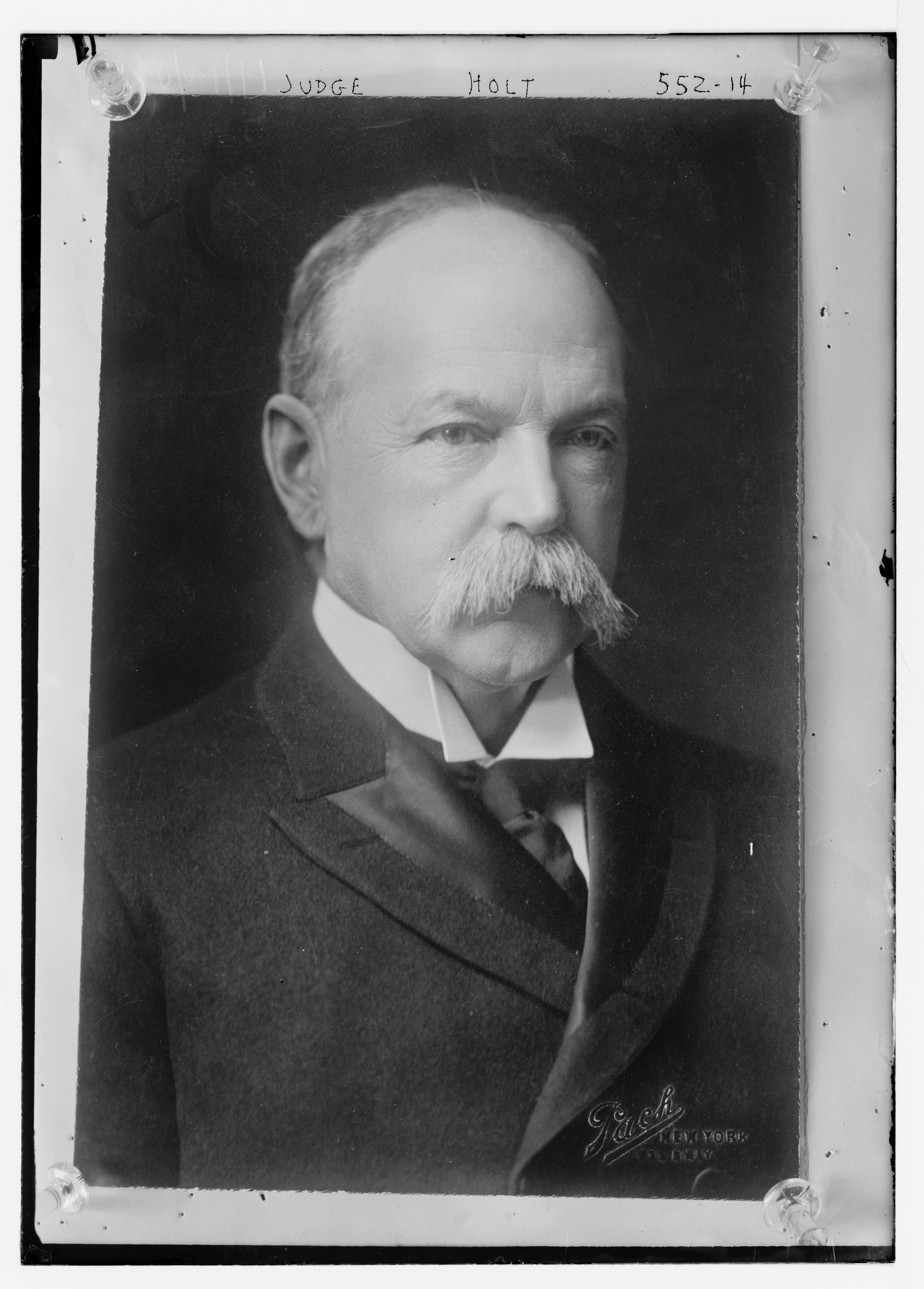

Judge of the United States District Court for the Southern District of New York
- In office March 3, 1903 – January 16, 1914
- Appointed by: Theodore Roosevelt
- Preceded by: Seat established by 32 Stat. 805
- Succeeded by: Augustus Noble Hand

Personal details
- Born: George Chandler Holt; December 31, 1843 Mexico, New York
- Died: January 26, 1931 (aged 87) Nice, France
- Education: Yale University (A.B.); Columbia Law School (LL.B.)

George Chandler Holt (December 31, 1843 – January 26, 1931) was a United States district judge of the United States District Court for the Southern District of New York.

== Education and career ==
Born in Mexico, New York, Holt received an Artium Baccalaureus degree from Yale University in 1866, where he was a member of Skull and Bones, and a Bachelor of Laws from Columbia Law School in 1869. He was in private practice in New York City, New York from 1869 to 1898. In 1871, he married Mary Louisa Bowen, daughter of businessman Henry Chandler Bowen; the couple had five children, including Hamilton, a magazine editor and college president. Holt was a Referee in Bankruptcy for the United States District Court for the Southern District of New York from 1898 to 1903.

== Federal judicial service ==
On March 2, 1903, Holt was nominated by President Theodore Roosevelt to a new seat on the United States District Court for the Southern District of New York created by 32 Stat. 805. He was confirmed by the United States Senate on March 3, 1903, and received his commission the same day. Holt served in that capacity until his retirement on January 16, 1914.

== Death ==
Holt died of influenza in Nice, France on January 26, 1931.

== Sources ==
Legal offices
| Preceded by Seat established by 32 Stat. 805 | Judge of the United States District Court for the Southern District of New York; 1903–1914 | Succeeded by Augustus Noble Hand |
