= Hamilton Holt =

American magazine editor and educator (1872–1951)

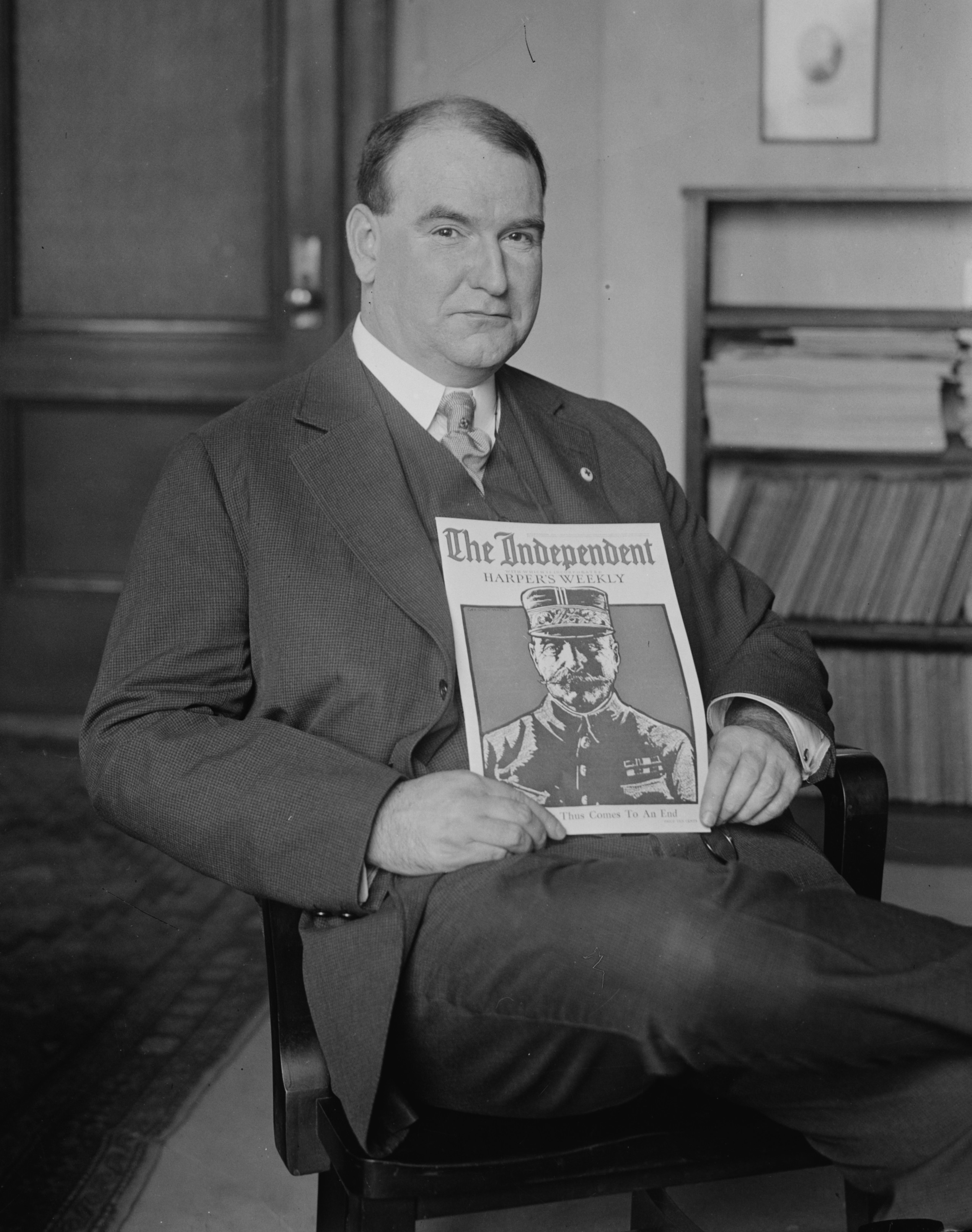
- Hamilton Holt with a copy of The Independent

President of Rollins College
- In office 1925–1949

Personal details
- Born: August 18, 1872 Brooklyn, New York, U.S.
- Died: April 26, 1951 (aged 78) Putnam, Connecticut, U.S.
- Education: Yale University (1894); Columbia University (1897)

Hamilton Holt (August 18, 1872 – April 26, 1951) was an American educator, editor, author and politician. He was president of Rollins College 1925 to 1949.

== Biography ==
Holt was born on August 18, 1872, in Brooklyn, New York City, to George Chandler Holt and his wife Mary Louisa Bowen Holt. His father was an attorney who was eventually appointed to the federal judiciary. He was raised in the Spuyten Duyvil neighborhood in the Bronx.

Hamilton Holt graduated from Yale University in 1894 and completed graduate work in economics and sociology at Columbia University in Manhattan, New York City, three years later.

Holt served as editor and publisher of the liberal weekly magazine The Independent in New York from 1897 to 1921.

He was an outspoken advocate for reform, prohibition, immigrant rights, and international peace. In 1906 he published a collection of immigrants' life stories as The Life Stories of Undistinguished Americans as Told by Themselves.

In 1909 Holt was a founding member of the National Association for the Advancement of Colored People (NAACP).

He served on the executive committee of the League to Enforce Peace and was the first Executive Director of the endowment fund of the Woodrow Wilson Foundation, established to support individuals and groups working to advance the cause of international peace.

In 1924 Holt unsuccessfully ran for the U.S. Senate from Connecticut as a Democrat. He was soundly defeated by Hiram Bingham III, 60.4% to 38.6%.

=== President of Rollins College ===
In 1925, Holt became President of Rollins College in Florida and served in that capacity until 1949. His approach to education stresses a cooperative new system called the "Conference Plan" which involved extensive one-on-one interaction between professor and student. It required the college to limit enrollment and recruit professors who would be effective in their new educational mentoring roles. He also advocated a policy whereby the student body could approve or disapprove of faculty hirings, and inaugurated the Walk of Fame.

Because of Holt's commitment to teaching and learning innovation, he organized a national five-day Rollins Educational Conference in 1931, led by John Dewey, that brought together leaders in non-traditional higher education. Many ideas from the meetings were integrated into the college's Conference Plan and helped establish the college's national reputation as a leading innovative teaching institution.

Holt believed in the value of outstanding role models and brought to campus leaders in their fields including politicians such as presidents Calvin Coolidge, Franklin Roosevelt, and Harry Truman; inventor Thomas Edison; business leader J. C. Penney; poet Carl Sandburg; writer Marjorie Kinnan Rawlings; military leader General Omar Bradley; pioneering social worker Jane Addams of Hull House; jurist William O. Douglas, and actors such as James Cagney and Mary Pickford.

In 1933, the American Association of University Professors investigated several dismissals and forced resignations at Rollins College. It criticized Holt's autocratic style and the lack of security of tenure at the institution. Rollins College was subsequently censured by the AAUP.

Holt died on April 26, 1951, at the Day-Kimball Hospital in Putnam, Connecticut.

== Legacy ==
The Rollins College evening program is named in his honor as is a street in the city of Winter Park.

Party political offices
Preceded by Augustine Lonergan	Democratic nominee for U.S. Senator from Connecticut (Class 3); 1924	Succeeded by Rollin U. Tyler
