= Joseph Larocque (attorney) =

American lawyer (1831–1908)

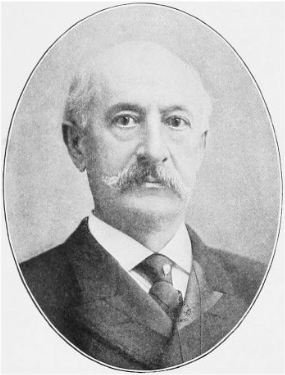
- Born: April 2, 1831; New York City, US
- Died: June 9, 1908 (aged 77); New York City, US
- Education: Columbia University
- Occupation: Lawyer
- Title: President of the New York City Bar Association
- Term: 1895–1896
- Predecessor: Wheeler Hazard Peckham
- Successor: James C. Carter
- Relatives: Diana Rivers (granddaughter); Annie Rensselaer Tinker (granddaughter); Edward Larocque Tinker (grandson)

Joseph Larocque (April 2, 1831 – June 9, 1908) was a New York City lawyer and president of the New York City Bar Association.

== Biography ==
He was born in New York City in 1831 and educated at Columbia University. Several years after his admission to New York City Bar Association, he partnered with Judge William G. Choate to form the law firm of Shipman, Larocque & Choate, where he practiced until his retirement in 1899. Larocque was a director of a number of companies, including the American Cotton Oil Company, the Commonwealth Insurance Company of New York, Niagara Falls Power Company, and Plaza Bank. He also served on the boards of a number of New York City institutions, including the Metropolitan Museum of Art, the Century Club, and Columbia University. Larocque was active in reform politics, serving as president of the New York City Bar Association from 1894 to 1895 and as chairman of the pro-Temperance Committee of Fifty in 1894.

He died on June 9, 1908, of pneumonia at age 78 in New York City. He was the grandfather of author and philanthropist Edward Larocque Tinker (1881-1968) as well as Annie Rensselaer Tinker, also a philanthropist and a suffragist. Diana Rivers is his granddaughter through his daughter, Elizabeth Larocque.
