= Annie Rensselaer Tinker =

American suffragist

- Born: October 24, 1884; New York City, New York
- Died: February 21, 1924 (aged 39); Southampton, England
- Resting place: Green-Wood Cemetery, New York City
- Occupations: Suffragist, philanthropist
- Known for: Annie Tinker Association for Women
- Movement: Women's Suffrage in the United States
- Relatives: Joseph Larocque (grandfather); Edward Larocque Tinker (brother)

Annie Rensselaer Tinker was an American suffragist, volunteer nurse, and philanthropist. The daughter of wealthy parents, she sailed to Europe to volunteer as a nurse in World War I, three years before the United States joined the war. Upon her death at the age of 39, Tinker left her sizeable estate to form the Annie R. Tinker Memorial Fund nonprofit organization, whose mission is to provide financial assistance to elderly retired women. The organization was later renamed the Annie Tinker Association for Women and remained active until 2018.

== Early life and education ==
Tinker was born in New York City, New York to the wealthy family of Henry Chapman Tinker, a successful banker and president of Liberty National Bank, and Louise Larocque Tinker. Annie's brother was Edward Larocque Tinker, a writer and philanthropist. Tinker is the granddaughter of Joseph Larocque, a New York City lawyer. Growing up, her family spent summers in Setauket, New York, where Tinker learned to sail. Tinker spent a year at Brearley School, a private all-girls school, from 1896 to 1897.

== Women's suffrage ==
Tinker's family wealth allowed her to focus on social issues, including women's suffrage. As a young adult, Tinker joined the Woman's Political Union, an organization dedicated to promoting women's rights. Tinker was a practiced equestrian, and organized multiple parades and marches of women on horseback in support of a woman's right to vote:

- In 1911, Tinker led a "women's cavalry" of suffragists in horseback to march in parades
- In 1912, Tinker led a parade of 30,000 suffragists down Fifth Avenue
- In May 1913, Tinker and her cavalry marched in the New York City suffrage parade

Tinker was also known to comment on a woman's involvement in wartime, making statements about the need for women to fight alongside men, "scandaliz[ing] elite society" with these comments.

== World War I ==
At the start of World War I in 1914, three years before the United States joined the war, Tinker sailed herself to Europe to volunteer with the British Red Cross. She served as a nurse, working on the front lines in Belgium, France, and Italy. She was placed in charge of a hospital in Ostend, Belgium. The hospital was overtaken by Germans soldiers during her time as director. After her father died unexpectedly in 1915, she sailed home for his funeral, and then returned to Europe to serve for the remainder of the war.

For her services during the war, the French government awarded her a medal of honor in 1921.

== Personal life ==
After the end of World War I, Tinker lived in Naples, Italy. She entered into a long-term relationship with Kate Darling Nelson, eventually naming her as sole heir of her will. Tinker's dress was considered "masculine" for the time, even earning a comment from The New York Times on her “mannish garb.” A portrait of her at the age of fifteen shows her in a man's smoking jacket, "flaunt[ing] convention".

Tinker described herself as a "spinster".

== Death and legacy ==
Tinker's health began to falter in her late thirties. She died after undergoing surgery for tonsillitis, passing on February 21, 1924, at the age of 39.

In her will, she bequeathed a sum of two million dollars to form the "Annie R. Tinker Memorial Fund", with the stated purpose of providing help to "women who have to work for a living". The fund remained active until 2018, when it legally transferred its assets to The New York Community Trust. A new fund was created in Tinker's name to continue her charitable mission.
