= Ochs v. Commissioner =

American legal case

- Court: United States Court of Appeals for the Second Circuit
- Argued: Feb. 15, 1952
- Decided: March 27, 1952
- Citations: 195 F.2d 692; 37 A.L.R.2d 545; 52-1 USTC (CCH) ¶ 9271

Case history
- Prior history: 17 T.C. 130 (1951)

Court membership
- Judges sitting: Augustus Noble Hand, Harrie B. Chase, Jerome Frank

Case opinions
- Majority: Hand, joined by Chase
- Dissent: Frank

Laws applied
- Internal Revenue Code

Ochs v. Commissioner, 195 F.2d 692 (2nd Cir.1952) was an income tax case decided by Judge Augustus Noble Hand.

== Background ==
=== Facts ===
On December 10, 1943, a thyroidectomy was performed on petitioner's wife. A histological examination disclosed a papillary carcinoma of the thyroid with multiple lymph node metastases, according to the surgeon's report. During the taxable year, the petitioner maintained his two children in day school during the first half of the year, and in boarding school during the latter half of the year at a cost of $1,456.50. Petitioner deducted this sum from his income for the year 1946 as a medical expense under section 23(x) of the Internal Revenue Code.

During the taxable year, as a result of the operation on December 10, 1943, petitioner's wife was unable to speak above a whisper. Efforts of petitioner's wife to speak were painful, required much of her strength, and left her in a highly nervous state. Petitioner was advised by the operating surgeon that his wife suffered from cancer of the throat, a condition which was fatal in many cases. He advised extensive X-ray treatment after the operation. Petitioner became alarmed when, by 1946, his wife's voice had failed to improve, and believed that the irritation and nervousness caused by attempting to care for the children at a time when she could scarcely speak above a whisper might cause a recurrence of the cancer. Petitioner and his wife consulted a reputable physician and were advised by him that if the children were not separated from petitioner's wife she would not improve and her nervousness and irritation might cause a recurrence of the cancer. Petitioner continued to maintain his children in boarding school after the taxable year here involved until up to the end of five years following the operation of December 10, 1943, petitioner having been advised that if there was no recurrence of the cancer during that time his wife could be considered as having recovered from the cancer.

During the taxable year petitioner's income was between $5,000 and $6,000. Petitioner's two children have not attended private school but have lived at home and attended public school since a period beginning five years after the operation of December 10, 1943. Petitioner's purpose in sending the children to boarding school during the year 1946 was to alleviate his wife's pain and suffering in caring for the children by reason of her inability to speak above a whisper and to prevent a recurrence of the cancer which was responsible for the condition of her voice. He also thought it would be good for the children to be away from their mother as much as possible while she was unable to speak to them above a whisper.

Petitioner's wife was employed part of her time in 1946 as a typist and stenographer. On account of the impairment which existed in her voice she found it difficult to hold a position and was only able to do part-time work. At the time of the hearing of this proceeding in 1951, she had recovered the use of her voice and seems to have entirely recovered from her throat cancer.

=== Issue ===
The question raised by this appeal is whether the taxpayer Samuel Ochs was entitled under Section 213(x) of the Internal Revenue Code to deduct the sum of $1,456.50 paid by him for maintaining his two minor children in day school and boarding school as medical expenses incurred for the benefit of his wife.

=== Tax court ===
The Tax Court said in its opinion that it had no reason to doubt the good faith and truthfulness of the taxpayer and that his devotion and consideration for his wife were altogether admirable, but it nevertheless held that the expense of sending the children to school was not deductible as a medical expense under the provisions of Section 23(x) and the Treasury Regulations herein referred to.

Petitioner taxpayer sought review of the decision of the lower court, which held that expenses paid by petitioner for maintaining his two minor children in day school and boarding school were non-deductible family expenses within the meaning of 26 U.S.C.S. § 24(a)(1).

Following the lower court's decision that expenses incurred by petitioner taxpayer in sending his children to day and boarding school were non-deductible family expenses pursuant to 26 U.S.C.S. § 24(a)(1), petitioner sought review. Petitioner argued that the purpose in sending the children to boarding school was to alleviate his wife's pain and suffering in caring for the children by reason of her inability to speak above a whisper and to prevent a recurrence of cancer. Petitioner argued that these expenses were therefore medical expenses, entitling him to a deduction.

== Opinion of the court ==
The court rejected petitioner's argument and affirmed the decision. The court held that while it had no reason to doubt the good faith and truthfulness of petitioner and his reasons for incurring the expenses, the expenses incurred in sending the children to boarding school were nevertheless not deductible as medical expenses pursuant to the provisions of 26 U.S.C.S. § 23(x). The court held that the expenses were made necessary by the loss of the wife's services and that family expenditures could not be converted into deductible medical expenses.

The court affirmed the decision that held that expenses paid by petitioner taxpayer in connection with sending his children to boarding school were family expenditures and not deductible as medical expenses. The court held that these expenses were non-deductible family expenses because they were incurred as a result of the loss of the wife's services.
