= The Charm School (film) =

1921 film directed by James Cruze

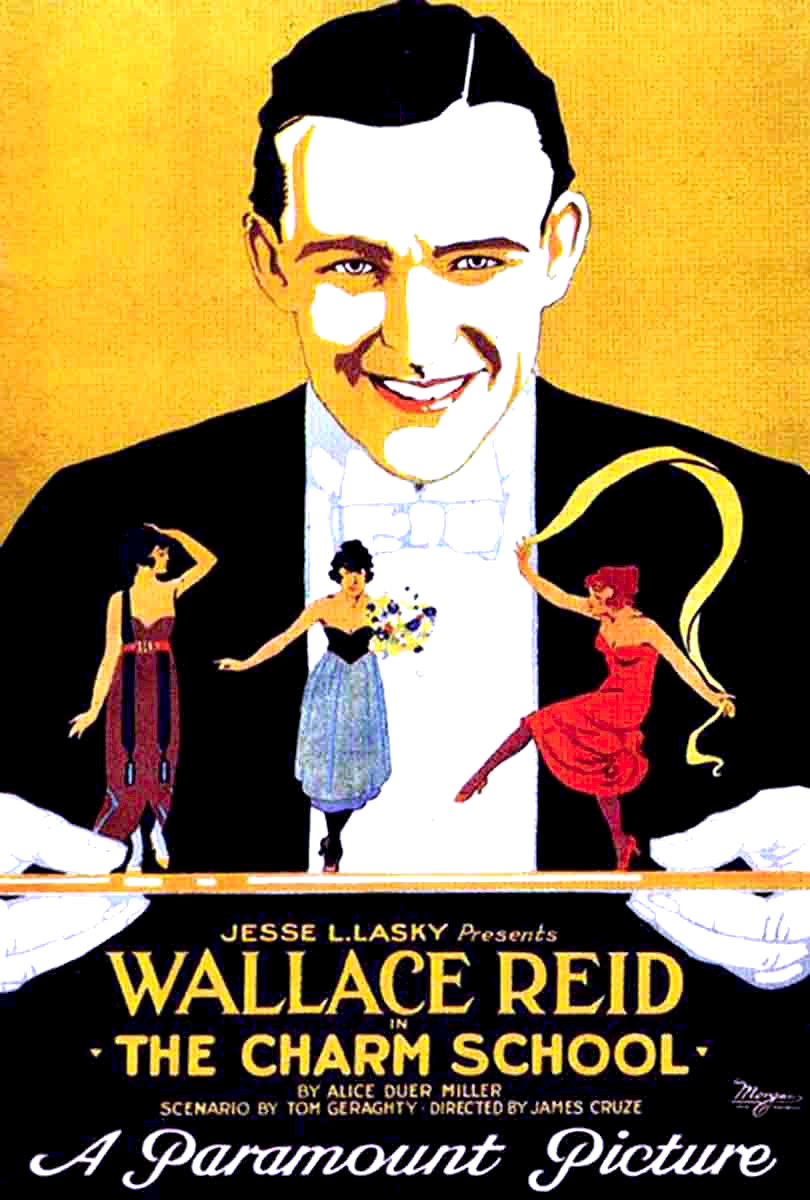
- 1921 lobby poster
- Directed by: James Cruze
- Written by: Thomas J. Geraghty (scenario)
- Based on: The Charm School by Alice Duer Miller
- Produced by: Adolph Zukor; Jesse Lasky
- Starring: Wallace Reid; Lila Lee
- Cinematography: C. Edgar Schoenbaum
- Distributed by: Paramount Pictures
- Release date: January 1921
- Running time: 5 reels; (4,743 feet)
- Country: United States
- Language: Silent (English intertitles)

The Charm School is a lost 1921 American silent comedy film starring Wallace Reid. Produced by Famous Players–Lasky and distributed through Paramount Pictures this James Cruze directed film was based on a 1920 Broadway stage play and novel by Alice Duer Miller that starred veteran actress Minnie Dupree. It is currently a lost film. It was filmed on the campus of Pomona College in Claremont, California.

== Plot ==
As summarized in a film publication, when Mrs. Rolles insists that she will not have Austin Bevans as a son-in-law, he insists that she will. But when his aunt dies and leaves Austin a girl's boarding school in her will, Austin gives up his suit of Susie Rolles and decides to run the school. Under his aunt's regime the girls studied microbes, etc., but Austin turns it into a charm school where the girls are taught dancing, fencing, and grace in general. Elsie, one of the students, immediately falls in love with Austin, but he fails to respond. She then tries to vamp him, but when Austin does not fall she tells him directly that she loves him. Elsie's uncle is very interested in the young Austin. When Mrs. Rolles hears of how well he is getting along, she tries to patch things up between Austin and her daughter Susie, and tells Elsie that the two are engaged. While Elsie is brokenhearted, in the end all turns out well for her and Austin.

== Cast ==
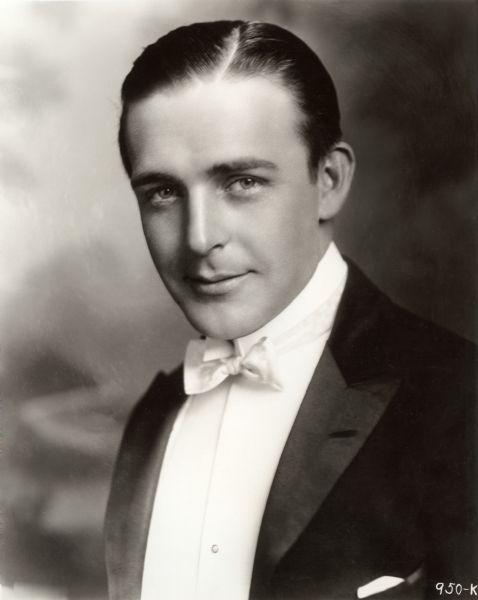
Wallace Reid

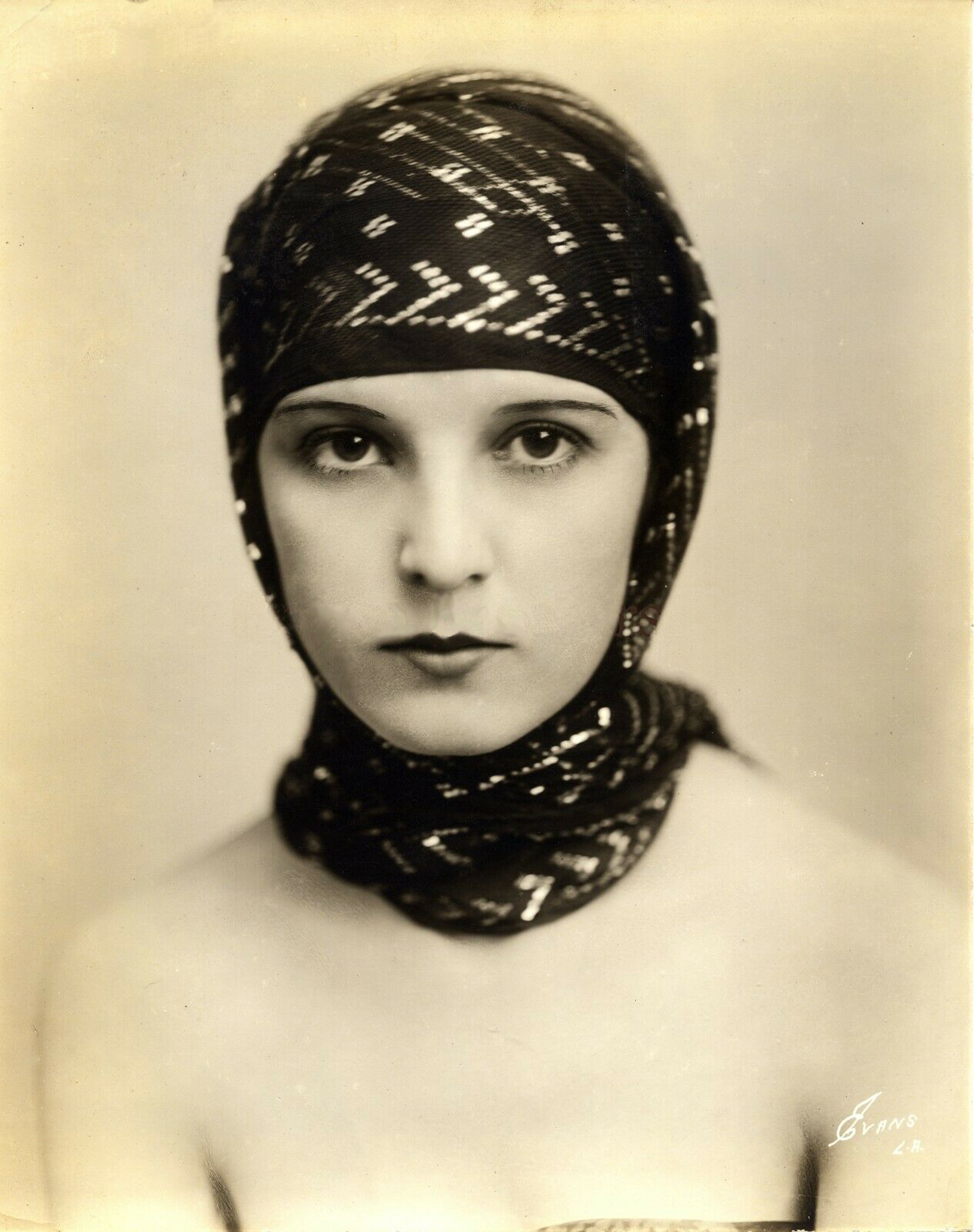
Beulah Bains

- Wallace Reid - Austin Bevans
- Lila Lee - Elsie
- Adele Farrington - Mrs. Rolles
- Beulah Bains - Susie Rolles
- Edwin Stevens - Homer Johns
- Grace Morse - Miss Hayes
- Patricia Magee - Sally Boyd
- Lincoln Stedman - George Boyd
- Kate Toncray - Miss Curtis
- Minna Redman - Miss Tevis
- Snitz Edwards - Mr. Boyd
- Helen Pillsbury - Mrs. Boyd
- Tina Marshall - Europia

== Remake ==
The story was remade in 1936 as the film Collegiate.
