= Edward Larocque Tinker =

Edward Larocque Tinker (September 12, 1881, in New York City – July 6, 1968, in New York City) was an American writer and philanthropist who developed a deep interest in the culture of Latin America and spent much of his life exploring it. Tinker was the grandson of Joseph Larocque. He studied at Columbia University Law School. He achieved Ph.D.'s in literature from the University of Paris and the University of Madrid. He also wrote extensively on the culture and history of the city of New Orleans.

His mother was Louise (Larocque) Tinker, his father was Henry Champlin Tinker, and he married Frances McKee on January 16, 1916. His sister was Annie Rensselaer Tinker, a suffragist and philanthropist.

In April 1932, Edward Larocque Tinker was elected to the American Antiquarian Society, where he contributed scholarly papers on Louisiana Creole language, French-language newspapers, and Latin American literature.

Tinker created the Tinker Foundation in 1959 in memory of his second wife Frances McKee Tinker, his father Henry Champlin Tinker, and his grandfather Edward Greenfield Tinker.

The Edward Larocque Tinker Library is located at the Harry Ransom Center, the University of Texas at Austin.

== Works ==
- Lafcadio Hearn's American Days, 1924
- Closed Shutters: Old New Orleans - the Eighties, 1931
- Les écrits de langue française en Louisiane au XIXe siècle, 1932
- The horsemen of the Americas and the literature they inspired, 1953
- Gombo Comes to Philadelphia1957
- Life and Literature of the Pampas, 1961
- Centaurs of Many Lands, 1964
