= Caroline King Duer =

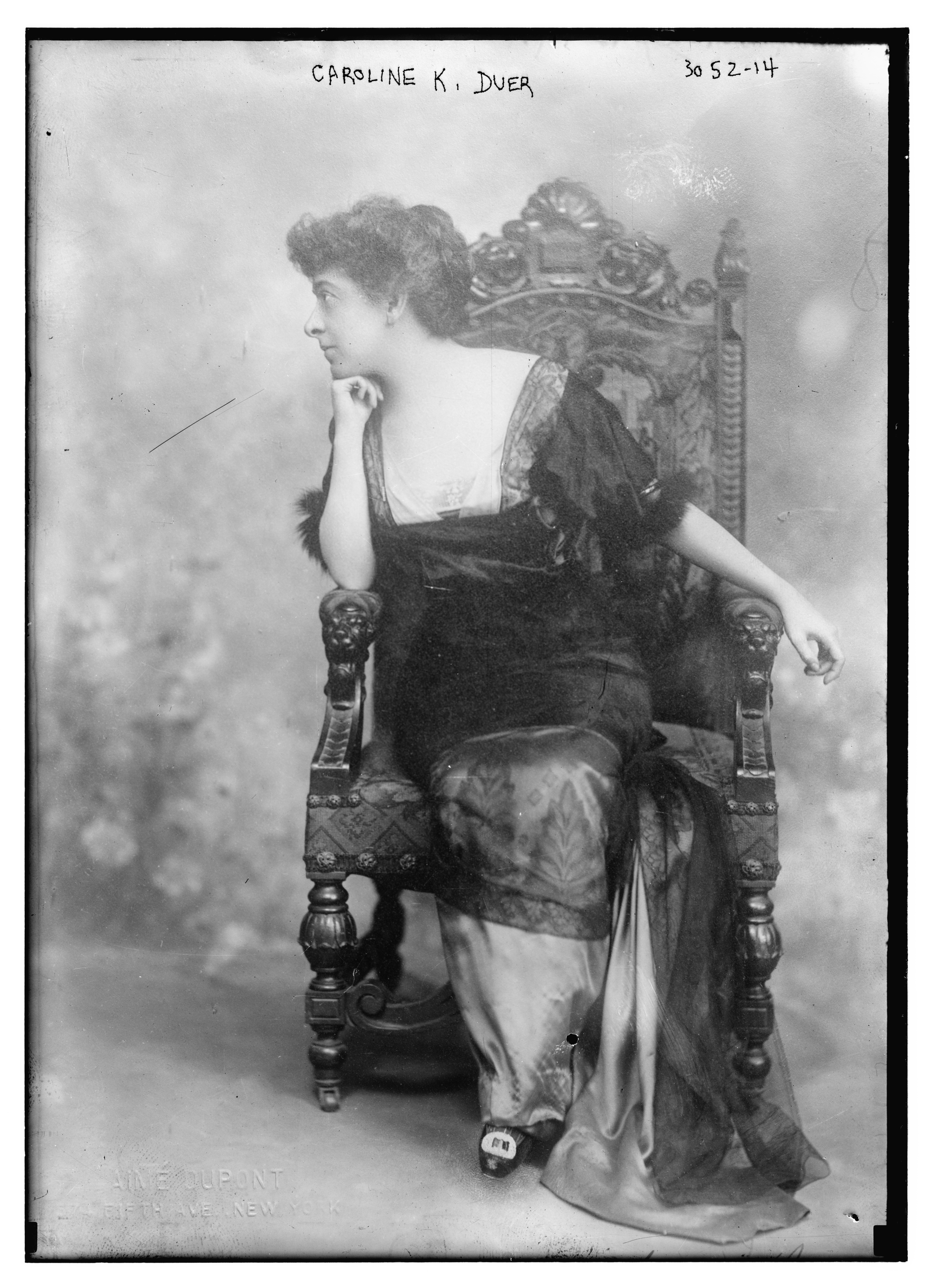

Caroline King Duer (1865 – January 23, 1956) was an editor at Vogue magazine and writer. Her sister was author Alice Duer Miller.
