= Alice Duer Miller =

American writer (1874–1942)

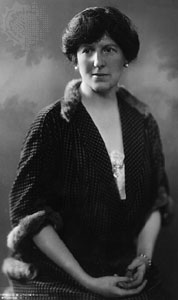
- Miller, c. 1920
- Born: July 28, 1874; Staten Island, New York, U.S.
- Died: August 22, 1942 (aged 68)
- Burial place: Evergreen Cemetery
- Education: Barnard College
- Occupation: Writer
- Spouse: Henry Wise Miller (m. 1899)
- Family: Caroline King Duer (sister); William Alexander Duer (great-grandfather); William Duer (great-great grandfather); William Alexander, Lord Stirling (great-great-great grandfather); Rufus King (ancestor)

Alice Maud Duer Miller (July 28, 1874 – August 22, 1942) was an American writer whose poetry actively influenced political opinion. Her feminist verses influenced political opinion during the American suffrage movement, and her verse novel The White Cliffs influenced political thought during the U.S.'s entry into World War II. She also wrote novels and screenplays.

== Early life ==
Alice Maud Duer was born in Staten Island, New York, on July 28, 1874, into a wealthy and prominent family. She grew up in Weehawken, New Jersey with her parents and two sisters. She was the daughter of James Gore King Duer and Elizabeth Wilson Meads. The family lost their fortune during the Baring Bank failure.

Her mother Elizabeth Wilson Meads was the daughter of Orlando Meads of Albany, New York. Her great-grandfather was William Alexander Duer, president of Columbia College. Her great-great-grandfather was William Duer, an American lawyer, developer, and speculator from New York City. He had served in the Continental Congress and the convention that framed the New York Constitution. In 1778, he signed the United States Articles of Confederation. Her great-great-great-grandfather was William Alexander, who claimed the disputed title of Earl of Stirling and was an American major-general during the American Revolutionary War.

Miller was also a descendant of Senator Rufus King, who was an American lawyer, politician, and diplomat. He was a delegate for Massachusetts to the Continental Congress. He also attended the Constitutional Convention and was one of the signatories of the United States Constitution on September 17, 1787. Alice attended Barnard College in 1895, studying Mathematics and Astronomy and graduating Phi Beta Kappa. She helped to pay for her studies by selling novels and short essays to Harper's and Scribner's magazines. Alice excelled as a student with her award-winning thesis "Dedekind's Theory of the Irrational Number". She and her sister Caroline jointly published a book of poems. Miller remained connected to Barnard throughout her life; she was elected as a trustee of Barnard College in 1922.

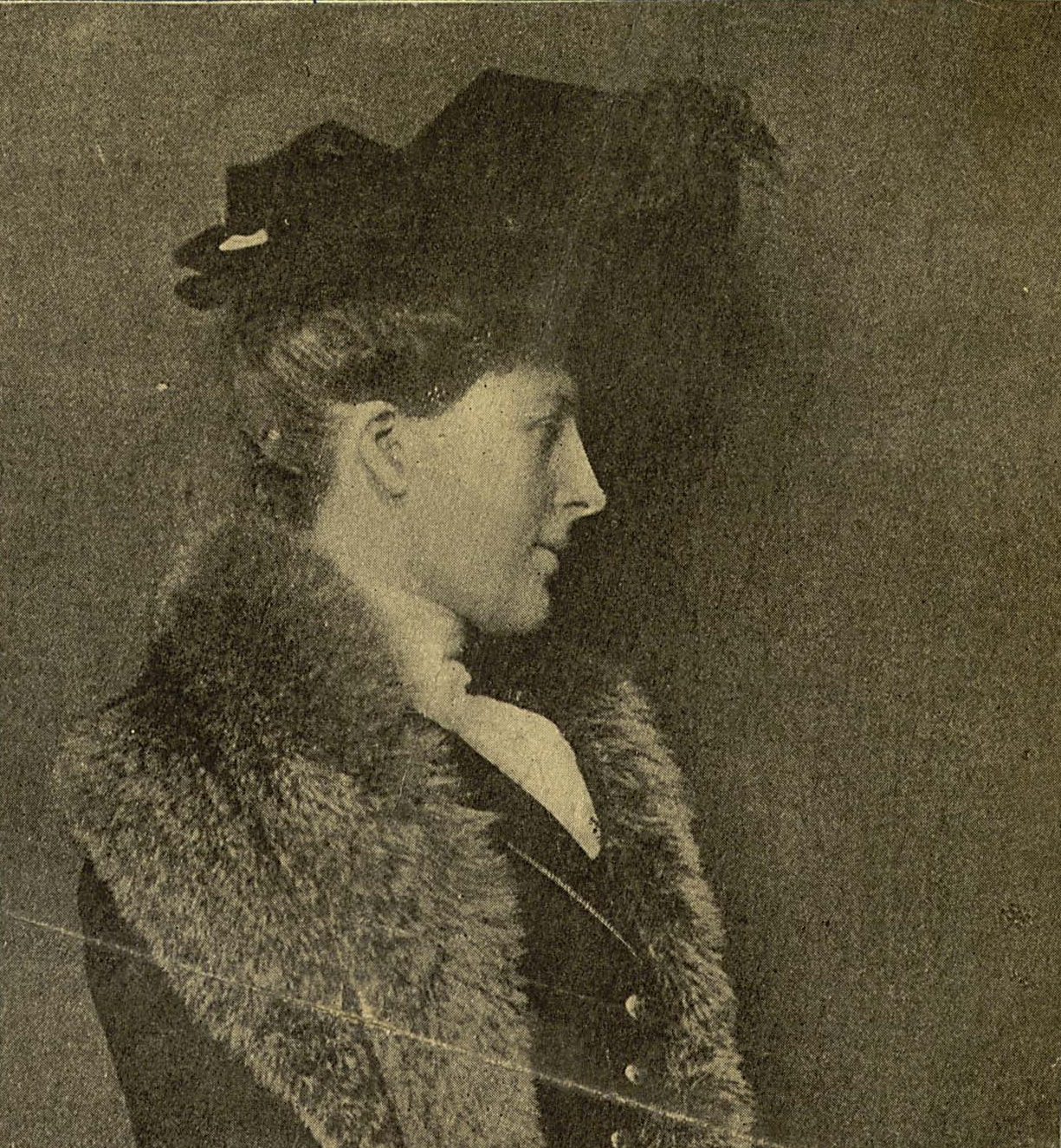
Alice Duer Miller in 1908 or 1909

== Career ==
Alice wrote her entire life, but before she was a full-time writer, she taught at a girls school English composition and tutored Barnard College students in mathematics. Miller became known as a campaigner for women's suffrage and was an active member of the Algonquin Round Table and Heterodoxy. She published a series of satirical poems in the New York Tribune titled and later republished in the collection, Are Women People? These words became a catchphrase of the suffrage movement. Part of one poem reads:

"FATHER, what is a Legislature?
A representative body elected by the people of the state.
Are women people?
No, my son, criminals, lunatics and women are not people.
Do legislators legislate for nothing?
Oh, no; they are paid a salary.
By whom?
By the people.
Are women people?
Of course, my son, just as much as men are." She followed this collection with Women Are People! (1917).

As a novelist, she scored her first success with Come Out of the Kitchen in 1916. The story was made into a play and later the 1948 film Spring in Park Lane. She followed it with a series of other short novels, many of which were staged and (increasingly) made into films.

Her novel in verse Forsaking All Others (1933) was about a tragic love affair; many consider it her greatest work. Miller was invited to write for Hollywood in 1921 by Samuel Goldwyn. Many of her stories became motion pictures, such as Are Parents People? (1925), Roberta (1935), and Irene (1940). She also became involved in a number of motion picture screenplays, including Wife vs. Secretary (1936). Her name appears in the very first issue of The New Yorker as an advisory editor. Throughout her life, she wrote successfully for a wide range of genres and produced forty-four books.

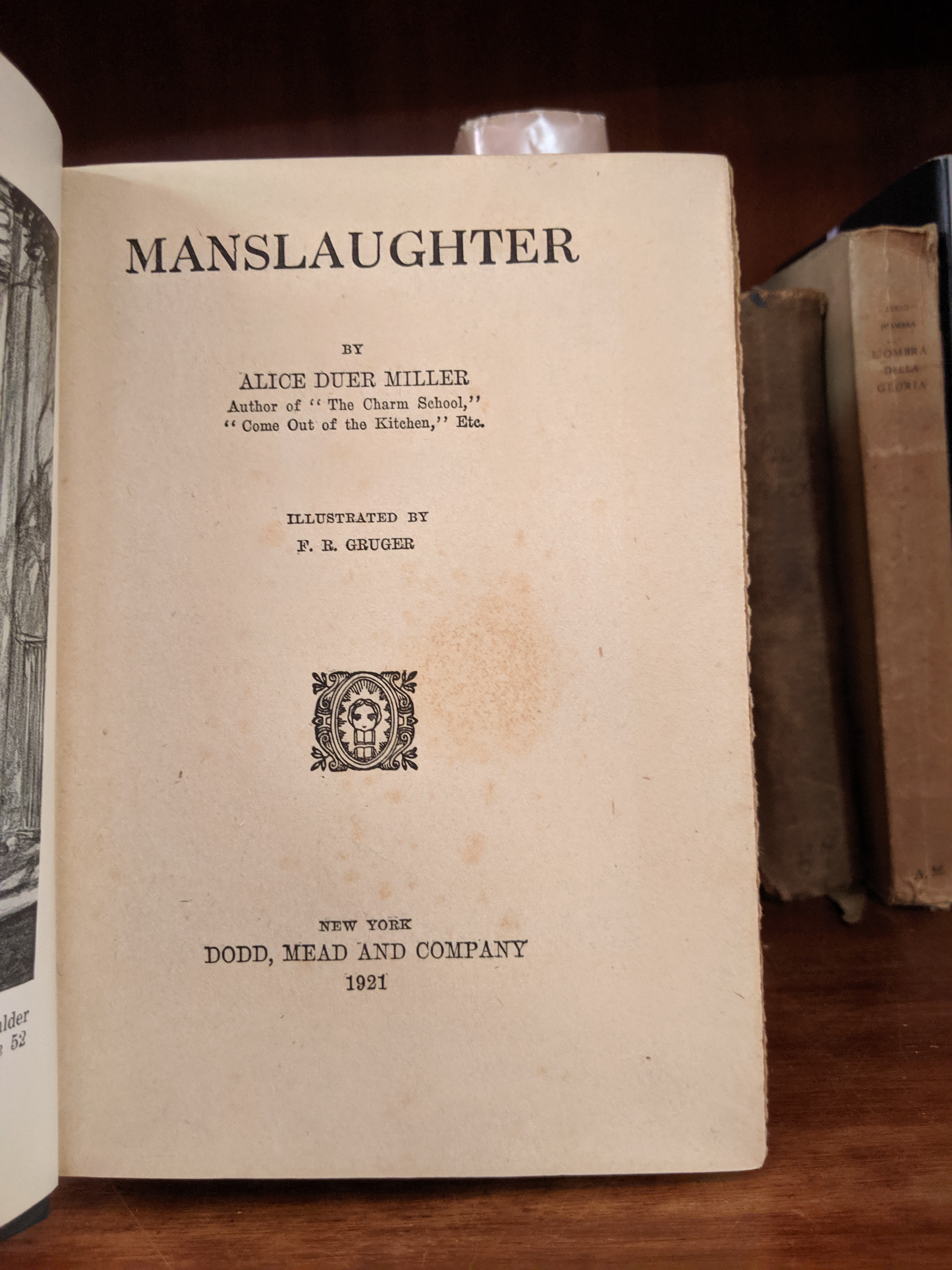
Manslaughter by Alice Duer Miller

== The White Cliffs ==
In 1940, she wrote the verse novel The White Cliffs, about an American girl who coming to London as a tourist, meets and marries a young upper-class Englishman in the period just before World War I. The war begins and he goes to the front. He is killed just before the end of the War, leaving her with a young son. Her son is the heir to the family estate. Despite the pull of her own country and the impoverished condition of the estate, she decides to stay and live the traditional life of a member of the English upper class. The story concludes as World War II commences, and she worries that her son, like his father, will be killed fighting for the country he loves. The poem ends with the lines:

...I am American bred
I have seen much to hate here – much to forgive,
But in a world in which England is finished and dead,
I do not wish to live.

The poem was spectacularly successful on both sides of the Atlantic, selling nearly one million copies – an unheard of number for a book of verse. It was broadcast and recorded by British-American actress Lynn Fontanne (with a symphonic accompaniment), and the story was made into the 1944 film The White Cliffs of Dover. American composer Natalia Raigorodsky composed an opera, The White Cliffs, based on Miller’s poem.

== Personal life ==
Once she graduated, she married Henry Wise Miller on October 5, 1899, at Grace Church Chapel in New York City. Henry asked Alice to marry him three days after their first meeting. He was a Harvard graduate, born in 1877, the son of Lt. Commander Jacob Miller.

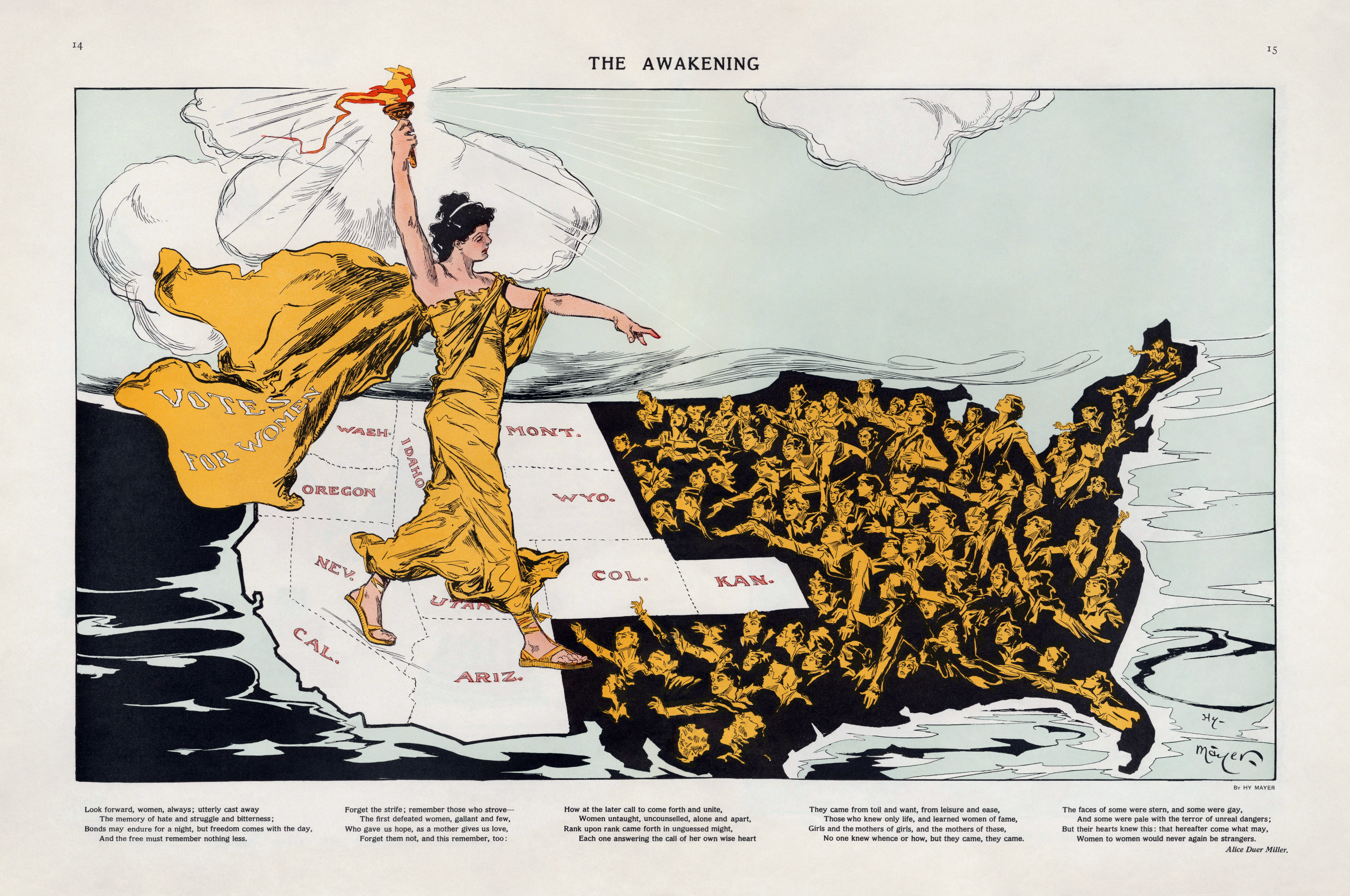
Illustration for one of Miller's suffragist poems, as published in Puck in 1915, showing women's suffrage moving east from the states in the west that had first adopted it

They moved to Costa Rica, where Henry Miller was gambling on land speculation and rubber cultivation. Henry and Alice had their first son Denning Duer Miller in this time period when they were moving back and forth between New York City and Costa Rica. Their investment failed and the family moved back to New York City and struggled for years financially. Alice served as the primary breadwinner for the first decade of the marriage until Henry became a Wall Street stockbroker, funded by his wife's money. The Millers lived somewhat separate lives, deliberately spending part of each year away from each other, and Powers comments that it is possible it was an open marriage. Henry Miller had a long affair with Daisy Bacon. It is not known if Alice Miller was aware of her husband's infidelity, but she may have been. Powers suggests that her long poem Forsaking All Others (1931) is a veiled reference to her own marriage: the protagonist has an affair with a younger woman, but refuses to leave his wife for her.

After a long illness, Alice Duer Miller died in 1942 and was interred at Evergreen Cemetery in Morristown, New Jersey.

== Selected works ==
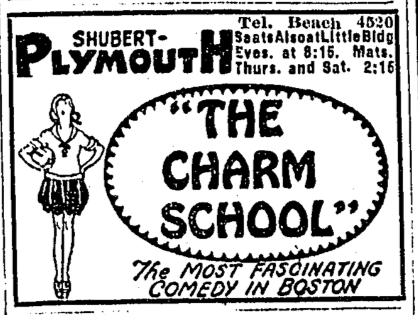
Advertisement for production of Miller's The Charm School, Plymouth Theatre, 1920

- Poems (1896)
- Modern Obstacle (1903)
- Less Than Kin (1909)
- The Blue Arch (1910)
- Things (1914)
- The Burglar and the Blizzard: A Christmas Story (1914)
- Are Women People? a book of rhymes for suffrage times (1915)
- Come Out of the Kitchen (1916)
- Women Are People! (1917)
- The Sturdy Oak (1917), Alice Duer Miller et al.

A composite Novel of American Politics by fourteen American authors

- Ladies Must Live (1917)
- The Happiest Time of Their Lives (1918)
- Wings in the Night (1918)
- The Charm School (1919)
- The Beauty and the Bolshevist (1920)
- Manslaughter (1921)
- Are Parents People? (1924)
- Priceless Pearl (1924)
- The Reluctant Duchess (1925)
- The Springboard (1928)
- Welcome Home (1928)
- Forsaking All Others (1931)
- Gowns by Roberta (1933)
- Come Out of the Pantry (1934)
- The Rising Star (1935)
- And One Was Beautiful (1937)
- The White Cliffs (1940)

== Filmography ==
- Less Than Kin, directed by Donald Crisp (1918, based on the novel Less Than Kin)
- Come Out of the Kitchen, directed by John S. Robertson (1919, based on the novel Come Out of the Kitchen)
- Her First Elopement, directed by Sam Wood (1920, based on the novel Her First Elopement)
- Something Different, directed by Roy William Neill (1920, based on the novel Calderon's Prisoner)
- The Charm School, directed by James Cruze (1921, based on the novel The Charm School)
- Ladies Must Live, directed by George Loane Tucker (1921, based on the novel Ladies Must Live)
- Manslaughter, directed by Cecil B. DeMille (1922, based on the novel Manslaughter)
- Are Parents People?, directed by Malcolm St. Clair (1925, based on the story Are Parents People?)
- Someone to Love, directed by F. Richard Jones (1928, based on the novel The Charm School)
- Honey, directed by Wesley Ruggles (English-language version, 1930, based on the novel Come Out of the Kitchen)
  - Salga de la cocina, directed by Jorge Infante (Spanish-language version, 1931, based on the novel Come Out of the Kitchen)
  - Chérie, directed by Louis Mercanton (French-language version, 1931, based on the novel Come Out of the Kitchen)
  - Every Woman Has Something, directed by Leo Mittler (German-language version, 1931, based on the novel Come Out of the Kitchen)
  - Kärlek måste vi ha, directed by Gustaf Bergman (Swedish-language version, 1931, based on the novel Come Out of the Kitchen)
- Manslaughter, directed by George Abbott (English-language version, 1930, based on the novel Manslaughter)
  - The Incorrigible, directed by Leo Mittler (Spanish-language version, 1931, based on the novel Manslaughter)
  - The Indictment, directed by Dimitri Buchowetzki (French-language version, 1931, based on the novel Manslaughter)
  - Reckless Youth, directed by Leo Mittler (German-language version, 1931, based on the novel Manslaughter)
  - Lika inför lagen, directed by Gustaf Bergman (Swedish-language version, 1931, based on the novel Manslaughter)
- The Princess and the Plumber, directed by Alexander Korda (1930, based on the story The Princess and the Plumber)
- Big Executive, directed by Erle C. Kenton (1933, based on the story Big Executive)
- Roberta, directed by William A. Seiter (1935, based on the novel Gowns By Roberta)
- Come Out of the Pantry, directed by Jack Raymond (UK, 1935, based on the novel Come Out of the Kitchen)
- Collegiate, directed by Ralph Murphy (1936, based on the novel The Charm School)
- The White Cliffs of Dover, directed by Clarence Brown (1944, based on the verse novel The White Cliffs)
- Spring in Park Lane, directed by Herbert Wilcox (UK, 1948, based on the novel Come Out of the Kitchen)
- Sabela de Cambados, directed by Ramón Torrado (Spain, 1949, based on the novel Come Out of the Kitchen)
- Lovely to Look At, directed by Mervyn LeRoy (1952, loosely based on the novel Gowns By Roberta)

=== Screenwriter ===
- The Man with Two Mothers, directed by Paul Bern (1922)
- The Exquisite Sinner, directed by Josef von Sternberg (1926)
- The Last Waltz, directed by Arthur Robison (Germany, 1927)
- Rose Marie, directed by W. S. Van Dyke (1936)
- Wife vs. Secretary, directed by Clarence Brown (1936)
- And One Was Beautiful, directed by Robert B. Sinclair (1940)
- Irene, directed by Herbert Wilcox (1940)

== Modern works and inspiration ==
Composer Edna Yeh set selections from Are Women People? to music. The work was commissioned and performed by Voci Women's Vocal Ensemble.
