= Philip H. Cooper =

US-american officer, rear admiral in the US-Navy

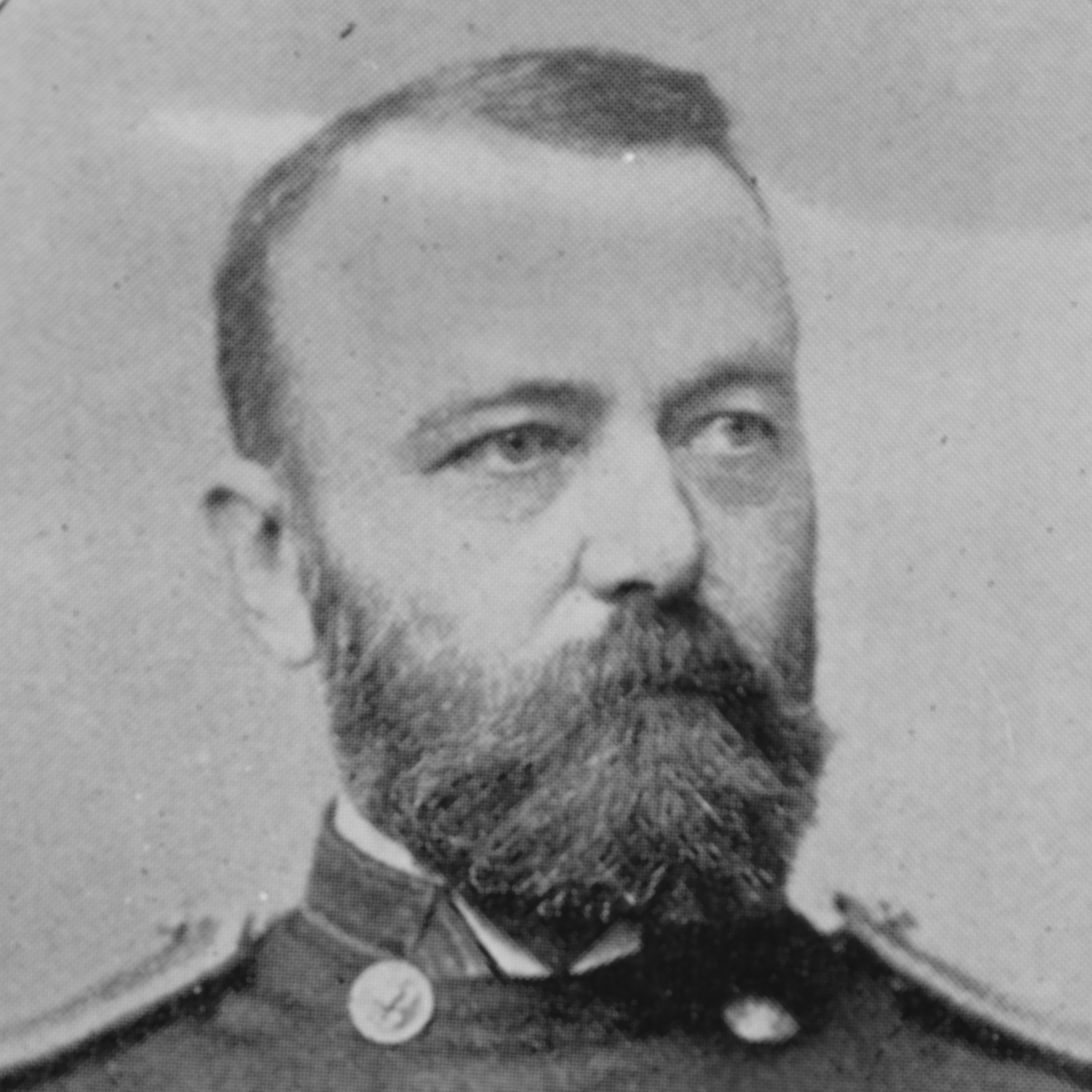
- Cooper c. 1892
- Born: 5 August 1844; Camden, New York, US
- Died: 29 December 1912 (aged 68); Morristown, New Jersey, US
- Burial place: Evergreen Cemetery, Morristown, New Jersey
- Military career
- Allegiance: United States of America
- Branch: United States Navy
- Service years: 1863–1904
- Rank: Rear Admiral
- Commands: USS Alliance; USS Swatara; USS San Francisco; USS Chicago; United States Naval Academy; USS Iowa; Senior Squadron Commander, Asiatic Fleet; Southern Squadron, Asiatic Fleet; Cruiser Squadron, Asiatic Fleet; United States Asiatic Fleet
- Conflicts: American Civil War Union blockade Battle of Mobile Bay

Signature
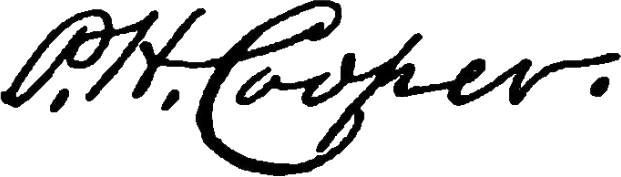

Rear Admiral Philip Henry Cooper (5 August 1844 – 29 December 1912) was an officer in the United States Navy. He fought in the American Civil War and served as Superintendent of the United States Naval Academy and as commander-in-chief of the United States Asiatic Fleet.

== Naval career ==
Cooper was born in Camden, New York, on 5 August 1844, the son of Hiram H. and Delia A. Cooper. He was appointed as an acting midshipman from New York's 20th congressional district on 28 September 1860 and entered the United States Naval Academy in Annapolis, Maryland, as a member of the class of 1864; the academy moved to Newport, Rhode Island, after the American Civil War broke out in April 1861. On 16 July 1862, the rank of acting midshipman was abolished, and Cooper's rank changed to midshipman. On 21 November 1862, Cooper, Henry Glass, and Charles McGregor were appointed acting assistant professors of mathematics at the Naval Academy while all three were still Academy students. Cooper was commissioned as an acting ensign on 28 May 1863 and was assigned to the sloop-of-war USS Macedonian, serving as an academy training ship, the same day.

Due to the wartime requirement for officers in the rapidly expanding fleet, Cooper – ranked fifth in his graduating class – was detached early from the Naval Academy on 1 October 1863 and assigned to the steam sloop-of-war USS Richmond in the West Gulf Blockading Squadron in the Gulf of Mexico for the rest of the Civil War.

Aboard Richmond, he saw action in the Union blockade of the Confederate States of America and in the Battle of Mobile Bay on 5 August 1864.

After the conclusion of the Civil War, Cooper was assigned to the sidewheel steam frigate USS Powhatan in the South Pacific Squadron on 28 July 1865. While aboard Powhatan, he was promoted to master on 10 November 1865 and to lieutenant on 10 November 1866. On 31 December 1867 he was transferred to the staff of the U.S. Naval Academy, where he was assistant to the Commandant of Midshipmen and assistant instructor in seamanship and naval tactics and was promoted to lieutenant commander on 12 March 1868. He then returned to sea, being assigned to the sailing frigate USS Sabine on 30 April 1869 while she was serving as a training ship, and made a midshipman cruise to Europe and the Mediterranean aboard her. On 9 September 1870, he became a member of the Tehauntepec and Nicaragua Surveying Expedition.

On 31 May 1871, Cooper detached from the expedition and reported for duty at the New York Navy Yard in Brooklyn, New York, where he performed duty as equipment officer. He transferred to the screw sloop-of-war USS Congress on 20 September 1871. Cooper next returned to duty on the staff of the Naval Academy, assigned there on 10 July 1872. On 19 July 1875, he was ordered to the Naval Torpedo Station in Newport, Rhode Island, for torpedo instruction, then was transferred on 17 August 1875 to the Naval Experimental Battery at Annapolis, Maryland. An assignment as assistant hydrographic inspector in the United States Coast Survey office followed, beginning on 28 June 1878.

Cooper detached from the Coast Survey on 7 November 1878 to take up special duty in the Bureau of Navigation and was promoted to commander on 1 November 1879. He left the bureau on 7 March 1881 to become commanding officer of the screw gunboat USS Alliance while Alliance was under repair. He returned to the Bureau of Navigation on 1 October 1881 for a brief period of special duty before taking command of the screw sloop-of-war USS Swatara in the Asiatic Squadron on 17 October 1881. He left Swatara on 20 May 1884 and had duty at the Norfolk Navy Yard in Portsmouth, Virginia, from 1 April 1886 until 1888. While there, he was appointed on 18 February 1887 as senior member of a board to survey all stores and materials at the navy yard. He served on several general courts-martial during 1889.

On 22 January 1890, Cooper was ordered back to Swatara for a second tour as her commanding officer, and he took command of her in March 1890. On 30 January 1891, he received orders to detach from Swatara on 7 February 1891. He then served on several courts martial and courts of inquiry during 1891 before being ordered on 18 November 1891 to special duty on the Board on Navy Yard Reorganization.

Cooper's next duty was as a member of the Board of Inspection and Survey, to which he was assigned on 3 June 1892. While on the board, he served on several courts martial, oversaw the sea trials of the screw steamer USS Essex, the armored cruiser USS New York, the protected cruisers USS Detroit, USS Montgomery, and USS Columbia, and the gunboat USS Bancroft, and was promoted to captain on 11 April 1894.

Leaving the board, Cooper received command of the protected cruiser USS San Francisco on 18 July 1894. On 7 November 1894 he detached from San Francisco with orders to become Superintendent of the U.S. Naval Academy, effective 15 November 1894. He remained superintendent until detached from the Academy on 5 July 1898.

On 7 July 1898, Cooper reported to the protected cruiser USS Chicago to oversee her fitting out after a lengthy overhaul, and he became her commanding officer when she was recommissioned on 1 December 1898. After detaching from Chicago on 5 October 1899, he took a leave of absence, then received orders on 5 May 1900 to report aboard the battleship USS Iowa as her commanding officer, effective 9 June 1900. He detached from Iowa on 5 March 1901 and awaited orders until his assignment on 7 October 1901 to serve on a court martial at Tutuila in the Tutuila Islands (later American Samoa).

Promoted to rear admiral on 9 February 1902, Cooper became the president of a general court martial at Port Royal, South Carolina, on 10 April 1902. In 1902 he was responsible for the defense of the United States East Coast from Barnegat, New Jersey, north to the border with Canada and in July 1902 took part in combined U.S. Navy-United States Army maneuvers with his headquarters at the Naval War College in Newport, Rhode Island, and using the gunboat USS Hist as his flagship.

Cooper reported for duty on 6 February 1903 as Senior Squadron Commander in the Asiatic Fleet. On 1 March 1903, he assumed command of the fleet's Southern Squadron and on 2 July 1903 of its Cruiser Squadron. On 21 March 1904, he assumed command of the entire Asiatic Fleet. However, his health went into decline, and on 1 or 11 July 1904 (sources vary), Cooper detached from the Asiatic Fleet. On 5 August 1904, he retired from the Navy.

== Personal life ==
Cooper's first wife was the former Addie Lou Paine. He married his second wife, Sarah Lawrence Stuart (1851–1881), on 3 October 1871. After she died, he married his third wife, Katherine J. Foote Saltus (1853–1937) on 24 June 1884. He fathered six children, Gerald Cooper (died 1887), Geraldine Cooper (died 1885), Stuart Cooper (1873–1924), Philip Benson Cooper (1877–1956), Dorothy Bradford Cooper Patterson (1889–1972), and Leslie B. Cooper (1894–1944); the latter became a nationally recognized helicopter expert and a United States Army Air Forces lieutenant colonel before dying in the crash of a U.S. Army Air Forces training plane in Pennsville, New Jersey in October 1944.

== Death ==
Cooper apparently contracted chronic malaria while in Nicaragua in 1870 and 1871 on the surveying expedition. Repeated bouts of malaria took a toll on his health, which became poor enough in 1904 to force him to relinquish command of the Asiatic Fleet and retire. He returned to the United States but never completely recovered, and died at Morristown, New Jersey, on 29 December 1912 of interstitial myocarditis and general arteriosclerosis.

Cooper is buried at Evergreen Cemetery in Morristown.

== Notes ==
Military offices
Preceded by Robert L. Phythian	Superintendent of United States Naval Academy; 15 November 1894 – 5 July 1898	Succeeded by Frederick V. McNair Sr.
Preceded by Robley D. Evans	Commander-in-Chief, United States Asiatic Fleet; 21 March 1904–1 or 11 July 1904	Succeeded by Yates Stirling
