= Frank D. Abell =

American politician

Frank Dale Abell

Member of the New Jersey Senate from Morris County
- In office 1926–1931
- Preceded by: Arthur Whitney
- Succeeded by: David Young Jr.

Member of the New Jersey General Assembly
- In office 1925–1926
- Preceded by: David F. Barkman
- Succeeded by: Howard F. Barrett

Morris County Freeholder
- In office 1913–1925

Personal details
- Born: July 26, 1878 Morristown, New Jersey, U.S.
- Died: November 21, 1964 (aged 86)
- Party: Republican
- Spouse: Elvira Dean

Frank Dale Abell (July 26, 1878 – November 21, 1964) was a bank executive, government official, and politician. He was a Republican who served on the Morris County, New Jersey, Board of Chosen Freeholders from 1913 to 1925, in the New Jersey General Assembly in 1925 and 1926, and in the New Jersey Senate from 1926 to 1931. Abell was the treasurer of the Federal Farm and Loan Association from 1915 to 1918.

== Career ==
Abell was the son of Erastus Corning Abell, a financier with Richard P. Herrick & Company, and had three siblings. He was born in Morristown, New Jersey, where he attended local schools. He worked for a finance company as an assistant postal clerk and, in 1898, joined the First National Bank of Morristown.

Abell became president of the bank in 1930. In 1944, the bank merged with the National Iron Bank, and he became chairman of both banks. Abell served in this capacity until 1963 and also served as an official of the Greystone Park State Hospital, the Morristown Y.M.C.A., and the Morris County Grange. He was a director of the Jersey Central Power and Light Company. A collection of his papers is at the Morristown and Morris Township libraries' genealogy center.

== Personal life ==
Abell married Elvira Dean in 1918. Together, they had two children, Alice Dean Abell (Caulkins) and Frank Dale Abell, Jr. Abell died on November 21, 1964. He was buried at the Evergreen Cemetery in Morristown.
