= Billie Cooper =

African American transgender activist (born 1958)

Ms. Billie Cooper
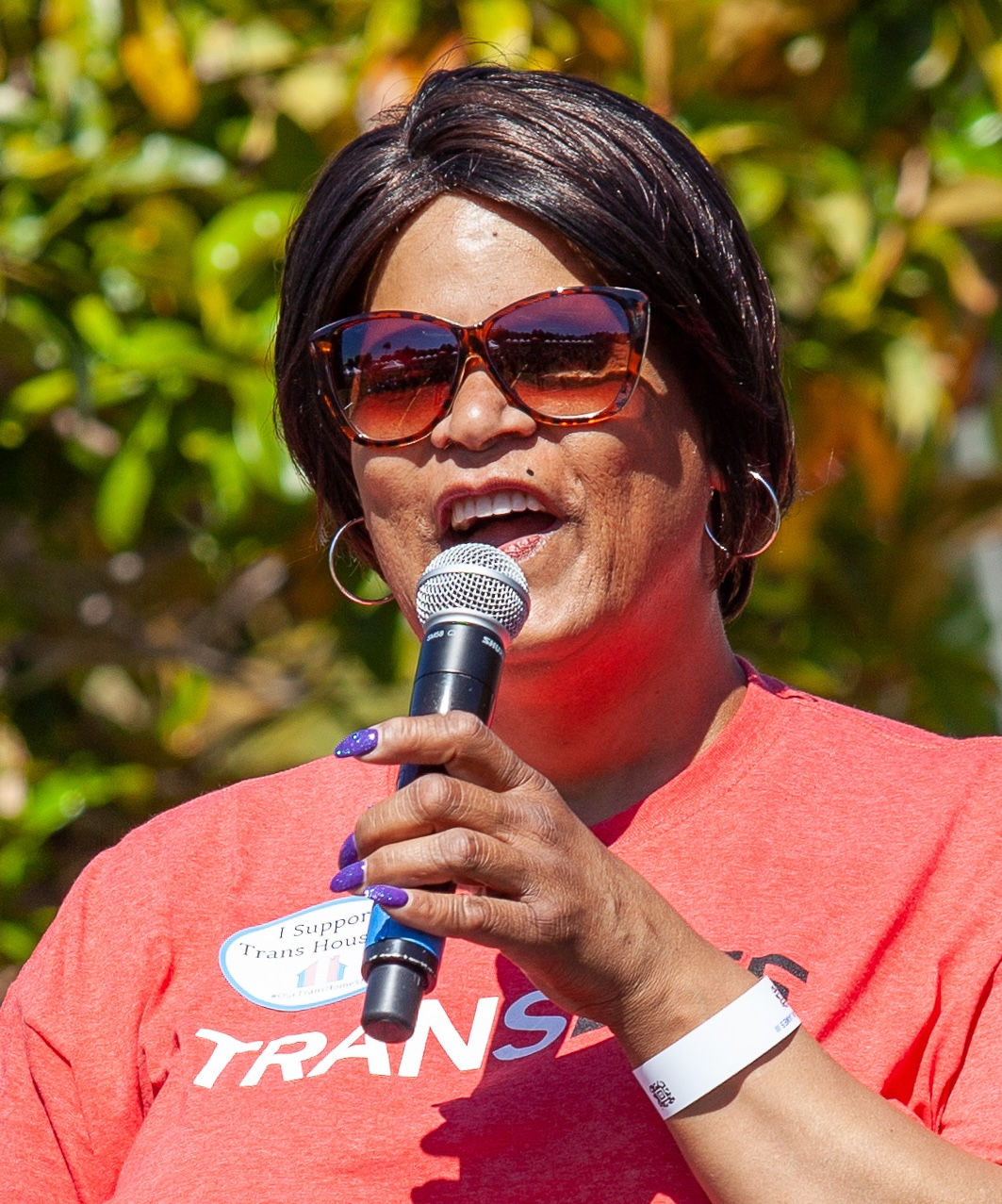
- Ms. Billie Cooper in 2019
- Born: October 29, 1958 (age 67); Philadelphia, Pennsylvania, U.S.
- Years active: 1982—present
- Known for: Transgender and HIV advocacy

Ms. Billie Cooper (born October 29, 1958) is an African American transgender rights activist. She has been advocating for Black, transgender, and HIV rights in San Francisco since the 1980s.

== Early life and military service ==
Cooper was born on October 29, 1958 in Philadelphia, one of three siblings in a poor family. Her parents, a mechanic and a vocational nurse, had to work at multiple jobs to make ends meet.

Beginning in elementary school, Cooper realized she was attracted to boys, and that she disliked her body parts; she was "often asking God, 'Why wasn’t I born a little girl?'" As her community had no knowledge of what it meant to be transgender at that time, she was perceived as gay. She was teased and taunted by classmates for being effeminate, and in 8th grade she was angrily rebuffed when she expressed her feelings to a boy she fell in love with.

After high school graduation, Cooper began to explore the local gay club scene. In 1975, she enrolled in the United States Navy at the age of 17. She remained in the service for eight years, including six years stationed at Pearl Harbor, where she met and befriended many more gay people. She received an honorable discharge in 1982.

== Activism and health ==
On a trip to San Francisco in 1979, Cooper met and befriended Miss Major Griffin-Gracy, finding her work with the community inspiring. Following her discharge from the Navy in 1982, Cooper moved to San Francisco's Tenderloin district, and began doing advocacy work with Miss Major. She also performed in shows at various clubs in San Francisco and Oakland.

In May 1985, Cooper was diagnosed with HIV. She became a client of the San Francisco AIDS Foundation (SFAF), and advocated for Black people living with HIV to receive equal treatment. At the time she became a client of SFAF, she said regarding Black people: "We were last to get treatment, we were last to get doctors, we were last to be diagnosed". In 2010, Cooper founded TransLife, a weekly support group at SFAF specifically for Black transgender people living with HIV. The group has since opened to people of multiple races and experiences. In addition to SFAF, Cooper has been involved with the Black Coalition on AIDS, the UCSF AIDS Clinic, the AIDS Project East Bay, and the Shanti Project.

Cooper struggled with drug addiction throughout the 1980s. She entered treatment in 1990 and became clean and sober by 2002. That same year, after being physically attacked on the street, she learned that she had a tumor in her left eye. She underwent radiation and chemotherapy, but had to have her eye removed in 2009. She had additional surgeries after her cancer returned in 2015.

Cooper has served on the Castro Cultural Community Advisory Board, and as Community Grand Marshal for San Francisco Pride in 2019. She ran for District 6 supervisor in the 2022 San Francisco Board of Supervisors election; Cooper and fellow Black trans activist Honey Mahogany both lost to Matt Dorsey.
