= Melenie Mahinamalamalama Eleneke =

Hawaiian spiritual healer and transgender rights activist (1959–2013)

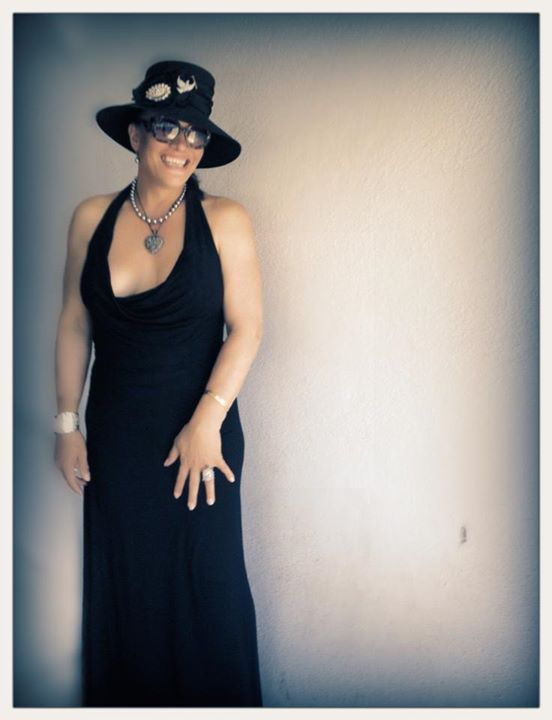
- Eleneke in San Francisco
- Born: December 25, 1959; Hawaii, United States
- Died: September 9, 2013 (aged 53); San Francisco, California, United States
- Occupations: Spiritual healer; Hula dancer; Transgender rights activist (TGI Justice Project)

Melenie Mahinamalamalama Eleneke (December 25, 1959 – September 9, 2013) was an American transgender rights activist of the Transgender, Gender Variant, and Intersex Justice Project (TGIJP) in San Francisco, hula dancer and spiritual healer.

== Early life and education ==
Eleneke was born December 25, 1959, in Honolulu, Hawai’i. She was the youngest child of Jerett Kalani Eleneke and Alene Ku’ukama’aloha Parker Eleneke-Pa’s five children. Her siblings are Shalei, Wayne, Paul, and Charles Eleneke and Char Thompson.

She attended Kailua High School in Honolulu and graduated in 1977. She transitioned while in high school.

She studied Social Justice at San Francisco State University.

== Activism ==
Eleneke was a long-serving community leader with TGIJP, starting in 2004. Among her different roles were member of the Leadership Team in 2007, director of Development and Administration from 2008-2009 and editor of the prison newsletter, Stiletto, from 2008. As part of her work, she visited trans people at California Medical Facility (CMF) in Vacaville and other prisons. She organized letter-writing events for prisoners in California and throughout the country. She offered workshops on spiritual healing to trans people coming out of prison and jail.

In February 2008, she and Miss Major Griffin-Gracy addressed the UN Committee on the Elimination of Racial Discrimination in Geneva, Switzerland on the lack of economic opportunity for transgender women of color in the United States.

Eleneke was an active member of The Ladies of Keolalaulani Halau and the House of Valenciaga. She was a founder of a transgender women of color hula group and a long-time leader in the Asian & Pacific Islander Wellness Center.

Melenie died on September 9, 2013, in Daly City, California.

== See also ==
- Janetta Johnson
- Miss Major Griffin-Gracy
