= 2022 San Francisco Board of Supervisors election =

- November 8, 2022

5 of the 11 seats of the San Francisco Board of Supervisors
	Majority party
Party	Democratic
Seats before	11
Seats won	5
Seats after	11
Seat change	Steady

The 2022 San Francisco Board of Supervisors elections were held on November 8, 2022. Five of the eleven seats on the San Francisco Board of Supervisors were up for election. The election was conducted with ranked-choice voting.

Four of the five incumbent supervisors were re-elected except for Gordon Mar, who lost to Joel Engardio by a small margin in District 4. Two incumbents, Catherine Stefani and Shamann Walton, were re-elected without any opposition.

== Results ==
=== District 2 ===
San Francisco's 2nd supervisorial district election
- November 8, 2022
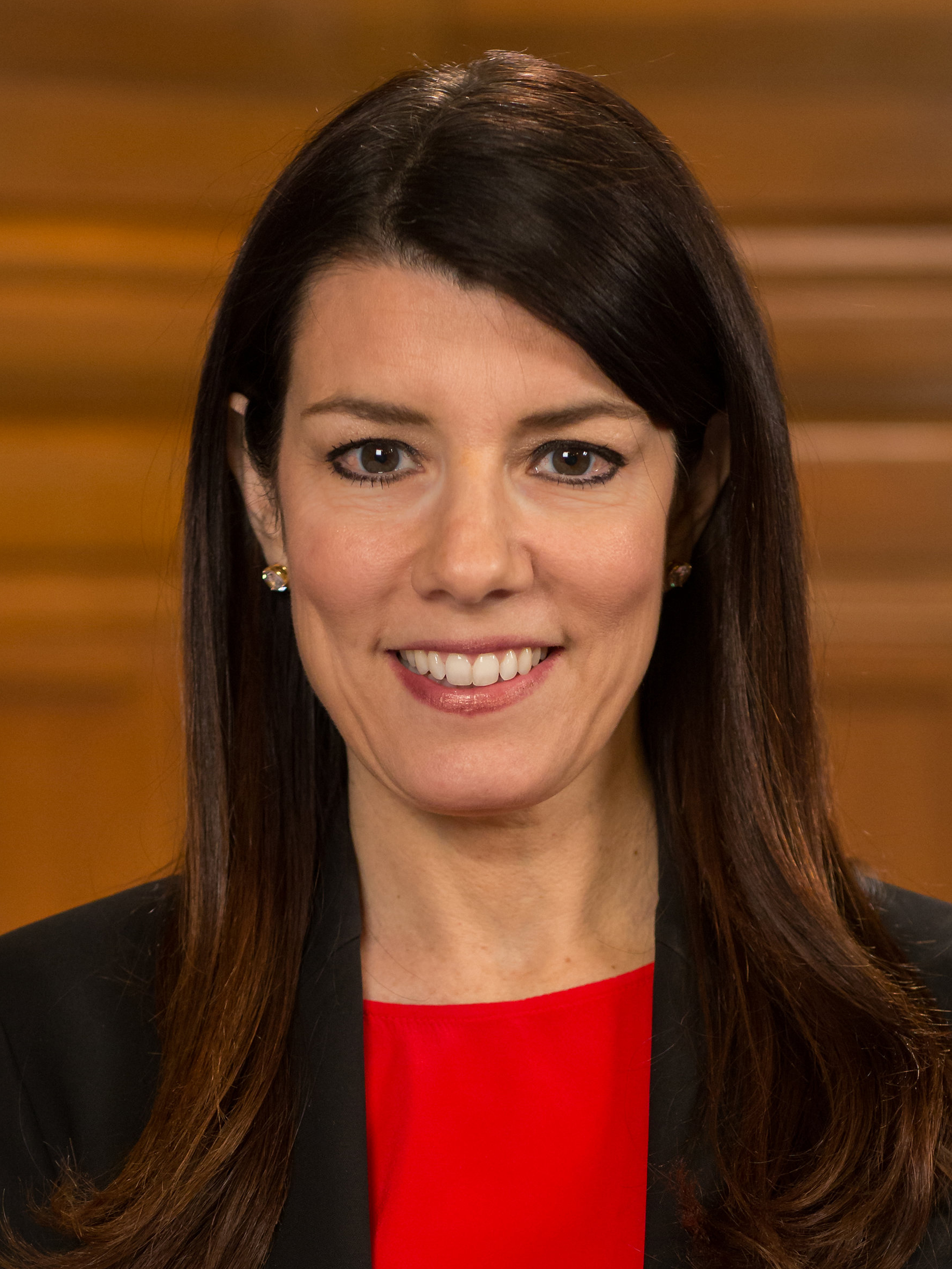
Candidate	Catherine Stefani
First round	22,111; 100.00%
Supervisor before election
Catherine Stefani
Elected Supervisor
Catherine Stefani

The incumbent Supervisor was Catherine Stefani, who was appointed to the seat in 2018 and sought reelection for a second full term. Stefani ran unopposed in the election as no other candidate was on the ballot.

==== Candidates ====
- Catherine Stefani, incumbent supervisor

==== Results ====
District 2 supervisorial election, 2022
Candidate	Votes	%
Catherine Stefani (incumbent)	22,111	100.00
Total votes	22,111	100.00

=== District 4 ===
San Francisco's 4th supervisorial district election
- November 8, 2022
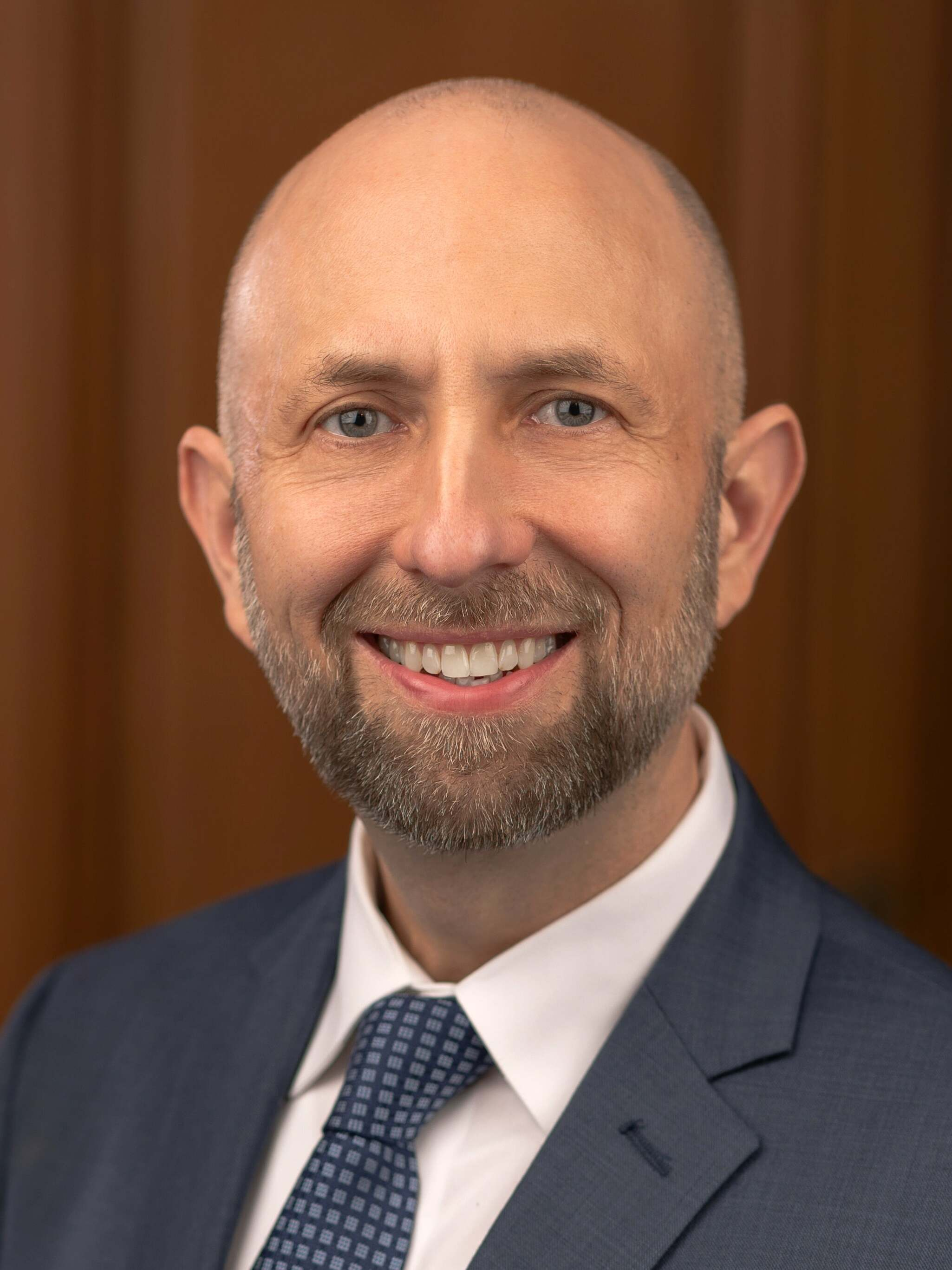

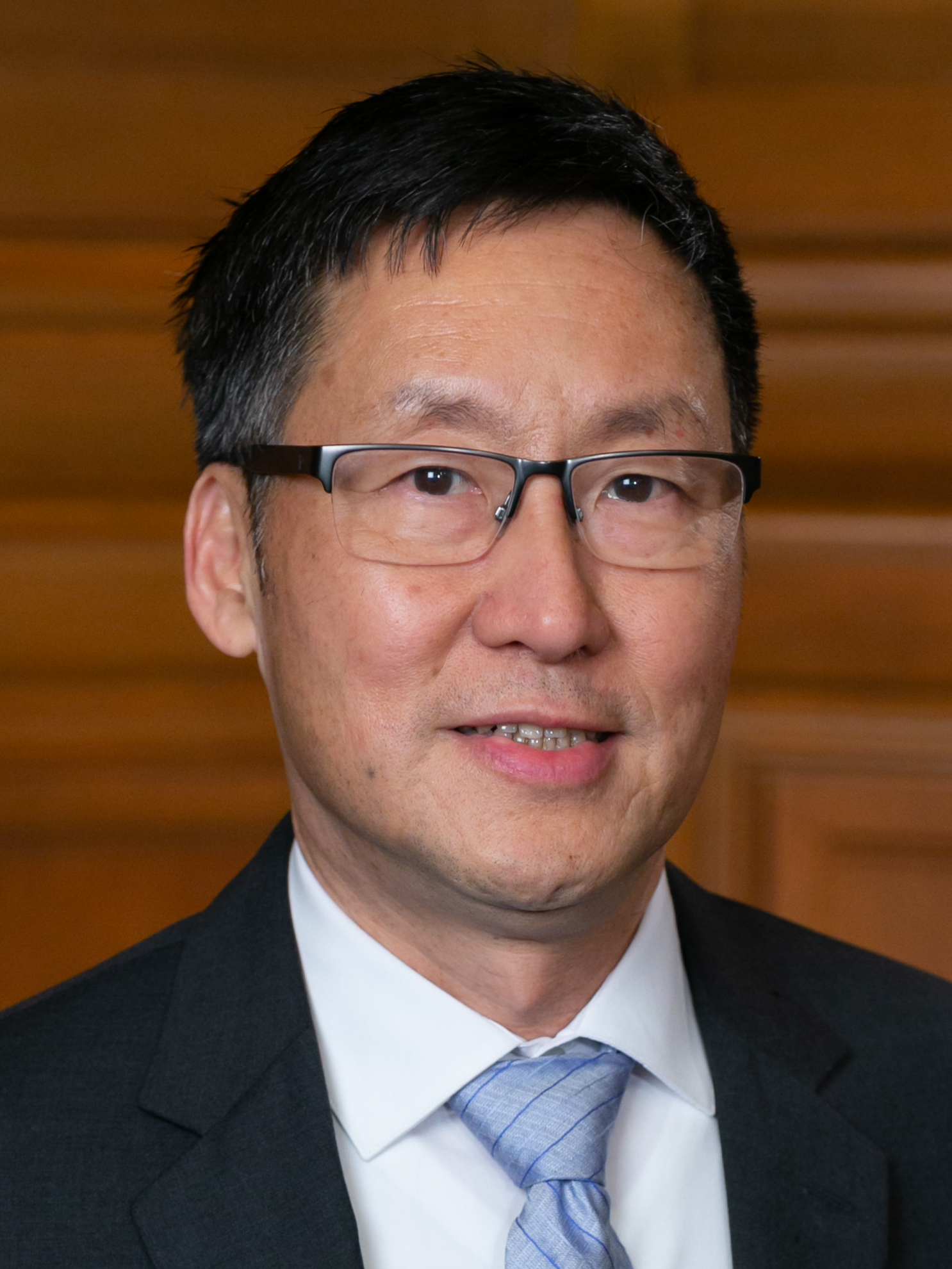
Candidate	Joel Engardio	Gordon Mar
First round	13,634; 50.84%	13,181; 49.16%
Supervisor before election
Gordon Mar
Elected Supervisor
Joel Engardio

District 4 encompassed Sunset District, Parkside, and Pine Lake. The incumbent Supervisor was Gordon Mar, who was first elected in 2018 and sought reelection for a second term. In the election, Mar was unseated by Joel Engardio, the executive director of the Stop Crime SF advocacy group who was described as a moderate Democrat. Engardio's win made him the first candidate in 20 years to unseat a previously elected incumbent supervisor. It was also the first time the district elected a non-Asian supervisor since created in 2000, as well as the first openly gay supervisor to represent a district in western San Francisco.

==== Candidates ====
- Gordon Mar, incumbent supervisor
- Joel Engardio, executive director of Stop Crime SF

==== Results ====
District 4 supervisorial election, 2022
Candidate	Votes	%
Joel Engardio	13,634	50.84
Gordon Mar (incumbent)	13,181	49.16
Total votes	26,815	100.00

=== District 6 ===
San Francisco's 6th supervisorial district election
- November 8, 2022
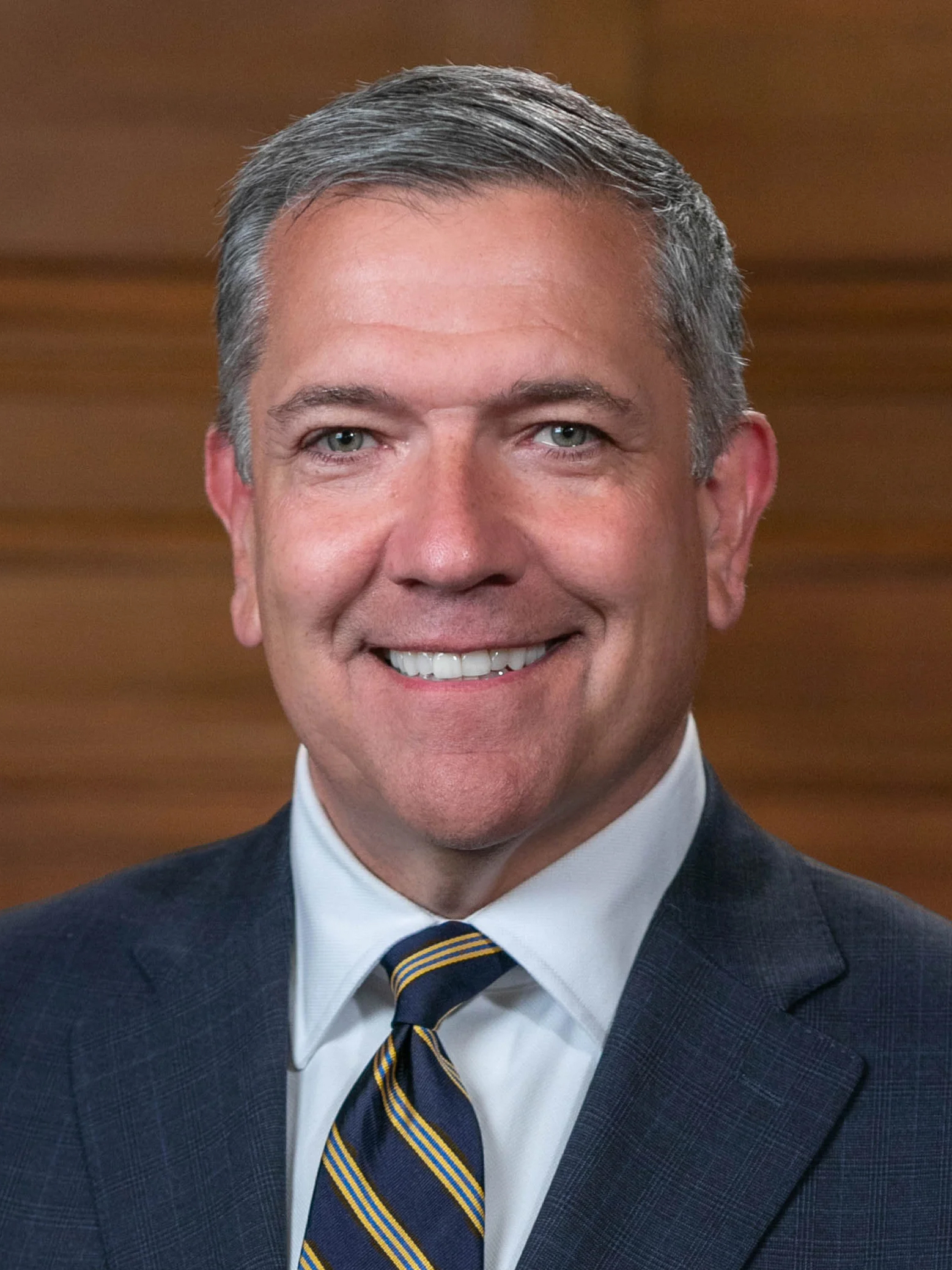

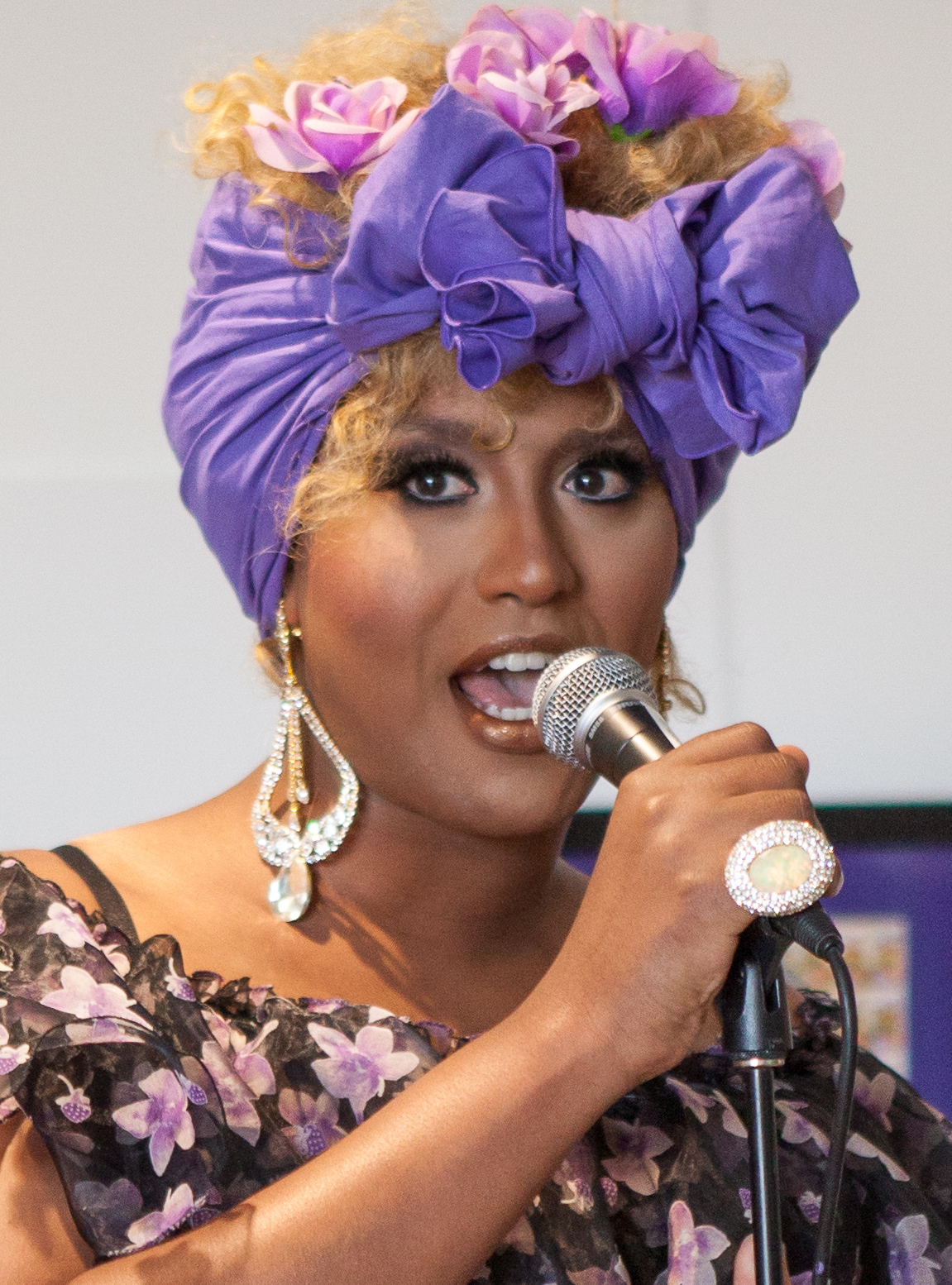
Candidate	Matt Dorsey	Honey Mahogany
First round	8,264; 50.79%	7,100; 43.64%
Maximum round	8,543; 53.10%	7,547; 46.90%
Supervisor before election
Matt Dorsey
Elected Supervisor
Matt Dorsey

The incumbent supervisor was Matt Dorsey, who was first appointed to the seat in 2022 by Mayor London Breed in order to fill the remainder of Matt Haney's term. Haney had resigned the seat after he was elected to the California State Assembly. Dorsey ran for a full term, and won the election against Honey Mahogany.

==== Candidates ====
- Matt Dorsey, incumbent supervisor
- Honey Mahogany, drag performer and activist
- Ms. Billie Cooper, community activist
- Cherelle Jackson

==== Results ====
District 6 supervisorial election, 2022
Candidate	Votes	%
Matt Dorsey (incumbent)	8,264	50.79
Honey Mahogany	7,100	43.64
Cherelle Jackson	540	3.32
Billie Cooper	5,366	2.25
Valid votes	13,882	87.29%
Invalid or blank votes	2,388	12.71
Total votes	16,270	100.00
Ranked choice voting — Pass 3
Matt Dorsey (incumbent)	8,543	53.10
Honey Mahogany	7,547	46.90
Exhausted votes	172	1.07%
Total votes	16,090	100.00

==== Ranked-choice vote distribution ====
Candidate	Pass 1	Pass 2	Pass 3
Matt Dorsey (incumbent)	8,264	8,355	8,543
Honey Mahogany	7,100	7,253	7,547
Cherelle Jackson	540	615	Eliminated
Billie Cooper	366	Eliminated	
Eligible ballots	13,837	13,700	13,522
Exhausted ballots	45	127	172
Total	16,270	16,223	16,090

=== District 8 ===
San Francisco's 8th supervisorial district election
- November 8, 2022
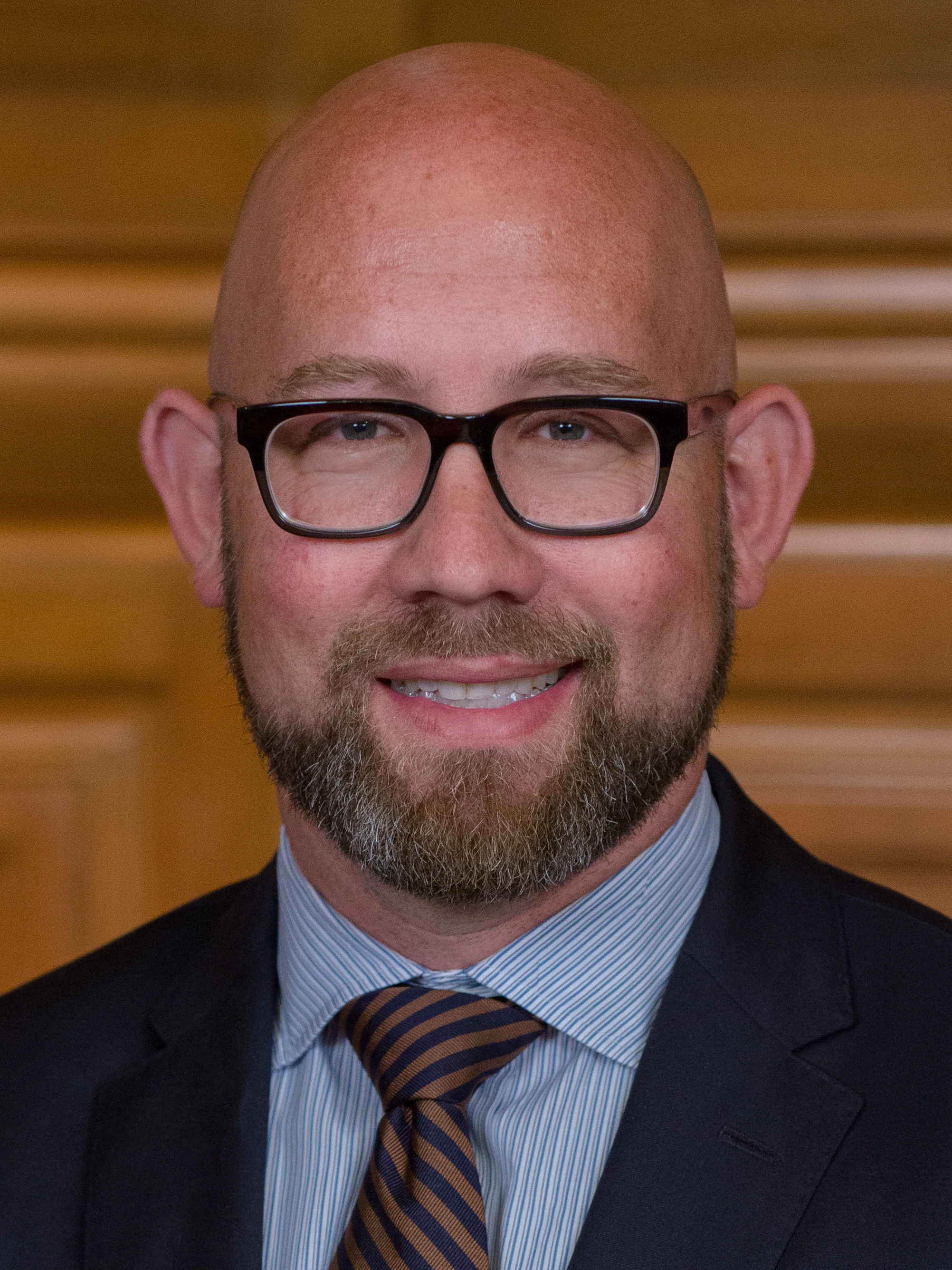

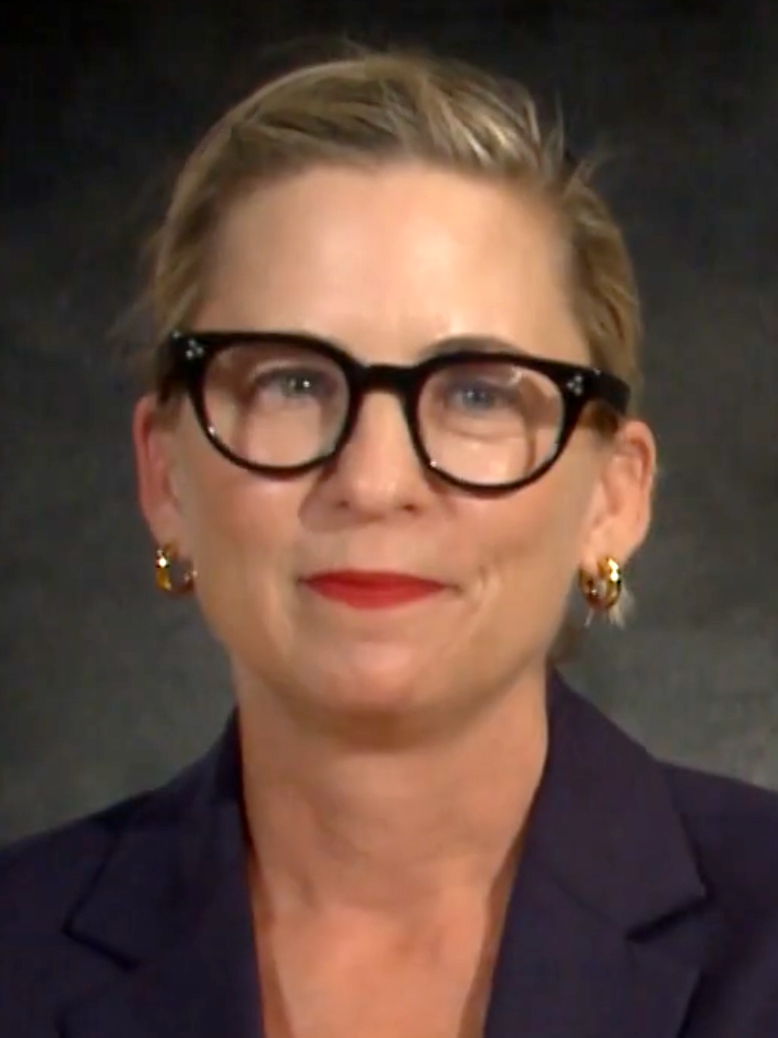
Candidate	Rafael Mandelman	Kate Stoia
First round	27,391; 77.45%	7,379; 22.53%
Supervisor before election
Rafael Mandelman
Elected Supervisor
Rafael Mandelman

District 8 encompassed the Castro District, Noe Valley, and Glen Park. The incumbent supervisor was Rafael Mandelman, who was first elected in 2018 in a special election. He was re-elected in a landslide against lawyer Kate Stoia.

==== Candidates ====
- Rafael Mandelman, incumbent supervisor
- Kate Stoia, lawyer

==== Results ====
District 8 supervisorial election, 2022
Candidate	Votes	%
Rafael Mandelman (incumbent)	27,391	77.45
Kate Stoia	7,379	22.53
Total votes	34,770	100.00

=== District 10 ===
San Francisco's 10th supervisorial district election
- November 8, 2022
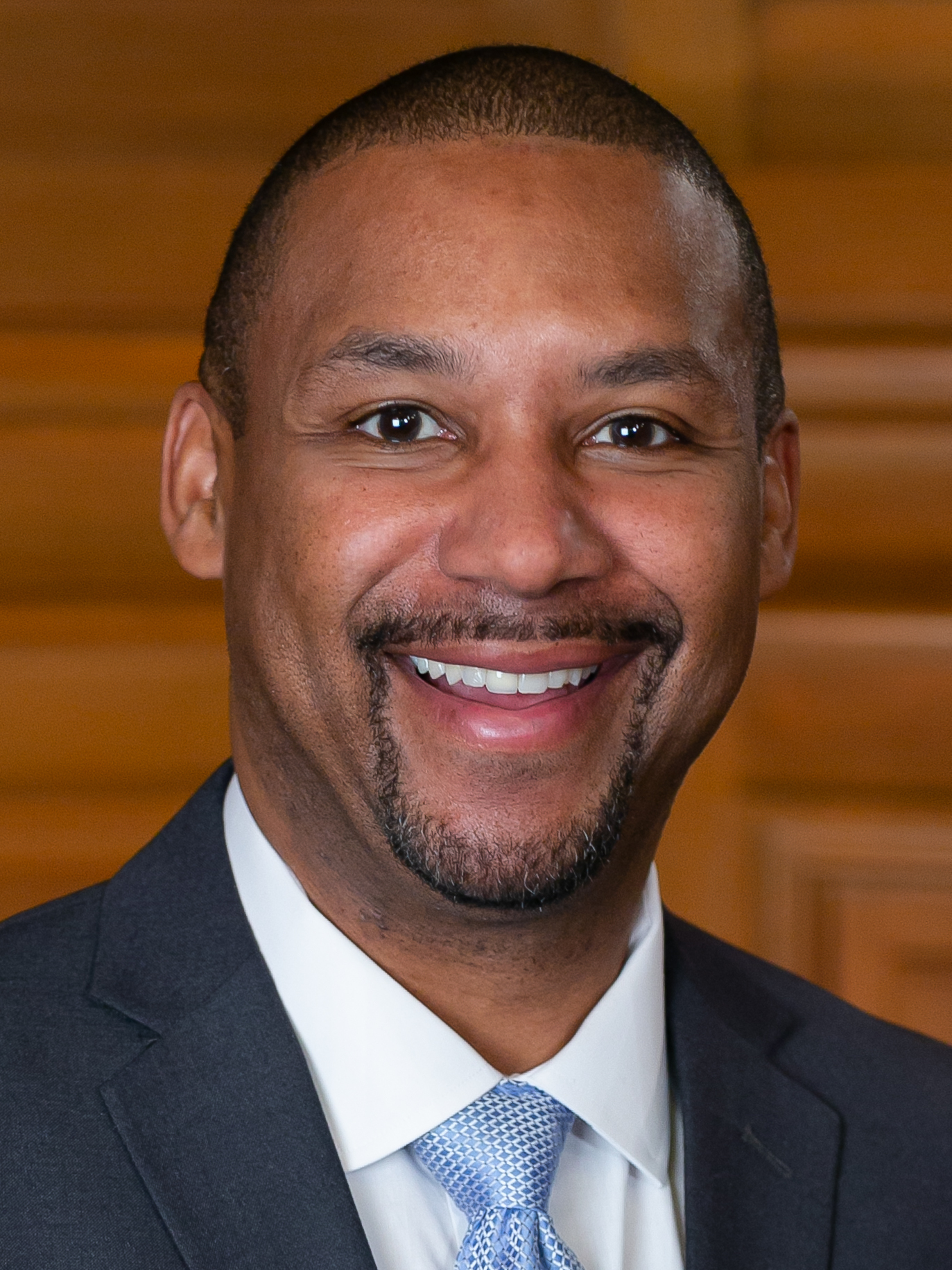

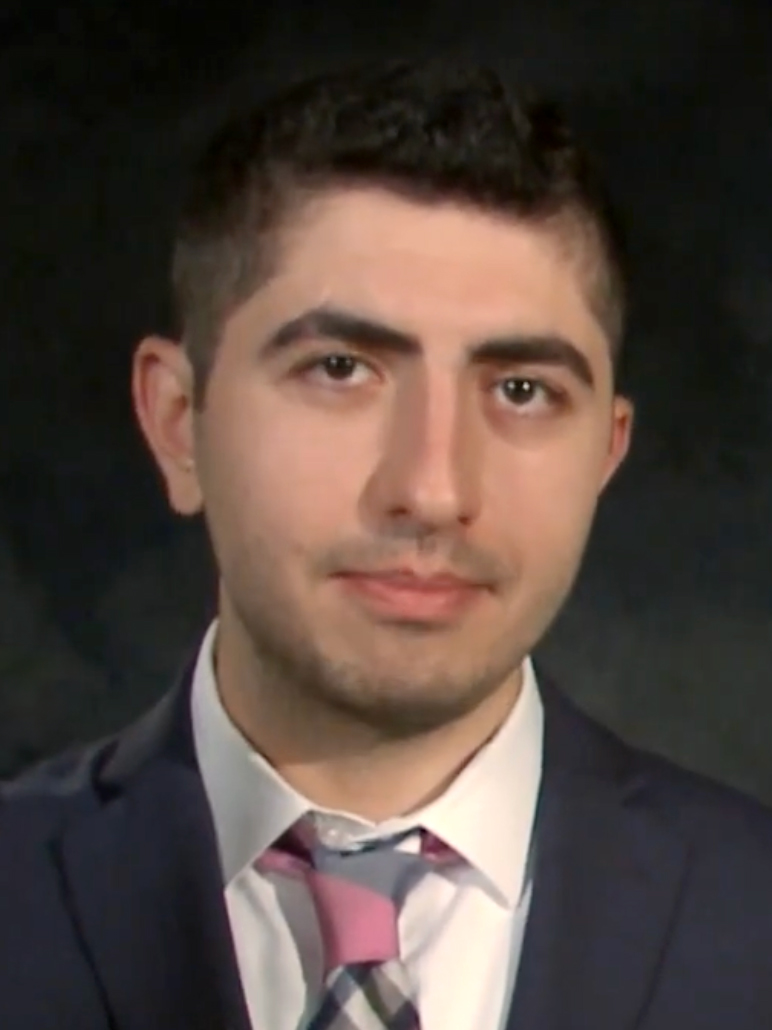
Candidate	Shamann Walton	Brian Adam
First round	12,217; 72.64%	4,602; 27.36%
Supervisor before election
Shamann Walton
Elected Supervisor
Shamann Walton

==== Candidates ====
- Shamann Walton, incumbent supervisor
- Brian Adam

==== Results ====
District 10 supervisorial election, 2022
Candidate	Votes	%
Shamann Walton (incumbent)	12,217	72.64
Brian Adam	4,602	27.36
Total votes	16,819	100.00
