= TGI Justice Project =

American transgender organization

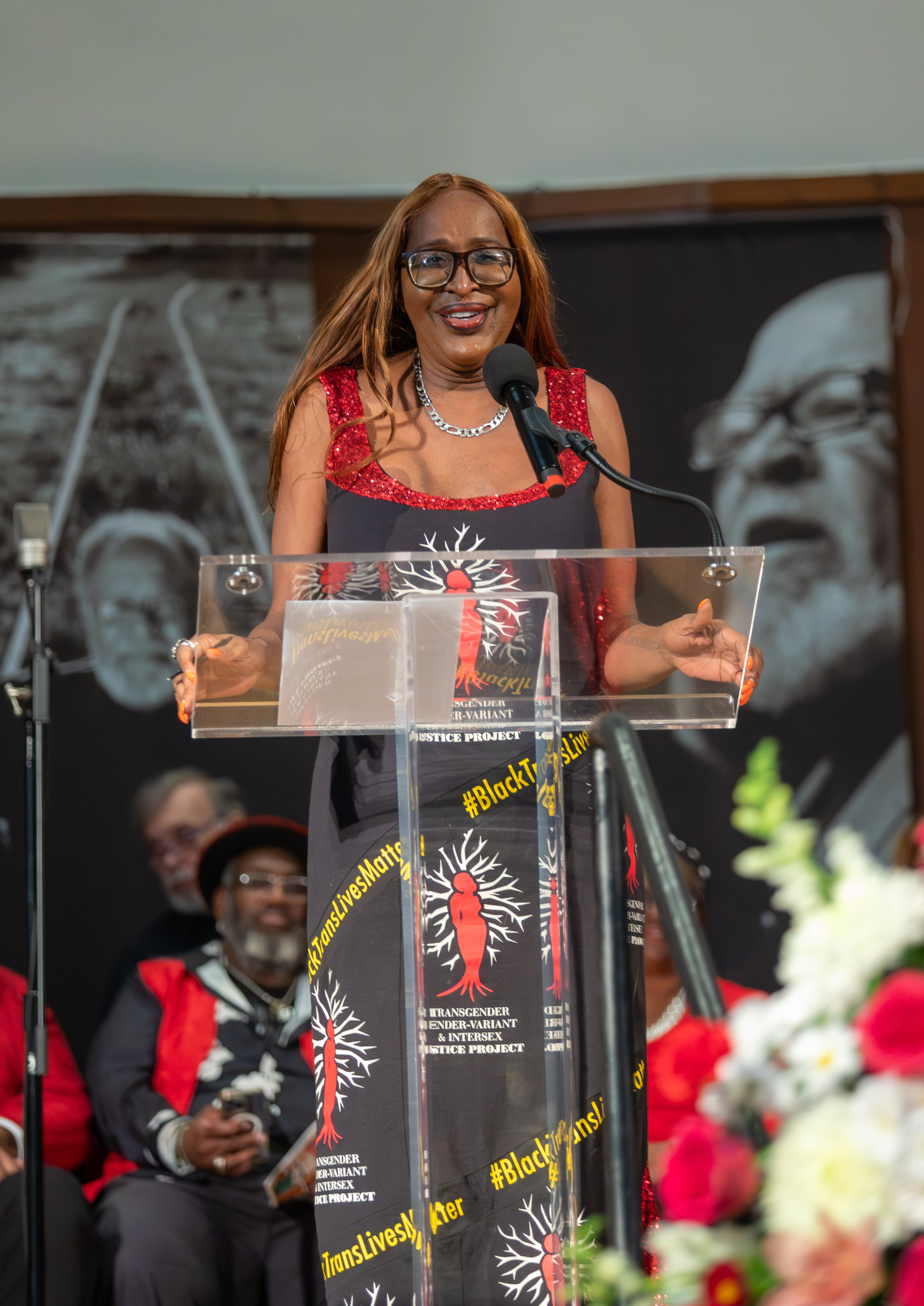
- Executive director Janetta Johnson speaking at a memorial for Miss Major Griffin-Gracy at Glide Memorial Church, December 2025.
- Founded: 2004
- Purpose: Transgender rights Prisoners' rights
- Region served: California, United States
- Method: Advocacy, community organizing, mutual aid
- Website: tgijp.org

The Miss Major Alexander L. Lee TGIJP Black Trans Cultural Center, also known as the Transgender Gender-Variant & Intersex Justice Project (TGI Justice Project or TGIJP), is a San Francisco-based nonprofit organization working to end human rights abuses against transgender, intersex, and gender-variant people, particularly trans women of color in California prisons and detention centers. Originally led by Black trans activist Miss Major Griffin-Gracy and Asian-American trans man and activist Alexander L. Lee (also the organization's founder), the current executive director of TGIJP is Janetta Johnson, a Black trans woman who was formerly incarcerated in a men's prison.

== Overview ==
TGIJP operates several outreach initiatives aimed at reducing isolation and monitoring conditions for transgender individuals housed inside state correctional facilities. Established in 2004, the organization's outreach infrastructure relies on direct communication links between community members inside and outside of the prison system.

== Newsletter ==
The organization publishes Stiletto, a magazine written for and by incarcerated transgender women, gender-nonconforming individuals, and intersex people. Melenie Eleneke served as the publication's editor beginning in 2008, managing content designed to share legal updates, narrative stories, poetry, and resource referrals across state and national institutions. The text functions as a tool for political education and legal strategy, gathering feedback from members regarding how policy changes, such as name and gender marker legislation, manifest within individual facilities.

== Outreach ==
TGIJP coordinates regular volunteer mail correspondence initiatives to answer letters submitted by incarcerated individuals, using feedback from readers to inform its structural legal and policy agendas. Alongside mail distribution, the organization runs a dedicated visitation program to monitor the safety and living conditions of incarcerated trans people. Early tracking and visitation efforts included routine travel to state institutions, including the California Medical Facility in Vacaville, to conduct welfare checks and coordinate localized support networks.

For individuals returning from facilities, the organization historically hosted reintegration circles and spiritual healing workshops. These re-entry frameworks were formalized in 2015 through the establishment of the Melenie Eleneke Grassroots Re-Entry Program, which provides employment training and paid direct-service fellowships to formerly incarcerated community members.

== International advocacy ==
Advocacy expanded to international policy platforms in February 2008, when Eleneke and co-founder Miss Major Griffin-Gracy delivered testimony before the United Nations Committee on the Elimination of Racial Discrimination in Geneva, Switzerland, addressing housing insecurity and economic discrimination impacting transgender women of color in the United States.

In 2016, TGIJP joined Black Lives Matter in withdrawing from the San Francisco Pride Parade, in protest of increased police presence at the event.

== See also ==
- LGBT people in prison
- Transgender Law Center
