= The Transgender District =

Transgender cultural zone in San Francisco

Coordinates: 37.7826°N 122.4110°W

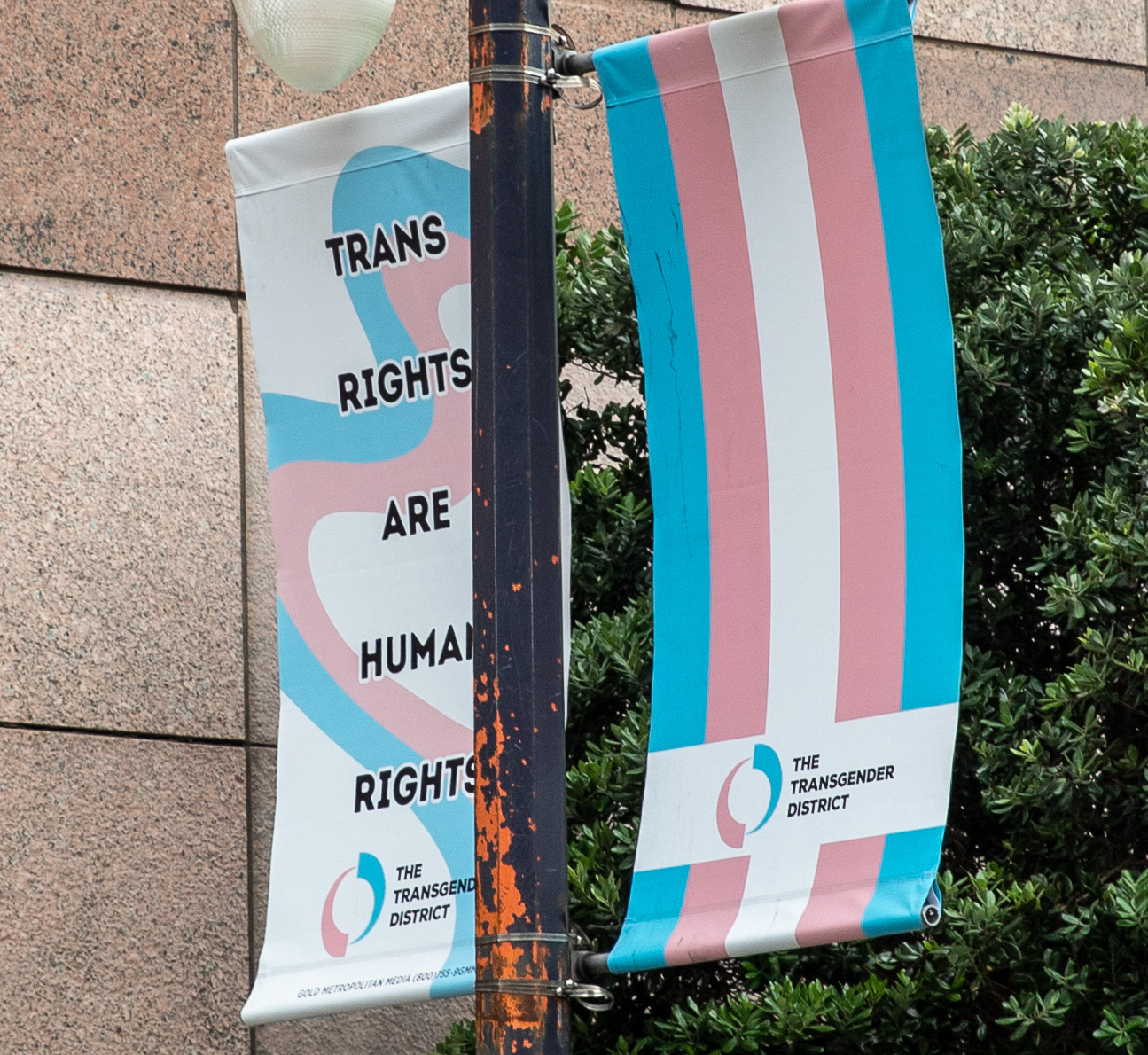
Transgender District lightpole banners with trans flag colors and text "Trans Rights Are Human Rights".

The Transgender District, formerly known as Compton's Transgender Cultural District, is the first legally recognized transgender district in the world. Named after the first documented uprising of transgender and queer people in United States history, the Compton's Cafeteria riot of 1966, the district encompasses six blocks in the southeastern Tenderloin, San Francisco, and crosses over Market Street to include two blocks of Sixth Street. It was co-founded by Honey Mahogany, Janetta Johnson, and Aria Sa'id.

== Leadership ==
Honey Mahogany served as the first executive director of The Transgender District, followed by Aria Sa'id. In August 2023, Breonna McCree and Carlo Gomez Arteaga took over as co-executive directors.

== History ==
The cultural district was established via ordinance by the San Francisco Board of Supervisors in 2017. In July 2019, the board allocated $300,000 in seed money to support the district. District projects planned for 2020 include a coffee shop that will provide job training for local trans people of color.

In March 2020, the district announced a name change to simply The Transgender District. Executive director Aria Sa'id explained that they did not wish to "continue honoring [Gene Compton] and his restaurant", as "he was a huge reason behind having drag queens, queer, and trans folks arrested".

In April 2022, the San Francisco Redistricting Task Force adopted a new district map that moved most of the Transgender District from District 6 to District 5, angering some community members.

In May 2022, the district announced that they would be pulling out of Pride events sponsored by the City and County of San Francisco. This decision was in response to Mayor London Breed pulling out of the 2022 Pride parade, in protest of San Francisco Pride's decision to prohibit police officers from marching in uniform. At the city's Pride flag raising and press conference on June 2, Mayor Breed announced that Pride had reached a compromise with the police, and she would once again march in the parade. Transgender District director Aria Sa'id attended the flag raising after learning of the new agreement.

In June 2022, the Board of Supervisors voted unanimously to designate the intersection of Turk and Taylor streets in the district as a historic landmark.

In late 2022 and early 2023, a graffiti writer by the name of "Snookie" tagged the poles on the district to bring attention to the fact that the site of the Compton's Cafeteria riots is now a halfway house managed by GEO Group, a private prison corporation.

As of 2025, a working group known as the TurkxTaylor initiative is calling "to collaboratively envision a speculative design proposal that decarcerates the Turk and Taylor historic building and its vacant storefront to resurface its legacy of resistance."

In May 2025, the San Francisco Board of Appeals agreed to hear a zoning appeal filed by a member of the TurkxTaylor initiative of the appropriateness of the halfway house at the historical site.
