= Aria Sa'id =

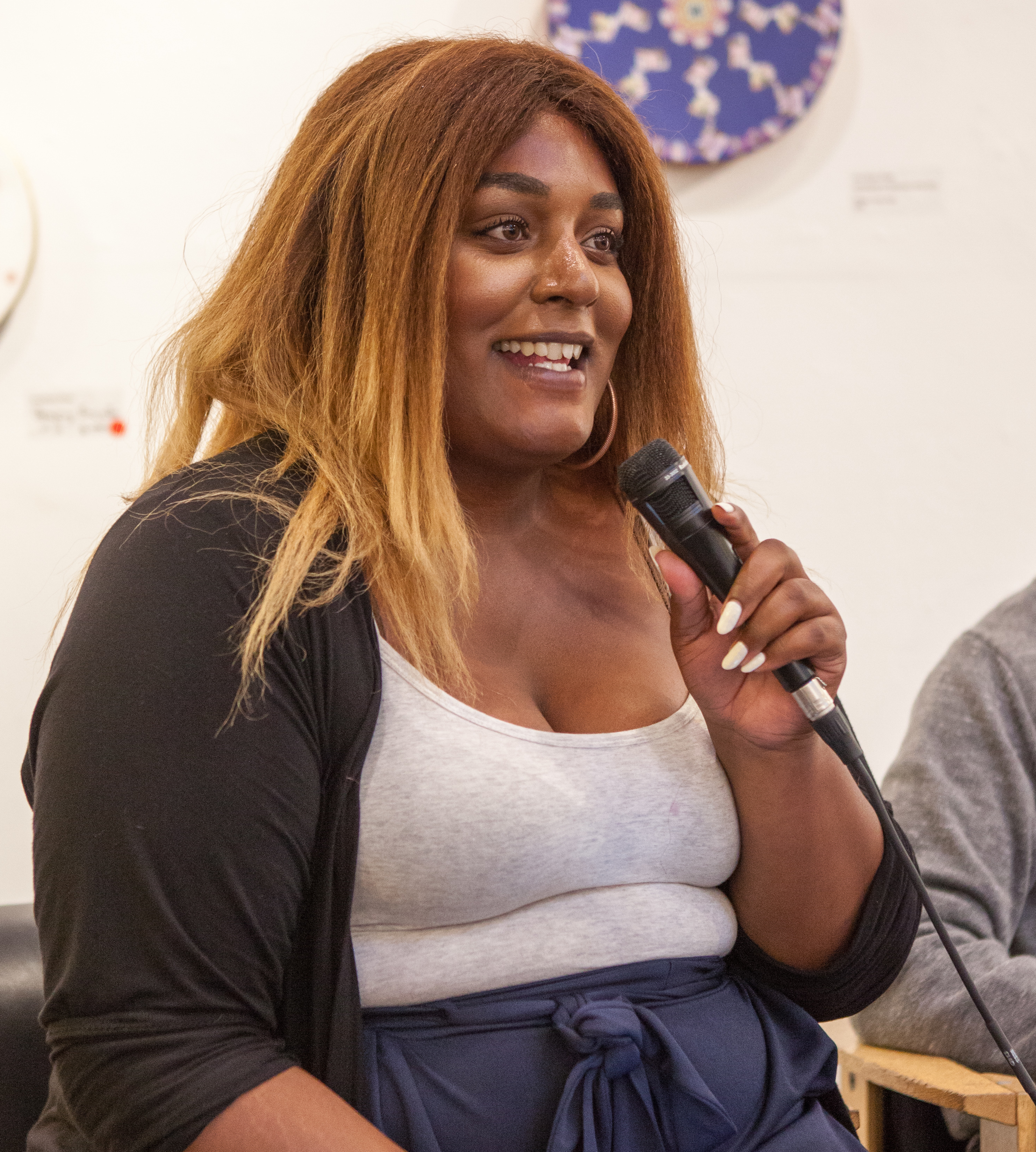
- Sa'id in 2017
- Born: 1989 or 1990 (age 35–36); Portland, Oregon, U.S.
- Occupations: Transgender advocate Political strategist
- Website: ariasaid.com

Aria Sa'id (born 1989/1990) is an American transgender advocate and political strategist based in Houston.

Sa'id is a co-founder (along with Janetta Johnson and Honey Mahogany) and former executive director of The Transgender District in San Francisco, and founder and director of the Kween Culture Initiative. She has also worked at the Trans:Thrive resource center, as program manager for St. James Infirmary, and as policy advisor for the San Francisco Human Rights Commission. In 2018, she was awarded the 10 Years of Service Award by San Francisco Pride.

In April 2023, Sa'id announced that she would be stepping down as head of The Transgender District. In August 2023, Breonna McCree and Carlo Gomez Arteaga took over as co-executive directors of the district.

After leaving her post at The Transgender District, Sa'id moved to Houston, where she leads the consulting firm Aria Sa'id & Associates.

== See also ==
- List of LGBT people from Portland, Oregon
