= Joe Wong (American football) =

American football player and coach (born 1976)

No. 71, 77
- Position: Guard / Tackle

Personal information
- Born: February 24, 1976 (age 50); Waimanalo, Hawaii, U.S.
- Listed height: 6 ft 6 in (1.98 m)
- Listed weight: 315 lb (143 kg)

Career information
- High school: Kailua (Kailua, Hawaii)
- College: Hawaii; Brigham Young
- NFL draft: 1999: 7th round, 244th overall pick

Career history

Playing
- Miami Dolphins (1999); Philadelphia Eagles (2001)*; Amsterdam Admirals (2001); Barcelona Dragons (2002); Oakland Raiders (2002–2004)
- * Offseason or practice squad member only

Coaching
- Kailua HS (HI) (2014–present)

Career NFL statistics
- Games played: 2
- Games started: 0
- Fumble recoveries: 0
- Stats at Pro Football Reference

Joseph Hau'oli L. Wong (born February 24, 1976) is an American former professional football player who was an offensive lineman in the National Football League (NFL). He played college football for the BYU Cougars after transferring from the Hawaii Rainbow Warriors. Wong was selected by the Miami Dolphins in the seventh round of the 1999 NFL draft with the 244th overall pick.

Wong was also a member of the Philadelphia Eagles and Oakland Raiders.

After his playing career, he became a head coach at his alma mater, Kailua High School, leading them to the 2019 OAI Division I title. His son, Elias, plays football at Hawaii.

His father is Hawaiian and his mother is Portuguese.
