= Janetta Johnson =

American transgender rights activist (born 1964/1965)

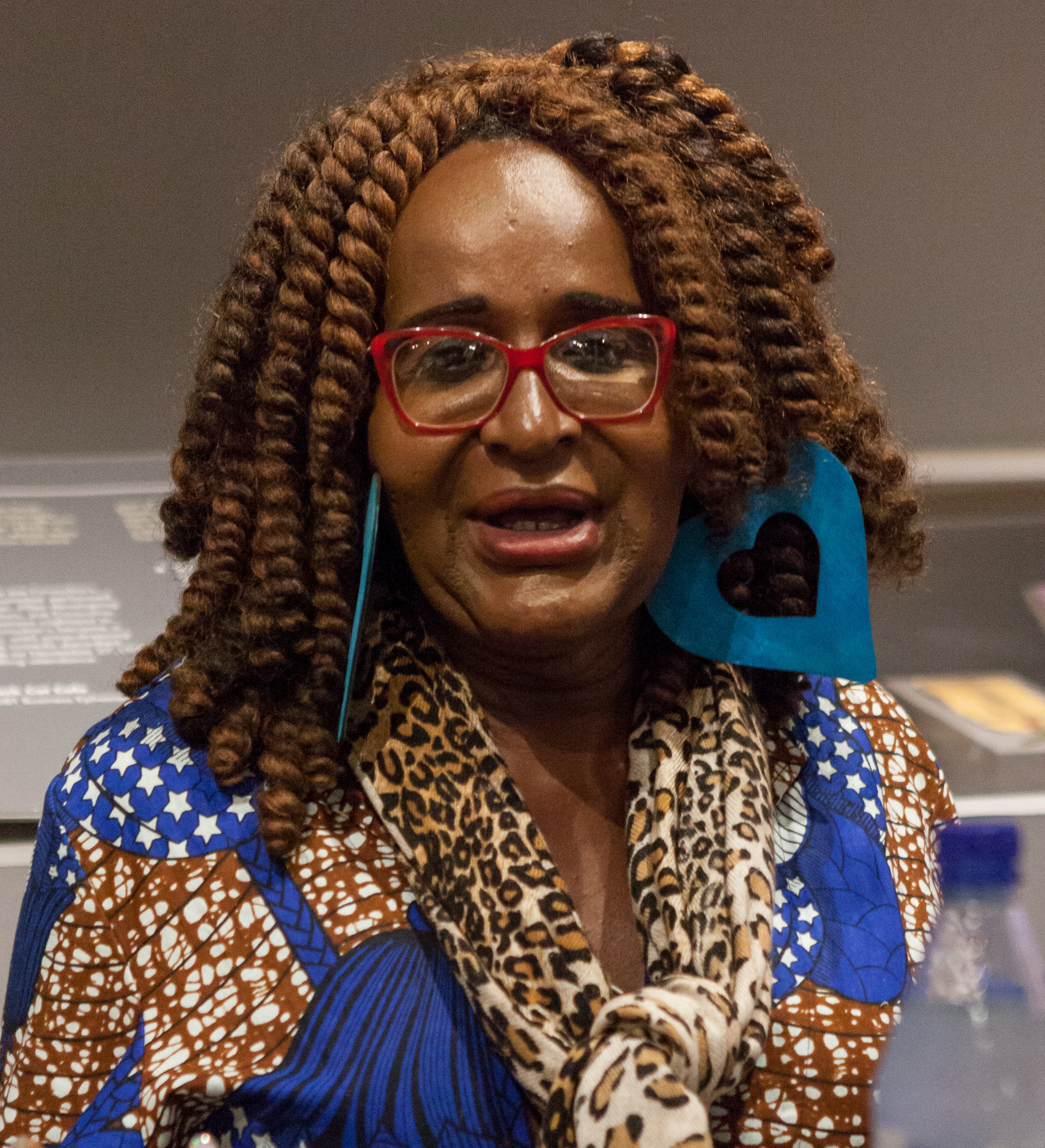
- Born: 1964 or 1965 (age 61–62); Tampa Bay, Florida, U.S.
- Occupations: Transgender and human rights activist
- Years active: 1997–present
- Organization: TGI Justice Project

Janetta Louise Johnson (born 1964/1965) is an American transgender rights activist, human rights activist, and prison abolitionist. She is the CEO of the TGI Justice Project. She co-founded the non-profit TAJA's Coalition in 2015. Along with Honey Mahogany and Aria Sa'id, Johnson is a co-founder of The Transgender District, established in 2017. Johnson's work is primarily concerned about the rights and safety of incarcerated and formerly-incarcerated transgender and gender-non-conforming people. She believes that the abolition of police and the prison–industrial complex will help support the safety of transgender people, and she identifies as an abolitionist.

== Early life ==
From when she was seventeen or eighteen years old, Janetta Johnson knew that she was a transgender woman and that she wanted to medically transition. She came out as a transgender woman in the 1980s.

In 1997, Johnson moved from her hometown, Tampa, Florida, to San Francisco in order to be mentored by Miss Major Griffin-Gracy, a transgender rights activist, prison abolitionist, and former director of the TGI Justice Project. Johnson describes Miss Major as her "adopted trans mother" because Miss Major extensively mentored and supported her. When she initially came to San Francisco, Johnson faced houselessness and stayed in a shelter, but she still closely worked under Miss Major's leadership. For the first three years after moving to San Francisco, Miss Major Griffin-Gracy taught Johnson about politics and community organizing, and Johnson described this experience as "life-changing." She said that living in San Francisco was the first time she saw transgender women "living their lives authentically," which was another reason she decided to move to San Francisco.

During the Great Recession, Johnson began selling drugs to survive, and she also engaged in sex work. Due to drug charges, she was sentenced to six years in men's federal prison but ultimately was incarcerated for three-and-a-half years. During her time, she was denied transgender health care and subjected to transphobia, misgendering, and sexual, physical, and verbal abuse. She became involved in a nine-month, early release program while incarcerated, which shortened her sentence, and she was released on May 21, 2012.

While Johnson was incarcerated, she started fighting for the rights of incarcerated trans people and shifted her activism to mainly working around issues around the incarceration of trans people. After Johnson was released from prison in 2012, she continued and escalated her involvement in transgender rights activism for incarcerated transgender women and gender-non-conforming individuals. In 2015, Miss Major Griffin-Gracy retired from the TGI Justice Project and Janetta Johnson was hired as the new Executive Director.

== Beliefs ==
=== Abolition ===
Johnson identifies as an abolitionist in a variety of ways, namely in terms of police and prisons. Janetta Johnson wants to abolish police — namely the San Francisco Police — and re-invest that money into housing, higher education, and healthcare for the community. As a formerly incarcerated woman herself, Johnson is also against systems of mass incarceration and wants to abolish prisons. Rather than using the prison industrial complex to respond to crime, she advocates for the use of restorative justice. She is especially insistent on the abolition of San Francisco systems of incarceration, and she is quoted at a 2018 rally calling for the closure of San Francisco's jail at the Hall of Justice saying, "San Francisco talks about being creative and innovative and a leader in all these things well, [closing jails] is one of the most important and amazing things that we can do. We need alternatives to jails and prisons."

Through bills and policy, Johnson says she is working to ideally reduce the prison industrial complex by 65%.

=== Economic justice ===
Johnson believes in obtaining economic justice for transgender and gender-non-conforming individuals. She believes that in order to do this, “[transgender people] have to have [their] own businesses, [they] have to have [their] own homes.” One of the ways she is working toward economic justice for trans people is through establishing The Transgender District, as one of its goals is to "economically empower the transgender community through ownership of homes, businesses, historic and cultural sites, and safe community spaces," and it has an Economics and Workforce Development Initiative that helps transgender people find employment opportunities. She also works toward economic justice by hiring formerly incarcerated trans and gender variant people at the TGI Justice Project so that they obtain work experience and have an income.

== Activism ==
=== TGI Justice Project ===
==== Overview ====
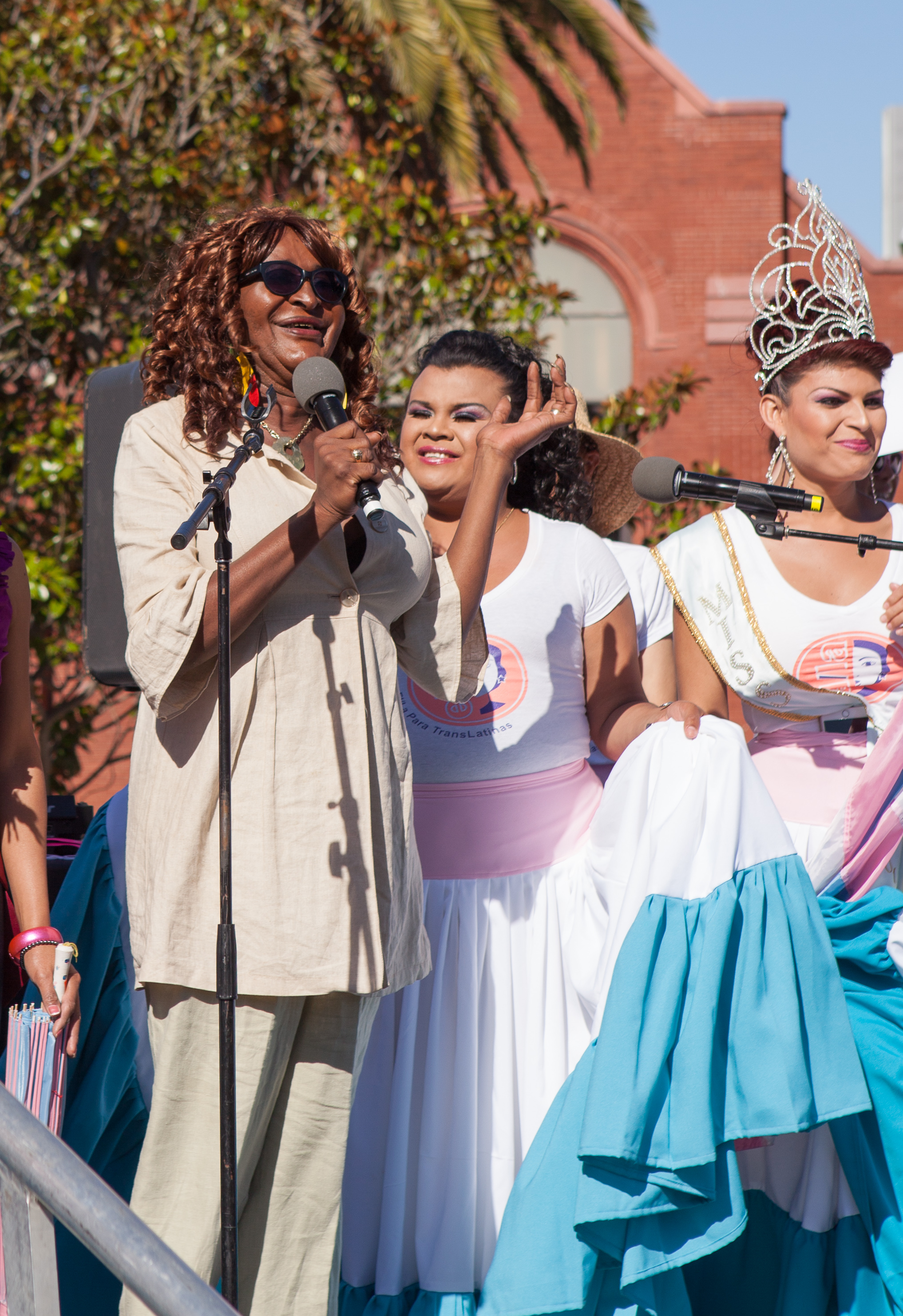
Johnson, accompanied by members of El/La Para TransLatinas, speaks on stage at the San Francisco Trans March in June 2016.

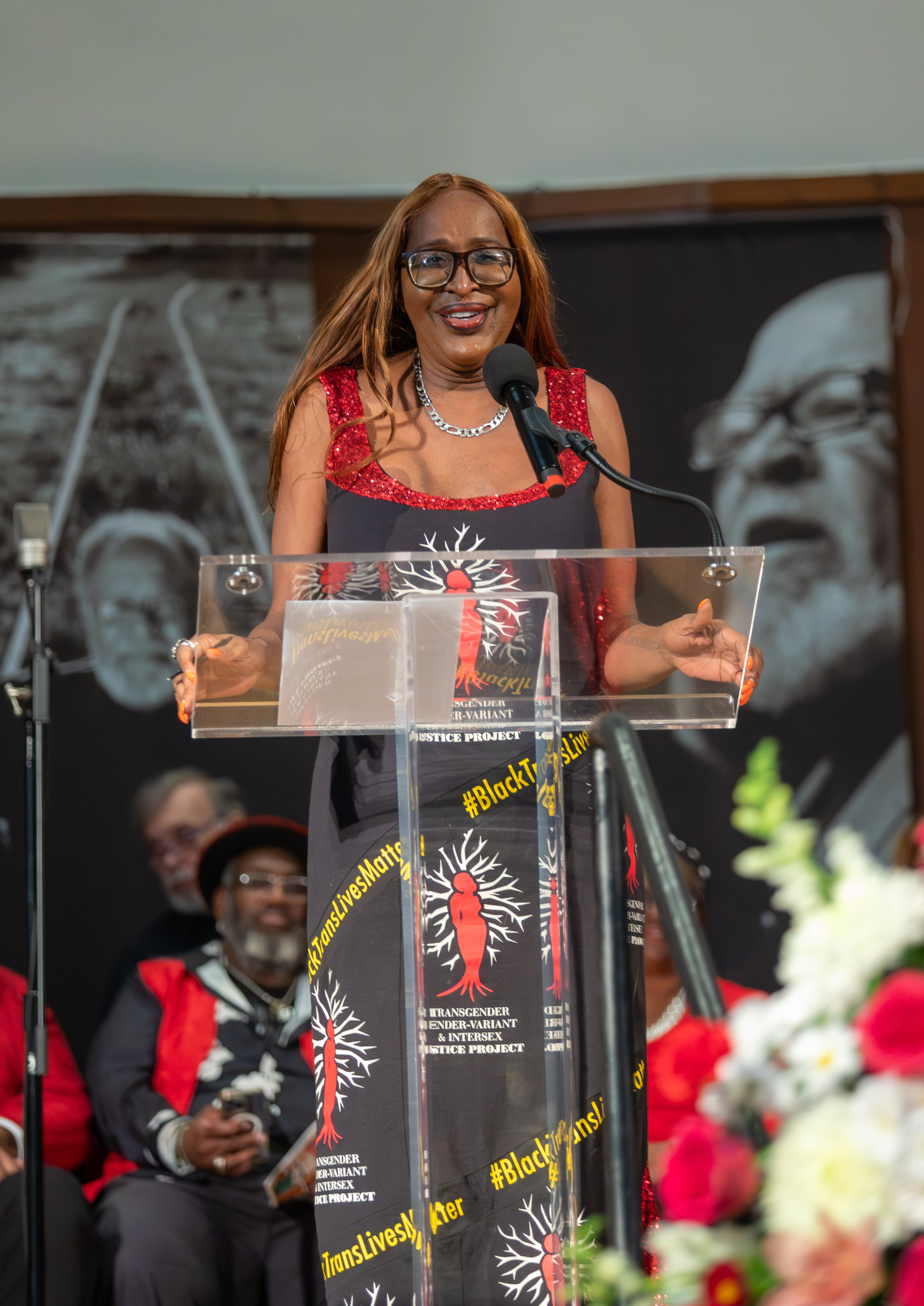
Wearing a dress featuring the TGIJP logo and #BlackTransLivesMatter hashtag, Johnson speaks at a memorial for Miss Major Griffin-Gracy at Glide Memorial Church, December 2025.

Founded in 2004, the Transgender, Gender-Variant & Intersex Justice Project or TGI Justice Project was initially established to provide legal services to incarcerated or formerly-incarcerated transgender and gender-variant individuals. Contemporarily, the non-profit describes itself as "a group of transgender, gender variant and intersex people–inside and outside of prisons, jails and detention centers–creating a united family in the struggle for survival and freedom.” They focus on many facets of transgender issues, such as law and policy, human rights, imprisonment, police violence, racism, poverty, and societal pressures and stigma. The organization follows prison/police abolitionist beliefs and is working to abolish prisons and police. They also work to support Black trans leadership by putting Black trans people in leadership roles at the organization, helping community members with re-entry into society from incarceration, and supporting transgender and gender-non-conforming individuals with navigating law and legal policy. The TGI Justice Project is one of the first and only organizations to be led by formerly incarcerated trans women of color. Miss Major Griffin-Gracy was the Executive Director from 2005 to 2015.

While incarcerated from 2009 to 2012, Johnson served as the Referral Liaison to the TGI Justice Project. Miss Major remained in regular communication with Johnson while incarcerated and told her that once she was released from prison, she wanted Johnson to be the next Executive Director of the TGI Justice Project. In 2015, Miss Major retired and Johnson became the Executive Director of TGI Justice. Because the TGI Justice Project does not have enough funds to hire more employees, Johnson, as Executive Director, does the majority of the work at the non-profit.

During her time employed at the TGI Justice Project, Johnson created the program Black Girlz Rulez, which is a national Black trans convening that cultivates community and uses intersectionality to approach issues that affect Black trans women.

==== Re-entry program ====
Johnson initiated TGI Justice Project's re-entry program that helps transgender and gender-variant people re-enter society immediately after being released from prison in order to prevent recidivism. While being incarcerated herself, she met many transgender women who said they had been incarcerated several times due to a lack of support during their re-entry to society. Johnson was inspired to create the re-entry program. Johnson is quoted saying, "[After I was incarcerated] I decided, I’m going to create a program so that Black trans women don’t fall through the cracks.” Now Johnson runs the re-entry program in order to prevent Black trans women from "fall[ing] through the cracks."

The TGI Justice Project's re-entry program aims to support transgender and gender-variant people re-enter society from incarceration through providing housing, food, money, and access to mental and physical health care services for sixty to ninety days after their release date. Johnson works with community members to arrange picking up recently released people from their former incarceration facilities and bringing them to temporary housing in hotels or motels. The program also pays current members a salary of at least $25 an hour to financially support their re-entry to society, as Johnson claims that "Reentry must come with a paycheck." Johnson notes that finding housing for the re-entry program and for trans people in general has become more difficult during the COVID-19 pandemic.

==== COVID-19 impact ====
Johnson noted that the COVID-19 pandemic has posed unique challenges for transgender people, saying "any type of disease or stigma is always attached to trans people." Because of this, Janetta Johnson has had TGI Justice Project put a greater focus on crisis case management and general community care for transgender people during the COVID-19 pandemic. One of the major ways she does this is through housing support, which has become an even more prominent issue during the pandemic. Johnson claims that seeing houseless people setting up encampments near her residence has inspired her to have empathy and create housing initiatives. During the pandemic, Johnson says she has spent many days finding hotels that will rent rooms to transgender people, as many will refuse to rent them or increase the price of rental once they learn that the prospective occupier is transgender. As of June 2020, the organization housed thirty trans and gender-non-conforming individuals. The TGI Justice Project also has volunteers bring meals and groceries to the people that they house in hotels and food and hygiene products to houseless trans people living on the streets.

Johnson noted that there was an increase in donations to the TGI Justice Project after the uprising about the murder of George Floyd that occurred during the COVID-19 pandemic.

=== TAJA's Coalition ===
Janetta Johnson co-founded the non-profit TAJA's Coalition in February 2015. The organization was formed in response to the murder of Taja Gabrielle de Jesus, a trans woman of color who resided in San Francisco. TAJA's Coalition aims to create safety for trans women and gender-non-conforming individuals through increasing their access to education and housing.

=== The Transgender District ===
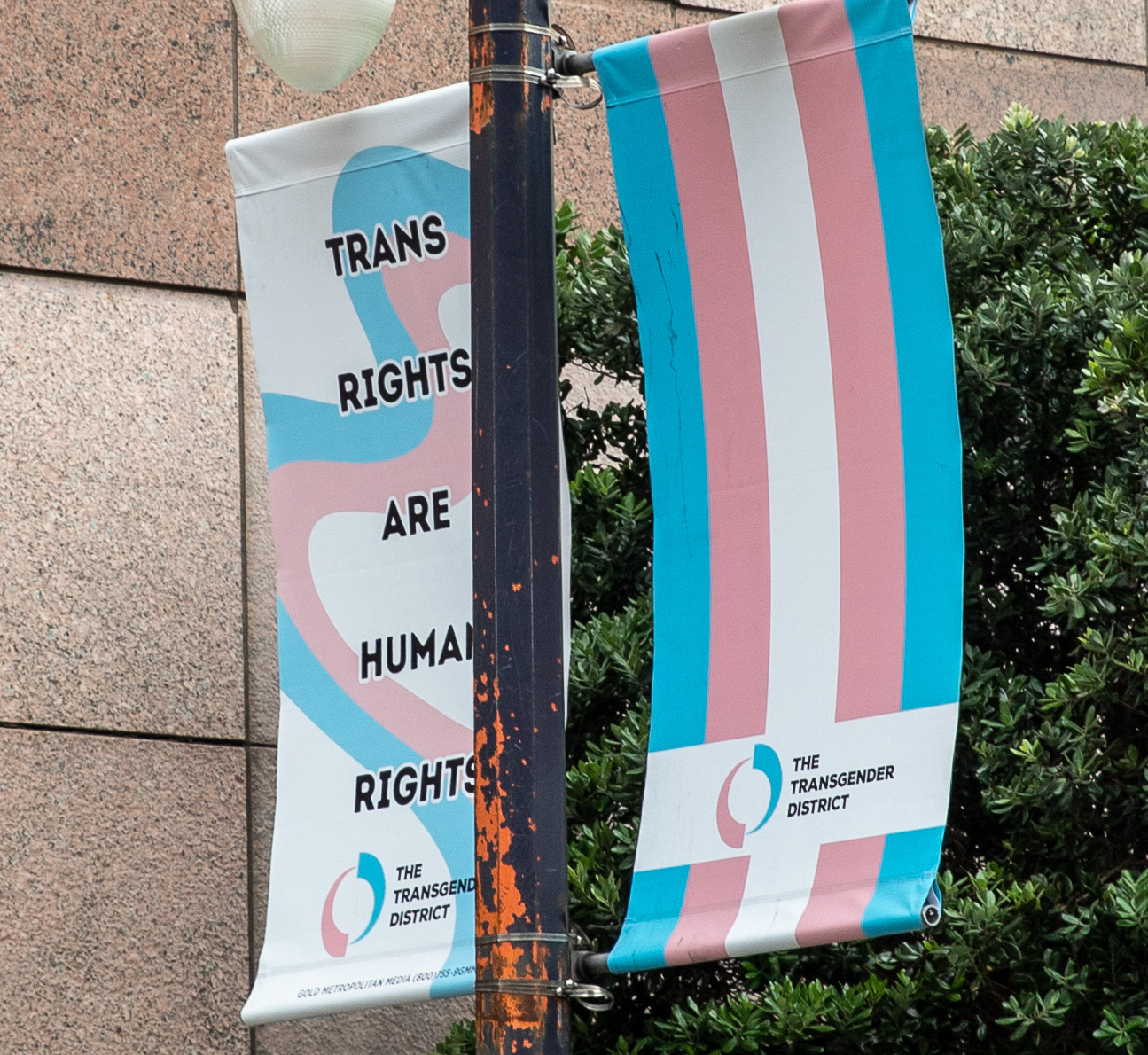
Transgender District lightpole banners with trans flag colors and text "Trans Rights Are Human Rights".

In 2017, Janetta Johnson co-founded the world's first legally recognized transgender cultural district, The Transgender District, in the Tenderloin of San Francisco with Honey Mahogany and Aria Sa'id, two other Black trans women. The District encompasses six blocks in the southeastern Tenderloin, San Francisco, and crosses over Market Street to include two blocks of Sixth Street. It contains several historically significant sites, such as the former location of Compton's Cafeteria and the Compton's Cafeteria Riot at the corner of Turk Street and Taylor Street. Turk Street and Taylor Street have been renamed by the District as “Compton’s Cafeteria Way” and “Vikki Mar Lane” respectively.

Johnson and the other founders of the district were inspired to create The Transgender District after a real-estate development company named Group i announced plans to erect a new residential building and hotel in the eastern part of the Tenderloin, gentrifying the area. Brian Basinger, the Executive Director of Q Foundation, a non-profit that centers around houseless people living with HIV/AIDS in the Tenderloin, filed a declaration against Group i's plans. Basinger gathered support from the St. James Infirmary, a health clinic for people who do sex work, where Aria Sa'id served as Program Director. They accumulated more support from other community members and organizations, such as Janetta Johnson with the TGI Justice Project. Basinger's initial declaration wasn't successful, and Group i still wanted to go through with their development plans, but Group i actually ended up providing financial support so that they could establish The Transgender District.

The District was originally named Compton's Transgender Cultural District after the historic August 1966 Compton's Cafeteria Riot, one of the first demonstrations of transgender resistance in the United States. The riot was a response to the police harassment of transgender and gender-non-conforming individuals, particularly transgender women. Cross-dressing was illegal at the time due to anti-masquerading laws, which was the basis for a lot of police brutality and harassment of transgender women. A trans woman interviewed in the documentary Screaming Queens: The Riot at Compton's Cafeteria could get arrested for having the buttons on the "wrong" side (i.e. the left side of the shirt, where buttons tend to be placed on women's clothing). Although the riot was undocumented in newspapers, the Compton's Cafeteria Riot was "rediscovered" and popularized by Susan Stryker in her 2015 film Screaming Queens: The Riot at Compton's Cafeteria, which ultimately led to the creation of The Transgender District.

The Transgender District's mission is "to create an urban environment that fosters the rich history, culture, legacy, and empowerment of transgender people and its deep roots in the southeastern Tenderloin neighborhood... and to stabilize and economically empower the transgender community through ownership of homes, businesses, historic and cultural sites, and safe community spaces." Johnson's primary hope for the District is to create a "safe space" for transgender people, and she is quoted saying "I believe in creating a space without violence, discrimination, and over-policing; and making sure Black trans women have opportunities for ownership and cultural spaces [where] they feel safe."

=== Legal and policy work ===
Janetta Johnson worked on the California legislative campaign to pass Senate Bill 310, commonly known as the Name and Dignity Act, which was co-sponsored by the TGI Justice Project and successfully passed in October 2017. It is a law that allows transgender people to petition the superior court to change their name and gender marker while incarcerated in California, which Johnson says makes re-entry into society easier. Johnson is quoted saying, “A person exiting prison with identification documents that actually match who they are [in terms of name and gender identity] has an exponential impact on their ability to access life-giving services without some of the discrimination that comes with having identification documents that don’t match their gender presentation.”

During the pandemic, Johnson and the TGI Justice Project have provided legal support to incarcerated persons inside two prisons local to the organization, Mule Creek State Prison and Kern Valley State Prison.

Johnson has also formerly been a member of the Transgender Law Center's national coalition.
