= Cameron Friel =

American football player

No. 7 – UNLV Rebels
- Position: Quarterback
- Class: Redshirt Senior

Personal information
- Born: Honolulu, Hawaii, U.S.
- Listed height: 6 ft 3 in (1.91 m)
- Listed weight: 230 lb (104 kg)

Career information
- High school: Kailua High School
- College: UNLV (2021–present)

Awards and highlights
- MW Freshman of the Year (2021)
- Stats at ESPN

Cameron Kamalani Friel is an American college football quarterback for the UNLV Rebels.

== Early life ==
Born in Honolulu, Hawaii, Friel attended Kailua High School where he threw 22 touchdowns and over 1,700 yards. He was a three-star prospect and committed to UNLV, enrolling in January 2021.

== College career ==
Friel began his true freshman season as backup quarterback, but was named starter for week three against Iowa State, completing 7 of 12 passes for 55 yards and one interception in the 3–48 loss. He then started the following eight games before suffering a season-ending injury, finishing his first year of college football with 1,608 passing yards and six touchdowns, while completing 62.4 percent of his throws, which placed third all-time for any UNLV player. At the end of the year, Friel was named Mountain West Conference Freshman of the Year.

=== Statistics ===
Season	Team	Games			Passing								Rushing			
Season	Team	GP	GS	Record	Cmp	Att	Pct	Yds	Y/A	TD	Int	Rtg	Att	Yds	Avg	TD
2021	UNLV	9	8	2–6	141	226	62.4	1,608	7.1	6	11	121.2	46	−74	−1.6	0
2022	UNLV	4	2	0–2	33	49	67.3	364	7.4	3	1	145.9	12	−68	−5.7	0
2023	UNLV	1	0	—	Did not record pass attempt								1	1	1.0	1
2024	UNLV	5	0	—	5	6	83.3	64	10.7	0	0	172.9	8	29	3.6	2
2025	UNLV	3	0	—	0	2	0.0	0	0.0	0	0	0.0	7	29	4.1	0
Career		22	10	2–8	179	283	63.3	2,036	7.2	9	12	125.7	74	-83	-1.1	3
