= Kailua High School =

Location
- 451 Ulumanu Drive; Kailua, Hawaii 96734; United States; 21°23′08″N 157°44′52″W

Information
- Type: Public, Co-educational
- Motto: Ho'omakamaka a ho'okumu "Creating Friendships and Futures"
- Established: 1955
- School district: Windward District
- Principal: Kimberly Anthony-Maeda
- Teaching staff: 55.50 (FTE)
- Grades: 9-12
- Enrollment: 795 (2023-2024)
- Student to teacher ratio: 14.32
- Campus: Rural
- Colors: Blue and white
- Athletics: Oahu Interscholastic Association
- Mascot: Surfrider
- Rival: James B. Castle High School Kalaheo High School
- Accreditation: Western Association of Schools and Colleges
- Yearbook: He'e Nalu
- Air Force: United States Air Force JROTC
- Website: www.kailuahighschool.com

Kailua High School is a four-year public high school located in the Kailua CDP, City and County of Honolulu, Hawaii, United States on the island of O‘ahu. The school serves students grades 9 through 12.

As of the 2000 U.S. census the U.S. Census Bureau defined the school as being in the Maunawili CDP, but as of the 2010 U.S. census it was redefined as being in Kailua CDP.

== History ==
In 1955 Kailua opened on the current site of Kailua Intermediate School in the middle of Kailua Town. In 1962 Kailua moved to its present location 2 miles (3.2 km) away in the Pohakupu neighborhood.

Kailua High is one of four public high schools on the windward side of Oahu and serves the neighborhoods of Kailua, Waimanalo and Maunawili, approximately 50,000 residents.

== Athletics ==
Kailua High School also has an array of sports for its students. They compete in the Oahu Interscholastic Association.

== Notable alumni ==
Listed alphabetically by last name:

- Joey Cantillo, professional baseball player
- Doug Capilla, professional baseball player
- Campbell Cavasso, member of the Hawaii House of Representatives
- Sasha Colby, American drag performer and winner of season 15 of RuPaul's Drag Race
- Melenie Mahinamalamalama Eleneke, activist, hula dancer, healer
- Robert Fellmeth, law professor
- Russ Francis, professional American football player (San Francisco 49ers)
- Cameron Friel, college football quarterback
- Derek Ho, professional surfer, Pipeline Masters winner
- Michael Ho, professional surfer, Triple Crown winner
- Sandi A. Hohn, singer, Kumu Hula
- DJ Keoki, DJ
- Agnes Lum, model
- Denise Michele, model
- Ikaika Olds, member of the Hawaii House of Representatives
- Albert Pyun, film director
- Samson Satele, professional American football player
- Michael D. Wilson, associate justice of the Supreme Court of Hawaii
- Joe Wong, professional American football player
