= Matt Dorsey =

American politician

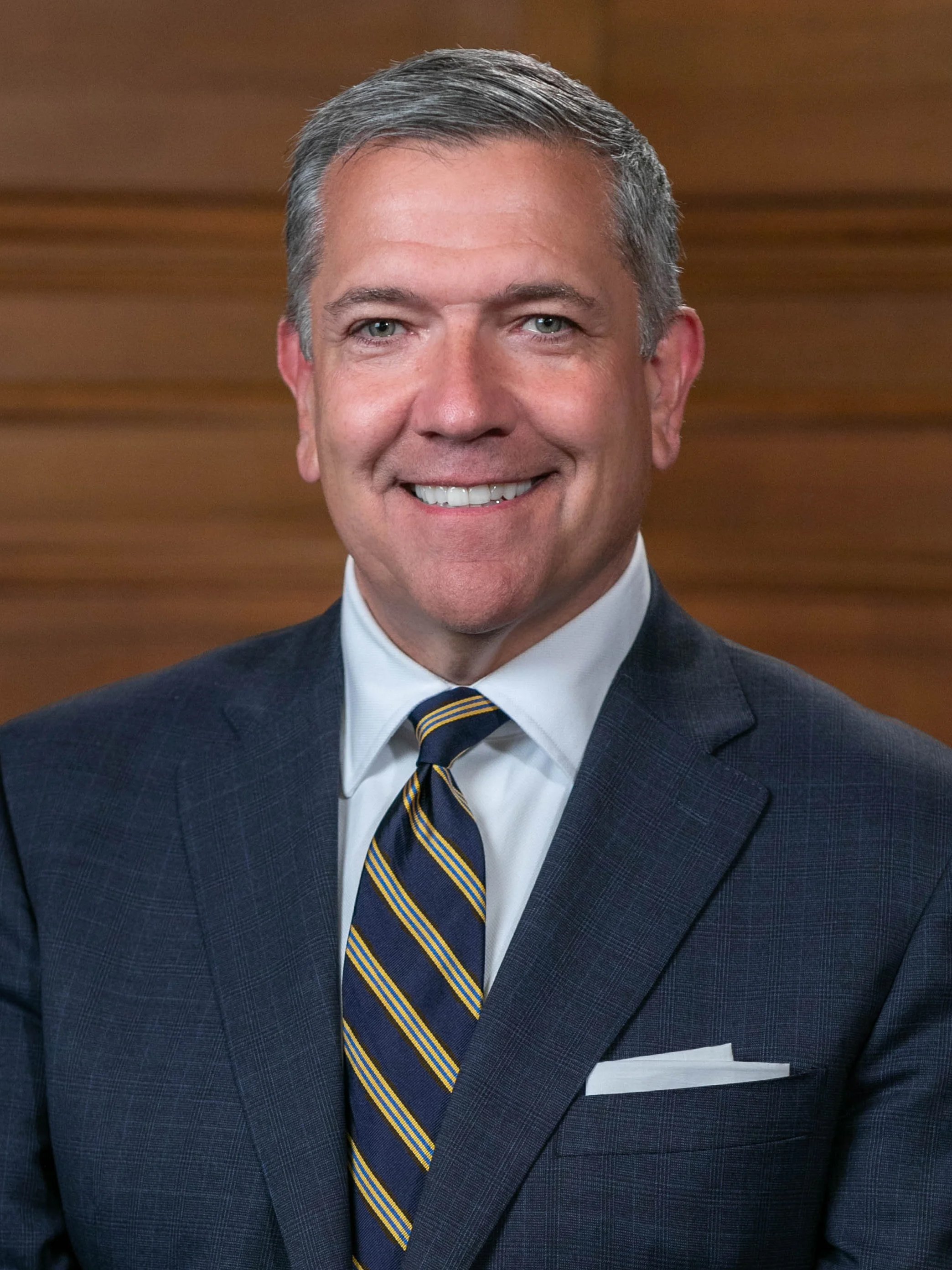
- Official portrait, 2022

Member of the San Francisco Board of Supervisors from the 6th district
- Incumbent
- Assumed office May 9, 2022
- Appointed by: London Breed
- Preceded by: Matt Haney

Personal details
- Born: 1964 or 1965 (age 61–62)
- Party: Democratic
- Spouse: Gerson Costa (m. 2025)
- Education: Emerson College (BS)
- Website: Campaign website Board website

Chinese name
- Traditional Chinese: 麥德誠
- Simplified Chinese: 麦德诚
Transcriptions
Standard Mandarin
- Hanyu Pinyin: mài dé chéng
Yue: Cantonese
- Jyutping: maak6 dak1 sing4

Matthew Dorsey (born 1964 or 1965) is an American politician and communications professional. Dorsey has served on the San Francisco Board of Supervisors representing District 6 since his appointment by Mayor London Breed on May 9, 2022. He was elected to a full term in the November 2022 election. He previously served as head of communications for the San Francisco Police Department.

== Career ==
Dorsey worked strategic communications for San Francisco City Attorney Dennis Herrera for 14 years. From 2020-2022, Dorsey worked for the San Francisco Police Department, where he served as Head of Strategic Communications. He defended the police department for its decision to withdraw from a Memorandum of Understanding (MOU) with the District Attorney's office, which assigned itself as lead investigator in police use-of-force incidents.

== San Francisco Board of Supervisors ==
On May 9, 2022, Mayor London Breed appointed Dorsey to the San Francisco Board of Supervisors to replace outgoing District 6 supervisor Matt Haney for the remaining few months of his term. Haney had resigned from the Board after being elected to fill a vacancy in the California State Assembly.

Dorsey ran for a full term in November 2022. He defeated Honey Mahogany, a former aide to Haney. Dorsey was supported by GrowSF, among many other moderate Democratic organizations. District 6 was redrawn in redistricting in 2022; it no longer includes the Tenderloin, which was moved to District 5. The new District 6 has 76,000 residents and consists of South of Market (SoMa), Rincon Hill, South Beach, Mission Bay, Mid-Market, The Hub (near Market and Octavia) and Showplace Square (southwestern SoMa).

=== Public safety ===
Dorsey and Mayor Breed decided not to march in San Francisco Pride in 2022 after the organizers banned police officers from marching in uniform. After Pride reached a compromise with the police, Dorsey and Breed agreed to march.

As a supervisor, Dorsey has faced criticism for his support of a documentary on San Francisco's police department, which he began promoting during his time working for the department. Critics viewed the documentary as a waste of limited police resources.

Dorsey criticized the city's harm reduction approach to drug use, calling for mass-arrests of drug users in the South of Market neighborhood and placing them in "compulsory detox and treatment" in 2025.

== Personal life ==
Dorsey is gay, HIV-positive and in recovery from drug and alcohol addiction. He is the second known person living with HIV to serve on the San Francisco Board of Supervisors. Dorsey is a parishioner and former parish council member at Most Holy Redeemer Catholic Church. He credits his Catholic faith in-part for his sobriety.

Dorsey married Gerson Costa in March 2025. The couple has two dogs, Georgia and Brando.
