= Lomilomi =

Lomilomi may refer to:

- Lomilomi massage, a Polynesian method of kneading massage
- Lomi-lomi salmon, a side dish in Hawaiian cuisine
