= Honey Mahogany =

American drag queen

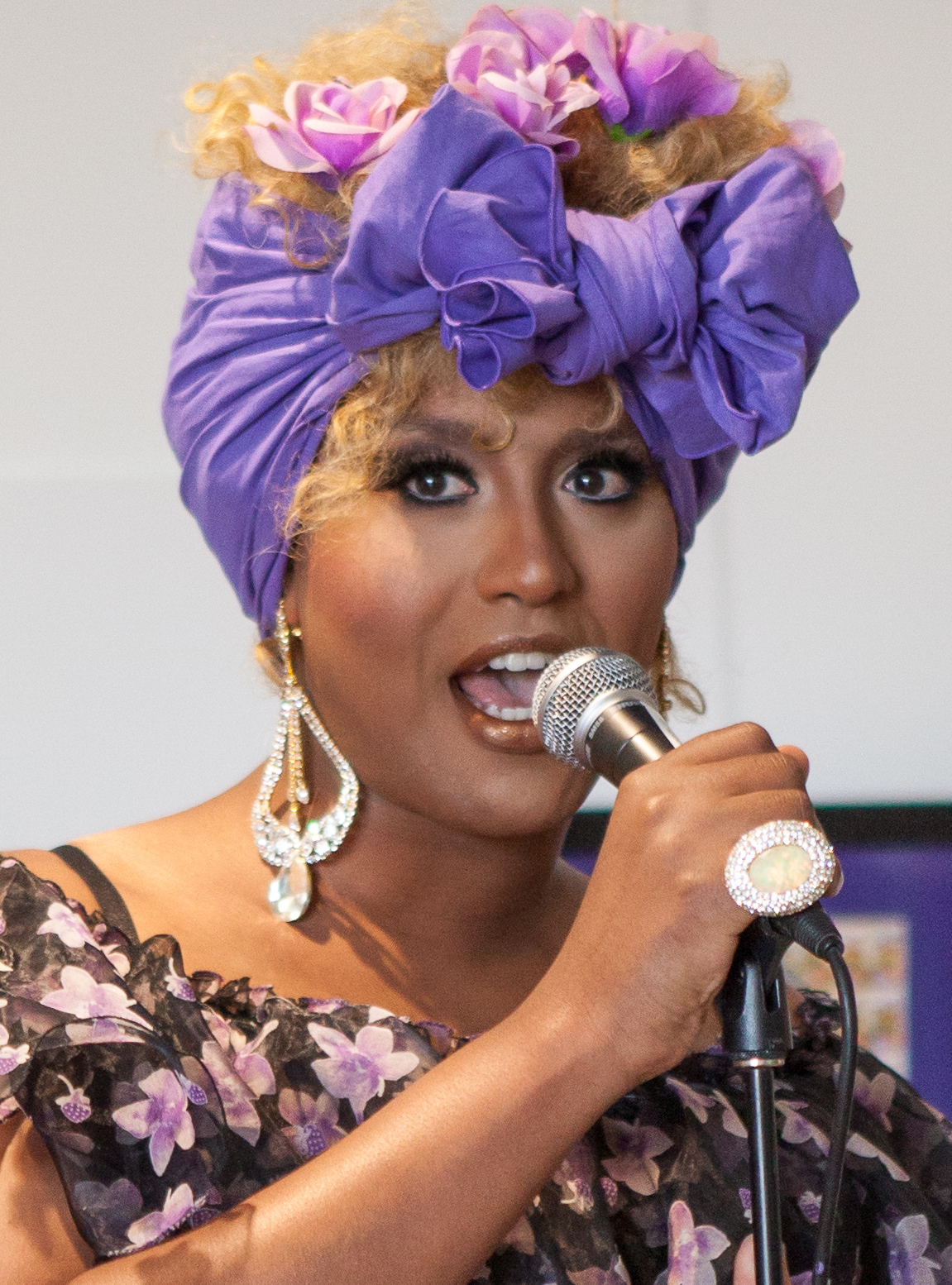
- Mahogany in 2017
- Born: December 30, 1983 (age 42); San Francisco, California, U.S.
- Education: University of Southern California (BA); University of California, Berkeley (MSW)
- Occupations: Drag performer, social worker, political activist
- Known for: Competing on season 5 of RuPaul's Drag Race
- Political party: Democratic

Honey Mahogany (born December 30, 1983) is an American activist, politician, drag performer, and singer. She first came to national attention on the fifth season of RuPaul's Drag Race, followed by releasing her debut EP Honey Love. She was instrumental in setting up The Transgender District in San Francisco, where she served as the first director. In 2024, Mahogany was appointed director of the San Francisco Office of Transgender Initiatives.

== Background ==
Mahogany first started performing in drag while earning her undergrad at University of Southern California. She went on to attend graduate school at the University of California, Berkeley, earning a Master of Social Work and co-founded the annual drag competition Berkeley's Next Top Drag Performer in 2008. While at UC Berkeley, she mostly performed at lesbian clubs in Oakland, stating that at the time she had "many more lesbian friends than gay friends." Mahogany ended up choosing Honey Mahogany based on the two colors of Revlon makeup that were closest to her skin tone.

== Career and RuPaul's Drag Race ==
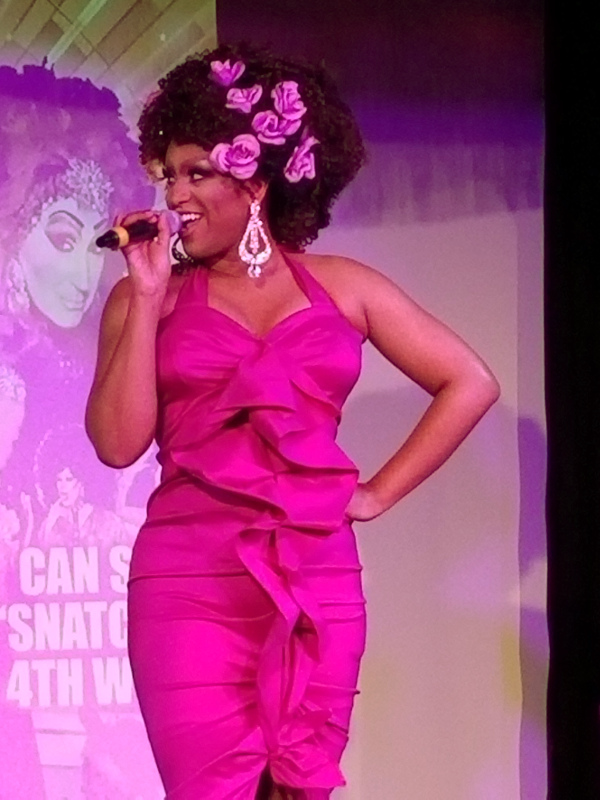
Honey Mahogany performing in 2018

Mahogany was one of fourteen contestants to be chosen for the fifth season of RuPaul's Drag Race, competing against Jinkx Monsoon, Alaska Thunderfuck 5000, Detox Icunt, Alyssa Edwards, among others. Mahogany was the first contestant on the show from San Francisco, and one of the few who sang live, as opposed to lip syncing.

In the opening episode of the season, RuPaullywood Or Bust, Mahogany's runway look was an all-gold outfit with a gold mesh headpiece. In week two for the episode Lip Synch Extravaganza Eleganza, Mahogany placed within the top four. In week three, Mahogany partnered with Coco Montrese for a puppet performance with which the judges were not impressed. Combining the runway and being judged individually for the puppet performance, Mahogany ended up being safe that week. In episode four, Black Swan: Why It Gotta Be Black?, Mahogany took to the runway in a caftan, which the judges were not impressed with. She was placed in the bottom two, lip syncing against Vivienne Pinay to Britney Spears' "Oops!... I Did It Again". After the performance, both Mahogany and Pinay were eliminated in a double elimination.

After Mahogany was eliminated, when asked to choose who she would like to win, she picked Seattle-based Jinkx Monsoon, who did end up taking the crown.

At the beginning of season 6 of Drag Race, Mahogany stated that she was "Team Courtney" for who should win, referring to Courtney Act. Mahogany and Act had met when both auditioned for The X Factor.

=== Music ===
In 2010, Mahogany released a cover of Adele’s “Hometown Glory”, which was recognized by Limelight Records as one of the Best Cover Songs of the Year.

In 2012, Mahogany released her second single, this time an original track titled “It's Honey”, which had an accompanying music video featuring fellow drag race alums Raja and Jujubee.

In February 2014, Mahogany released her debut EP Honey Love, which was written and co-produced with Erik Ian Walker of WakoWorld Music. One of the tracks on the EP was “Shoulda Known Better”, which Mahogany performed on the HBO show Looking in 2014. The EP features 3 original songs: “Mountain”, “Take Him From Me”, and “Shoulda Known Better”; and two covers: “Feeling Good” and Madonna's “Lucky Star”.

=== Theater and The Craft... of Drag! ===
Mahogany has also been involved in a number of theatrical productions, including Queer Rebels of the Harlem Renaissance, Dirty Little Showtunes, Oprah: The Dragsical (in which she held the title role), Halloween: The Ballad of Michelle Meyers, and the collaborative drag/performance art show Work MORE! Mahogany also joined trixxie carr for her show The Right to RULE in 2012 in the United Kingdom at the Abandon Normal Devices (AND) Festival.

In 2013, Mahogany joined Peaches Christ's The Craft... of Drag! The play was a satirical take on the 1996 film The Craft. The show featured Peaches Christ, Sharon Needles, Alaska Thunderfuck 5000, and Honey Mahogany. The show was held in San Francisco at the Castro Theatre and was sponsored by Midnight Mass, San Francisco Bay Guardian, Amoeba Records and Good Vibrations. Mahogany played Rochelle, part of the main foursome from the original film. The show was performed live as a 50-minute production.

Mahogany joined another Christ production later in 2013, the 16th Annual Showgirls performance, based on the 1995 film Showgirls. While in that production, Mahogany worked with Rena Riffel, who played Penny/Hope in the original movie. Mahogany played the character of Nomi.

In 2015 and 2017 Mahogany starred as Lieutenant Uhura in a live action drag version of Star Trek directed by fellow San Francisco queen D'Arcy Drollinger.

In 2016, Mahogany joined forces with Peaches Christ yet again for Spice Racks, a drag parody of the late 1990s camp film Spice World. Mahogany and Christ were joined by Drag Race alum Katya Zamolodchikova and UK queens Cheddar Gorgeous and Anna Phylactic.

Mahogany reprised her role as Scary Spice for a live reading of Spice World at Clusterfest in 2018.

== Politics ==
Mahogany became the first transgender person to serve on the San Francisco Democratic County Central Committee (DCCC) following her appointment in 2018. She was elected to a seat on the DCCC in 2020, becoming the first Black trans person to win an elected post in the state of California. In 2021, Mahogany was elected chair of the DCCC, becoming the first Black chair of the local party, and the first trans person in the country to chair a local Democratic Party.

In June 2022, Mahogany announced her campaign for District 6 Supervisor of San Francisco. She had previously served as chief of staff to District 6 Supervisor Matt Haney, who left the Board of Supervisors in April 2022 after being elected to the California State Assembly. In her role in Haney's office, she worked on moving unhoused residents into hotel rooms at the beginning of the pandemic, a ballot measure that creates a new Department of Sanitation and Streets, and a proposed Stevenson Street housing project that was ultimately not passed. On November 14, Mahogany conceded to incumbent Matt Dorsey.

== Other ventures ==
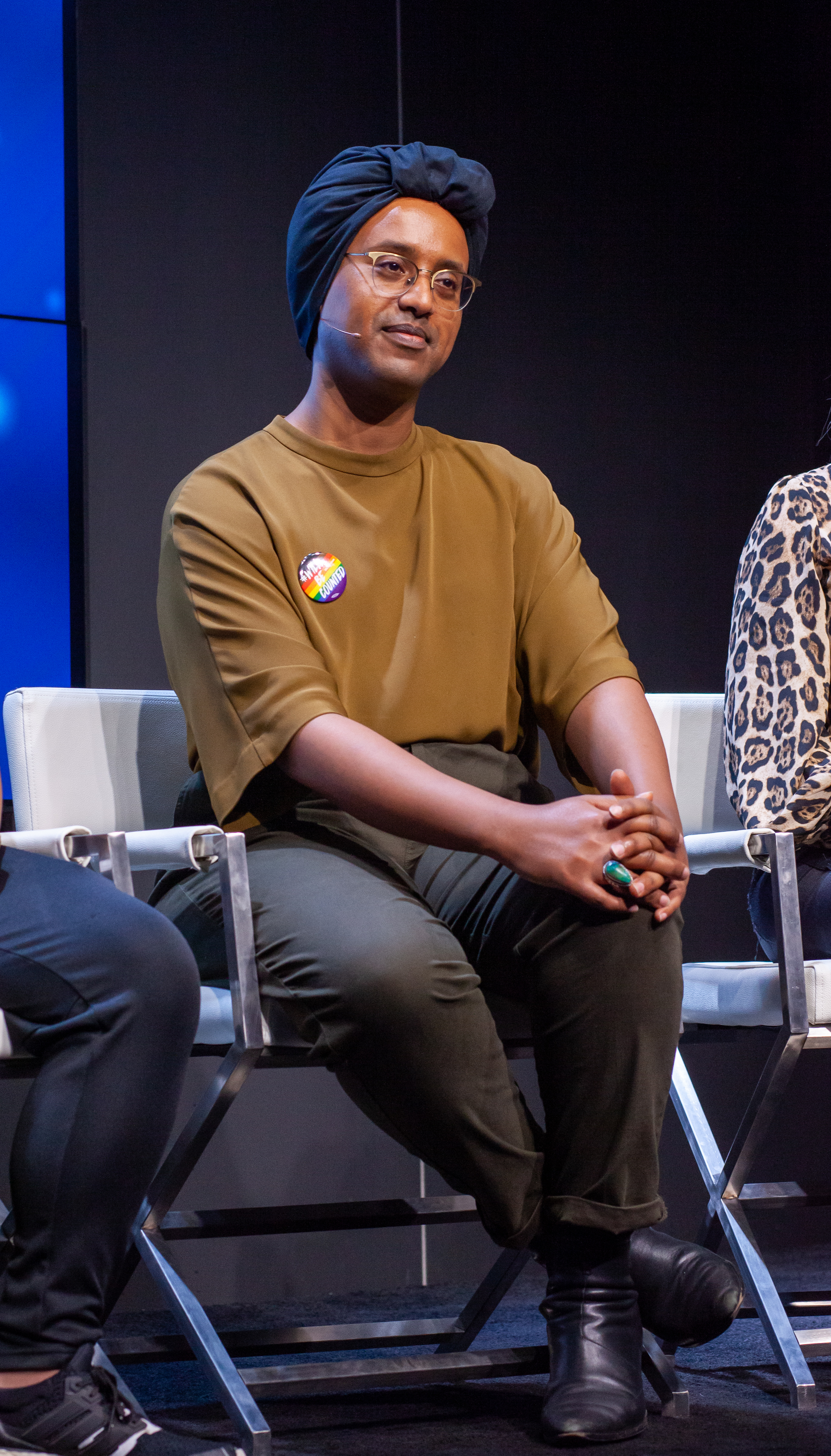
Mahogany participates in a panel discussion on the 2020 Census and the LGBTQ community at the Commonwealth Club of California, January 2020.

In 2011, Mahogany was voted Best Drag Queen by readers of San Francisco Weekly. In 2013 and 2014, Mahogany emceed Topsy Turvy: A Queer Circus Extravaganza, which has been described as a "geographically and culturally diverse cast of queer, trans*, and gender-variant circus performers us[ing] their bodies to tell unique stories that subvert traditional ideals of beauty, sexuality, and power." In 2014, Mahogany hosted San Francisco's annual Castro Street Fair.

In 2016, Mahogany became co-owner of The Stud bar. The previous owner announced that he was putting the business up for sale after the landlord made a substantial rent increase. Mahogany and 17 other long-time patrons of the bar joined forces to turn the bar into a cooperative, making The Stud one of the world's few cooperatively owned nightclubs.

For five years starting in December 2012, Mahogany headlined and emceed Mahogany Mondays, a drag and cabaret show held at Midnight Sun in The Castro. In 2017, Mahogany began hosting Black Fridays, a variety show featuring African American DJ's & talent held at San Francisco's oldest LGBT bar, The Stud. As of June 2017, Mahogany and her close friend Sister Roma have become the regular hosts for the Main Stage of San Francisco Pride.

Mahogany also co-founded The Transgender District in San Francisco with Janetta Johnson and Aria Sa'id. Mahogany served as the district's first director. In 2018, Mahogany became the first trans person to serve as co-president of the Harvey Milk LGBT Democratic Club.

In June 2019, to mark the 50th anniversary of the Stonewall Riots, sparking the start of the modern LGBTQ rights movement, Queerty named her one of the Pride50 “trailblazing individuals who actively ensure society remains moving towards equality, acceptance and dignity for all queer people".

In May 2024, Mahogany was appointed the new director of the San Francisco Office of Transgender Initiatives by Mayor London Breed.

== Personal life ==
Mahogany was born and raised in San Francisco, the child of Ethiopian immigrants who fled their home country due to political persecution and unrest. Raised Roman Catholic while living in a two-bedroom apartment with her parents, brother, grandmother, and various cousins, she attended Catholic school K-12 and is an alumna of St. Ignatius College Preparatory. She received a bachelor's degree in psychology from the University of Southern California with a minor in Musical Theater. Upon graduation, she interned at the Joint United Nations Programme on HIV/AIDS, and soon after applied and was admitted to the University of California at Berkeley, where she earned a master's degree in social work. Using that degree, she worked as a social worker in Contra Costa County for several years. Some of the clients that she worked with included people with HIV and homeless LGBT youth.

Mahogany identifies as queer, gender non-conforming, and trans.

== Filmography ==
=== Film and television ===
Year	Title	Role	Notes
2013	RuPaul's Drag Race	10th place (double elimination with Vivienne Pinay)	
2013	RuPaul's Drag Race: Untucked	4 episodes	
2013	New Now Next Awards		
2014	Looking	Singing "Shoulda Known Better"	
2015	Hush Up Sweet Charlotte	Trudy	
2016	Don't Call It Frisco	The Neighbor	Appears on Ep 1 & 3

=== Music videos ===
Year	Title	Album
2013	"Feeling Good"	Honey Love EP
2013	"It's Honey"	—N/a
2013	"Candy Yum Yum" by Kevin Mikal	Candy Yum Yum
2014	"Shoulda Known Better"	Honey Love EP
2014	"IN N OUT MISSION" (Beyoncé's Partition parody)	—N/a

== Discography ==
=== Singles ===
Song	Year	Album
"Hometown Glory" (cover of Adele)	2010	—N/a
"It's Honey"	2012	—N/a
"Mountain"	2014	Honey Love EP
"Take Him From Me"	2014	Honey Love EP
"Shoulda Known Better"	2014	Honey Love EP
"Feeling Good" (cover)	2014	Honey Love EP
"Lucky Star" (cover of Madonna)	2014	Honey Love EP

== See also ==
- List of transgender public officeholders in the United States
