= Miss Major Griffin-Gracy =

American activist and author (1940–2025)

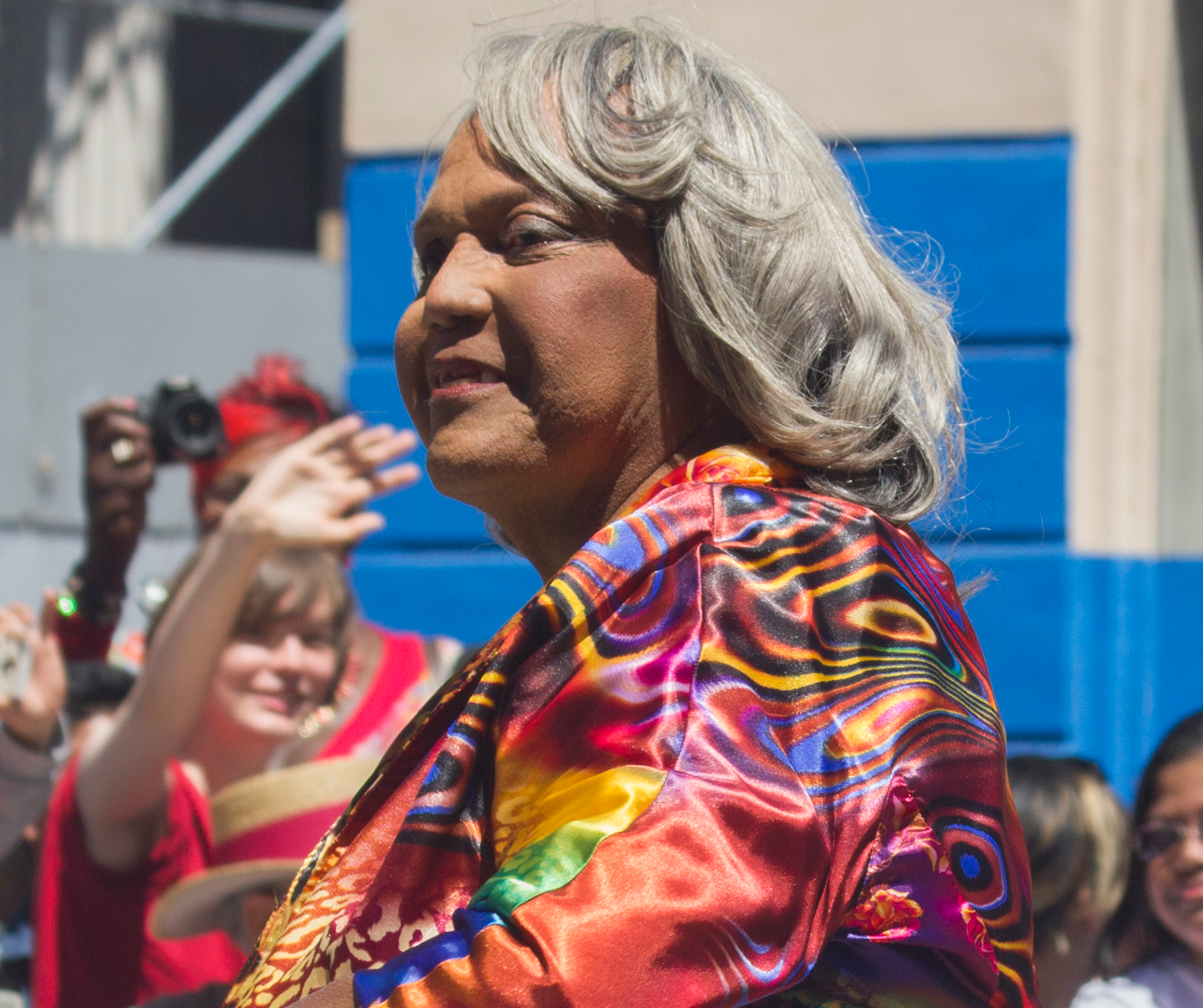
- Miss Major at San Francisco Pride in 2014
- Born: October 25, 1946; Chicago, Illinois, U.S.
- Died: October 13, 2025 (aged 78); Little Rock, Arkansas, U.S.
- Occupations: Activist and author
- Organization: Transgender Gender Variant Intersex Justice Project
- Known for: Transgender rights activism
- Notable work: Miss Major Speaks: Conversations with a Black Trans Revolutionary
- Children: 5

Miss Major Griffin-Gracy (October 25, 1946 – October 13, 2025), often referred to as Miss Major, was an American author, activist, and community organizer for transgender rights. A witness to the Stonewall Riots, she participated in activism and community organizing for a range of causes, and served as the first executive director for the Transgender Gender Variant Intersex Justice Project.

Griffin-Gracy contributed to oral history collections, including Captive Genders: Trans Embodiment and the Prison Industrial Complex, The Stonewall Reader, and The Stonewall Generation: LGBT Elders on Sex, Activism, and Aging. Her memoir, Miss Major Speaks: Conversations with a Black Trans Revolutionary, was released by Verso Books in 2023.

== Biography ==
=== Chicago ===
Griffin-Gracy was born on October 25, 1946, in Chicago. She was raised on the South Side, while her father worked for the post office and her mother managed a beauty shop. She had two siblings, Cookie and Sargeant. She has said after she came out as trans to her parents around age 12 or 13, they responded by enrolling her in psychiatric treatment and taking her to church.

Griffin-Gracy came out publicly as trans in Chicago in the late 1950s, and described drag balls at the time as places where "You had to keep your eyes open, had to watch your back, but you learned how to deal with that [...] We didn't know at the time that we were questioning our gender. We just knew it felt right". She also described the influence of Christine Jorgensen, who became well known in the 1950s for having gender-affirming surgery; according to Griffin-Gracy, "After Christine Jorgensen got her sex change, all of a sudden there was a black market of hormones out there", and she was familiar with how to obtain illicit hormones in Chicago.

Griffin-Gracy said she was expelled from college for having feminine clothes, and she lost her home with her parents after they refused to accept her gender. She worked as a showgirl at the Jewel Box Revue in Chicago and New York, and added "Griffin" to her name to honor her mother. She became a sex worker, a job which then provided the steadiest available income. After an incarceration in a psychiatric facility in lieu of jail in Chicago, she moved to New York.

=== New York ===
In a 2014 interview with the Bay Area Reporter, Griffin-Gracy said that after moving to New York City, she found the Stonewall Inn "provided us transwomen [sic?] with a nice place for social connection" and that few gay bars otherwise allowed entry to trans women at the time. She was a regular patron of the Stonewall, and was there on the first night of the 1969 Stonewall rebellion. As she recalled, police raids were common for LGBT bars, but "This one night, though, everybody decided this time we weren't going to leave the bar. And shit just hit the fan." Griffin-Gracy was notably critical of the symbolic commemoration of the actions that took place at Stonewall, stating that "People put so much into seeing Stonewall as this symbol... We were fighting for our lives. They're still killing us; they're still not giving us the respect we're due for putting up with their shit all these years."

Griffin-Gracy was heavily impacted by the death in 1970 of her friend Puppy, a trans woman who was determined by authorities to have died by suicide while Griffin-Gracy strongly suspected she was murdered by a client. She said, "Puppy's murder made me aware that we were not safe or untouchable and that if someone does touch us, no one gives a shit. We only have each other. We always knew this, but now we needed to take a step towards doing something about it. [...] We girls decided that whenever we got into a car with someone, another girl would write down as much information as possible. We would try not to just lean into the car window but get a guy to walk outside the car so that everyone could see him, so we all knew who he was if she didn't come back. That's how it started. Since no one was going to do it for us, we had to do it for ourselves." She described this event as the start of her activism.

Griffin-Gracy spent years in prison and on parole, including after Stonewall, when she received a five-year sentence following a robbery arrest. She described Frank "Big Black" Smith, a leader of the 1971 Attica Correctional Facility riots, as a mentor, after meeting him while incarcerated at the Clinton Correctional Facility at Dannemora. She said he encouraged her to learn about African-American history and politics, organizing, and the prison industrial complex. She was released from prison around 1974.

Over twenty years, Griffin-Gracy also experienced homelessness, received welfare, and mostly found hormones through the black market.

=== California ===
Griffin-Gracy began work in community services after moving to San Diego in 1978. She worked at a food bank and then in direct community services for trans women. Her work expanded into home health care during the AIDS epidemic in the United States. In the 1990s, Griffin-Gracy moved to the San Francisco Bay Area, and worked with multiple HIV/AIDS organizations, including the City of Refuge in San Francisco and the Tenderloin AIDS Resource Center.

In 2004, Griffin-Gracy began working at the Transgender Gender Variant Intersex Justice Project (TGIJP), shortly after it was founded by Alex Lee. She became the executive director of the organization, which is focused on providing support services to transgender, gender variant, and intersex people in prison. Her work included visiting trans women and men in California prisons to help coordinate access to legal and social services, and testimony at the California State Assembly and United Nations Human Rights Committee in Geneva about human rights violations in prisons.

While she was the executive director, she gave an interview to Jayden Donahue that was published in Captive Genders: Trans Embodiment and the Prison Industrial Complex, and described in a review by Arlen Katen in the Berkeley Journal of Gender, Law & Justice as "bluntly and powerfully stat[ing] that being trans* is an extension of the prison-industrial complex; even if not all trans* people end up in prison, their gender identities are constantly policed through other social and state mechanisms."

In an interview with Jessica Stern published in a 2011 Scholar and Feminist Online article, Griffin-Gracy described a sense of exclusion from the broader LGBT movement, described by Stern as for "herself and others, especially transgender people who are low-income, people of color, or have criminal records." In 2013, she was part of a campaign to revise wording on a Stonewall commemorative plaque; she advocated for "inclusive language to honor the sacrifice we as trans women displayed by taking back our power." In 2014, when she was honored as a community grand marshal for the San Francisco Pride Parade, she said, "We're finally getting some recognition. I'm proud it finally happened and I'm alive to see it because a lot of my girlfriends haven't made it this far. I'm trying to get as many girls as possible together at the parade so people can see we're a force to be reckoned with; we're not going anywhere."

=== Arkansas ===
Griffin-Gracy moved to Little Rock, Arkansas, after visiting the city for a screening of MAJOR!, the 2015 documentary about her. She developed a property she initially called the House of GG into an informal retreat center for trans people. The property includes a guest house, pool, hot tub, merry-go-round, various gardens, and over 80 palm trees. In 2023, she renamed the property to Tilifi, an acronym for Telling It Like It Fuckin' Is.

== Documentaries ==
A documentary titled Major! was released in 2015 and portrays Griffin-Gracy's role as an activist and mentor in the transgender community since the 1960s.

Griffin-Gracy was also the subject of the 2016 film Personal Things, by Tourmaline. She was an executive producer for the 2021 docu-series Trans in Trumpland.

== Miss Major Speaks ==
In May 2023, Verso Books published Miss Major Speaks: Conversations with a Black Trans Revolutionary, a memoir composed of interviews with Griffin-Gracy by journalist Toshio Meronek. Meronek is Griffin-Gracy's former assistant and also wrote a biographical overview of her for the book. In the memoir Griffin-Gracy reflected on her early life, education, experience as a sex worker, the 1969 Stonewall rebellion, incarcerations, knowing Frank "Big Black" Smith as a mentor, and her years of activism and community organizing, including during the AIDS epidemic in the 1980s, as well as her work as the director of the Transgender Gender Variant Intersex Justice Project (TGIJP).

In a review for Gender & Development, Haley McEwen writes, "Beyond an opportunity to learn about the life of a leader and elder in the Black transgender community through vivid personal accounts of activism and survival, listening to Miss Major speak is to subvert systems that have worked to erase and silence Black transgender women throughout history and in present reality." According to Vic Parsons in Huck, "Miss Major has herself has been a crucial source of hope and support to many trans people. [...] In some ways, this book is a new version of the community building and emotional support that is Miss Major's life's work."

Miss Major Speaks won the 2024 Lambda Literary Award for Transgender Nonfiction.

== Personal life and death ==
Griffin-Gracy had five children. Her eldest son was born in 1978, and she later adopted three more sons. In January 2021, Griffin-Gracy and her partner announced the birth of their fifth child.

Griffin-Gracy died on October 13, 2025, while she was under hospice care at her home in Little Rock, Arkansas. She was 78.

== Selected works ==
- Jayden Donahue (2011). "Making It Happen, Mama: A Conversation with Miss Major". In Stanley, Eric A.; Smith, Nat (eds.). Captive Genders: Trans Embodiment and the Prison Industrial Complex. Oakland, CA: AK Press. ISBN 9781849350716.
- Miss Major Griffin-Gracy (2015). "Ground Zero". In Brooks, Adrian (ed.). The Right Side of History: 100 Years of LGBTQ Activism. Cleis Press. pp. 87–94. ISBN 9781627781312.
- Miss Major Griffin-Gracy; CeCe McDonald; Toshio Meronek (2017). "Cautious Living: Black Trans Women and the Politics of Documentation". In Gossett, Reina; Stanley, Eric A.; Burton, Johanna (eds.). Trap Door: Trans Cultural Production and the Politics of Visibility. Cambridge, Massachusetts: The MIT Press. ISBN 9780262036603.
- New York City Trans Oral History Project; Lewis, Abram J. (2019). "Miss Major Griffin-Gracy". In New York Public Library; Baumann, Jason (eds.). The Stonewall Reader. New York: Penguin Books. pp. 208–215. ISBN 9780143133513.
- Miss Major Griffin-Gracy (2020). "Sex Workers' Struggles". In Fleishman, Jane (ed.). The Stonewall Generation: LGBT Elders on Sex, Activism, and Aging. Boston: Skinner House Books. pp. 1–18. ISBN 9781558968530.
- Griffin-Gracy, Miss Major; Meronek, Toshio (May 2023). Miss Major Speaks: Conversations with a Black Trans Revolutionary. London and New York: Verso. ISBN 9781839763342.

== Honors and awards ==
- 2013 Social Justice Sabbatical Award, Vanguard Public Foundation
- 2014 Bobbie Jean Baker Memorial Award, Asian Pacific Islander Wellness Center
- 2014 San Francisco Pride Parade, community grand marshal
- 2019 Acey Social Justice Award, Astraea Lesbian Foundation for Justice
- Women of the Year 2021, The Advocate
- 2023 José Esteban Muñoz Award, CLAGS (The Center for LGBTQ Studies)
