= The Trans List =

- Directed by: Timothy Greenfield-Sanders
- Produced by: Ingrid Duran; Catherine Pino; Sam McConnell; Tommy Walker; Chad Thompson
- Starring: Kylar Broadus; Caroline Cossey; Amos Mac; Bamby Salcedo; Buck Angel; Miss Major Griffin-Gracy; Nicole Maines; Shane Ortega; Caitlyn Jenner; Alok Vaid-Menon; Laverne Cox
- Narrated by: Janet Mock
- Edited by: Johanna Giebelhaus
- Music by: Chris Robertson; Neal Evans
- Release dates: June 16, 2016 (Provincetown International Film Festival); December 9, 2016 (United States)
- Running time: 57 minutes
- Country: United States
- Language: English

The Trans List is a 2016 documentary film by Timothy Greenfield-Sanders for HBO, about eleven transgender Americans: Buck Angel, Kylar Broadus, Caroline Cossey, Laverne Cox, Miss Major Griffin-Gracy, Caitlyn Jenner, Amos Mac, Nicole Maines, Shane Ortega, Bamby Salcedo, and Alok Vaid-Menon.

In this documentary group portrait, these eleven transgender people share their stories in their own words. The film shows the individuality and diverse perspectives of activists, artists, athletes, models, porn stars, military personnel, and entrepreneurs. They recount their experiences of love, desire, family, prejudice, and rebellion.

== Reception ==
In his film review for The Baltimore Sun, David Zurawik observed: "It's the stories of the not-so-famous individuals in this film… that most deeply resonate and, as a result, most successfully render a sense of transgender life.… As long as stories like these are eloquently told on TV, the possibility of understanding, acceptance and protection for those telling the stories increases dramatically."

== See also ==
- History of transgender people in the United States
- List of transgender people
- The Black List (film series)
