= Janet Mock =

American writer, TV host, director, and activist (born 1983)

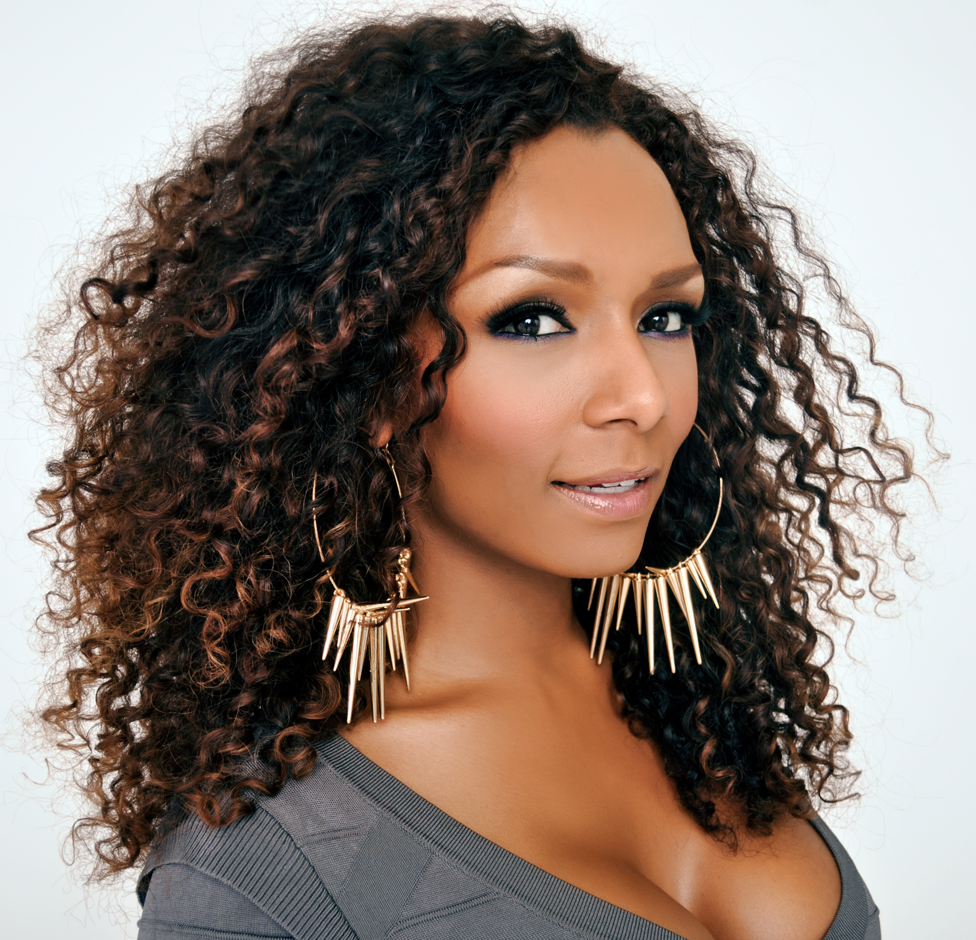
- Mock in 2012
- Born: 1983 (age 42–43); Honolulu, Hawaii, U.S.
- Education: University of Hawaiʻi at Mānoa (BA); New York University (MA)
- Occupations: Writer, transgender rights activist, television producer
- Known for: Redefining Realness, transgender rights activism
- Spouse: Aaron Tredwell (m. 2015; div. 2019)

Janet Mock (born 1983) is an American writer, television producer, and transgender rights activist. Her debut book, the memoir Redefining Realness, became a New York Times bestseller. She is a contributing editor for Marie Claire and a former staff editor of People magazine's website.

== Early life and education ==
Mock was born in Honolulu, Hawaii, the second child in the family. Her father, Charlie Mock III, is African-American, and her mother, Elizabeth (née Barrett), is of half Portuguese descent, part Asian descent and part Native Hawaiian (kānaka maoli) descent. Mock lived for most of her youth in her native Hawaii, with some time spent in Oakland, California and Dallas.

Mock began her transition in her first year of high school, and funded her medical transition by earning money as a sex worker in her teens. At the age of fifteen, Mock was introduced to the world of sex work. Mock says, "I went dressed up with my friends; we hung out with older girls, and when I say older girls I was 15 and some of them were 18 to 25, but they were light-years ahead of us in terms of their identities and their own transitions, of their confidence in their bodies, of proclaiming themselves to themselves and to one another. It was deeply a space of sisterhood and socializing for me." The sex worker experience, although it brings "deep sadness", was her means of survival as a trans person of color. She played volleyball in high school, a sport she had bonded over with her childhood friend Wendi, who helped Mock express her femininity. Mock explains that when she first met Wendi, she asked if Mock was a māhū. Mock describes māhū as "a label for those who live outside of the gender binary." She also added that her hula instructor at the time was a māhū, or trans woman. She chose her name Janet after Janet Jackson.

She was the first person in her family to go to college. She underwent gender confirming surgery in Thailand at the age of 18 in the middle of her first year in college. Mock earned a Bachelor of Arts in Fashion Merchandising from the University of Hawaiʻi at Mānoa in 2004 and a Master of Arts in journalism from New York University in 2006.

== Career ==
=== Writing ===
After graduating from New York University, Mock started working at People magazine, where she was a staff editor for more than five years. Her career in journalism shifted from editor to media advocate when she came out publicly as a trans woman in a 2011 Marie Claire article, written by Kierna Mayo in Mock's voice. Mock took issue with how the magazine represented her by stating that she was born and raised as a boy; she says she was always a girl. Mock said, "I was born in what doctors proclaim is a boy's body. I had no choice in the assignment of my sex at birth.... My genital reconstructive surgery did not make me a girl. I was always a girl."

In 2014, while promoting her book Redefining Realness, she reiterated that she did not choose the Marie Claire article title, and found it problematic. The editor of that piece, Lea Goldman, would later tweet in support of Mock: "To be fair, I do recall @janetmock & @kiernamayo taking issue with our @marieclaire hed, "I Was Born a Boy." I went with it anyway. #regrets". Mock became a contributing editor at Marie Claire, where she has written articles about racial representation in film and television as well as trans women's presence in the global beauty industry.

Mock submitted a video about her experiences as a transgender woman to the "It Gets Better" project in 2011, and has written on a variety of topics for Marie Claire, Elle, The Advocate, Huffington Post and XoJane.

In 2012, Atria Books, a division of Simon & Schuster, signed Mock to her first book deal for a memoir about her teenage years, which was released as Redefining Realness: My Path to Womanhood, Identity, Love & So Much More in February 2014. Redefining Realness made The New York Times bestseller list for hardcover nonfiction, and contains her personal memories often alongside statistics or social theory. Mock writes her book is about her personal experience as a trans woman of color. In the author's note, she writes she is aware of her privilege in writing this book and telling her story. She states in the author's note, "There is no universal women's experience". Feminist critic bell hooks referred to Mock's memoir as, "Courageous! This book is a life map for transformation" while Melissa Harris-Perry said, "Janet does what only great writers of autobiography accomplish — she tells a story of the self, which turns out to be a reflection of all humanity."

In 2017, Surpassing Certainty, Mock's second memoir, was published. The book's title is an allusion to Audre Lorde, who wrote, "And at last you'll know with surpassing certainty that only one thing is more frightening than speaking your truth. And that is not speaking."

=== Television and film ===
Shortly after signing her book deal, Mock left her position as an editor at People.com. Mock went on to host TakePart Live and her own culture show, So POPular!, on Shift. Mock has stated, in a Q&A with Tribune Business News, that her heroes and influences have been women writers such as Zora Neale Hurston, Maya Angelou, Alice Walker, and Toni Morrison. While taping So POPular!, she continued to work with MSNBC as a guest host for the Melissa Harris-Perry show, host of the Global Citizen Festival, and covered the White House Correspondence Dinner's red carpet for Shift. She is also a special correspondent for Entertainment Tonight. In 2015, she appeared in the independent documentary film Coming Out.

On December 5, 2016, "The Trans List" aired on HBO. The film was produced by Mock along with director Timothy Greenfield-Sanders. Mock also interviewed the cast, which features eleven prominent transgender figures: Laverne Cox, Miss Major Griffin-Gracy, Buck Angel, Kylar Broadus, Caroline Cossey, Shane Ortega, Alok Vaid-Menon, Nicole Maines, Bamby Salcedo, Amos Mac and Caitlyn Jenner.

The television show Pose premiered on June 3, 2018, on FX. Mock is a writer, director, and producer on the show, and is the first trans woman of color hired as a writer for a TV series in history. It follows the lives of five trans women in the New York ballroom scene in 1987. Pose "looks at the juxtaposition of several segments of life and society in New York: the rise of the luxury Trump-era universe, the downtown social and literary scene, and the ball culture world." The series has been congratulated for casting actual trans women in trans roles and for accurately depicting a unique queer subculture. In 2018 Mock directed the episode of Pose titled "Love Is the Message", thus making her the first transgender woman of color to write and direct any television episode. However, following the final season's premiere Mock spoke up against the show's treatment of its creatives behind the scenes - taking issue with her pay and the writing.

In 2019, Mock signed a three-year deal with Netflix giving them exclusive rights to her TV series and a first-look option on feature film projects; this made her the first openly transgender woman of color to secure a deal with a major content company.

In November 2021, Mock was set to direct The International Sweethearts of Rhythm for Sony Pictures.

=== Speaking and guest appearances ===
Mock is featured in a 2011 documentary called Dressed. She is also featured in an LGBT documentary, The OUT List, which screened on HBO on June 27, 2013.

In February 2014, Mock joined Piers Morgan Live on CNN, for a face-to-face interview. After the show aired, the interview resulted in a Twitter feud between the Piers Morgan Live team and Mock. She accused them of "sensationalizing her life" by focusing on her personal and physical life instead of her new book, Redefining Realness. Mock told BuzzFeed that Morgan did not "really want to talk about trans issues, he wants to sensationalize my life and not really talk about the work that I do and what the purpose of me writing this book was about." Morgan received criticism from the LGBTQ community, resulting in Mock's second invitation onto the show. Morgan attempted to understand the root of the criticism as Mock explained the problem with the way trans people and their lives are represented in mainstream media.

To address the controversy, Mock appeared on The Colbert Report on February 18, 2014, where the host skewered Morgan and gave Mock space to speak about her book, advocacy and the need to listen to trans people when they declare who they are. In an interview with Fusion's Alicia Menendez, Mock and Menendez "flipped the script" and used the Morgan interview as a teaching lesson by putting Mock on the questioning end of the interview to flip the conversation around gender. Mock as the interviewer asked Menendez to prove her gender with questions like "do you have a vagina" to prove that she is cisgender, interrogating the ways in which trans people are questioned by the media.

In December 2014, Mock was featured on the fifth anniversary cover of C☆NDY magazine along with 13 other transgender women – Laverne Cox, Carmen Carrera, Geena Rocero, Isis King, Gisele Alicea, Leyna Ramous, Dina Marie, Nina Poon, Juliana Huxtable, Niki M'nray, Pêche Di, Carmen Xtravaganza and Yasmine Petty.

In April 2015, Oprah Winfrey invited Mock to be a guest on Super Soul Sunday for a segment titled, "Becoming Your Most Authentic Self" where she discussed "proudly and unapologetically" claiming her identities. In September 2015, Mock was invited back to join Winfrey's Super Soul Sessions where Mock discussed, "Embracing The Otherness." In 2016, Mock was named to Oprah's SuperSoul 100 list of visionaries and influential leaders.

Mock has been featured on the covers of British VOGUE, Marie Claire, Entertainment Weekly, The Hollywood Reporter, Who What Wear, Paper, and OUT magazines. Mock has also been interviewed on ELLEN, Wendy Williams, The Daily Show, Late Night with Seth Meyers, Desus & Mero, and Real Time with Bill Maher. She has also appeared on Real Time with Bill Maher, Melissa Harris-Perry, The Colbert Report, and The Nightly Show.

In March 2016, the Hillel at Brown University invited Mock to speak, but she canceled after Brown Students for Justice in Palestine protested the invitation.

== Activism ==
In 2012, Mock started a Twitter hashtag to empower transgender women, called #GirlsLikeUs, which received attention from several queer-media sites. Also in 2012, she gave the Lavender Commencement keynote speech honoring LGBT students at the University of Southern California and delivered the commencement address for Pitzer College in 2015. She also served as co-chair, nominee and presenter at the 2012 GLAAD Media Awards.

In June 2013, Mock joined the board of directors of the Arcus Foundation, a charitable foundation focused on great ape conservation and LGBT rights.

In 2014, following the conviction of activist (and transgender woman of color) Monica Jones, Mock joined a campaign against a Phoenix law that allows police to arrest anyone suspected of "prostitution", which targets transgender women of color. Mock tweeted, "Speak against the profiling of #TWOC [trans woman of color], like Monica Jones. Tweet #StandWithMonica + follow @SWOPPhx [Sex Workers Outreach Project – Phoenix Chapter] now!"

On January 21, 2017, Mock spoke at the Women’s March on Washington.

== Honors and awards ==
In November 2012, the Sylvia Rivera Law Project gave Mock their Sylvia Rivera Activist Award.

Mock was included in the Trans 100, the first annual list recognizing 100 transgender advocates in the United States, and gave the keynote speech at the launch event on March 29, 2013, in Chicago.

On November 14, 2013, Mock was honored as a member of the OUT100, Out's 100 "most compelling people of the year" and introduced Laverne Cox as the recipient of the Reader's Choice Award at the event. She was also named one of Good's GOOD 100 for "Building An Online Army to Defend #GirlsLikeUs."

Mock was included in the video accompanying the Google Doodle for International Women's Day 2014.

In April 2014, GLSEN presented Mock with the Inspiration Award at the GLSEN Respect Awards and in October, the Feminist Press honored her activism at the Women & Power Gala.

In 2014, Mock also was included as part of The Advocate's annual "40 Under 40" list, as well as their list of 50 Most Influential LGBT People in Media. That year, she was also included in the annual Root 100, which honors "standout black leaders, innovators and culture shapers" aged 45 and younger, and Planned Parenthood presented the Maggie Award for Media Excellence in "Social Media Campaign" to Mock for her work in creating a powerful and safe space for trans voices online and beyond through her #RedefiningRealness Tumblr page.

In 2015, Time named her one of "the 30 Most Influential People on the Internet" and one of "12 New Faces of Black Leadership" and Fast Company included Mock as one of 2015's "Most Creative People in Business."

In February 2015, the American Library Association honored Redefining Realness with the Stonewall Book Award. Later that year, Mock's book was nominated as a Lambda Literary Award finalist in the category of Transgender Nonfiction and The Women's Way awarded Mock with their Book Prize.

In June 2015, Mock received the inaugural José Esteban Muñoz award from CLAGS: The Center for LGBTQ Studies – an award that is given to an individual who promotes Queer Studies in their work or activism.

Along with Tiq Milan and Candis Cayne, Mock accepted an award in honor of Marsha P. Johnson and Sylvia Rivera's lives and work at the 2016 LOGO Trailblazer Honors. She referred to Johnson and Rivera as her "fairy godmothers because they created the blueprint for our liberation."

Mock was included in Time magazine's 100 Most Influential People of 2018. That year, her memoir Surpassing Certainty was a finalist for the 2018 Lambda Literary Award for Transgender Nonfiction.

In 2019, Mock received a Primetime Emmy Award nomination for Outstanding Drama Series at the 71st Primetime Emmy Awards for her work as a producer on season 1 of Pose. She was nominated for this award again in 2021 at the 73rd Primetime Emmy Awards, as well as being nominated for Outstanding Writing for a Drama Series, both nominations are for her work on season 3 of Pose.

== Personal life ==
Mock lives in New York City. She married photographer Aaron Tredwell in 2015. The couple filed for divorce in February 2019.

Mock began dating Pose actor Angel Bismark Curiel in 2018.

== Works ==
=== Bibliography ===
- Redefining Realness: My Path to Womanhood, Identity, Love & So Much More. New York: Atria Books. 2014. ISBN 978-1-4767-0912-3.
- Surpassing Certainty: What My Twenties Taught Me. New York: Atria Books. 2017. ISBN 978-1-5011-4579-7.
- An interview with Mock is featured in the book Queer and Trans Artists of Color: Stories of Some of Our Lives (2014), co-edited by Nia King with Jessica Glennon-Zukoff and Terra Mikalson.

=== Filmography ===
==== Television ====
The numbers in directing and writing credits refer to the number of episodes.

Title	Year	Credited as				Network	Notes
Title	Year	Creator	Director	Writer	Executive Producer	Network	Notes
Pose	2018–2021	No	Yes (6)	Yes (13)	only producer	FX	
The Politician	2019	No	Yes (1)	No	No	Netflix	
Hollywood	2020	No	Yes (2)	Yes (2)	Yes	Netflix	Miniseries
Dahmer – Monster: The Jeffrey Dahmer Story	2022	No	No	Yes (2)	Yes	Netflix	Miniseries

== See also ==
- LGBT culture in New York City
- List of LGBT people from New York City
- LGBT African Americans
- List of transgender film and television directors
- NYC Pride March
