= Coming out (disambiguation) =

Coming out of the closet is a metaphor mostly used to describe LGBTQ people's self-disclosure of their sexual orientation, romantic orientation, or gender identity.

Coming out may also refer to:

== Film and television ==
- Coming Out (1989 film), an East German film directed by Heiner Carow
- Coming Out (2000 film), a South Korean short film directed by Kim Ji-woon
- Coming Out (2013 film), a Hungarian film directed by Dénes Orosz
- Coming Out (2015 film), an American documentary film directed by Alden Peters
- Coming Out (TV series), a Canadian television series
- "Coming Out", an episode of the television series The Lousy World
- "I'm Coming Out", an episode of the television series Ugly Betty

== Music ==
- Coming Out (album), a 1976 album by the Manhattan Transfer
- "I'm Coming Out", a 1980 song by Diana Ross

== Other uses ==
- Coming Out (novel), a 2006 novel by Danielle Steel
- Coming-out party, a traditional term for a debutante ball

== See also ==
- Come Out (disambiguation)
- Come-outer, a person who withdraws from an established organization or who advocates political reform
