= WISPA =

WISPA may refer to:

- Wireless Internet Service Provider Association
- Women's International Squash Players Association

== See also ==
- Wispa, a chocolate bar
- Wi Spa controversy, a controversy at Wi Spa in Los Angeles
