= Wi Spa controversy =

2021 transgender rights controversy

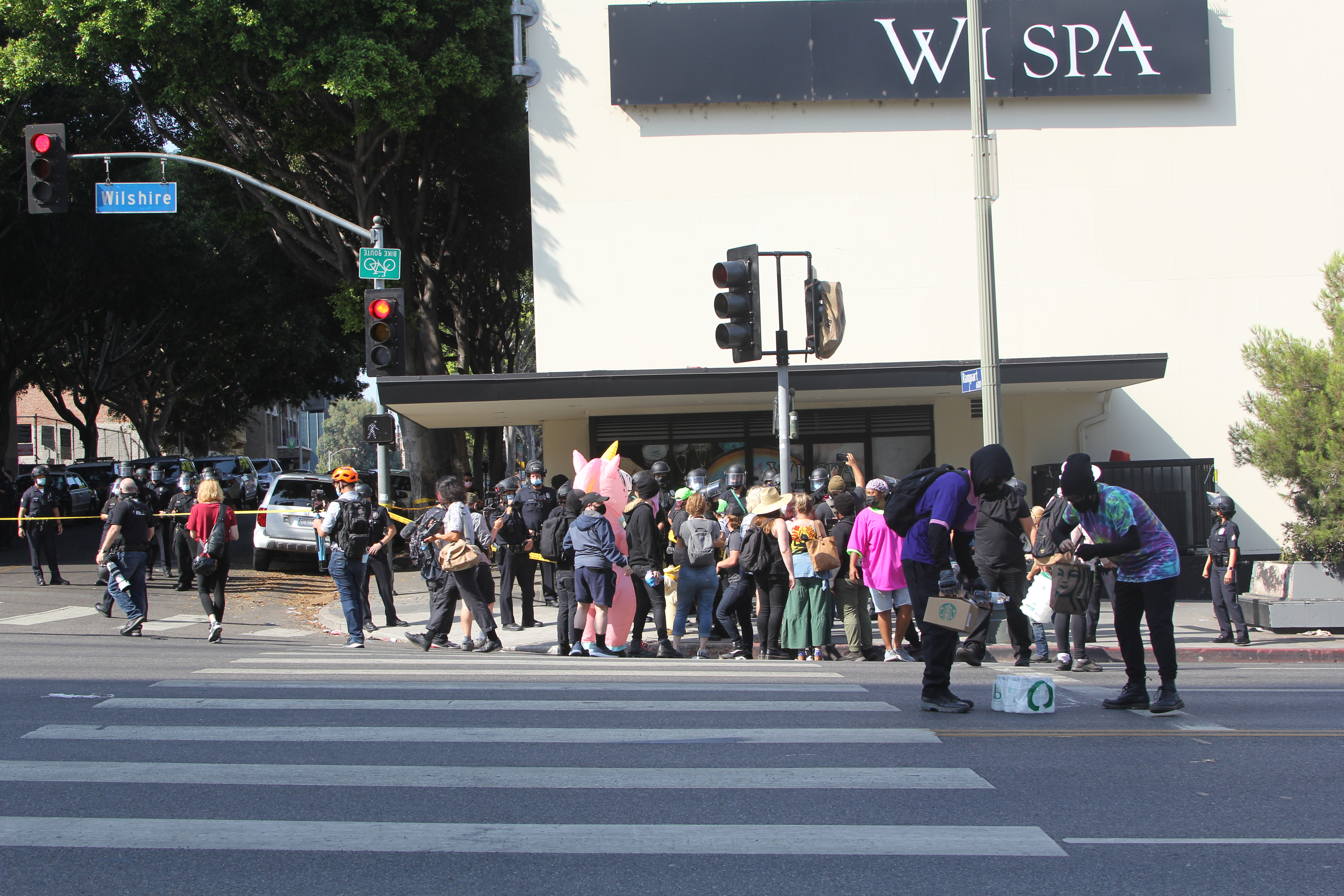
- The exterior of Wi Spa on July 17, 2021. Police and demonstrators can be seen.
- Date: June 24, 2021
- Location: Wi Spa, 2700 Wilshire Blvd, Koreatown/Westlake, Los Angeles, California; 34°03′39″N 118°16′58″W
- Also known as: Wi Spa incident
- Cause: Allegation of nudity, possibly indecent exposure, in a women's changing room by a gender-nonconforming person with a penis
- Outcome: Wi Spa protests
- Arrests: 1 (suspect) on December 13, 2022
- Accused: 52 year-old gender-nonconforming individual
- Charges: Indecent exposure
- Verdict: Acquitted (Not Guilty)

On June 24, 2021, a woman posted a video to Instagram in which she had confronted staff at Wi Spa, a Korean spa in Los Angeles, about the presence of a nude individual with a penis, most commonly believed to be a trans woman, in the women's changing area of the spa. The video went viral, attracting significant attention from gender-critical feminists (also termed trans-exclusionary radical feminists/TERFs) and from some media, which led to protests and counter-protests. Some media outlets initially questioned whether the alleged incident had been a hoax.

On August 30, 2021, an individual, commonly reported to be a transgender woman, (Note: The suspect has been commonly reported to be a trans woman. In an interview with the New York Post, the suspect said their legal gender designation was female. However, The Guardian claimed the suspect's "gender identity was also unclear". In an interview with LA Magazine the suspect said: "he/him and she/her pronouns are just fine but [the suspect] loathes they/them". On their driver's licence, the suspect is listed as female.) was charged with indecent exposure relating to the alleged incident after four women and one girl filed police reports in July 2021. The suspect had previously been convicted of indecent exposure in 2002 and 2003, being obliged to register as a sex offender since 2006 and convicted for failing to register in 2008. The suspect was awaiting trial on seven counts of indecent exposure, according to court documents from 2019. The suspect denied guilt, claiming harassment over being a trans person.

On February 12, 2023, a judge ruled that the indecent exposure case could proceed. On June 1, 2025, the jury acquitted the suspect on all charges, concluding the trial.

== Background ==
Traditionally, Korean baths and spas that carry the appellation jjimjilbang permit nudity within their gender-segregated areas, and are a "family affair". Wi Spa is a 24-hour, Korean spa located in the Koreatown neighborhood of Los Angeles. It has four floors: a women's floor; a men's floor; one mixed-gender, family-friendly jjimjilbang floor; and a rooftop, non-bathing floor. Wi Spa's policies for guests mandate that swimwear not be worn in the gender-segregated floors, while "proper clothing" is required in the mixed-gender floor.

Wi Spa has an "Equal Access" policy for customers that covers "age, color, national origin, citizenship status, physical or mental disability, race, religion, creed, gender, sex, sexual orientation, gender identity and/or expression, marital status or any other characteristic protected by federal, state or local law".

== Incident ==
A cisgender woman going by the name "Cubana Angel" posted a video to her Instagram account on June 24, 2021, alleging that Wi Spa had allowed a "man with a penis" to be nude in the women's floor of the spa, and specifically in the clothes-changing area. Angel, accompanied by two other women, confronted Wi Spa staff claiming that a man was in the changing area and accosting staff for several minutes. During this time, Angel repeatedly mentioned the possibility of the individual's penis being exposed to children.

According to a subsequent news release from the Los Angeles Police Department, the incident occurred on June 23, the day before the video was uploaded.

In July 2021, it was reported that the unknown individual alleged to have acted in this manner had not been confirmed as a trans woman, but that the belief that they were had become common. During the incident video, a masked spa worker also seemed to assume the patron in question was transgender. Another customer questioned Cubana Angel if she was referring to a "transgender person", and she responded "There is no such thing as transgender." In a follow-up comment on the video, Angel posted "Real Women Rights Matter", using all caps. On her personal website, she later said, over a week after the incident, that the individual was "a man who identified as a woman".

=== Spa response ===
In a statement to Los Angeles Magazine published June 29, 2021, Wi Spa outlined its position: "Like many other metropolitan areas, Los Angeles contains a transgender population, some of whom enjoy visiting a spa. Wi Spa strives to meet the needs of all its customers." The spa pointed out that California Civil Code 51(b) and 51(e)(5) makes it illegal for the spa to "discriminate" against transgender and gender-nonconforming people.

(b) All persons within the jurisdiction of this state are free and equal, and no matter what their sex, race, color, religion, ancestry, national origin, disability, medical condition, genetic information, marital status, sexual orientation, citizenship, primary language, or immigration status are entitled to the full and equal accommodations, advantages, facilities, privileges, or services in all business establishments of every kind whatsoever.

(e)(5) "Sex" includes, but is not limited to, pregnancy, childbirth, or medical conditions related to pregnancy or childbirth. "Sex" also includes, but is not limited to, a person's gender. "Gender" means sex, and includes a person's gender identity and gender expression. "Gender expression" means a person's gender-related appearance and behavior whether or not stereotypically associated with the person's assigned sex at birth. — California State Legislature, California Civil Code,

=== False accusations ===
On July 3, Precious Child, a Los Angeles trans woman, a musician and activist, was falsely accused online of being the alleged person referred to by the incident video. The accusation spread quickly and she began receiving abusive messages, physical threats (including death threats), and accusations of pedophilia. Child said she had never visited Wi Spa and found the accusations of pedophilia "deeply hurtful", having been a victim of child sexual abuse. The woman who made the incident video posted later on Instagram that Child was not the alleged culprit. While the only notable individual example, other trans individuals in the LA area reported similar online harassment that ostensibly resulted from the incident.

In an August 6 interview with On the Media, Lois Beckett, author of the original report in The Guardian, paraphrased Child's experience as it was relayed to her, saying that the comments received by Child came from "different demographics". Specifically, "[Child] saw comments from sort of militia group types in the US, then from broader pro-Trump people in the US, then she said that like transphobic feminists in Germany and in Australia were weighing in".

=== Hoax allegations ===
On July 7, 2021, the Los Angeles Blade reported that anonymous sources from Wi Spa staff and from within the Los Angeles Police Department (LAPD) had cast significant doubt on the incident as described in the video. The Wi Spa source said that the spa's transgender clients are well known by staff and none of them were recorded as present in the spa the day of the incident. The LAPD source said the department could not at that time evidentially substantiate the incident nor find evidence of any transgender person's presence in the day in question inside Wi Spa. The Blade writer speculated that a "cisgender man" could have acted in concert with the woman in the video, recalling a 2015 incident in Washington in which anti-transgender activists had asked cisgender men to enter female-only areas as a form of protest.

According to Los Angeles Magazine, on July 19, "several outlets have questioned whether the video was staged to generate outrage at a time when conservative politicians are weaponizing trans rights for political gain."

On December 19, 2022, Los Angeles Magazine published an interview with the suspect in which they repudiate the hoax notion, speculating that a lack of notoriety and paying cash at the Spa minimized their perception.

=== Political campaign by complainant ===
On July 18, The Intercept reported Cubana Angel joined Cure America Action (citing her press conference hosted by the organization) in a campaign to repeal California's anti-discrimination law for trans individuals. This was reflected on her personal website where she called for said repeal. Cure America Action is a Washington, D.C.-based, nonprofit organization that claims it "advocates for conservative principles based on Christianity, Capitalism, and the Constitution." Marc Little, a conservative pastor, lawyer, and the organization's executive director, was representing Cubana Angel.

=== Criminal charges ===
In July 2021, four women and one girl filed formal legal complaints with the LAPD. In their complaints, the women alleged that they saw "male genitals exposed in the women's section" of the spa. Cubana Angel was the first to file such a report, on July 6.

On August 30, 2021, a 52-year-old individual, mostly reported as a trans woman, was charged by the Los Angeles County District Attorney's office with five counts of felony indecent exposure in connection with the incident, corresponding to the five individuals who had filed complaints in July. An arrest warrant was issued for said individual.

The suspect had previous convictions for the same offense from 2002 and 2003, becoming, as a result, obliged to register as a sex offender in 2006. In 2008, the suspect was convicted for failing to register as a sex offender. The suspect also had an open case from 2018, in which they have pled "not guilty" to seven counts of indecent exposure in front of women and children in a Los Angeles park. Regarding the 2018 case, the LAPD circulated an internal flyer which described the suspect as "homeless" and alleged the suspect "claims to identify as female" in order to gain access to women's locker rooms and showers.

In an interview with the New York Post published on September 2, 2021, the suspect denied their guilt, stating that they were the victim of "transphobic harassment" and were legally female. The suspect also said that they used the women's section of the spa facilities and were in the hot tub when she encountered Cubana Angel, claiming, "She [Angel] never saw me naked. I was underwater with water all the way up to my chest."

On December 13, 2022, the suspect was arrested and jailed, bond set at $350,000, with a court date of December 30. In a Los Angeles Magazine interview taken in September 2022 and published on December 19, 2022, after the suspect's arrest, the suspect stated to have come forward to the LAPD shortly after the incident, but was not taken seriously. The suspect again denied guilt, stated they were the victim of the situation, and that Cubana Angel "concocted" her incident narrative.

At a pre-trial hearing in February 2023, two witnesses attested that the suspect's penis had been erect. This was corroborated by the initial police report, filed by the witness known as Cubana Angel, which stated the suspect's penis was “partially erect”. A fourteen-year-old witness described the suspect's penis as “soft,” but added that she had never seen a penis before. The suspect spoke with a reporter during a court recess and was quoted saying, “Why weren’t the two dozen women in the spa indecently exposed? Only men can be indecently exposed, but women can’t? Only the penis is indecent.” The judge ruled that the case could go forward.

On June 1, 2025, after a trial that ran four weeks, the suspect was pronounced not guilty on the 2021 Wi Spa and 2018 West Hollywood cases.

== Incident virality and public reactions ==
Since it was posted, the incident video progressively went viral, peaking most notably on Sunday, June 27, 2021. The video had increasingly circulated online on right-wing and far-right sites, as well as trans-exclusionary feminist spaces. Trans-excluding spaces included Mumsnet, Ovarit, and Spinster. Ian Miles Cheong, a conservative political commentator, posted two videos about the incident on June 27 via his Twitter account that reached hundreds of thousands of views. Andy Ngo, a controversial right-wing journalist, also posted on Twitter about the incident.

The controversy was discussed on Fox News beginning from June 28, with commentator Tucker Carlson featuring the story on his show, Tucker Carlson Tonight, that evening. Various right-wing media, including Fox News, The Christian Post, OneNewsNow, Blaze Media, The Daily Wire and RealClearPolitics, ran stories about the incident in a manner that Media Matters for America called "uncritically spread." Media Matters claimed the right was using a "disputed story" to "attack transgender rights." The Guardian called the manner in which right-wing media characterized the incident as "distorted".

The spa was review bombed on Yelp and Tripadvisor following the extensive public awareness of the incident.

=== LGBTQ reactions ===
On June 30, KCAL-TV, a Los Angeles CBS affiliate, posted a story that quoted Bamby Salcedo, CEO of the Los Angeles-based TransLatina Coalition, who said the behavior of the woman in the incident video is not uncommon: "we experience this type of violence every single day of our lives." Salcedo stated that her behavior showed ignorance.

On July 5, The Washington Post listed multiple statements by LGBTQ individuals reacting to the incident: Zac Boyer, a manager at Stonewall Columbus, an Ohio-based LGBTQ organization, said the community wants to "preserve women-only spaces," but that "women have a variety of genitalia". San Diego Trans Pride organizer Jae Red Rose said of the alleged trans spa-visitor: "She was within the women's section, which, you know, is exactly where she should be!"

On August 6, Julia Serano, an author and trans activist, said, while being interviewed for On the Media, that the rhetoric used by anti-trans protesters is heavily reminiscent of Anita Bryant's rhetoric from the 1970s, noting that the QAnon slogan "SaveTheChildren" (SaveOurChildren was also used) "echoes" the name of Bryant's organization, Save Our Children. While Serano did not believe the link to the 1970s anti-gay slogan was originally intentional by QAnon adherents, Serano stated it was "essentially the same usage."

== Protests ==
Wi Spa protests
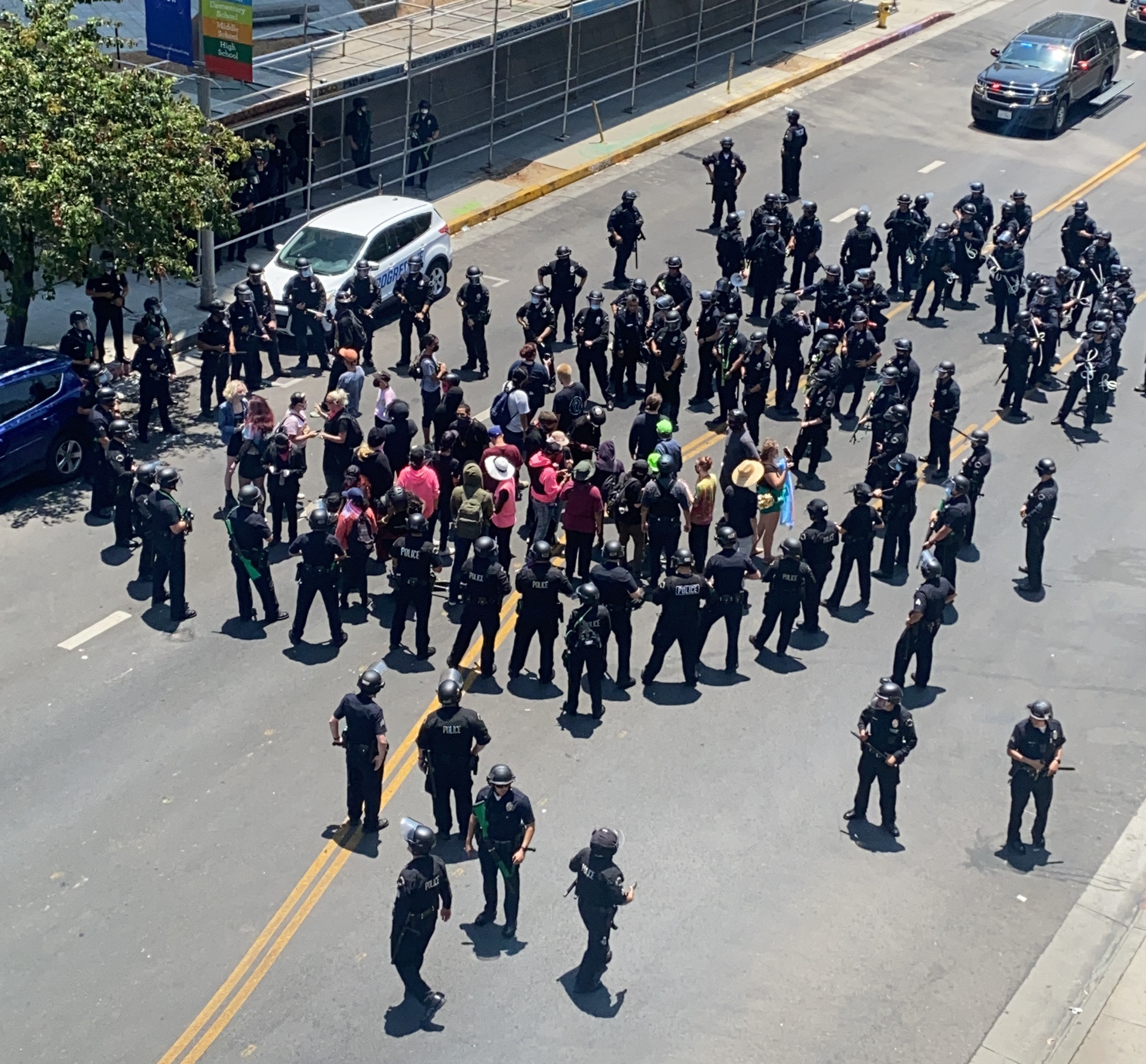
- A large group of Los Angeles Police Department officers kettle a pro-trans protest group on South Commonwealth Avenue a few blocks away from Wi Spa on July 17, 2021.
- Date: July 3 and July 17, 2021
- Location: Immediate vicinity and surrounding area of Wi Spa
- Caused by: Wi Spa controversy
- Goals: Oppose transgender access to spa (anti-trans protesters); Support transgender access to spa (pro-trans protesters); Maintain civil status quo (LAPD)
- Methods: Political demonstration, Melee (group vs. group, groups vs. police)

Parties
| QAnon conspiracy theorists; Proud Boys; Trans-exclusionary feminists; Conservative Christians | LGBTQ activists; Antifa activists | Los Angeles Police Department (Rampart Division); City of Los Angeles |

Casualties
- Injuries: Police-inflicted injuries involving less-than-lethal weapons, no police or demonstrators hospitalized.
- Arrested: 0 (July 3); 38 (July 17)

Evaluating the composition of demonstrators, the Los Angeles Blade described those protesting against the spa itself and transgender access to the spa as "a mix of religious fundamentalist street preachers, QAnon conspiracy theorists chanting 'save our children', and Proud Boys". Counter-protesters were noted as LGBTQ activists and "black bloc, possibly antifa, demonstrators". Newsweek corroborated that QAnon and Proud Boy members were present.

The involvement of antifa was disputed, with some sources claiming antifa involvement and others being inconclusive. A July 17 report by NBC Los Angeles stated a group using the name "SoCal Antifa" was involved in the July 3 protest, but the station could not determine if the group were involved in the July 17 confrontation. A July 19 article by Los Angeles Magazine claimed the black bloc demonstrators were "Antifa-aligned". A July 20 report by the private news-site American Military News stated that the involvement of antifa was alleged by Andy Ngo but could not otherwise be confirmed. A July 31 article by Los Angeles Magazine claimed SoCal Antifa was involved in both the July 3 and 17 protests.

=== July 3 ===
Outside Wi Spa, anti-trans demonstrators scheduled the protest to begin at 11am, while pro-trans demonstrators had already scheduled for 10am. The opposing groups came to blows repeatedly, after which the Los Angeles Police Department declared that the whole gathering constituted an "unlawful assembly." The LAPD Rampart Division suppressed both groups, with riot control units using physical force, less-than-lethal weapons, and batons. Two people were stabbed, while another was beaten with a pipe. Slate magazine claimed that one of the stabbings was committed by an anti-trans protester against a pro-trans protester, while the other was of an anti-trans protester accidentally stabbed by an allied individual. The Intercept reported that "the violence was wrongly attributed to left-wing counterprotesters" since journalists Vishal Singh and Rocky Romano had produced "clear visual evidence" that the knife attacks and the metal-pipe assault on Romano were "the work of conservative" persons. One individual was taken to medical facilities following the protest. Police said they were investigating three instances of assault and battery and two instances of assault with a deadly weapon resulting from the July 3 demonstrations. No arrests were made that day.

Andy Ngo, a right-wing journalist, was in attendance.

=== July 17 ===
Demonstrators and counter-demonstrators again surrounded Wi Spa in the late morning; however, police presence had been increased compared to the July 3 protest. According to the LAPD, the groups began to scuffle between each other and police around 11:10 a.m., police had smoke grenades and other objects thrown at them, after which an unlawful assembly was declared. After the declaration, LAPD used less-than-lethal bean bag rounds and 40-mm riot guns, as well as batons, against protesters. One pro-trans protester was pummeled into the pavement with repeated baton strikes, another, a woman, was shot point-blank with a bean bag causing her to collapse, and a journalist had their hand broken by police baton. After the event, police said pepper spray, stun guns, and knives were found on the streets. There were no reported officer injuries or medical transport of any protesters.

According to The Intercept reportage, police focused primarily on pro-trans left-wing demonstrators, kettling and arresting a significant group (pictured right). Overall, 38 were arrested, most of them pro-trans demonstrators. When questioned about the seemingly disparate treatment, police claimed that anti-trans/right-wing demonstrators were not arrested due to complying with the dispersion order, however left-aligned activists state that due to the kettling that pro-trans demonstrators were not allowed by police to disperse.

In a September 2022 interview with Los Angeles Magazine, the suspect of the incident stated they attended this event, never leaving their vehicle. The suspect also stated they were accused of being a Proud Boys member by a "mixture of Antifa types as well as this Black and pink group". When the suspect informed the group they were the suspect in question, they were not believed.

=== Hostility toward journalists ===
==== July 3 ====
Rocky Romano, a filmmaker-photojournalist, was struck with a metal pipe. On September 14, charges of assault with a deadly weapon were filed against a 30-year-old individual alleged to have perpetrated the attack. The individual fled the scene in a vehicle linked to a minor 2021 California gubernatorial recall election candidate. On September 22, the individual was taken into custody by the LAPD.

==== July 17 ====
Hostility toward journalists was evident from both right and left-wing protesters as well as police.

The Guardian journalist Lois Beckett was threatened and assaulted by right-wing demonstrators, being accosted, pursued, and eventually shoved to the ground after being pelted with water bottles. A local anti-fascist activist claims Beckett's attacker was a known Proud Boy who was present at the July 3 event.

A group of black bloc counter-protesters accosted and surrounded photojournalist Eric Levai, demanding he delete images. Levai, who fled the confrontation, had his equipment stolen. Beckett stated in an interview she thought the bloc believed Levai was attempting to dox them. The hand of a non-binary citizen-journalist was broken by police baton while filming.

Speaking to On the Media on August 6, Lois Beckett said the psyche of demonstrators on July 17 was "tremendous anxiety and paranoia about being identified", saying that protesters were very hesitant to be captured on media by someone not aligned with them, and violence against journalists allows groups to control the narrative. Additionally, responding to Brandy Zadrozny's comment about internet performativity, Beckett said the nigh-omnipresence of media made identification "unavoidable".

== See also ==
- Transgender rights in the United States
