= Amos Mac =

American writer, photographer and publisher

- Born: Augusta, Georgia
- Education: The New School
- Known for: Photographer, writer, and publisher
- Notable work: "Original Plumbing"
- Website: https://www.amosmac.com/

Amos Mac (born 1981) is an American writer, photographer and publisher from Augusta, Georgia. Mac is based in Los Angeles as a writer for television and film .

== Early life ==
He grew up in Philadelphia, Pennsylvania.

== Original Plumbing ==
As a trans man, he co-founded and became editor in chief of Original Plumbing, a magazine that focuses on the culture of female-to-male trans men and sexuality. Mac chose Original Plumbing's title as a playful take on the obsession the media has with the genitalia of trans people. To express and explore his culture of being a trans man in the United States, he and his friend Rocco Kayiatos started the magazine Original Plumbing in 2009 while they were both living in San Francisco.

== Photography and other notable work ==
As a visual artist, Mac's photography have appeared in The New York Times, Vogue Italia, BUTT Magazine, and OUT.

In 2011, he went on a national tour with feminist art group Sister Spit where he showcased photographs, read his writing and spoke candidly about trans representation in the media.

In 2015 Amos Mac photographed a campaign for H&M's sister brand, & Other Stories, which became the first fashion campaign created by an all-transgender cast and crew. The campaign featured models Hari Nef and Valentijn De Hingh.

In June 2016, it was announced that Mac would be featured in The Trans List an HBO documentary film produced by Janet Mock along with director Timothy Greenfield-Sanders. Mock also interviews the cast, which features ten prominent transgender figures besides Mac: Laverne Cox, Miss Major Griffin-Gracy, Buck Angel, Kylar Broadus, Caroline Cossey, Shane Ortega, Alok Vaid-Menon, Nicole Maines, Bamby Salcedo and Caitlyn Jenner.

In The Trans List, Mac describes his life before transitioning. "I really don't know why I was waiting for so long," Mac says. "It seemed like it was no longer an option for my sanity or for my health. I had to stop spending so much time trying to cover up my emotions and my problems, and I had to deal with myself."

Amos Mac sat for photographer Mark Seliger for his 2016 book of photographs On Christopher Street: Transgender Stories.

== Film and television ==
Mac currently works in Los Angeles, California on television shows and films. It was announced in October 2019 that Amos would be a writer for the Gossip Girl reboot for HBO Max.

With Aisling Chin-Yee, Mac co-wrote No Ordinary Man, a Canadian documentary that premiered at the 2020 Toronto International Film Festival. The film is a portrait of Billy Tipton, the influential jazz musician who was revealed after his death to have been transgender.

== Honors and recognition ==
In 2014, Mac was named to the Trans 100 list for "outstanding contributions to the trans community."

In 2018, after being named a Lambda Literary Writers' Retreat Fellow for Emerging LGBT Voices, it was announced that Mac was writing a young adult novel.
