= Monica Jones (activist) =

American activist

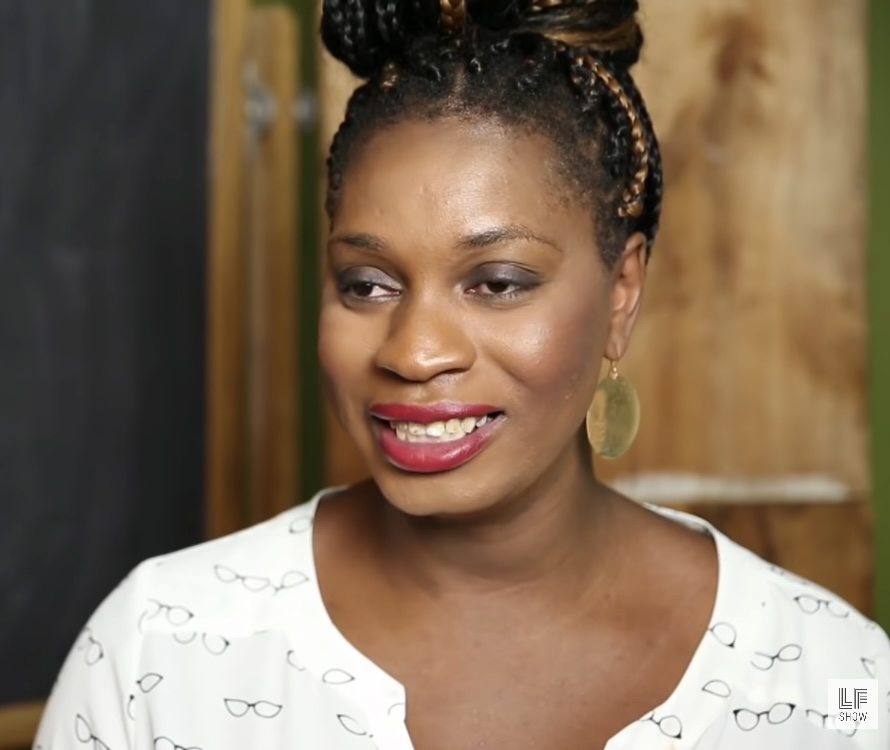
- Jones in 2015
- Education: Arizona State University
- Occupation: Activist

Monica Jones is an African American transgender woman and sex work activist. While a student at Arizona State University, Jones campaigned against Project ROSE, a police sting operation against sex workers, which were aided by the ASU School of Social Work and religious charities.

== Sex work activism ==
One day after attending a protest against the laws enacted under Project ROSE, which allowed police to arrest anyone suspected of "manifesting the intent to prostitute," Jones was arrested under this law by the Phoenix police while walking to a gay bar. Jones was found guilty by the court. The American Civil Liberties Union of Arizona filed an amicus curiae for Jones, arguing that the law is "unconstitutionally vague and overbroad". She fought against the charges for the next two years, while attending the social work program at ASU.

Laverne Cox and Janet Mock joined a campaign against the Phoenix law, which they argue targets transgender women of color, following the conviction of Jones. Cox stated, "All over the country, trans women are targeted simply for being who they are. Laws like this manifestation law really support systematically the idea that girls like me, girls like me and Monica, are less than [others] in this country." Mock tweeted, "Speak against the profiling of [trans woman of color], like Monica Jones."

Jones and her lawyer, Jean-Jacques Cabou, appealed the case and it was dropped in January 2015. The court found that she had had an unfair trial, given that the lower court had allowed evidence of past prostitution convictions in order to discredit her. The law remained on the books after Jones' case was dropped.

In 2016, Jones founded The Outlaw Project, named after Sharmus Outlaw, whom she got to know while fighting against the charges brought against her. According to Jones, The Outlaw Project is "based on the principles of intersectionality to prioritize the leadership of people of color, transgender women, nonbinary people, and migrants for sex worker rights."

=== Australian deportation ===
In November 2014, Jones was detained in Villawood Immigration Detention Centre after the Department of Immigration and Border Protection cancelled her tourist visa at Sydney Airport. Jones had admitted to having offered sexual services while in the country. Although prostitution was legal, Jones was accused of breaching her visa work conditions, which did not entitle her "to engage in any activity that included the sale of goods and services to the general public." Jones was taken to court and made a bid to stay, and lost. She agreed to voluntarily leave the country, but planned to challenge Australia's Immigration Department over allegations of procedural unfairness in court. Jones commented that producers for the Australian TV show Border Security "knew details of what Immigration was going to do to me" and that "It was about 30 seconds before the cameras showed up... and tried to get me on their TV show." Jones was asked by an immigration officer, "Are you OK if they continue to film?" when she had already demanded that the TV cameras leave.

== See also ==
- LGBT rights in the United States
