= Surpassing Certainty =

2017 memoir by Janet Mock

Surpassing Certainty: What My Twenties Taught Me
- Author: Janet Mock
- Language: English
- Publisher: Atria
- Pages: 256
- ISBN: 978-1-5011-4579-7

Surpassing Certainty: What My Twenties Taught Me is a 2017 memoir by Janet Mock. Following on her 2014 memoir, Redefining Realness, which described Mock's childhood and adolescence, Surpassing Certainty deals with her early adulthood. It received favorable reviews and was a finalist for the 2018 Lambda Literary Award for Transgender Nonfiction.

== Publication ==
Published June 13, 2017, by the Atria imprint of Simon & Schuster, Surpassing Certainty is Mock's second memoir, following her 2014 New York Times bestseller Redefining Realness. The book's title is an allusion to Audre Lorde, who wrote, "And at last you'll know with surpassing certainty that only one thing is more frightening than speaking your truth. And that is not speaking."

== Content ==
Following on the discussion of her childhood and adolescence in Redefining Realness, in Surpassing Certainty. The story begins sometime before she turns 20 and continues throughout her twenties. Mock describes herself as being at the age where she had a lot of "obsolete rules" to break.

== Reception ==
Surpassing Certainty was a finalist for the 2018 Lambda Literary Award for Transgender Nonfiction.

Writing in The New York Times, Jennifer Finney Boylan described Surpassing Certainty as "position[ing] its story within a larger history of a struggle for human rights. But Mock’s book is also a work of the heart, much of it focusing on the dissolution of her first marriage, and her journey from a Honolulu strip club to an editor at People magazine." Cosmopolitan said the book "should be required reading for your 20s." Elle named to a list of three "must-read" books for June 2017.
