= Redefining Realness =

2014 memoir by Janet Mock

Redefining Realness: My Path to Womanhood, Identity, Love & So Much More
- Author: Janet Mock
- Language: English
- Genre: Memoir
- Published: 2014
- Publication place: United States
- Pages: 263
- ISBN: 978-1476709123
- OCLC: 852226339
- Dewey Decimal: 306.76/8
- LC Class: HQ77.8.M63 A3 2014

Redefining Realness: My Path to Womanhood, Identity, Love & So Much More is a memoir and the debut book by Janet Mock, an American writer and transgender activist. The memoir follows Mock's journey as a transgender girl and young woman in Hawaii.

The memoir was published on 1 February 2014 by Atria Books. It has been praised by Melissa Harris-Perry, bell hooks, Laverne Cox, and Barbara Smith. It debuted in 19th position on The New York Times Best Seller list for Hardcover Nonfiction and was a finalist for the Lambda Literary Award for Transgender Nonfiction. The book's original title was Fish Food. Mock published a followup memoir, Surpassing Certainty, in 2017.

== Summary ==
In Redefining Realness, Mock describes her life as a transgender woman from childhood to adulthood. Mock opens the book with a scene from 2009, where she starts to tell her boyfriend Aaron that she is transgender and then starts telling her story from childhood.

=== Part One ===
In 1989, as children, Mock's friend and neighbor Marylin dares Mock to take her grandmother's dress down from the clothesline and put it on. After being caught, Mock is scolded by her grandmother and mother for wearing a dress. At four years old, Mock discovers that her father is cheating on her mother. Her parents eventually split up and at age seven Mock is sent to live with her father and brother, Chad, in Oakland, California. While there, her father tries to instill masculinity into young Mock, pushing her to participate in sports and other activities that her brother enjoys.

Mock's father gets a new girlfriend, and that girlfriend's son, a boy much older than Mock, molests her.

In 1992, Mock discovers her father smoking crack cocaine in her bedroom. At this moment she loses respect for her father. In 1994, Mock's father moves the three of them to Dallas, where the father's family lives. While in Dallas, Mock begins participating in more feminine activities with her aunts. When her father moves them into an apartment with his new girlfriend, Denise, Mock connects with her daughter, Makayla. Mock adopts a pseudonym, Keisha, and chats with boyfriends Makayla is no longer interested with over the phone as Keisha. Once, while at her aunt's apartment, one of the boys she had been meeting up with as Keisha comes looking for her. After the boy addresses Mock as Keisha in front of her father, Mock's father cuts her hair short to make her more masculine. Mock's mother eventually decides to bring Mock and her brother Chad back to Hawaii to live with her.

=== Part Two ===
Mock, Chad, and their younger brother Jeff lived with their older sister Cori and her children. While in school in Hawaii, Mock meets Wendi, another transgender girl. Through her friendship with Wendi, Mock becomes more confident, dresses more feminine, and has access to estrogen pills. At age thirteen, Mock comes out as gay to her mother, and Wendi helps her become even more feminine. Together, they meet other transgender women and drag queens.

Mock's mother gets back together with Cori's father, her boyfriend from high school, named Rick. Mock attends Moanalua High School, a rigorous school. She joins the volleyball team, and becomes more confident in her femininity. She continues to meet up with Wendi, who develops a passion for makeup.

=== Part Three ===
Mock becomes class treasurer at Moanalua. After taking estrogen in secret, she talks to her family to come out as a woman and ask to be called Janet. She repeatedly gets sent home from school for breaking the dress code by wearing skirts. She graduates from estrogen pills to shots, which she pays for in cash. She meets a boy named Adrian, who shows interest in her but rejects her when he discovers she is transgender.

After Rick gets arrested, Mock and her brothers, mother, and Rick move into a hotel room. After hanging around with Wendi and other transgender women, Mock enters the sex industry. She makes enough money that she can pay for her own hormone therapy. Later, Rick gets arrested again, and Mock's mother moves back in with Cori. Because of the transphobia she faces at Moanalua, Mock transfers to Farrington, the school where her brother and Wendi attend. At Farrington, there is a Teen Center and a transgender support group called Chrysalis that provides resources to transgender girls. Mock comes out to her father via a letter. Mock decides she wants to undergo genital reconstructive surgery and gets an after-school job at a clothing store to save money. Mock receives a scholarship to the University of Hawai'i at Manoa. She schedules a date for a GRS procedure in Thailand for December 20, 2001.

Mock continues to work in the sex trade on Merchant Street with strict rules on what acts she will perform and for whom. She starts college at the University of Hawai'i. When she pays her mother $120 for their electric bill, her mother and Chad realize how she is getting the money but say nothing. As adults, Chad tells Mock how worried he was for her. Mock is picked up on Merchant Street by a man in a van, someone she would never agree to be with under normal circumstances, but he offers her so much money, and it is so close to her GRS date, that she gets into his van. The man steals her purse and, when the other women on the street help her call the police, the officers are unhelpful. She calls a regular, Sam, to come pick her up and let her sleep in his apartment for the night. Sam offers to pay for her GRS, Mock declines, but asks him about the nude modeling her photographs for.

Mock poses for a photographer, Felix, in lingerie. This is, she says, the decision she regrets most. She gets $1500 for two modeling sessions.

Mock goes to Bangkok, Thailand, for GRS. Dr. R. and Dr. C. perform the surgery. In recovery, Mock meets an older transgender Australian woman, Genie. Mock returns to Hawaii on December 28 and her mother embraces her tearfully. While Mock recovers, her mother takes care of her. Mock accepts her mother's faults and the family is loving.

==== 2009 ====
Returning to 2009, having told her story to Aaron, Mock waits for a reaction. Their relationship is inconsistent for a while, and Mock makes a new friend in Mia, the woman who hired her for a People magazine job. Mock comes out to Mia as transgender. After eight months of no contact from Aaron, he comes to her apartment in the middle of the night. They reconcile, and move in together soon after. The book ends with a discussion of LGBT representation in the media and the perception that transgender women need to be out and visible at all times.

== Development and publication ==
=== Influences ===
Zora Neale Hurston's Their Eyes Were Watching God was a significant influence in Mock's writing of Redefining Realness. Their Eyes Were Watching God was an important book in Mock's girlhood because it was a book about Black women, identity, and love. Other Black female authors that were formative for Mock and her development of Redefining Realness were Toni Morrison, Alice Walker, Maya Angelou, and Audre Lorde. References to Their Eyes Were Watching God appear throughout the book. She also includes quotes from Ralph Ellsion, Gloria Anzaldua, and James Baldwin.

In a review by David B. Green Jr., Redefining Realness was stated to do more than just tell a personal story as it builds from the tradition of earlier women of color writers, such as those Mock references in the memoir. Green states that Mock's memoir relates to women of all kinds, not just transgender women of color.

=== Storygiving campaign ===
On Christmas Eve 2013, Mock launched the Redefining Realness Storygiving Campaign. The campaign fulfilled 127 book requests from people who wished to read Redefining Realness but had financial constraints.

=== Redefining Realness video series ===
On 30 January 2014, Mock posted a series of six videos on her YouTube channel discussing topics covered in her memoir. She talks about growing up while transgender, having to take care of herself because her parents did not, and hoping that her book will reach other young transgender girls. She discusses coming out, as both transgender and a sex worker, which she says is a big theme of her book. She shares about her experience in the sex industry, how she worked in other jobs but sex work gave quick earnings and a tight-knit community, and how sex work is complex. In talking about popular culture, Mock says that Beyoncé, Aaliyah, and Janet Jackson influenced her growing up. Pop culture references appear throughout Redefining Realness, as well as references to many different types of media. Passing, Mock says, implies that transgender people are not actually the gender their identify as; she is not passing as a woman, she is a woman. In the last video, Mock discusses reading at the library as a child, how stories about women who inspired her impacted her growing up, and how her book might be the same for young girls now.

== Reception ==
Mock has said that she wrote Redefining Realness for transgender girls of color, particularly, her own childhood self. However, many cisgender women of color have connected to themes and moments in the memoir.

Redefining Realness is praised for being one of a small number of literary texts written by transgender people of color, especially ones that feature themes of reading. Redefining Realness has also been praised for its complexity in representation of transgender people of color and for combining Western and African structures of autobiography.

A 2014 review of the book claims that while Mock's memoir is personal, it reaches across the queer, transgender, and female communities to relate to many people.

In the paper "Redefining Realness?: On Janet Mock, Laverne Cox, TS Madison, and the Representation of Transgender Women of Color in Media", scholar Julian Kevon Glover complicates the popular reception of Redefining Realness. Glover states that Mock's memoir has gained such high esteem because Mock's transition journey reflects traditional heteronormative norms, beauty standards, and respectability politics. Glover states that many transgender women who do not uphold heteronormative ideals rarely get as much media prestige. While the popularity of Redefining Realness is significant for representation of transgender women, Glover states, many transgender activists are denied media presence because their bodies or actions are not in line with respectability politics.

Mock published a second memoir, Surpassing Certainty: What My Twenties Taught Me, which covers her twenties, a period not much discussed in Redefining Realness.

Raquel Willis, author of The Risk it Takes to Bloom: On Life and Liberation, cited Redefining Realness and Surpassing Certainty as some of her influences and named Mock as an "amazing trans icon". Writer Kuchenga Shenjé said Redefining Realness was the first book whose narrative closely spoke to her own experience, elaborating: "here was a woman whose life experiences echoed mine with such accuracy that ever since I have seen us as Cinderella-Sisters-In-Arms: Black trans girls society failed to crush".

== Awards ==
Redefining Realness was a finalist for the 2015 Lambda Literary Award for Transgender Nonfiction.
