= Original Plumbing =

Quarterly magazine focused on the culture and lifestyle of transgender men

- Spring 2011 cover
- Editors-in-chief: Amos Mac, Rocco Kayiatos
- Photographer: Amos Mac
- Frequency: Quarterly, Biannual
- First issue: September 2009
- Final issue: 2019
- Country: United States
- Based in: Los Angeles, California
- Website: originalplumbing.com
- ISSN: 2153-6341
- OCLC: 535650207

Original Plumbing, also known as OP, was a quarterly magazine focused on "the culture and lifestyle of transgender men." The magazine was started in September 2009 in the San Francisco Bay Area, by editors-in-chief Amos Mac and Rocco Kayiatos. The magazine was later published and distributed from both Brooklyn, New York, and later Los Angeles, California. Mac and Kayiatos created Original Plumbing to bring visibility to the trans male community. At the time of the magazine's conception, trans men received little to no representation on TV, in mainstream film, or in other “LGB”-focused magazines. It is the aim of Original Plumbing to represent "true diversity in the female-to-male (FTM) trans community; in size, age, body, surgery, hormone use and non-use." Original Plumbing is the first magazine for trans men made by trans men. Original Plumbing's first issue, with the theme “Bedroom,” sold out before it was even published in 2009 — but Mac and Kayiatos were still unsure how their magazine would fare when they started. According to Kayiatos, "When Amos and I started, we didn’t know how this would go over. In general, OP was a pretty blessed and magical experience. We set all of our intentions for the first year, things both grandiose and achievable. Everything came to fruition. It felt like we were doing what we were supposed to do."

Mac and Kayiatos decided early on the magazine would have a limited run of 20 issues. The final issue of Original Plumbing was released in 2019, followed shortly after by the release of an anthologized "best of" book, published by Feminist Press.

== Meaning ==
The magazine's name refers to the term "original plumbing" as used by transgender people in Craigslist personal ads to indicate they have not had sex reassignment surgery. According to Mac, "It is our belief that surgery and hormones don’t necessarily make the man… It’s more than just that. Maybe it’s an attitude, a swagger, a limp wrist, or just an awareness of ones self. Needless to say, there is not just one way to be a trans man."

== Content ==
Original Plumbing's content includes advice, essays, interviews, and erotic/pornographic stories and photographs. OP was influenced by teen magazine aesthetics, vintage physique pictorials, and magazines like BUTT, Straight To Hell, and Physique Pictorial. As founding editor and creative director of this project, Mac has photographed the majority of the content within Original Plumbing. Each issue is theme based and limited edition. The magazine is 8" x 10.5" when opened, with a page count of between 52 and 96 pages.

== Issues ==
- No. 01 The Bedroom Issue
- No. 02 The Hair Issue
- No. 03 The Health and Safer Sex Issue
- No. 04 The Workin' Stiff Issue
- No. 05 The Fashion Issue
- No. 06 The Schooled Issure
- No. 07 The Green Issue
- No. 08 The Family Issue
- No. 09 The Entertainment Issue
- No. 10 The Jock Issue
- No. 11 The Hero Issue
- No. 12 The Party Issue
- No. 13 The Atlanta Issue
- No. 14 The Board Stiff Issue
- No. 15 The Selfie Issue
- No. 16 The Lit Issue
- No. 17 The Tattoo Issue
- No. 18 The Bathroom Issue
- No. 19 The Art Issue
- No. 20 The Issues Issue

== Book ==
The Original Plumbing anthology, featuring the best of all 20 issues, was published in 2019 by Feminist Press.
