= Come Out =

Come Out may refer to:

- Coming out, an LGBTQ person's self-disclosure of their sexual orientation, romantic orientation, or gender identity
- Come Out (Reich), a 1966 composition by Steve Reich
- Come Out!, an American LGBTQ newspaper
- "Come Out", a song by Camper Van Beethoven from the 2004 album New Roman Times
- Come Out Festival, an arts festival in Adelaide, South Australia

== See also ==
- Come Out Come Out, a 1995 album by Cub
- Coming out (disambiguation)
