= Sharmus Outlaw =

Transgender rights advocate (d. 2016)

- Born: Kinston, North Carolina, US
- Died: July 7, 2016; Arlington County, Virginia, US

Sharmus Outlaw (1964 or 1965 - July 7, 2016) was an American advocate for transgender rights, sex workers' rights, and HIV patient rights.

Until her death, she was a policy advocate at the Best Practices Policy Project, where her primary work focused on the rights of transgender communities and their health care access. She was also the U.S. representative for the Programme Advisory Committee of the Red Umbrella Fund. She was the founder of Different Avenues, a grassroots organization working with people in the streets and other informational economies in the District of Columbia.

== Early life ==
Outlaw was born in Kinston, North Carolina to mother Aura Lee. She moved to the Washington, D.C. area in 1984, where she then lived permanently.

== Activism ==
In 2001, Outlaw was a founding member of Different Avenues, a Washington, D.C. based organization which conducted outreach to individuals in the street economy.

In 2008, Outlaw advocated to end the criminalization of sex work in Washington, D.C.

=== Desiree Alliance ===
In 2006, Outlaw attended the first Desiree Alliance Conference, a symposium that advocates policy changes for sex workers. Four years later, she collaborated with another advocate for sex worker Cris Sardina to transform Desiree Alliance Conference to a nonprofit organization, where Outlaw served as a co-coordinator until she left in 2015.

=== Program Advisory Committee of the Red Umbrella Fund ===
Outlaw served as the U.S. representative for the Program Advisory Committee of the Red Umbrella Fund, which is an Amsterdam-based fund that assists sex workers rights organizations on a global scale. A statement released by the Best Practices described Outlaw as, “an internationally known activist [who] spoke out against injustice in all settings, from interactions with police in the streets to meetings with the U.S. government to high-level U.N. gatherings.”

== Death ==
Outlaw first became concerned about her health in April 2015, when she visited the ER due to "persistent pressure in her ear". She was told she had an ear infection. Outlaw continued to seek care over the next six months for symptoms, but she was not diagnosed with anything. In November 2015, doctors told Outlaw she had a tumor growing in her neck, which required a biopsy; however, Outlaw's insurance did not cover the procedure, and she was unable to get Medicaid. The following month, Outlaw returned to an emergency room, demanding a biopsy. The procedure revealed she had a "highly aggressive form of lymphoma".

Outlaw began receiving chemotherapy, and later discovered that her Medicaid paperwork had been delayed due to confusion about the gender marker.

For the last few weeks of her life, Outlaw was sick, but even after receiving treatment, she would continue to go to events and conferences to advocate. On July 7, 2016, Outlaw died at the Capital Caring Hospice Center in Falls Church, Virginia.

== Legacy ==
Outlaw's legacy continues throughout the Sharmus Outlaw Advocacy and Rights Institute (SOAR Institute). The goal of this institute is to create policy change for sex workers through legislation, provide legal and social service consultation, and bring attention to human trafficking. There is also the Sharmus Outlaw Scholarship, which is granted exclusively to incarcerated black transgender women.

== Awards and publications ==
In 2009, Outlaw won The Port in the Storm Award by the Washington Peace Center for her work with HIPS. She also was the co-author for the piece Resisting Through Resilience: US Transgender and Sex Worker-Led Community Based Research, published in 2015. She also co-wrote Nothing About Us Without Us, also published in 2015. In 2016, Outlaw was recognized as one of Plus Magazine's top 16 HIV-positive people of 2016. They wrote that she was an activist that helped from a peer position.
