= TransLatina Coalition =

American transgender advocacy group

The TransLatin@ Coalition
- Abbreviation: TLC
- Formation: 2009; 17 years ago
- Founder: Bamby Salcedo
- Type: Nonprofit advocacy organization
- Purpose: transgender rights
- Headquarters: Los Angeles, CA, United States
- President & CEO: Bamby Salcedo
- Vice President & COO: Maria Roman
- Affiliations: The TransLatin@ Coalition Institute
- Website: www.translatinacoalition.org

The TransLatina Coalition, stylized as the TransLatin@ Coalition, is an American advocacy group that works on behalf of transgender Latina women who are immigrants to the United States. Based in Los Angeles, it has seven organized chapters and staff around the United States and in Mexico City.

== History ==
The TransLatina Coalition began as a radical grassroots organization, founded by Bamby Salcedo and formed in collaboration with other trans activists and leaders in 2009.

On Feb. 1, 2017, the organization was able to open the Center for Violence Prevention and Transgender Wellness. The center's opening was funded through a $1 million annual grant from the L.A. County Department of Public Health, with funds allocated to span between three and five years. It was also made possible through further funding from the Elton John AIDS Foundation and partnerships with APAIT (Asian Pacific AIDS Intervention Team), Bienestar, the Los Angeles Children's Hospital, Friends Community Center, and the Los Angeles LGBT Center. The same year, the City of Los Angeles Workforce Investment Board sponsored the coalition's trans workforce assessment as well as their workforce development innovation program. The city body had previously allotted, through their AB 1111: Breaking Barriers to Employment Initiative Grant Program, a grant of $249,745.50 toward the TransLatina Coalition and the Los Angeles LGBT Center to boost employment services created for trans people in need. In June 2017, the TransLatina Coalition once again became a grant recipient of the Arcus Foundation, whose selections would give special focus to "creating a response to conservative religious voices and anti-LGBT discrimination, with a particular focus on the continent of Africa."

In 2019, Gilead Sciences selected the TransLatina Coalition as one of 15 transgender advocacy organizations among which it would distribute its TRANScend™ Community Impact Fund, a $4.5 million donation. The funds, a direct service grant, was a $100,000 grant to benefit the TransLatina Coalition's Helping Our People Evolve (HOPE) Housing Program, a transitional housing program which intersects with the objective of HIV prevention. In November 2019, the coalition was honored as a Gender Justice Champion at Celebrating Our Power, a gala hosted by The Women's Foundation of California, at which Los Angeles Mayor Eric Garcetti deliver one of two keynote addresses.

The organization hosts the annual GARRAS Fashion Show, a fundraiser, which highlights the contributions that trans and trans allies make to the fashion, business, and leadership communities. In 2016, the show generated $10,000 which enable the coalition to launch their daily meal distribution program. In 2017, the show raised $60,000, which enabled the organization to hire their director of programs and expand their food distribution program. In 2018 alone, the show generated $120,000, enabling the coalition to launch their transitional housing program.

== Activism ==
The organization deems its work "activism in action". This has included unfurling a transgender rights banner at the 2018 World Series; facilitating a week-long protest and year-long campaign, along with the National Immigrant Justice Center, to pressure ICE to free a trans Salvadoran asylum-seeker named Alejandra Barrera from Cibola Detention Facility, where she had been unduly held for almost two years; participating in the Transgender Law Center's #FreeNicoll, a campaign to release Guatemalan asylum-seeker Nicoll Hernández-Polanco from undue detention in an all-male facility; representing the trans community at the Women's March in Washington, D.C; lobbying the media for accurate coverage of transgender stories; and protesting against violence toward trans people. staging die-ins, In 2019, the coalition engaged in direct activism in partnership with the Transgender Resource Center of New Mexico "to help connect individuals to legal advice and social services while in detention, and coordinate post-release assistance, including housing, hot meals, transportation, and clothing."

== Awards and honors ==
- Repeat grantee of the Elton John AIDS Foundation
- Repeat grantee of the Arcus Foundation
- Grantee of Borealis Philanthropy
- Grantee of Gilead Sciences
- Grantee of the Los Angeles County Department of Public Health
- Grantee of the City of Los Angeles Workforce Investment Board
