= Coming Out (2015 film) =

2015 documentary film

- Directed by: Alden Peters
- Written by: Megan Mancini, Alden Peters
- Distributed by: Wolfe Releasing
- Release date: September 10, 2015
- Running time: 70 minutes
- Country: United States
- Language: English

Coming Out is a 2015 American documentary film directed by Alden Peters. It follows Peters while he comes out as a gay man to multiple people, including his parents, siblings, and friends. Peters also interviews experts, including activist Janet Mock, psychologist Ritch Savin-Williams, and journalist Zach Stafford, to provide broader context about the experience of coming out.

The documentary premiered on September 10, 2015, at the DOCUTAH film festival, where it won the "Audience Favorite" award. The following month it was shown at the MiFo LGBT Film Festival in Fort Lauderdale, Florida, and at the New York Lesbian, Gay, Bisexual, & Transgender Film Festival (NewFest). It won the Best Documentary award at Festival MIX Milano in 2016, and also appeared that year at the Queer Lisboa International Queer Film Festival. It was released on DVD and iTunes in October 2016.
