= Shane Ortega =

Retired Army Staff Sergeant and Marine Corps veteran

Shane Ortega is a retired Army Staff Sergeant and Marine Corps veteran. Ortega was stationed at Wheeler Airfield in Oahu, Hawaii in the 3-25th Combat Aviation Division of the Army's 25th Infantry Division. He was a member of the Gay Men's Chorus of Honolulu and competed at the professional level of bodybuilding, placing fourth in Fall 2015.

== Life ==
Retired Army Staff Sergeant Ortega served three duty tours: two in Iraq with the USMC as a woman, and one in Afghanistan with the Army as a man. He had served as a team and squad leader, a flight engineer, and a machine gunner.

Ortega executed over 400 combat missions in Iraq and Afghanistan, "and fought side-by-side in foxholes and remote operating bases." Ortega noted that in a combat zone, his gender identity made little difference, as he was expected to carry his own equipment and do his job—lives counted on it. Military regulations used to deem "any proclamation of a transgender identity or gender-affirming clinical treatment to be evidence of a mental illness that makes one unfit to serve" according to The Advocate. Evaluated by an Army doctor, Ortega was determined to be free of gender dysphoria and deemed fit to serve.

Beginning in 2008, Ortega advocated for LGBT rights. He co-founded support organizations and lobbied with legislators, often using his open own personal experiences and performance record to help advance the cause for transgender and LGBT service members. In championing the repeal of "Don't ask, don't tell" (DADT), equal opportunity protections for LGBT members, acceptance of women in combat roles, and lifting the ban on transgender military service, he worked with the military chain of command and the ACLU.
