= Bamby Salcedo =

Mexican American transgender activist (born 1969)

- Born: October 12, 1969 (age 57); Guadalajara, Mexico
- Occupation: Activist
- Organization: TransLatin@ Coalition
- Movement: Transgender rights
- Awards: The West Coast Liberty Award; Susan J. Hyde Award
- Website: https://bambysalcedo.com/

Bamby Salcedo (born October 12, 1969) is a Mexican American transgender rights activist. She is the founder of the Los Angeles-based TransLatin@ Coalition.

== Early life and education ==
Salcedo was born at El Hospital Civil de Guadalajara in Guadalajara, Mexico on October 12, 1969. As a child, Salcedo experienced abuse and stigmatization at the hands of her stepfather, and was brought up in poverty alongside her two siblings. Salcedo bears the first name of her late father, who left home shortly before her birth.

In her early life, Salcedo was connected to criminal street gangs and drugs. At the age of twelve, she was arrested and sent to a rehabilitation facility for minors. After coming out, she befriended a group of young homosexual Mexicans, with whom she joined the Menudo Fan Club. Salcedo would later join El Grupo Orgullo Homosexual de Liberación (GOHL), which provided sexual health education and contraceptives.

Salcedo immigrated illegally to the United States in 1985 at the age of 16, crossing the border through Tijuana, following her release from a juvenile recovery center. She and her uncle arrived together in Los Angeles, then stayed with her father in Visalia, California. She was next to live with her father's cousins in Gridley, California, where she began working in a tortilla factory and struggled with drug addiction. She was granted a work permit under the Immigration Reform and Control Act of 1986, but it was revoked after numerous arrests and deportations. She was then placed in an immigrant detention center while awaiting an asylum hearing, where she faced harassment from other inmates for her gender identity. Soon after, she came to learn that she was HIV+, and felt both victimized and helpless.

Salcedo eventually became a citizen, relocated to Los Angeles at eighteen years old, and underwent substance abuse treatment. Arrested again in 1998, she was sent to a men's prison for a drug crime, before being deported back to Mexico in 2001. She once again immigrated illegally to the United States and accepted an opening in an American rehabilitation center. Salcedo received her associate's degree from a community college, then transferred to California State University, Los Angeles, where she received her bachelor's degree with a minor in Women and Gender Studies. She then pursued a master's degree in Mexican and Latin American Studies from the university.

== Career ==
=== TransLatin@ Coalition ===
In 2009, Bamby Salcedo initiated her acclaimed TransLatin@ Coalition in collaboration with a group of transgender, gender non-conforming and intersex (TGI) immigrant women. The Coalition focuses on key issues relating to U.S. identity documents & and immigration, education, employment, health care, and experiences of interpersonal and structural violence. Bamby quit her paying job as a coordinator for the transgender program for Children's Hospital Los Angeles in 2015 to fully devote her time to the organization. Her and her partners received their first grant for funding for the program in 2016 from the Elton John AIDS Foundation and were able to hire case managers to assist in connecting immigrant trans women released from detention centers with any necessary services.

In 2018, TransLatin@ Coalition was joined beside Laverne Cox in the Los Angeles rally for the #FamiliesBelongTogether National Day of Action. Bamby Salcedo was also known to organize events to raise funds for the TransLatin@ coalition. She organized an event in 2014 called GARRAS (Groundbreaking Activism Redirecting and Reforming All Systems) in which trans Latinas would model for a fashion show. This fashion show alluded to a double meaning since "Garras" was used in the statement "garras que te pones" and the "grrr" alluded to the level of fierceness these women possessed.

=== Angels of Change ===
Bamby Salcedo collaborated with The Center for TransYouth Health and Development, and the Children's Hospital Los Angeles Division of Adolescent and Young Adult Medicine to produce the annual "Angels of Change Runway Show" and calendar, which started in 2017. She created this, as cited in her website, to create “an opportunity for trans and gender non-conforming youth to develop self-presentation skills in a safe, fun environment by participating in […] the world’s first calendar featuring trans youth.”

As a result of her work with the trans community, Bamby Salcedo has been recognized by both the state and federal governments on a number of occasions. In 2015, Salcedo spoke at The White House as part of the White House United State of Women Summit. In 2023, she was appointed Vice Chair for the Commission on the State of Hate by California Governor Gavin Newsom.

== In popular culture ==
Los Angeles-based filmmaker Dante Alencastre made the 2013 documentary Transvisible, which covers the life of Salcedo and the challenges that she faced. It discusses how she became a role model for “multiple communities including the Trans, Latina, immigrant, youth, and LGBT communities.”

Directed by filmmaker and photographer Timothy Greenfield-Sanders, Salcedo was featured as one of eleven transgender Americans and activists who starred in the 2016 HBO documentary The Trans List. Salcedo discusses her experiences as a transgender immigrant alongside American transgender figures such as Laverne Cox and Caitlyn Jenner.

In 2021, director Pedro Peira suggested making a documentary collaboration with Bamby Salcedo to celebrate her fiftieth birthday. The 2021 film, LA Queenciañera, follows Bamby “organizing her 50th birthday celebration attended by people significant to her life and survival. As she prepares for the event, Bamby travels through LA county and watches her life go by; from the streets where she smoked crack and the Men’s County Jail to journalists and academics she has enlisted for her causes, plush homes of supporters, and communities and organizations she has gathered together to change the lives of transgender people in the United States.”

== Awards ==
- James Earl Hardy Legends Award, The Black & Hispanic Gay Coalition
- The West Coast Liberty Awards, Lambda Legal
- Susan J. Hyde Award for 'Longevity in the Movement' from The National LGBTQ Task Force
- Good Neighbor Award, State Farm Insurance
- Connie Norman Leadership Award, LA PRIDE
- Shiela J. Kuehl Trailblazer Award, Stonewall Democratic Club
- The Women in Leadership Award, City of West Hollywood
- Virginia Uribe Leadership Award, The Models of Pride Youth Conference
- The Sol Award, National Latin@ AIDS Awareness Day (NLAAD)
