= John James =

John James may refer to:

== Entertainment ==
- John Wells James (1873–1951), American artist
- John James (writer) (1923–1993), British writer of historical novels
- John James (British poet) (1939–2018), British poet
- John James (guitarist) (born 1947), Welsh fingerstyle guitarist
- John James (actor) (born 1956), American television actor
- John James (American poet) (born 1987)
- John James (Canadian musician) (active 1980s–2016), Canadian dance musician
- John James (active 1986–1997), Australian musician formerly associated with the band Newsboys

== Politics ==
- John James (MP for Wallingford), 1364–1378, Member of Parliament (MP) for Wallingford
- John James (MP for Weymouth)
- John James (14th-century MP), MP for Melcombe Regis
- John James (died 1601), MP for St Ives and Newcastle-under-Lyme
- John James (Parliamentarian) (died 1681), English politician who sat in the House of Commons in 1653 for Worcestershire
- John James (died 1718), MP for Brackley
- Sir John James, 1st Baronet (1784–1869), Dublin wine merchant and Lord Mayor of Dublin
- John H. James (mayor) (1830–1917), mayor of Atlanta
- John M. James (fl. 1867–1869), California State Assembly
- John James (Canadian politician) (1911–1999), Canadian Member of Parliament
- John James (Michigan politician) (born 1981), Michigan politician
- John S. James, American LGBT rights activist

== Religion ==
- John Angell James (1785–1859), English Nonconformist clergyman and writer
- John James (archdeacon of the Seychelles)
- John James (archdeacon of Llandaff) (died 1938)
- Thomas James (bishop) (John Thomas James, 1786–1828), Church of England bishop of Calcutta, 1827–1828

== Sports ==
- John James (American football) (born 1949), former American professional football player and punter
- John James (Australian rules footballer) (1934–2010), leading Australian rules footballer in the Victorian Football League (VFL)
- John James (footballer, born 1934) (born 1934), English football inside forward for Birmingham and Torquay
- John James (footballer, born 1948) (1948–2021), English football striker for Port Vale, Chester, Tranmere and Chicago Sting
- John James (racing driver) (1914–2002), British racing driver
- John James (rower) (1937–2024), British rower and Olympic medallist
- John James (tennis) (born 1951), Australian tennis player
- John James (administrator), Australian business administrator, CEO of Port Adelaide Football Club
- Johnny James (born 1933), American baseball pitcher

== Other ==
- John James (architect) (c. 1670–1746), English architect
- John James (Australian architect) (born 1931), British-born Australian architect and historian
- John James (pirate) (fl. 1699–1700), pirate active off the American east coast and Madagascar
- John James (Manager of Barbuda) (1774–1826), resident manager of Barbuda in the early 19th century
- John Hough James (1800–1881), American lawyer, banker, railroad builder and stockbreeder
- John H. James (sailor) (1835–1914), American Civil War sailor and Medal of Honor recipient
- John James (Medal of Honor) (1838–1902), American soldier in the Indian Wars
- John Charles Horsey James (1841–1899), magistrate from Western Australia
- John Stanley James (1843–1896), birth name of journalist Julian Thomas
- Arthur James (racehorse owner) (John Arthur James, 1853–1917), British racehorse owner
- J. I. P. James (John Ivor Pulsford James, 1913–2001), British orthopedic surgeon
- John T. James (active since 1989), toxicologist for the National Aeronautics & Space Administration
- John James (businessman and philanthropist), (1906-1996), English businessman and philanthropist

== See also ==
- Jack James (disambiguation)
- James John (1809–1886), founder of the settlement of St. Johns in Oregon
