= Charles Taggart =

Charles Taggart may refer to:

- Charles A. Taggart (1843–1938), Union Army soldier and Medal of Honor recipient
- Charles Ross Taggart (1871–1953), American comedian and folklorist
