= Outwords =

Outwords may refer to:

- OutWords, a Canadian LGBT magazine
- The OUTWORDS Archive, an American nonprofit LGBT archive

== See also ==
- Outward, a fantasy role-playing video game
