= The OUTWORDS Archive =

American LGBTQ+ digital archive organization

The Outwords Archive
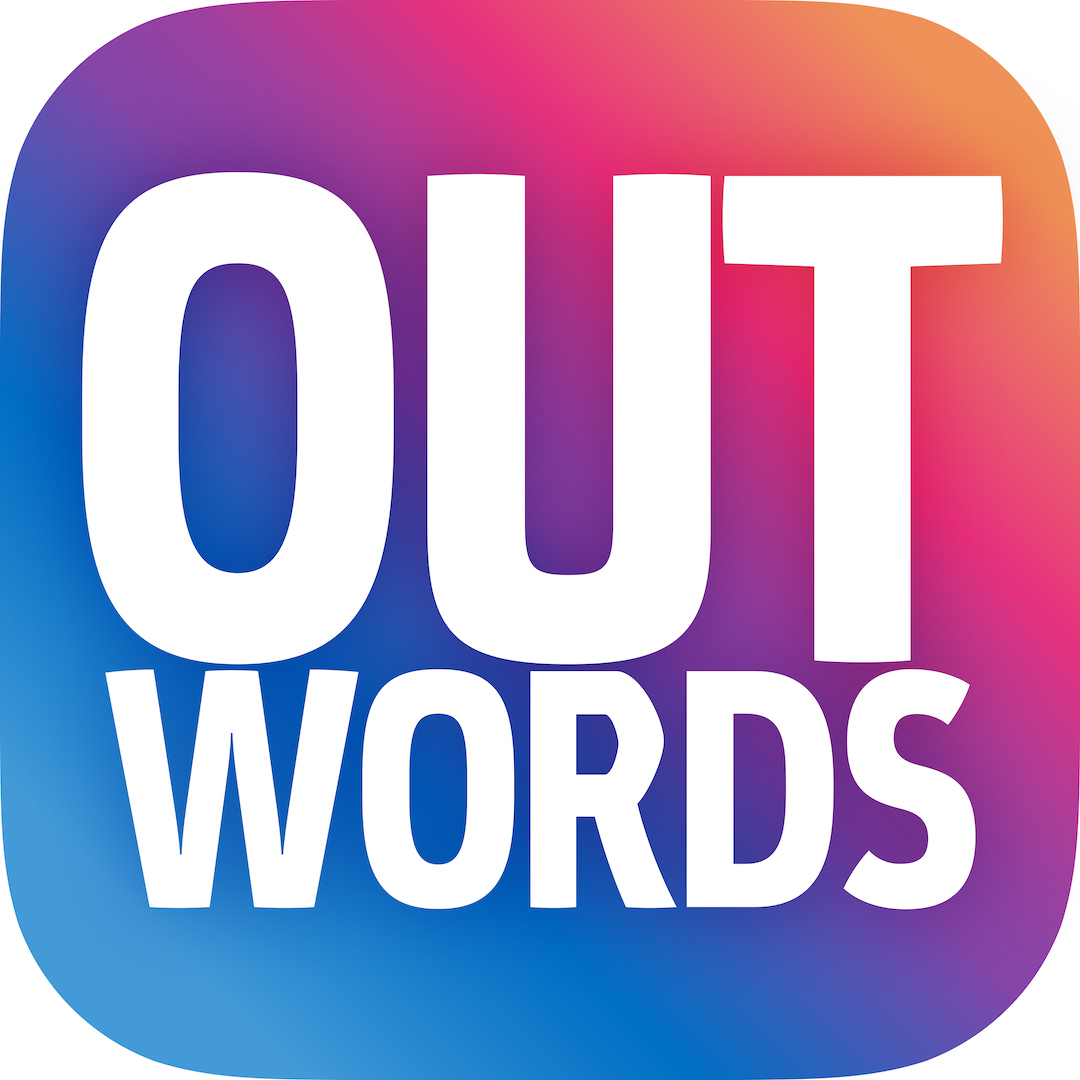
- Formation: 2016; 10 years ago
- Type: NPO
- Legal status: 501(c)(3)
- Purpose: Oral history of the U.S. LGBTQIA+ (lesbian, gay, bisexual, transgender, queer/questioning, intersex, ally, and two spirit) human rights movement
- Headquarters: Los Angeles, United States
- Founder: Mason Funk
- Website: theoutwordsarchive.org

The Outwords Archive (OUTWORDS) records and archives on-camera interviews with elders from the LGBTQ+ community throughout the United States. The archive headquarters are based in Los Angeles, with the entirety of their digital collection provided to the public for free through their official website. The nonprofit's stated mission is to "capture, preserve, and share the stories of LGBTQIA2S+ elders, to build community and catalyze social change."

== History ==
Inspired by the Shoah Foundation's Visual History Archive of interviews with Holocaust witnesses and survivors, documentary TV and film producer Mason Funk established OUTWORDS in 2016. Half-day interviews are conducted on high-definition digital video by film crews, primarily in the homes of interview subjects. Interviewees have included lesbian, gay, bisexual, transgender, two spirit, and intersex individuals, as well as representatives of various sub-communities of the LGBTQ+ community including drag queens, leather daddies, lesbian separatists, and allies. Most interviewees are over 70 years old.

In May 2018, OUTWORDS received a Creator Award in the Community Giver category from the co-working company WeWork. In May 2019, HarperCollins published the first compilation of OUTWORDS interviews, entitled The Book of Pride, to commemorate the 50th anniversary of the Stonewall Riots. At the same time, OUTWORDS released a searchable digital platform which makes video interviews and historical photos freely available to the public.

In June 2023, OUTWORDS opened their first museum exhibit, "Coming Out West: LGBTQ+ Elders Share Their Stories", in collaboration with the Santa Monica History Museum. In 2024, select OUTWORDS interviews were featured in the exhibit, "Hello Auntie, Hello Uncle: Conversations with our Elders", at the Wing Luke Museum and in the permanent digital exhibit, "Hidden Histories: Discovering Los Angeles' LGBTQ+ Collections", curated by the ONE Archives at UCLA.

== Interviews ==
As of August 2024, OUTWORDS had recorded on-camera oral histories with over 350 LGBTQIA2S+ elders in 45 states. Interviewees have included:

- Daayiee Abdullah – openly gay Imam
- Noel Alumit – Filipino actor, author, HIV educator
- Donnie Anderson – transgender Baptist minister
- Roy Ashburn – former anti-LGBT politician
- Eden Atwood – intersex activist, jazz singer
- Arlene Voski Avakian – Armenian American academic
- Byllye Avery – healthcare activist for Black women
- Don Bachardy – portrait artist, longtime partner of Christopher Isherwood
- Bruce Bastian – technology pioneer
- Brett Bigham – 2014 Oregon State Teacher of the Year
- Marci Bowers – gynecologist, first transgender surgeon to specialize in gender-affirming surgery
- Sharon Bridgforth – writer, theater jazz artist
- David Bohnett – GeoCities founder, philanthropist
- Cidny Bullens – transgender singer-songwriter
- Stephanie Byers – first transgender state legislator in Kansas
- David Edward Byrd – graphic artist, illustrator
- Grethe Cammermeyer – retired colonel, DADT activist
- Mandy Carter – civil rights organizer
- Cecilia Chung – transgender community leader, LGBTQ+ activist
- Karen Clark – long-serving lesbian politician in Minnesota
- Sharon Day – Ojibwe leader, Native American activist
- Rochelle Diamond – research biologist, Out to Innovate chair emeritus
- Martin Duberman – playwright, historian, activist
- Elana Dykewomon – lesbian activist, author, teacher
- Denise Eger – first lgbt leader of the Central Conference of American Rabbis
- Susan Talamantes Eggman – California politician in the State Assembly
- Sokari Ekine – Nigerian activist, author, blogger
- Beth Elliott – transgender lesbian folk singer
- Oliva Espín – Cuban refugee and immigrant sexuality researcher
- Lillian Faderman – author, LGBTQ+ history scholar
- Susan Feniger – chef, restaurateur, cookbook author, and radio and TV personality
- L. Frank – Tongva-Ajachmem artist
- Chris Freeman & Jon Ginoli – musicians who formed Pansy Division
- Kenny Fries – disability activist, memoirist, poet
- Phyllis Randolph Frye – first openly transgender judge in US
- Gilberto Gerald – gay rights and HIV/AIDS activist; co-founder of the National Coalition of Black Lesbians and Gays
- Jewelle Gomez – author, former president San Francisco Library Commission
- Ken Gonzales-Day – social justice focused conceptual artist
- Jamison Green – former president of WPATH
- Beverly Greene – clinical psychologist, scholar, author
- Susan Griffin – ecofeminist activist, essayist, playwright
- Miss Major Griffin-Gracy – transgender activist
- Dean Hamer – geneticist, ‘gay gene’ researcher
- Monica Helms – creator of the Transgender Pride Flag
- Ray Hill – organizer, radio host
- Alice Y. Hom – Asian American community activist, author
- Karla Jay – author, activist
- Lorri Jean – CEO of the Los Angeles LGBT Center
- Martin Jenkins – first openly LGBT+ Supreme Court of California Justice
- Janetta Johnson – executive director of the TGI Justice Project
- Lani Ka'ahumanu – bisexual pioneer and author
- Rupert Kinnard – creator of the first lesbian/gay African American cartoon strip
- Victoria Kolakowski – first openly transgender trial court judge of general jurisdiction
- Sheila Kuehl – child TV star, 1st out LGBT+ legislator in CA
- Bo Laurent – intersex activist, founder of the Intersex Society of North America
- Kay Lahusen – pioneering photojournalist
- Dick Leitsch – former president of the Mattachine Society
- Mark Leno – former CA State Senator
- Yoseñio V. Lewis – transgender healthcare activist
- Gail Marquis – basketball player, 1976 Olympic silver medalist, Hall of Famer
- June Millington – Filipina-American songwriter/guitarist, founder of Fanny
- David Mixner – civil rights organizer, playwright
- Nicole Murray-Ramirez – San Diego city committee appointee, Queen Mother of the Imperial Court System
- Nancy Nangeroni – transgender activist, founder of GenderTalk Radio
- Holly Near – singer-songwriter, actress, teacher, activist
- Diana Nyad – open ocean swimmer
- Robyn Ochs – bisexual pioneer and educator
- Torie Osborn – community organizer, political activist
- Shanna Peeples – 2015 National Teacher of the Year
- Troy Perry – founder of the Metropolitan Community Church
- K.C. Potter – academic administrator, led LGBTQ+ group at Vanderbilt
- Jennifer Pritzker – investor, philanthropist, military museum founder
- Margaret Randall – writer, photographer, academic
- Joan Roughgarden – ecologist, evolutionary biologist
- Donna Sachet – drag performer, activist
- Bamby Salcedo – founder of TransLatin@ Coalition
- Alex Sanchez – author of LGBTQ+ books for adults and teens
- Diane Sands – Montana state senator
- Mark Segal – journalist, founder of the National Gay Newspaper Guild
- Ruth Shack – sponsor of the Dade County 1977 Human Rights Ordinance
- Charles Silverstein – mental health activist, author
- Nadine Smith – founder/CEO of Equality Florida
- Alan M. Steinman – retired admiral, DADT activist
- Sandy Stone – pioneering trans recording engineer for Olivia Records
- Susan Stryker – transgender academic, filmmaker, author
- Jewel Thais-Williams – Los Angeles nightclub owner
- Jim Toy – college campus activist
- Jean-Nickolaus Tretter – LGBTQ+ historian
- Kitty Tsui – Chinese-American poet, author, bodybuilder
- Carmen Vázquez – health care activist
- Bruce Vilanch – Emmy-winning comedian
- Del LaGrace Volcano – artist, performer, intersex activist
- amina wadud – Muslim theologian, the “Lady Imam”
- Phill Wilson – Black AIDS Institute founder
- Evan Wolfson – marriage equality activist
- Mia Yamamoto – attorney, transgender activist
- Rick Zbur – CA State Assembly Member

== Publications ==
- The Book of Pride: LGBTQ Heroes Who Changed the World, (HarperCollins, May 2019), ISBN 978-0-0625-7170-0

== See also ==
- LGBT History
- Mattachine Society
- One Institute
- ONE National Gay & Lesbian Archives
- Lesbian Herstory Archives
- Tretter Archives
- Digital Transgender Archive
- Transgender Oral History Project
