= The Book of Pride =

2019 non-fiction book by Mason Funk

The Book of Pride: LGBTQ Heroes Who Changed The World
- First edition
- Author: Mason Funk
- Language: English
- Publisher: HarperCollins
- Publication date: May 2019
- ISBN: 978-0-06-257170-0 Paperback

The Book of Pride: LGBTQ Heroes Who Changed The World is a 2019 book by Mason Funk. It contains interviews and biographies of members of the LGBT community and advocates compiled by The OUTWORDS Archive. It was published by HarperCollins. There is a mix of well-known and unsung heroes of the LGBT movement.

== Interviews ==
- Troy Perry, founder of the Metropolitan Community Church which affirms the lesbian, gay, bisexual, and transgender communities
- Fenton Johnson, writer and professor of English and LGBT Studies
- Evan Wolfson, attorney and gay rights advocate
- Diana Nyad, author, journalist, motivational speaker, and long-distance swimmer
- Dean Hamer, geneticist, author, and filmmaker
- Margarethe Cammermeyer, colonel in the Washington National Guard and became a gay rights activist
- Miss Major Griffin-Gracy, trans woman activist and community leader for transgender rights, with a particular focus on women of color
- Donna Sachet, drag actor, singer, community activist, fundraiser, spokesmodel, and writer
- John S. James, pioneering US LGBT rights activist and the editor of AIDS Treatment News
- Shannon Minter, civil rights attorney and the legal director of the National Center for Lesbian Rights
- Karla Jay, professor and pioneer in the field of lesbian and gay studies
- Gigi Raven Wilbur, bisexual rights activist and writer
- K.C. Potter, Academic dean at Vanderbilt University instrumental in creating a safe place for gay students
- Ada Bello, a founder of the Philadelphia chapter of the Daughters of Bilitis
- Kylar William Broadus, founder the Trans People of Color Coalition in Missouri
- Jewel Thais-Williams, founder of Jewel's Catch One, a black disco opened in 1973
- Alexei Romanoff, organizer of 1966 protests at the Black Cat Bar against police raids
- Phyllis Randolph Frye, creator of the International Conference on Transgender Law and Employment in 1991
- Eric Julber, lawyer who won One, Inc. v. Olesen
- Jim Toy, LGBT activist who initiated the creation of the Lesbian-Gay Male Programs office at the University of Michigan
- Mary Morten, activist and co-creator of The Nia Project: Images of African American Lesbians
- Kay Lahusen, first openly gay American gay photojournalist
- Jamison Green, transgender rights activist and author of Becoming A Visible Man
- Diana Rivers, pioneer of women-only spaces and an organizer of women's conferences and festivals
- Blackberri, singer-songwriter, composer, and HIV activist whose work includes "Beautiful Black Man," which was featured in Looking for Langston
- James Credle, founder of the National Association of Black and White Men Together and the Newark LGBTQ Center
