= Kylar Broadus =

American attorney, entrepreneur, and transgender rights activist

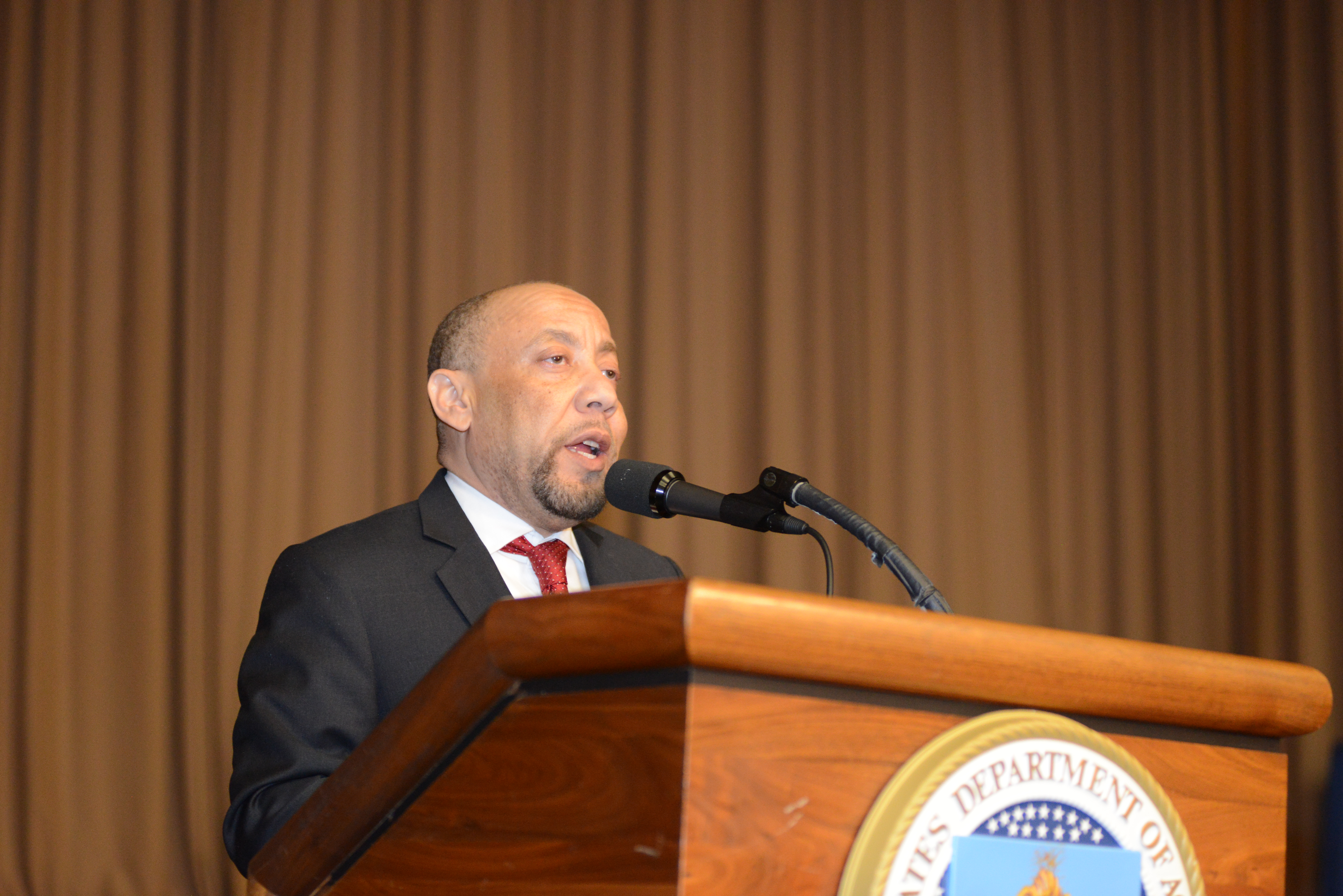
- Born: August 28, 1963 (age 62); Fayette, Missouri, U.S.
- Education: Central Methodist University (BS)
- Organization(s): Freedom for All Americans, Mary's House, the National LGBT Cancer Network, and the National Black Justice Coalition

Kylar William Broadus (born August 28, 1963) is an American attorney, entrepreneur, and trans rights activist. He founded the Trans People of Color Coalition in 2010. In 2012, he became the first trans person to testify in front of the United States Senate when he spoke in support of the Employment Non-Discrimination Act. He was a long-time professor of business law and workplace discrimination at Lincoln University, a historically black college.

== Early life and education ==
Broadus was born August 28, 1963, in Fayette, Missouri to Fannie and William. His parents were the children of enslaved Africans and suffered under the Jim Crow laws in Missouri. He spent most of his life near Columbia, Missouri. Kylar Broadus graduated from Fayette High School and earned a Bachelor of Science in business administration at Central Methodist University.

== Career ==
Broadus worked for a large financial institution in the early 1990s. In 1995, he announced he was going to undergo gender transition. This resulted in Broadus facing a constructive discharge notice in 1997 after facing workplace harassment and discrimination. He was unemployed for a year after and developed posttraumatic stress disorder from the harassment.

For 18 years, Broadus worked in a private law practice in Columbia, Missouri where he represented LGBTQ clients in family and criminal law. He taught business law and workplace discrimination at Lincoln University for nearly 20 years where he served as chair of the business department. Broadus served on the National LGBTQ Task Force as senior public policy counsel. He was the director of the force's Transgender Civil Rights Project. Broadus was the state legislative manager and counsel for the Human Rights Campaign.

From 2007 to 2010, he was board chair of the National Black Justice Coalition. In 2010, Broadus founded the Trans People of Color Coalition. In 2012, Broadus was one of thirteen transgender delegates at the Democratic National Convention. That year, he became the first openly transgender person testify to the United States Senate when he spoke of his support of the Employment Non-Discrimination Act. He was interviewed in The Book of Pride.

He was present next to President Obama during the signing of a 2014 executive order regarding further amendments to Executive Order 11478, Equal Employment Opportunity in the Federal Government, and Executive Order 11246, Equal Employment Opportunity, to protect LGBTQ employees from workplace discrimination.

In 2019, he awarded the Trans Trailblazer Award by the LGBT Bar Association of Los Angeles.

== Personal life ==
Broadus initially came out as lesbian before determining he was a trans man. He moved to Washington, D.C. in 2013.
