= Dayton National Cemetery =

Historic veterans cemetery in Ohio, US

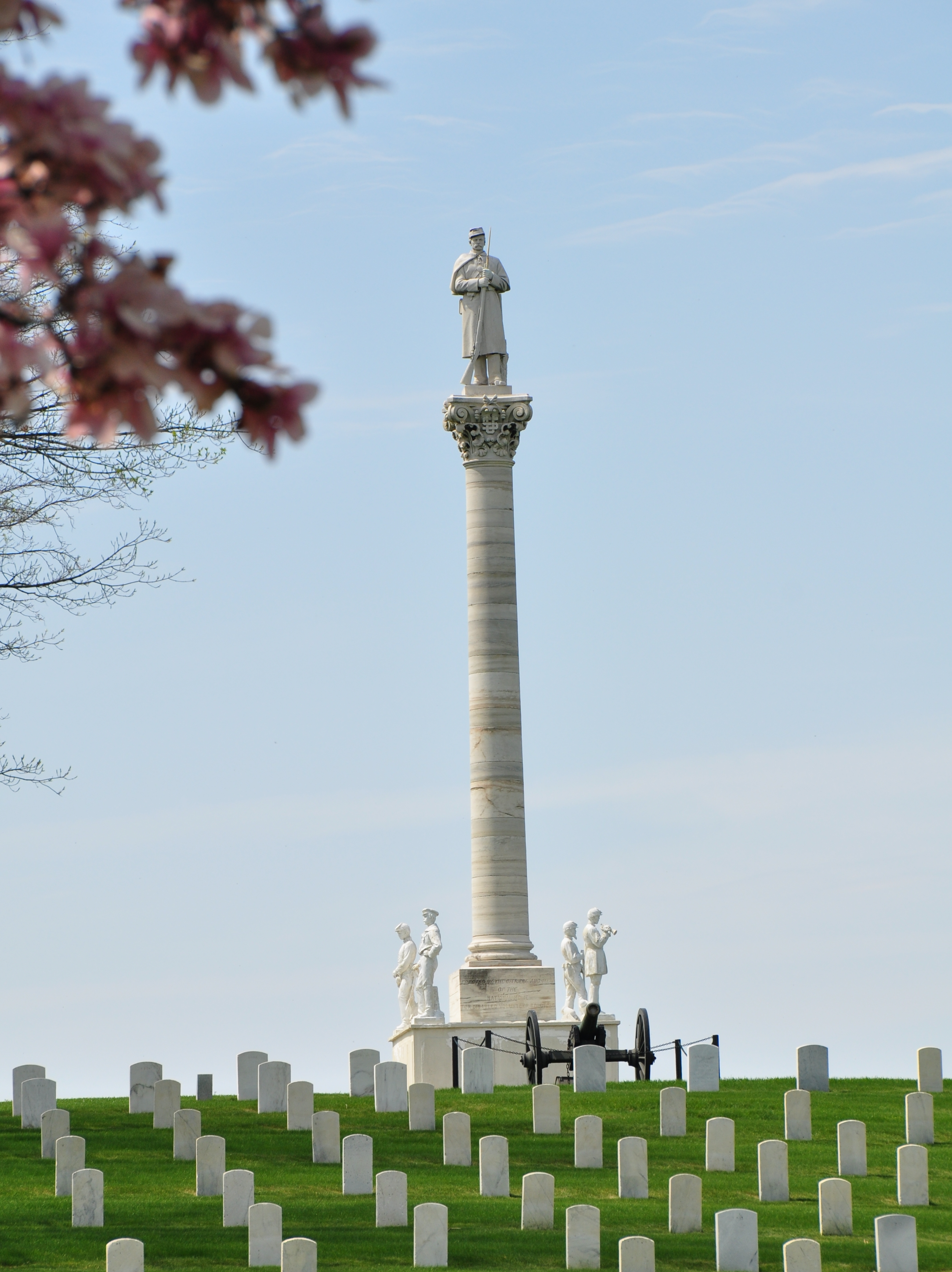
- The Soldiers' Monument at Dayton National Cemetery
- Interactive map of Dayton National Cemetery

Details
- Established: 1867
- Location: Dayton, Ohio
- Country: United States
- Coordinates: 39°44′50″N 84°15′29″W
- Type: United States National Cemetery
- Size: 116.8 acres (47.3 ha)
- No. of graves: 62,000+
- Website: Dayton National Cemetery
- Find a Grave: Dayton National Cemetery

Dayton National Cemetery is a United States National Cemetery located in the city of Dayton in Montgomery County, Ohio. It encompasses 116.8 acres (47.3 ha) and as of July 18, 2019, had 55,359 interments. In January, 2014, it was one of only fourteen cemeteries to be designated as a national shrine. In July of 2014, a new 2,000 niche columbarium was dedicated. October 2023 saw another 2,080-niche columbarium and 2,512 in-ground plots for cremains. It is one of a few National Cemeteries with their own Honor Squad. Since its formation, unless refused by family and during a few weeks due to Covid the National Cemetery Administration disallowed military honors in their cemeteries, no veteran has been buried without a Rifle Salute in addition to "Taps" and the folding and presentation of the Flag. It is also the only National Cemetery with the remains of a funeral tunnel which once allowed deceased veterans to be removed from the Home Hospital to the cemetery. Plans are in process to restore the entrance into the tunnel to its original form. Dayton National Cemetery is one of a few cemeteries in America with a live bugler each weekday.

== History ==
The cemetery was established in 1867 as a place to inter veterans who died while under the care of the Central Branch of the National Asylum for Disabled Volunteer Soldiers and Seamen, located in Dayton. It was the third such home authorized by Abraham Lincoln, March 3, 1865, just before his death. The first interment, of Civil War veteran Cornelius Solly, was on September 11, 1867. The National Asylum became part of the newly formed Department of Veterans Affairs in 1930 and evolved into today's Dayton VA Medical Center. The cemetery was administered as part of the medical center until 1973, when it was transferred to the National Cemetery Administration.

Dayton National Cemetery is one of eight National Cemeteries with the remains of veterans from every major conflict the United States has been involved in dating back to the American Revolutionary War. 650 Colored Troops are interred at Dayton National Cemetery, one of the largest collection of Colored Troops' graves which links the cemetery even further with Lincoln since he authorized the creation of Colored Troops units.

== Noteworthy monuments ==
- The Dayton Soldiers' Monument was constructed between 1873 and 1877. It is a 30-foot (9.1 m) marble column on a granite base. Dedicated by President Rutherford B. Hayes.
- A memorial to 33 soldiers of the War of 1812 buried in this cemetery. A bronze plaque on a boulder.
- A memorial to all Masonic Veterans was erected in 2018. Dedicated by Eric R. Schau, Grand Master and the Grand Lodge of Ohio.

== Notable interments ==
- Medal of Honor recipients
  - Henry W. Downs (1844–1911), for action in the American Civil War
  - Oscar Wadsworth Field (1873–1912), for action in the Spanish–American War
  - George Geiger (1843–1904), for action at the Battle of Little Bighorn during the Indian Wars
  - John H. James (1835–1914), for action in the Civil War
  - Charles A. Taggart (1843–1938), for action in the Civil War
- Others
  - Big Joe Duskin (1921–2007), American blues and boogie-woogie pianist
  - Joe Henderson (1937–2001), jazz saxophonist
  - Tommy Henrich (1913–2009), Major League Baseball player
  - James Hobbs (1819-1880), Scout for the Texas Rangers, author of Wild Life in the Far West (1872)
  - Stubby Magner (1888–1956), Major League Baseball player
  - Christian Null (1770–1832), Revolutionary War Soldier
  - Marsena R. Patrick (1811–1888), U.S. Army general
  - Johnnie Wilder Jr. (1949–2006), R&B/funk vocalist
  - Paul P. Yoder (1897–1965), Ohio Lieutenant Governor (1937–1939)
  - Emma L. Miller (1828–1914) the first Female VA employee, the first woman to be commissioned in the US Army and the first woman to be provided full military honors.

Other interments

- One British Commonwealth war grave, of a Canadian Army Corporal who served from 1939-1945 and later in the U.S. Navy. (died 1947)
