= John James (American poet) =

American poet, critic, and digital collagist

- Born: Los Angeles, California, U.S.
- Education: Columbia University School of the Arts, Georgetown University
- Occupations: Poet, critic, digital collagist
- Organization(s): University of California, Berkeley
- Notable work: The Milk Hours, Chthonic

John Patrick James is an American poet, critic, and digital collagist. He is the author of The Milk Hours, selected by Henri Cole for the 2018 Max Ritvo Poetry Prize and forthcoming from Milkweed Editions. He is also the author of Chthonic, winner of the 2014 CutBank Chapbook Competition. His poems appear in Boston Review, Kenyon Review, Gulf Coast, Poetry Northwest, Best New Poets 2013 and 2016, Best American Poetry 2017, and other publications.

== Biography ==
James was born in Los Angeles, California and raised in Louisville, Kentucky. He earned an M.F.A. in creative writing (poetry) from Columbia University's School of the Arts and an M.A. in English literature at Georgetown University, where he served as graduate associate to the Lannan Center for Poetics and Social Practice. James has taught at the University of the District of Columbia, The Potomac School, and Georgetown University, where he directs the Creative Writing Institute. He lives in the San Francisco Bay Area, where he is a Ph.D. student in English literature at the University of California, Berkeley.

His book reviews have been published in Boston Review, Colorado Review, Kenyon Review Online, and The Iowa Review. His collages are published in Quarterly West.

Of The Milk Hours, prize judge Henri Cole writes, "“The poetry of the earth is intensely alive in the poems of John James... Out of the sorrowful fragments of personal history, [he] has a created a book of unusual intelligence and beauty.”

== Bibliography ==
- Extinction Song, North Adams, Massachusetts : Tupelo Press, 2026. (Forthcoming.)
- Winter, Glossolalia, London, United Kingdom : Black Spring Press Group, 2022. ISBN 9781915406231, OCLC 1356910368
- The Milk Hours, Minneapolis, Minnesota : Milkweed Editions, 2019. ISBN 9781571315083, OCLC 1104044730
- Chthonic, CutBank Books, 2015. ISBN 9781939717108, OCLC 904756973

== Poems ==
- "The Milk Hours" at Academy of American Poets
- "History (n.)" at The Kenyon Review' (reprinted in Best American Poetry 2017
- "Metamorphoses" at Boston Review
- "At Assateague", "End," and "Le Moribond" at The Missouri Review
- "Spaghetti Western" at Split This Rock
- "Forget the Song" at California Journal of Poetics
- "Famous Tombs" at Colorado Review
- "Kentucky, September" at DIAGRAM

== Scholarship and criticism ==
- "Soot Moth: Biston Betularia and the Victorian End of Nature," co-authored with Nathan K. Hensley, at BRANCH: Britain, Representation, and Nineteenth Century History
- "Blake in/of Time: Presentism and Literary Form" at V21: Victorian Studies for the 21st Century
- "Astralize the Night," review of Anne Carson's Float at Boston Review
- "On Canine Dasein," review of Frank Bidart's Metaphysical Dog, at Boston Review
- "Learn Your Lesson / From the Calf: Rebecca Gayle Howell's Render/An Apocalypse at Kenyon Review Online
