= Jack James =

Jack James may refer to:

- Jack James (Australian footballer) (1892–1977), Australian rules footballer for St Kilda and Richmond in the Victorian Football League
- Jack James (footballer, born 2000), defender for Luton Town
- Jack James (rocket engineer) (1920–2001), worked on NASA's Mariner program
- Jack A. James Jr., United States Army general

== See also ==
- John James (disambiguation)
