= Oscar Wadsworth Field =

- Born: October 6, 1873; Jersey City, New Jersey, U.S.
- Died: January 5, 1912 (aged 38); Dayton, Ohio, U.S.
- Burial place: Dayton National Cemetery, Dayton, Ohio
- Military career
- Allegiance: United States of America
- Branch: United States Marine Corps
- Service years: 1896–1905
- Rank: Private
- Unit: USS Nashville (PG-7)
- Conflicts: Spanish–American War
- Awards: Medal of Honor

Oscar Wadsworth Field (October 6, 1873 – January 5, 1912) was a private serving in the United States Marine Corps during the Spanish–American War who received the Medal of Honor for bravery.

== Biography ==
Field was born on October 6, 1873, in Jersey City, New Jersey. He joined the Marine Corps from Brooklyn in August 1896, and was honorably discharged in November 1905.

Field died on January 5, 1912, was buried at Dayton National Cemetery in Dayton, Ohio. His grave can be found in section Q, row A, grave 9.

== Medal of Honor citation ==
Rank and organization: Private, U.S. Marine Corps. Born: 6 October 1873, Jersey City, N.J. Accredited to: New York. G.O. No.: 521, 7 July 1899.

Citation:

On board the U.S.S. Nashville during the operation of cutting the cable leading from Cienfuegos, Cuba, 11 May 1898. Facing the heavy fire of the enemy, Field set an example of extraordinary bravery and coolness throughout this action.

== See also ==
- List of Medal of Honor recipients for the Spanish–American War
