= Henry W. Downs =

- Born: August 29, 1844; Jamaica, Vermont, U.S.
- Died: July 2, 1911 (aged 66); Dayton, Ohio, U.S.
- Burial place: Dayton National Cemetery, Dayton, Ohio
- Military career
- Allegiance: United States (Union)
- Branch: United States Army; Union Army
- Rank: Second Lieutenant
- Unit: 8th Vermont Volunteer Infantry Regiment
- Conflicts: American Civil War • Battle of Opequon
- Awards: Medal of Honor

Henry W. Downs (August 29, 1844 – July 2, 1911) was a Union Army soldier serving in the 8th Vermont Volunteer Infantry Regiment (Note: The 8th Vermont was raised for service in the Department of the Gulf before transferring to Virginia. See its Wikipedia article for more information.) during the American Civil War. He received the Medal of Honor for gallantry during the Battle of Opequon more commonly called the Third Battle of Winchester, Virginia on September 19, 1864. He is buried at Dayton National Cemetery in Dayton, Ohio.

== Medal of Honor citation ==
"The President of the United States of America, in the name of Congress, takes pleasure in presenting the Medal of Honor to Sergeant Henry W. Downs, United States Army, for extraordinary heroism on 19 September 1864, while serving with Company I, 8th Vermont Infantry, in action at Winchester, Virginia. With one comrade, Sergeant Downs voluntarily crossed an open field, exposed to a raking fire, and returned with a supply of ammunition, successfully repeating the attempt a short time thereafter."

== See also ==
- List of Medal of Honor recipients
- List of American Civil War Medal of Honor recipients: A–F
