= Wild Life in the Far West =

1867 fictionalized novel by James Hobbs

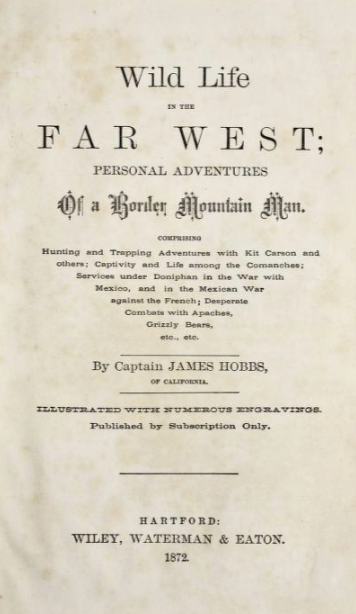
- Title page for Wild Life in the Far West (1872)
- Author: James Hobbs
- Language: English
- Publisher: Wiley, Waterman & Eaton
- Publication date: 1872
- Publication place: United States

Wild Life in the Far West: Personal Adventures of a Border Mountain Man is a purported memoir of life in the 19th-century American west written by James Hobbs (c. 1819 – 1880) first published in 1872. The text alleges to be a firsthand account of many important events in the early American West: Hobbs claims to have been a member of Kit Carson's exploratory party, fought in the Mexican-American War, and the prospected during the California Gold Rush. Wild Life has been summarized by historical author David Remley as "a fanciful book of 'personal adventures'...much of which is clearly exaggerated and perhaps wholly fabricated."

The book is primarily notable in that—despite numerous falsehoods—it remains in print and a commonly-cited reference by academic authors detailing early California and Native American civilizations. The book covers places and times where firsthand testimonials were rare, and some authors cite Hobbs' book as a reference while simultaneously warning that his testimony is unreliable. Notable texts that have cited Hobbs' book include Captives and Cousins by James F. Brooks, The Comanche Empire by Pekka Hämäläinen, and The Apache Wars by Paul Andrew Hutton.

== Original publication and promotional tour ==
The book was first published in 1872 by the Connecticut firm of Wiley, Waterman & Eaton, with the stories being “taken down from [Hobbs’] own dictation by two different writers in” Hartford. The initial printing was nearly 500 pages and contained a number of elaborate illustrations. The book was heavily advertised in newspapers across the country and was distributed widely upon release.

Following publication of Wild Life in the Far West, Hobbs embarked on speaking tours throughout the eastern half of the United States. At these engagements, he was often billed as "Comanche Jim," and performed a combination of lasso tricks and stories at schools and courthouses. One review compared his lecture to a "rehash of Beadle's dime novels."

By 1877, he had begun telling audiences that he was the great-grandson of Tecumseh—a statement that appears to have had no basis in reality. In January 1878, Hobbs was committed to a Cincinnati, Ohio insane asylum “as a lunatic.” Sometime later that year he was moved to the National Soldiers Home in Dayton, where he continued giving his well-rehearsed lectures to the other inmates. Hobbs died at the home of his friend “Rocky Mountain Jim” in Brookville, Ohio on February 22, 1880. He is buried at the Dayton National Cemetery.

== Contemporary reaction ==
Several chapters from Wild Life in the Far West are set in California's Inyo County, primarily taking place during the so-called Owens Valley Indian War of the 1860s. Pleasant Chalfant, longtime Inyo resident and senior editor of the Inyo Independent newspaper, was likely an acquaintance of Hobbs and proved a steadfast critic of his writing. In 1874, he ran passages from Wild Life in the Independent under the heading "Another Chapter of Those Lies," while also inviting local citizens to write in with corrected versions of tales from Hobbs' book.

Inyo County Sheriff W.L. "Dad" Moore wrote to the Independent correcting Hobbs' error-filled account of the January 1865 McGuire family murders at Haiwee Meadows and subsequent Native American massacre at Owens Lake. In addition to getting many basic dates, names, and details incorrect, Wild Life also paints Hobbs as a major player in both events. In his letter to the Independent, Moore asserts that Hobbs was not present at all, and in fact "was never in this country until four or five years after these occurrences." Moore further expounded: "During my life I have read a number of fabulous narratives, romances founded on the semblance of facts; but after reading that little yarn of Capt. Hobbs'...I am compelled to say that of the many stupendous frauds submitted to an enlightened public, this story of Hobbs' eclipses anything that has been written. [...] I must say that any person who is familiar with the history of this country will give no credence whatever to any of Capt. Hobbs' stories."

In 1876, an acquaintance of Hobbs wrote Chicago's Inter Ocean newspaper with multiple accusations against the author's character, stating that "he is the author of [Wild Life] about as much as Spotted Tail is of the Pentateuch."

== Later reception ==
In his 2003 book Kit Carson & His Three Wives: A Family History (published by University of New Mexico Press), Marc Simmons notes that Hobbs "claimed to have been a companion of" Kit Carson. Simmons further states that Wild Life in the Far West "popularized the fiction that" Carson's daughter Adaline's Arapaho name was "Prairie Flower," noting that Hobbs plagiarized the concept from the 1853 book Lena Leota, or The Prairie Flower by J.P.R. James.
