= George Geiger =

- Born: c. 1843; Cincinnati, Ohio
- Died: 1904 (aged 60–61)
- Burial place: Dayton National Cemetery, Ohio
- Military career
- Allegiance: United States of America
- Branch: United States Army
- Service years: 1861 - 1865, 1867 - 1877
- Rank: Sergeant
- Units: Company H, 7th United States Cavalry
- Conflicts: Battle of the Little Big Horn
- Awards: Medal of Honor

George Geiger (c. 1843–1904) was a sergeant in the United States Army and the recipient to the highest military decoration for valor in combat — the Medal of Honor — for having distinguished himself at the Battle of the Little Big Horn on June 25, 1876, during the Indian Wars.

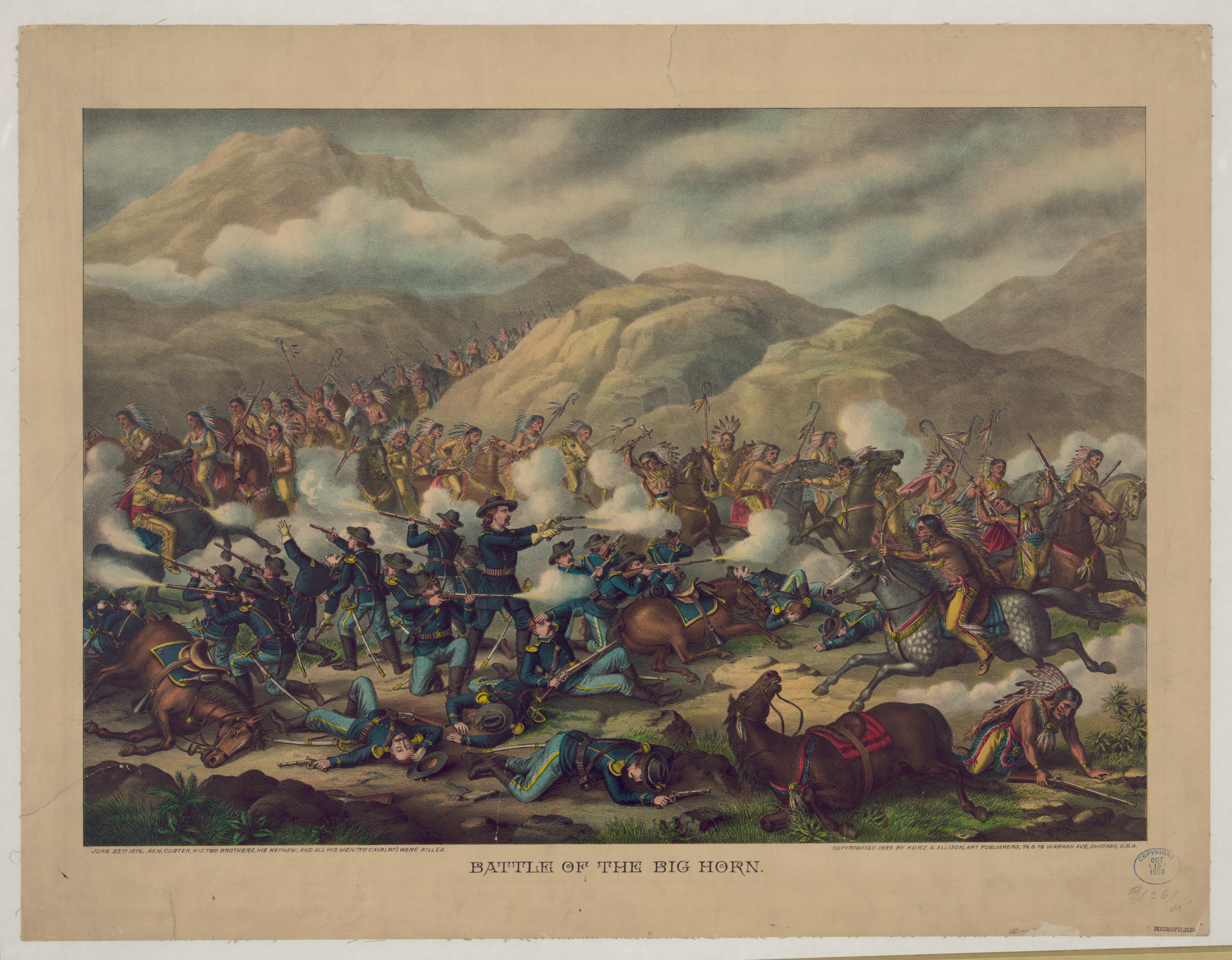
Battle of the Big Horn

== Biography ==
Born in Cincinnati in about 1843, he enlisted, June 15, 1861, with the 47th Ohio Infantry, Company A, in Cincinnati. Captured outside of Atlanta, he was imprisoned in the notorious Andersonville Prison Camp for two months and four days. Geiger was discharged August 11, 1865, in Little Rock, Arkansas.

He reenlisted with Troop M, of the 7th U.S. Cavalry, November 29, 1867, in St. Louis, Missouri. Geiger completed his enlistment and was discharged November 29, 1872, in Unionville, South Carolina. Nineteen days later, in Louisville, Kentucky, he reenlisted with the 7th Cavalry and was attached to Troop H, December 18, 1872. He completed his service and was discharged, for medical reasons, at Ft. Buford, South Dakota, December 18, 1877.

Geiger is described in military records as having been dark complexioned, gray eyes, 5' 5" in height. He could read and write.

Military records identify him as a Protestant.

Geiger was admitted multiple times to the Dayton, Ohio VA hospital for various service-related illnesses ranging from chronic dysentery to rheumatism, beginning in 1897. He died January 23, 1904, age 61. Geiger was married. He was survived by his half brother, Edward Metzer, 1208 W. 7th Street, Cincinnati, Ohio.

Geiger was interred in the Dayton National Cemetery, Montgomery County, Ohio, Section N, Row 20, Grave 47.

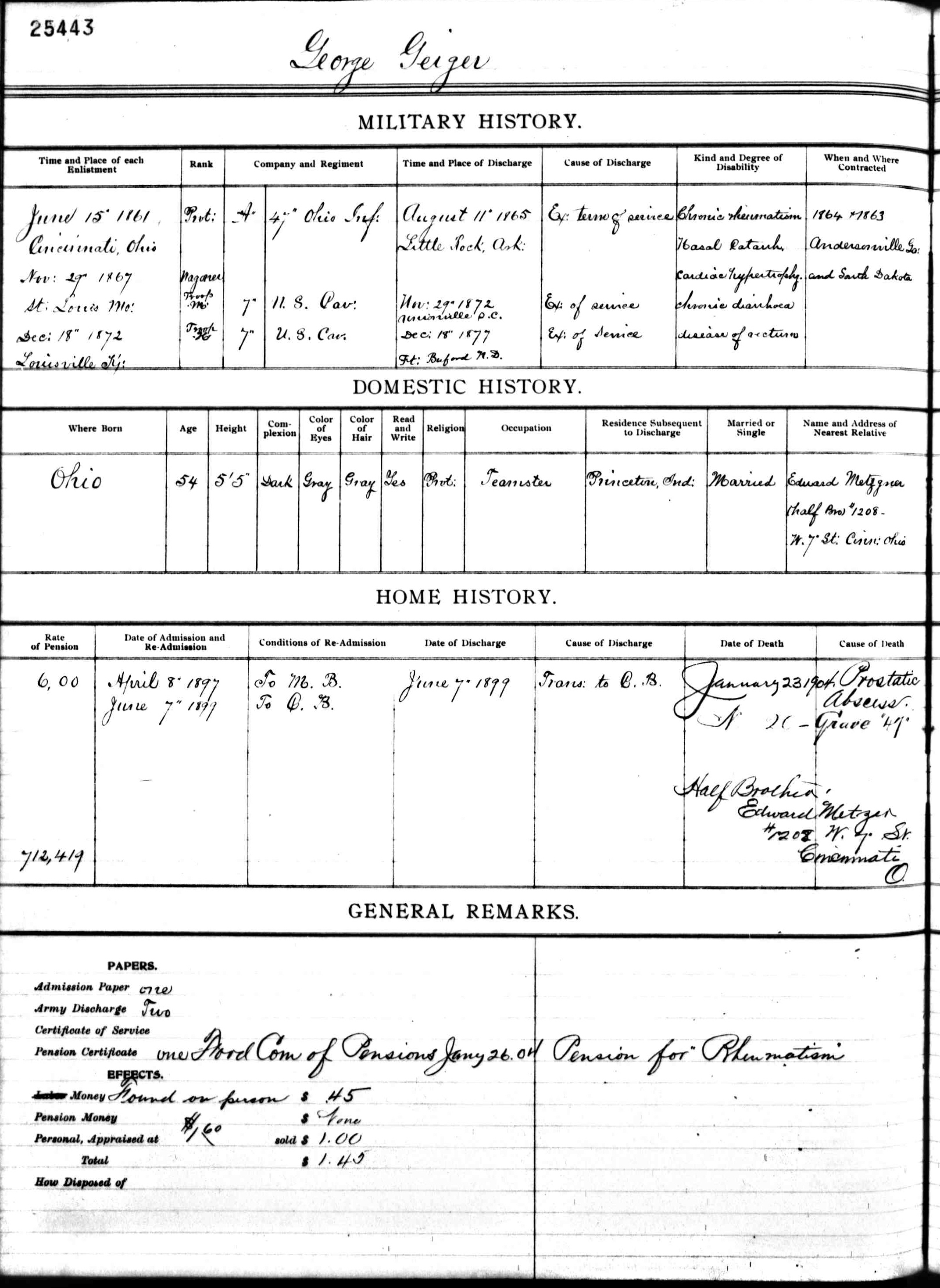
Geiger's military record

== Medal of honor citation ==
- Rank and organization: Sergeant, Company H, 7th United States Cavalry.
- Places and dates: Little Big Horn River, Montana, June 25, 1876
- Entered Service at: San Francisco, California, October 15, 1866
- Birth: 1843, Cincinnati, Ohio
- Date of issue: October 5, 1878

Citation:

With 3 comrades during the entire engagement courageously held a position that secured water for the command.

=== Description of action ===
Sergeant George Geiger was one of twenty-four soldiers of the 7th Cavalry to earn the Medal of Honor during the Battle of the Little Big Horn on June 25, 1876, often called "Custer's Last Stand." Five men received awards for direct combat actions. Sergeant Geiger was one of nineteen men who was cited for heroism in obtaining critical water for the wounded. Along with Private Charles Windolph, Blacksmith Henry Mechlin, and Saddler Otto Voit, Sergeant Geiger took up an exposed position outside of the cavalry's line of defense in order to draw enemy fire away from fifteen other men who risked their own lives to get water from the river. For four hours the four valiant troopers, acting as both decoys and an attacking force, dodged bullets and laid down a protective covering fire. They accomplished their mission so well that not one of the men who dashed the eighty yards from the cavalry encampment to the river was killed.

== See also ==
- List of Medal of Honor recipients for the Indian Wars
