= Charles A. Taggart =

Union Army soldier in the American Civil War

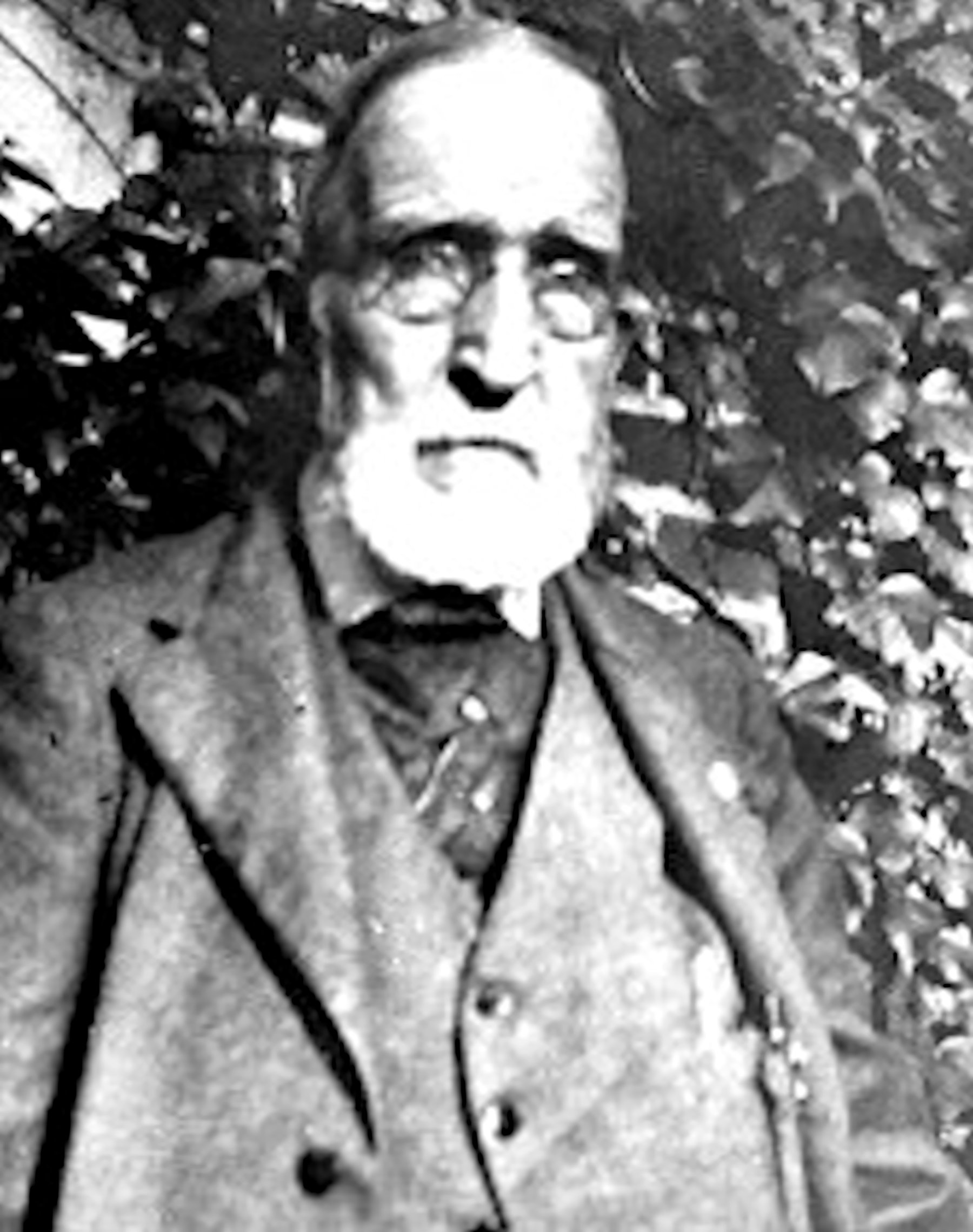
- Born: January 17, 1843; Blandford, Massachusetts
- Died: April 10, 1938 (aged 95)
- Burial place: Dayton National Cemetery, Dayton, Ohio
- Military career
- Allegiance: United States
- Branch: United States Army
- Rank: Private
- Unit: 37th Massachusetts Infantry
- Conflicts: American Civil War • Battle of Sayler's Creek
- Awards: Medal of Honor

Charles A. Taggart (January 17, 1843 – April 10, 1938) was a Union Army soldier in the American Civil War who received the U.S. military's highest decoration, the Medal of Honor.

== Biography ==
Born on January 17, 1843, in Blandford, Massachusetts, Taggart was living in Otis, Massachusetts, when he joined the Army. He served during the Civil War as a private in Company B of the 37th Massachusetts Infantry. At the Battle of Sayler's Creek on April 6, 1865, he captured a battle flag. For this action, he was awarded the Medal of Honor a month later, on May 10, 1865.

Taggart died on April 10, 1938, at age 95 and was buried at Dayton National Cemetery in Dayton, Ohio.

== Medal of Honor citation ==
Citation:

Capture of flag.

== See also ==
- List of American Civil War Medal of Honor recipients: T-Z
