= Yoseñio V. Lewis =

Transgender rights activist and educator

Yoseñio V. Lewis is a transgender rights activist, educator and musician.

== Activism ==
In 1998 Jamison Green referred to Lewis as a "rising star" among trans men activists, placing him at the vanguard of visibility and political action for trans men.

As an activist for transgender healthcare, Lewis served on the National Advisory Board for the Center of Excellence for Transgender Health. In 2013, he was a honoree of the inaugural Trans 100 List for his health education work.

Lewis has served on the boards of the Woodhull Freedom Foundation, Unid@s, and the National LGBTQ Task Force.

Lewis has described himself as a "shit-stirrer" who interrupts complacency.

== Art ==
Lewis is a founding member of "The TransAms," an all-transgender barbershop quartet. He has been featured in documentaries including Trappings of Transhood (1997), Transgender Revolution (1998), The Believers (2006), and Diagnosing Difference (2009).

Lewis is also a poet. His poem "I wish i looked like Matthew Shepard" highlights the tragic ironies and racial and socioeconomic aspects of anti-LGBTQ hate crimes.

Lewis sees his art and activism as interconnected, saying that "there can be no art without activism and no activism without art."
