= CutBank =

- Discipline: Literary journal
- Language: English

Publication details
- History: 1973-present
- Publisher: University of Montana (United States)
- Frequency: Biannual

Standard abbreviations
- ISO 4: CutBank

Indexing
- ISSN: 0734-9963

Links
- Journal homepage

CutBank is a literary journal that is affiliated with the University of Montana's creative writing program. The journal was founded in 1973 with the help of William Kittredge among others. It is the third incarnation of the magazine at the university. The first was founded in 1920 and called the Montanan which was later changed to Frontier. It awards the prestigious Montana Prize in Fiction, Montana Prize in Creative Nonfiction, and Patricia Goedicke Prize in Poetry. It publishes fiction, nonfiction, poetry, reviews, and art, twice a year.

The 2012 Montana Prize in Fiction went to Matt Valentine, while the Montana Prize in Creative Nonfiction went to Daisy Pitkin, and the Patricia Goedicke Prize in Poetry went to Jeff Downey.

Previous contributors to CutBank include Steve Almond, Pam Houston, Jacob M. Appel, and Dara Wier.

== See also ==
- List of literary magazines
