= John James (archdeacon of the Seychelles) =

John Charles James was Archdeacon of the Seychelles.

James was educated at Keble College, Oxford and Lincoln Theological College; and ordained in 1971. His first post was a curacy in South Shields. He was Priest in charge at St Mary, Jarrow before his time as Archdeacon; and Vicar of Mylor, Cornwall with Flushing.
