= John James (administrator) =

Australian-born business administrator (born 1967)

John James (born 1967) is an Australian-born business administrator. He is best known for being the former chief executive officer of the Port Adelaide Football Club in the Australian Football League. During his time as CEO of the club they reached the AFL Grand Final in 2007 and he also experienced the clubs AFL premiership in his first year in the role in 2004.

In 2008 James moved to the United States to work for investment company Vanguard. James has worked in the US, Australia and the UK for Vanguard and was appointed in 2016 to be a member of Vanguard's global executive team as Chief Human Resources Officer. James is now based with his family in Villanova Pennsylvania.

He is a University of Adelaide alumni.
