= John James (MP for Weymouth) =

English politician

John James (fl. 1379–1419) was an English politician. He sat as MP for Weymouth in September 1388, 1391 and November 1414.
