= K. C. Potter =

American academic administrator (1939–2024)

- Born: June 30, 1939; Fallsburg, Kentucky, U.S.
- Died: August 26, 2024 (aged 85); Centerville, Tennessee, U.S.
- Education: Berea College (BA); Vanderbilt University Law School (JD)
- Occupation: Academic administrator
- Years active: 1965–1998
- Employer: Vanderbilt University
- Known for: LGBTQ rights activism

K. C. Potter (June 30, 1939 – August 26, 2024) was an American academic administrator. He was a dean emeritus of residential and judicial affairs at Vanderbilt University. Potter is recognized for his pioneering support of LGBTQ rights at Vanderbilt. The Vanderbilt K. C. Potter Center is named in his honor and houses the Office for LGBTQI Life.

== Early life and education ==
Potter was born in Fallsburg, Kentucky, in 1939. He earned a B.A. from Berea College in 1961. Potter completed a J.D. degree at Vanderbilt University Law School in 1964. While attending law school, Potter worked as an assistant resident adviser.

== Career ==
Potter worked as a law clerk for the Tennessee Supreme Court and was admitted to the Tennessee Bar Association. In 1965, Potter became the assistant dean of men. In this role, he oversaw housing, discipline, and the Vanderbilt police department.

In the late 1960s, a student requested to change his dorm because his roommate was gay. Potter authorized the room change. A year later, the roommate jumped out of one of the 12-story towers on campus. Potter thought the suicide was likely the result of an internal struggle with his sexuality and the conservative environment of Vanderbilt. This is a moment that impacted Potter's career.

In 1971, after the offices of dean of men and women were combined, he was made associate dean in the Office of Student Life. In 1977, Potter became the dean of residential and judicial affairs where he worked as the chief arbiter and addressed student conduct. He also managed the campus housing, fraternities and sororities, and LGBTQ student issues.

In 1987, a homophobic article in the student paper was published. Potter went to his supervisor, the associate provost, to reach out to the LGBTQ students. He led the first initiative to create a safe space for LGBTQ students on campus that year. In the fall, Potter started a regular meet up group for LGBTQ students to convene at his house on campus. This support became the Vanderbilt Lambda Association. A few years later, Potter supported the newly formed student gay rights group in their effort to establish a formalized university nondiscrimination policy. Potter established congressional-style hearings to develop a policy and to testify to the board of trustees.

== Personal life and legacy ==
Potter resided on the Vanderbilt campus in Cumberland House, one of the West Side Row cottages. He retired in June 1998. Potter came out as a gay man after his retirement. Shortly thereafter, he began a relationship with his partner, Richard Patrick. They lived together on their farm in Hickman County, Tennessee and got married in 2020.

In his retirement, Potter was known to enjoy a quiet life. The couple often hosted annual events at their farm house, which drew attention from Vanderbilt Alumni. The events include a "Fall Feast Gathering of Friends," and a "Summer Cinema Nights concert."

In 1991, Potter was awarded the "Distinguished Alumni Award" for 25 years of service to the ROTC at Vanderbilt. In 1994, he was also awarded the Bob E. Leech Award by the National Association of Student Personnel Administrators in recognition of his service to the campus community.

In 2008, Euclid House became the K.C. Potter Center in honor of his support of inclusiveness and the LGBTQI community. It houses the Office of LGBTQI Life. In 2015, Potter was featured in the documentary film, A Secret Only God Knows. It chronicles the LGBTQ community in Middle Tennessee before 1970. The documentary premiered on Nashville public television and includes interviews conducted by the Brooks Fund History Project that are archived in the special collections division at Nashville Public Library. In 2019, Potter's efforts to support LGBTQ rights were featured in The Book of Pride. Released in 2019, Potter is featured in the short documentary Show Me the Way that shares how he was closeted during his entire professional life. In honor of his dedication and advancements at Vanderbilt, Potter was included in a project involving the painting of notable figures in the campus community, becoming a "Vanderbilt Trailblazer" in 2019.

Potter died on August 26, 2024, at the age of 85.
