= John H. James (sailor) =

- Born: c. 1835; Boston, Massachusetts
- Died: August 3, 1914 (aged 78–79)
- Burial place: Dayton National Cemetery, Dayton, Ohio
- Military career
- Allegiance: United States
- Branch: United States Navy
- Rank: Captain of the Top
- Unit: USS Richmond
- Conflicts: American Civil War • Battle of Mobile Bay
- Awards: Medal of Honor

John H. James (c. 1835 – August 3, 1914) was a Union Navy sailor in the American Civil War and a recipient of the U.S. military's highest decoration, the Medal of Honor, for his actions at the Battle of Mobile Bay.

Born in about 1835 in Boston, Massachusetts, James was still living in that city when he joined the Navy. He served during the Civil War as a captain of the top and gun captain on the USS Richmond. At the Battle of Mobile Bay on August 5, 1864, he "fought his gun with skill and courage" despite heavy fire. For this action, he was awarded the Medal of Honor four months later, on December 31, 1864.

James's official Medal of Honor citation reads:

As captain of a gun on board the U.S.S. Richmond during action against rebel forts and gunboats and with the ram Tennessee in Mobile Bay, 5 August 1864. Despite damage to his ship and the loss of several men on board as enemy fire raked her decks, James fought his gun with skill and courage throughout a furious 2-hour battle which resulted in the surrender of the rebel ram Tennessee and in the damaging and destruction of batteries at Fort Morgan.

James died on August 3, 1914, at age 78 or 79 and was buried at Dayton National Cemetery in Dayton, Ohio.
