= John T. James =

NASA scientist

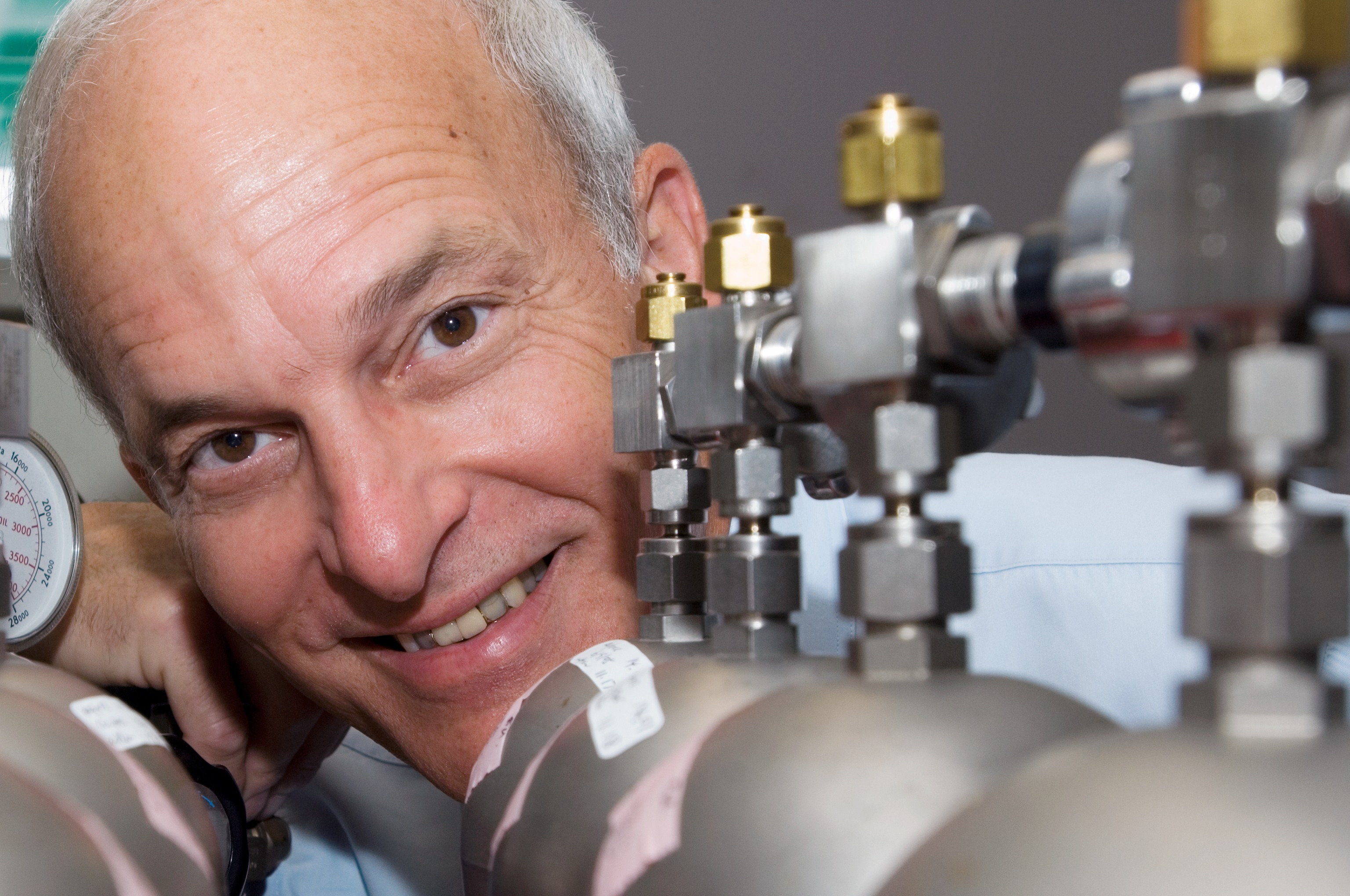
- Born: John Thorpe James; Memphis, Tennessee
- Education: BA, Physics, Mathematics and Astronomy, University of Kansas; MA, Astronomy, University of Virginia; MS, Chemistry, University of Maryland, College Park, PhD, Pathology, University of Maryland School of Medicine
- Occupation: Toxicologist/Medical Scientist
- Employer: NASA

John T. James is an American toxicologist who is the Chief Toxicologist for the National Aeronautics & Space Administration. He leads the Space Toxicology Office located at Lyndon B. Johnson Space Center in Houston, Texas.

== Education ==
James received his BA in Physics, Mathematics and Astronomy from the University of Kansas in 1968. He earned an MA in Astronomy from the University of Virginia in 1970, an MS in Chemistry from the University of Maryland College Park in 1977, and a PhD in Pathology from the Graduate School of the University of Maryland School of Medicine in Baltimore in 1982. His doctoral thesis was entitled The DNA Adducts and Neoplastic Changes Produced in the Large Intestine of ICR/Ha and CSTBI/Ha Mice by 1,2-Dimethylhydrazine.

In 1986 James became a Diplomate of the American Board of Toxicology (DABT). In James toxicology career, he studied chemical warfare defense and in Maryland as well.

== NASA career ==
James is the chief scientist of space toxicology at Johnson Space Center in Houston, Texas. He joined the NASA team in 1989. He is responsible for the quality of air in spacecraft that carry humans, including the Space Shuttle and the International Space Station. He leads a team of experts who set air quality and water quality standards for spacecraft and verify compliance with those standards through environmental monitoring. His team also controls the toxicological risk posed by any chemical or compound that could enter a human-rated spacecraft. His current research interests focus on the assessment of the toxicity of lunar dust and developing a hand-held monitor for volatile organic compounds present in spacecraft air. He has received letters of commendation, sustained superior performance awards, the Shuttle Star award, the NASA exceptional service medal, and most recently NASA's Silver Snoopy Award from the astronaut corps, for his work and dedication to the health and safety of crewmembers.

James served as an inhalation toxicologist for the U.S. Army at the Chemical Research Development and Engineering Center in Aberdeen Proving Ground, MD from 1982 to 1989. There he was responsible for projects on multispecies inhalation toxicity to achieve accurate human estimates on chemical warfare agents. From 1978 to 1981 he served as a guest investigator at the National Cancer Institute in Bethesda, MD where he discovered a relationship between chemically induced colon tumors in two strains of mice and the persistence of miscoding DNA adducts in colonic mucosa. He is the inventor of three research devices including a gas mask filter test apparatus and a charcoal adsorbent test apparatus.

His current research interests focus on the toxic effects of inhaled dusts to include carbon nanotubes, which are useful in making high-strength and light-weight materials, and lunar dust, which could be a health problem when humans return to the Moon for good. He and his team are developing differential mobility spectrometry for applications to spacecraft air quality monitoring.

== Patient safety ==
James' personal activities center on patient safety advocacy, which developed as a result of loss of his 19-year-old son to medical errors. This spurred his personal interest in patient safety advocacy. He has spoken to civic, religious, political, legislative, and expert groups on ways to improve patient safety. He is the recipient of the Semmelweis Society award for patient safety advocacy and was a 2008 Patient and Family Scholar to the National Patient Safety Foundation meeting. James is author of "A Sea of Broken Hearts" published in 2007; he founded Patient Safety America in 2008 and distributes a monthly newsletter on patient safety to hundreds of members. His newsletter is designed to inform the public of new scientific discoveries published in major medical journals that could affect their safety when they seek healthcare. Members of Patient Safety America are encouraged and guided to support national legislation that fosters patient safety in America. The Patient Safety Action Network founded by James is aiming to eliminate preventable medical errors. The organization remained active in 2026.

James estimated that preventable medical errors lead to around 210,000 death every year. Based on his studies, the actual number could be more than twice as high.

In 2019, James co-authored a study examining patients information needs during informed consent and the role of shared decision making in medical care.

== Personal life ==
James married Donna Breniser of Ligonier, PA in 1976 and they have had three children.

James became a patient safety activist after the death of his teenage son.

== Inventions ==
- James JT. Research Apparatus. United States Statutory Invention Registration No. H145, October 7, 1986
- James JT, Buettner LC, Genovese JA. Gas Mask Filter Test Apparatus. U.S. Patent No. 4,622,852, November 18, 1986
- Genovese JA, James JT, Buettner LC. Charcoal Adsorbent Test Apparatus and Method Using Filter Tubes. United States Statutory Invention Registration No. H255, April 7, 1987

== Selected papers ==
- James, John T. (September 2013). "A New, Evidence-based Estimate of Patient Harms Associated with Hospital Care". Journal of Patient Safety. 9 (3): 122–128. doi:10.1097/PTS.0b013e3182948a69. PMID 23860193. S2CID 15280516.

== Sources ==
- NASA.gov
- "Patient Safety America".
- http://iom.edu/Object.File/Master/61/240/James%20BIO.pdf
- NASA.gov
- "TechBriefs.com - News Center - Who's Who at NASA". November 20, 2008. Archived from the original on 2008-11-20.
- M.D, Jeffrey R. Davis; Johnson, Robert; Stepanek, Jan (January 28, 2008). Fundamentals of Aerospace Medicine. Lippincott Williams & Wilkins. ISBN 9780781774666 – via Google Books.
- https://www.amazon.com/Sea-Broken-Hearts-Dangerous-Profit-Driven/dp/1434321363
- https://pubmed.ncbi.nlm.nih.gov/23860193/
