= John S. James =

US LGBT rights activist and editor

John S. James, born in Brooklyn, New York in 1941, is a pioneering US LGBT rights activist and the writer and editor of AIDS Treatment News, one of the first and the most influential publications focused on documenting cutting-edge, science-based AIDS research and treatment. AIDS Treatment News was founded in 1986 and published until 2007. It was widely read by people living with HIV/AIDS, policymakers, clinicians, researchers, and activists. The newsletters were later collected into two volumes and published by Celestial Arts Press in Berkeley, California. A selection of the newsletters is available in the archive of the University of California San Francisco.

James also participated in the pre-Stonewall Annual Reminders, a gay rights group that picketed at Independence Hall in Philadelphia, Pennsylvania every year on July 4 from 1965 to 1969 to remind the American people that "millions of queer American citizens were denied the rights of 'life, liberty, and the pursuit of happiness' spelled out in the Declaration of Independence."

By 1990 AIDS Treatment News had received several awards (1988 from Bay Area Physicians for Human Rights; 1988 from San Francisco Cable Car Award; 1989 from Bay Area Gay and Lesbian Alliance; 1990 from Gay and Lesbian Press Association and Media Fund for Human Rights; and 1990 from the Newsletter Association). It was featured in The New York Times, "Underground Press Leads Way on AIDS Advice," on December 16, 1991.

More recently, James won the 2019 Kiyoshi Kurimiya Award, given by Philadelphia FIGHT, a Philadelphia AIDS treatment and advocacy organization, in honor of his ground-breaking journalism. Kiyoshi Kuromiya was a Philadelphia civil rights and AIDS activist.

James graduated cum laude from Harvard College in 1963. From 1963 to 1986 he was a computer programmer, teacher, and writer on computer languages and related topics before founding AIDS Treatment News. In the early 1980s, he established CommuniTree, a computer network and electronic bulletin board system based in Santa Cruz, California.

Later, with the advent of the World Wide Web, James founded a website named Age Treatment News to curate and publicize scientific developments in the pursuit of a longer, healthy life.
