= Steve Dain =

Transgender activist

Doctor Steve Dain
- Born: July 9, 1939
- Died: October 13, 2007 (aged 68)
- Education: University of California, Berkeley (BA, 1961); University of California, Berkeley (MA, MPhEd, 1963); Life Chiropractic College West (DC, 1988), Life Chiropractic College West (ND, 2006)
- Occupations: Teacher, professor, activist
- Known for: Transgender activism
- Spouses: Patty Costello (m. 1979, divorced)

Steve Dain (July 9, 1939 – October 10, 2007) was an American educator and activist who fought to keep his job as a schoolteacher after receiving gender-affirming surgery. Following his legal battle with the school district and his resignation in 1978, which was covered in the national press, he became an advocate for transgender rights and a mentor to other trans men.

== Early life ==
Dain was born on July 9, 1939. He grew up in Oakland, CA, and attended high school at Oakland Tech, graduating in 1957. Dain attended UC Berkeley, receiving his B.A. in 1961 and his Master's degree in Physical Education and Child Development in 1963.

Dain taught at Arroyo, Mission, and Kennedy High Schools before joining the faculty of Emery High School as a Physical Education teacher in 1966.

== Transition and firing ==
Dain was a successful teacher at Emery High School, earning a "teacher of the year" award and achieving tenure, but he struggled with the distress of living as someone he was not, noting later, "I wanted to be who I was. I wanted to also fit. And to be who I was 'and' fit would not go together."

In 1976, Dain took six months' sick leave to seek gender-affirming hormone therapy and surgery at Stanford with Dr. Donald Laub, legally changed his name, and grew a beard and mustache. When he returned to Emery High that summer, community reactions were mixed, with students showing curiosity about what had happened while parents and the school superintendent raised concerns.

=== Termination and lawsuit ===
In October 1976, the school district suspended Dain on grounds of "unfitness, immoral conduct and dishonest use of sick leave". Dain sued for wrongful termination and was successfully reinstated, but the board moved to fire him for wrongful use of medical leave.

In 1978, after a two-year legal battle that drove him nearly to bankruptcy, Dain resigned in order to collect his pension. Two weeks later, an Oakland Superior Court judge ruled that he must be given a choice between the suspension or accepting an outright dismissal, which would entitle him to back pay retroactive to the day he was suspended. Dain was ultimately awarded $19,000.

== Later career and death ==
Unable to return to his teaching career, Dain worked as a tile-setter and in construction, then pursued and attained a Chiropractic Degree from Life Chiropractic College West in 1988, after which he opened a practice in Union City.

Dain then became a biology professor at Ohlone College in Fremont. He completed a Doctor of Naturopathy degree in 2006.

Dain was diagnosed with breast cancer in 2001 and died on October 10, 2007.

== Activism and mentorship ==
Dain became a reluctant but outspoken advocate for transsexual rights after appearing in news media. In 1977, he was interviewed with Christine Jorgensen by Geraldo Rivera. Dain was also featured in the 1985 HBO documentary "What Sex Am I?" directed by Lee Grant.

He gained recognition in 1978 and 1979 for attending Christmas parties hosted by Pat Montandan. The first party he is mentioned to have attended was in 1978. He was in attendance with other notable activists and public figures including Phyllis Lyon, Charlie Gain, Eldridge Cleaver, Daniel Ellsberg, Sacheen Littlefeather, and Dianne Feinstein. He attended a second Christmas party in 1979 with then-wife Patty Costello; other attendees included the activist and folksinger Joan Baez, Merla Zellerbach, Rollo May, Janet Gray Hayes, and defense attorney George T. Davis.

He was sought out as a mentor by other members of the trans community who read of his firing in the news, several recalling that his photo was the first photo of a trans man they had ever seen.

In his diaries, activist Lou Sullivan describes reading about Dain in the Los Angeles Times and writes that when the two met in 1979, Dain encouraged Sullivan to proceed with transitioning. The two stayed in contact until Sullivan's death in 1991.

Poet Jamison Green met Dain at a gathering hosted by Sullivan, and wrote about him in his book Becoming a Visible Man: "He did not [transition] because being a man was somehow better than being a woman, but because it was the only thing he could do to be himself."

Writer Max Wolf Valerio met Dain after Green, and notes, "In those days, most trans men in the Bay area went off on a pilgrimage to meet him as we entered medical transition. [...] It was nearly a ritual, a rite of passage to meet with Steve."

== Apologies and honors ==
Dain received an official posthumous apology from the Emery School Board in 2021, stating: "We regret the harmful actions taken by the district at that time. Mr. Dain was right to expect to return to his job."

The Emeryville City Council renamed the street that the gym faces in Dain's honor.
