= Megan Rohrer =

American activist for homeless and LGBTQ+ rights (born 1980)

The Reverend Megan Rohrer
- Fifth bishop of the Sierra Pacific Synod
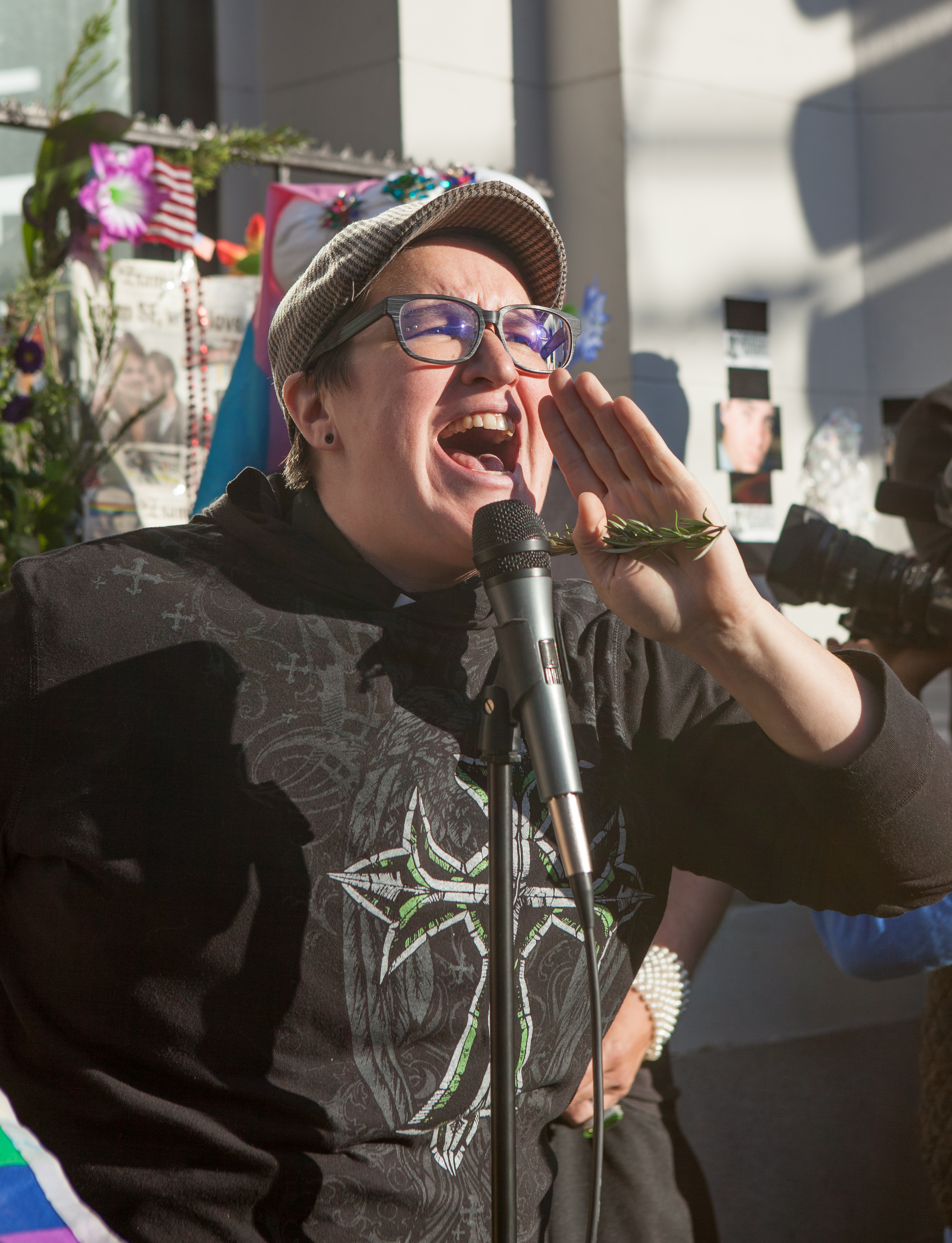
- Rohrer in 2017
- Church: Evangelical Lutheran Church in America
- Elected: 2021
- Term ended: 2022
- Predecessor: Mark W. Holmerud
- Successor: Interim Claire S. Burkat

Orders
- Ordination: 2006

Personal details
- Born: April 3, 1980 (age 46) Sioux Falls, South Dakota, US
- Denomination: Lutheran
- Spouse: Laurel Rohrer
- Occupation: former Lutheran bishop; activist
- Education: Augustana University; Pacific School of Religion

Megan Rohrer (born 1980) is an American activist for homeless and LGBTQ+ rights and former Lutheran bishop. Rohrer is the first openly transgender minister ordained in the Lutheran tradition and a successful author and finalist for the Lambda Literary Award in 2012 for "Letters For My Brothers: Transitional Wisdom in Retrospect." As an historian, Rohrer has written the book San Francisco's Transgender District. Following his reception as a minister in the Evangelical Lutheran Church in America (ELCA) in 2010, he served the church as bishop of its Sierra Pacific Synod from 2021 until June 2022.

Rohrer has been profiled in international and national outlets including CBS News, BBC, and the San Francisco Chronicle. His 2025 book on San Francisco’s Transgender District was described as a significant contribution to preserving trans history and cultural memory.

== Early life and education ==
Rohrer was born on April 3, 1980, in Sioux Falls, South Dakota. In 1998, he graduated from high school and enrolled at Augustana University to study religion. In college he came out as gay, and became president of the gay–straight alliance. He encountered resistance, threats, and attempted "cures" by fellow students for his sexuality. Rohrer graduated from Augustana in 2001.

Rohrer moved to the San Francisco Bay Area in 2002 to continue his studies. By this time he had come to identify as transgender. Rohrer attended Pacific Lutheran Theological Seminary before transferring to the Pacific School of Religion (PSR) in Berkeley, California, earning a Master of Divinity degree from PSR in 2005 and a Doctor of Ministry degree in 2016. In 2024, Rohrer successfully defended his Ph.D. dissertation titled "Trans The*logy Without Apology." His Ph.D. is in transformative studies through the California Institute of Integral Studies and his dissertation was later published through Wilgefortis Press.

== Activism and advocacy ==
In 2000, Rohrer worked at the Children's Home Society in Sioux Falls.

Rohrer formed the San Francisco LGBTQ Meetup to organize support for the homeless. "We can’t cure homelessness," said Rohrer. "But we can still be present and be visible out in our community. That was a big part of why we wanted to start having these gatherings." Rohrer has helped the homeless in San Francisco, serving as the executive director of The Welcome Ministry, since 2002, which programs serve the homeless and hungry by distributing sandwiches, and has participated in a night ministry with other local pastors. Rohrer has also helped to grow and distribute thousands of pounds of free food from community gardens.

Feeding people, especially seniors and people living with HIV/AIDS, has always been part of The Welcome Ministry. Rohrer managed the hot meal program and food pantry of the historic St. Francis Lutheran Church, near the Castro, in San Francisco. In 2013, the city was actively working to gentrify the Duboce Park and Castro neighborhoods, and began by attempting to close down the food program as a means to reduce homelessness.

Through Welcome, in 2015, Rohrer supported efforts in Kona, Hawaii to benefit homeless people and other low-income people with their vision needs, by making gathering resources and providers in the area to sponsor and support the initiative. At the event, three generations, Megan Rohrer, his mother, Peggy Heard, and grandmother, Darlene Audus, bathed the feet of the homeless at a washing station and applied lotion to the often cracked and ragged feet.

American mezzo-soprano Frederica von Stade, originally founded the Singers of the Street (SOS) choir, which became a project of Welcome. Singers of the Street is a choir of San Franciscans who have experienced, or are at risk of, homelessness and its mission is to raise their voices for justice, healing and joy. In 2015, Street Requium, composed by Kathleen McGuire, in collaboration with Andy Payne and Jonathon Welch, was performed by von Stade and the Singers of the Street in the Bay Area, as a means of mourning the homeless who have died as a result of being unhoused. The Bay Area Reporter interviewed Rohrer in 2016 during the first Trump Administration when speculation that the city of San Francisco could lose $1 billion in federal funding for housing services, because of his advocacy work with HIV/AIDS homelessness. In 2022, Rohrer was appointed to the Local Homeless Coordinating Board, which advises the San Francisco Department of Homelessness and Supportive Housing. Rohrer continues to serve as the co-chair of the San Francisco Local Homelessness Coordinating Board. On February 20, 2024, Rohrer's work helped secure over $50 million in federal funding for homeless individuals and domestic violence survivors.

== Ordained ministry ==
Rohrer was ordained in 2006, during a time when the ELCA did not allow LGBTQ pastors to openly serve. When the policy changed in 2009, Rohrer became the first openly transgender person to serve as a minister in the Evangelical Lutheran Church in America.

In 2010, Rohrer and six other Bay Area gay and transgender pastors were reinstated into the Evangelical Lutheran Church in America, after the national assembly voted to allow partnered gay people to serve as clergy. The pastors' churches had previously been removed from the denomination for ordaining gay and lesbian ministers who refused to adhere to the denomination's document guiding clergy conduct, "Visions and Expectations". At the time "Visions and Expectations" required that candidates for and persons on the clergy roster remain celibate outside of legal marriage and monogamous within marriage.

In 2014, Rohrer was installed as pastor of Grace Evangelical Lutheran Church in San Francisco.

In 2017, Rohrer was hired by the San Francisco Police Department as their first chaplain from the LGBTQ community.

In May 2021, Rohrer was elected bishop of the Sierra Pacific Synod of the ELCA, overseeing nearly 200 congregations across Northern California and Northern Nevada. His election marked the first time an openly transgender person held the office of bishop in the ELCA. During his tenure, he faced both recognition for advancing LGBTQ+ visibility in the church.

Rohrer resigned in June 2022 at the request of the ELCA’s presiding bishop Elizabeth Eaton. He later filed a lawsuit against the Sierra Pacific Synod alleging harassment and breach of contract; the case was settled in 2024.

Rohrer has spoken publicly about the safety risks he faced as a transgender religious leader, including wearing a bulletproof vest on some occasions at the advice of law enforcement.

He is currently on faculty at the Chaplaincy Institute, where he teaches courses on pastoral leadership, chaplaincy with marginalized communities, and care during public gatherings such as vigils and protests.

He is currently on faculty at the Chaplaincy Institute, where he teaches courses on pastoral leadership, chaplaincy with marginalized communities, and care during public gatherings such as vigils and protests.

In 2023, Rohrer appointed as Sr. Church Communications Specialist for GLIDE Memorial Church and ended his work in 2025. Subsequently, he started working at Compass Family Services as a Policy Director.

== Transgender historian ==
In 2011, Rohrer and historian Joey Plaster created a remarkable work of public history: Vanguard Revisited, which introduced the history of the 1960s radical queer-youth organization Vanguard to contemporary queer homeless youth, who created their own art and poetry zine in conversation with essays and themes from the original Vanguard newsletter.

Rohrer was recognized by Out Magazine for his work at their 20th Annual Transgender Unity Banquet, in 2012, for his historical research in Vanguard Revisited: The Queer Faith, Sex & Politics of the Youth of San Francisco's Tenderloin.

In 2015, Rohrer started a fundraiser to raise bail for Meagan Taylor, a black trans woman who was held in isolation in an Iowa jail.

Starting in 2016, Rohrer wrote a children's books series expressing LGBTQ themes to help churches who want a safe children's ministry materials for reconciling churches and diverse families.

For the 50th Anniversary of Compton's Cafeteria Riot, in 2016, Rohrer published a second issue of theVanguard Revisited zine with new materials by the original authors and editors for the Tenderloin Museum. The Tenderloin was the historical geographic center of the city’s emerging GLBT movement from the 1940s through the 1960s.

In the wake of the 2016 Oakland warehouse fire, in which at least three transgender people were killed, Rohrer was called upon by the city of Oakland to provide support and assistance to the community. During a December 2016 vigil, in the Castro, 75 people gathered in Harvey Milk Plaza to remember the loss to the transgender community and Cash Askew, a famous transgender musician who also perished at Ghost Ship. Rohrer developed the 'Elegy For Ghost Ship: An Evening of Music In Remembrance' at Grace Cathedral as a means of healing and mourning the loss of the 36 people who died. "When a tragedy happens in our community we need a lot of opportunities to mourn," Rohrer said. "When the original tragedy happens the first thing we do is mourn the victims and care for the survivors. Then we attend to the people who may have had similar tragedies in their lives and who might be affected by seeing this in the news media." Rohrer also noted that first responders and parents who imagine losing children in such a tragedy might also be in need of guidance and healing.

2018 was the Year of the Woman, with the Women’s March movement, which Rohrer was on the board leadership.

In 2017, Rohrer was hired as the first-ever LGBTQ+ Chaplain for the San Francisco Police Department. In 2017, working with his deeply held belief that religion should unite, not divide, us even further. As part of his work with the San Francisco Police Department, in 2019, Rohrer advocated for then Police Chief William Scott to apologize on behalf of the Police Department, to the Transgender community in San Francisco, at the 53rd anniversary of the Compton's Cafeteria riot, which predated the Stonewall riots in New York by 3 years. This truth and reconciliation event occurred at Glide Memorial Church which has long been a place of advocacy for the Transgender District, especially in the 1960s through 1980s.

As the Trump Administration announced in 2017 that transgender people would be banned from serving in the military, Rohrer led protests to advocate for the rights of transgender active military and veterans.

In 2017, during the San Francisco Trans March, organizers discouraged participants from interacting with police officers providing security, citing concerns about police conduct toward BIPOC transgender people. As SFPD chaplain, Rohrer noted that some officers volunteered because he identified as LGBTQ and wished to support the event. Rohrer stated that his role as a transgender chaplain was intended to encourage reporting of hate crimes and domestic violence.

In late June 2016, people gathered to at 18th and Castro streets to remember the lives of the tragic mass shooting at the Pulse nightclub in Orlando, Florida that took the lives of 49 people with a memorial of flowers, photos and cards. One year later, on June 12, 2017, Rev. Rohrer spoke to over 100 people to remember the anniversary.

Rohrer has advocated for trans people who would be negatively impacted by proposed "bathroom bills" that seek to restrict restroom usage based on sex assigned at birth.

In 2021, Rohrer shared his experiences of being a pastor during the COVID-19 pandemic, and advocated for LGBTQ community members to get vaccinated.

In August 2025, Rohher published a new book, San Francisco's Transgender District.

His 2025 book Images of America: San Francisco’s Transgender District documents more than a century of transgender history in the city, drawing on archival collections, oral histories, and the experiences of community elders.

Rohrer has conducted historical research on San Francisco’s Tenderloin, one of the first neighborhoods in the world to have a legally recognized transgender cultural district.

In discussing the project, Rohrer has emphasized that uncovering early photographs and stories of transgender communities allowed him to situate present-day activism within a much longer lineage. He has described the work as offering “a storied family tree” to contemporary trans communities, making archival materials more accessible to the public through libraries and bookstores. The book highlights how events such as the 1906 earthquake reshaped the Tenderloin, opening space for housing that became home to transgender and gender-nonconforming people.

Rohrer’s work also foregrounds the voices of trans elders, including figures like Ms. Billie Cooper, and situates their stories within ongoing struggles for safety and recognition. He has argued that documenting histories of resilience and joy provides a blueprint for contemporary resistance at a time when transgender rights remain contested.

=== Work on Lou Sullivan ===
Rohrer has contributed to the preservation and interpretation of the legacy of Lou Sullivan, a gay trans man, activist, and founder of FTM International.

As part of this work, Rohrer curated the OutHistory exhibit and online timeline Man-i-fest, which presents Sullivan’s correspondence, photographs, and writings. The project highlights Sullivan’s role in FTM community-building and his contributions to trans activism in San Francisco between 1976 and 2009. By situating Sullivan’s personal experiences within broader historical and activist contexts, Rohrer’s curation emphasizes the importance of mentorship, community networks, and archival preservation in shaping transgender history.

== Scholarly work ==
His works include Images of America: San Francisco’s Transgender District (Arcadia Publishing, 2025), a photographic history of transgender and gender-nonconforming communities in San Francisco; Trans Theology Without Apology (2025), which was a finalist for the International Impact Book Awards in the category of Author of the Year in LGBTQ Non-fiction; This Is My Body: Hearing the Theology of Transgender Christians (2010); and Queerly Lutheran (2008).

In addition to books, Rohrer has contributed to scholarly literature across history, feminist studies, theology, and ethics. His research has examined the experiences of LGBTQ homeless youth in San Francisco, the history of Polk Street’s queer communities, and the rhetorical legacy of Lou Sullivan, a pioneering trans historian and activist.

He has also published on feminist pedagogy, archival ethics, and Christian medical ethics. More recently, his work has explored transgender history in San Francisco’s Tenderloin district through ecological and archival perspectives.

These studies have appeared in peer-reviewed outlets such as Radical History Review, The Public Historian, Peitho Journal of Feminist Scholarship, Journal of Critical Library and Information Studies, and other academic collections.

In 2025, Rohrer’s book Trans Theology Without Apology was recognized as a finalist for Author of the Year in LGBTQ Non-fiction at the International Impact Book Awards.

== Views and opinions ==
Rohrer’s writings and public statements reflect a commitment to expanding theological conversations to include transgender and queer perspectives. In works such as Queerly Lutheran and Trans Theology Without Apology, he has argued that Christian theology should embrace the lived experiences of LGBTQ people and challenge exclusionary interpretations of scripture. His theological approach emphasizes embodiment, inclusion, and the recognition of diverse gender identities within faith communities.

He has also highlighted the importance of pastoral care for marginalized groups, particularly LGBTQ homeless youth in San Francisco, and has advocated for faith communities to adopt practices that reduce bias and promote equity.

== Personal life ==
Rohrer claims to be related to Nicholas of Flüe in the 16th generation. His book The Way to Flüeli-Ranft: A Pilgrimage to the Land of Brother Klaus the Patron Saint of Switzerland talks about both his trip to visit the home of Nicholas of Flue, the Bruder Klaus Museum and includes his genealogical connection to the saint, stories about the saint and some of his personal experiences as a bishop and in the days following. Rohrer goes by he/him pronouns.

== Awards, honors, and recognition ==
- 2010 – OutHistory.org “Since Stonewall Local Histories Contest” First Place for “Man-i-fest: FTM Mentorship in San Francisco from 1976 – 2009" featuring the life and work of Lou Sullivan
- 2011 – Honorary Doctorate, Palo Alto University
- 2012 – Lambda Literary Award finalist, transgender nonfiction
- 2012 – "Pastor Megan Rohrer Day" declared on August 12 by the San Francisco Board of Supervisors
- 2014 – Honorable Mention, Unsung Hero of Compassion (awarded by the Dalai Lama)
- 2014 – Award of Merit for Zanderology: Disability 101 (director), International Film Festival for Spirituality, Religion, and Visionary
- 2015 – Distinguished Alumni/ae, Pacific School of Religion
- 2015 – Soldier of Social Change, San Francisco Magazine
- 2017 – Recognized by the San Francisco Board of Supervisors as an LBGT Leader in San Francisco
- 2017 Bay Area Reporter #ChangeMaker Recognition
- 2025 LGBTQ Non-fiction at the International Impact Book Awards for Trans Theology Without Apology.

== Publications ==
Through Grace Lutheran Church and Wilgefortis Press, Rohrer has written a number of books for children in the Good News Children's Book Series.

=== Children books ===
- Rohrer, Megan (2016). The Radical Jesus Story. Lulu Enterprises Incorporated. ISBN 9781365182563.
- Rohrer, Megan (2016). Mr Grumpy Christian. Lulu Enterprises Incorporated. ISBN 9781329946873.
- Rohrer, Megan (2016). Is it a Boy, Girl or Both. Lulu.com. ISBN 9781329925601.
- Rohrer, Megan (2016). The Children's Crumbs. Lulu Enterprises Incorporated. ISBN 9781329922198.
- Rohrer, Megan (2016). The Parable of the Succulent. Lulu Enterprises Incorporated. ISBN 9781329913790.
- Rohrer, Megan (2016). The Fabulous Creation Story. LULU Press. ISBN 9781365201462.
- Rohrer, Megan (2016). Too Sick For Church. Lulu Press, Incorporated. ISBN 9781365188725.
- Rohrer, Megan (2016). Jesus' Family. Lulu Press, Incorporated. ISBN 9781329956681.
- Rohrer, Megan (2022). Magnificats: inspired by herchurch.org. ISBN 9781387464012.
- Rohrer, Megan; Ivanov, Eugene (2016). Never Again. Lulu Press, Incorporated. ISBN 9781329948075.
- Rohrer, Megan; Drda, Daren (2016). What to wear to church?. Lulu Enterprises Incorporated. ISBN 9781329907409.
- Rohrer, Megan; Woodward, Daren (2016). Transgender Children of God. Wilgefortis Press. ISBN 9781365112959.
- Rohrer, Megan; Elena, Dobrynina (2016). Church Bugs. Lulu Enterprises Incorporated. ISBN 9781329970649.
- Rohrer, Megan; Ryan, Pamela; Maryia, Ihnatovich (2016). Faithful Families. Lulu Enterprises Incorporated. ISBN 9781329970649.
- Rohrer, Megan; cosmaa (2020). Sacred ADA Upgrades. ISBN 9781716691713.
- Rohrer, Megan; Long, Mary (2020). Sacred Grief. ISBN 9781716697654.
- Rohrer, Megan; Kurniawan, Rahmad (2020). Sacred Anger. ISBN 9781716715013.
- Rohrer, Megan; Paetzold, Franzi (2020). Sacred Sheltering. ISBN 9781716719776.
- Rohrer, Megan; Matyash, Olga (2020). This is My Body. ISBN 9781716712043.
- Rohrer, Megan; Vortniak, Svetlana (2022). Baby Jesus By and By. Lulu Press.
- Rohrer, Megan; Ramonfaur, Bernardo (2022). Justice Thou Art.
- Rohrer, Megan; Mazur, Eve (2022). Sacred Trees. ISBN 9781387466245.
- Rohrer, Megan; Rohrer, Dominique; Rohrer, Makayla (2022). Fart Town:The People are Nice, But the Air is Bad. Wilgefortis. ISBN 9798582166825.

=== Books and illustrations ===
- Rohrer, Megan (2016). Faith, Hope and Love Adult Coloring Book. Lulu.com. ISBN 9781329952072.
- Rohrer, Megan (2016). Love: Faithful Adult Coloring Book. Lulu.com. ISBN 9781365110856.

Adult titles authored by Rohrer:

- Rohrer, Megan (2012). Queerly Lutheran. Lulu.com. ISBN 9781365105265.
- Rohrer, Megan (2014). Holy Night: Prayers and Meditations for People of the Night. Lulu.com. ISBN 9781312256903.
- Rohrer, Megan (2014). With a Day Like Yours, Couldn't You Use a Little Grace?. Lulu.com. ISBN 9781312422391.
- Rohrer, Megan (2018). The Chaplain's Heart: An Embodied Guide to Ministry of Presence. Lulu.com. ISBN 9780359260171.
- Rohrer, Megan (2018). The Sacred Waters: How to Accept Blessings When They Find You. Lulu.com. ISBN 9780359228997.
- Rohrer, Megan (2018). Prayers from Norway: Untangling Our Shame of Body, Mind and Politics. Lulu.com. ISBN 9780359006793.
- Rohrer, Megan (2018). The Progressive Combined Parish Registry: Gender neutral language for churches. Lulu Press. ISBN 9781387897704.
- Rohrer, Megan (2018). Prayers from Iceland. Lulu Press. ISBN 9781387736454.
- Rohrer, Megan (2019). Prayers from Philadelphia: Life, Liberty and the Pursuit of Happiness. Lulu Press, Incorporated. ISBN 9781794838765.
- Rohrer, Megan (2019). Prayers from the Caribbean: Injury, Struggle and Liberation. Lulu.com. ISBN 9780359556816.
- Rohrer, Megan (2022). The Way to Flüeli-Ranft: A Pilgrimage to the Land of Brother Klaus the Patron Saint of Switzerland. ISBN 9781387736041.
- Rohrer, Megan (2025). San Francisco's Transgender District. Arcadia Publishing. ISBN 9781467162654

=== Co-Authored books ===
- Rohrer, Megan; Plaster, Joey (2012). Vanguard Revisited: The Queer Faith, Sex & Politics of The Youth of San Francisco's Tenderloin. Wilgefortis. ISBN 9781365105265.
- Rohrer, Megan; Kapros Rohrer, Laurel (2018). New Wonders: Lessons Learned at the End of a Long Winding Road. Lulu.com. ISBN 9781387744626.
- Rohrer, Megan; Strouse, Susan (2019). Progressive Hymns. LULU Press. ISBN 9780359940561.
- Rohrer, Megan; Strouse, Susan (2022). The Chaplain's Gut: An Embodied Guide to Holy Anger. Lulu.com. ISBN 9781387855223.

=== Edited books ===
- Rohrer, Megan (2014). Holy Night: Prayers and Meditations for People of the Night: Friends of the San Francisco Night Ministry. Lulu.com. ISBN 9781312256903.
- Rohrer, Megan; Keig, Zander (2014). Manifest: Letters For My Brothers: Transitional Wisdom in Retrospect. Lulu.com. ISBN 9781312461147.
- Rohrer, Megan; Tisdale, Daniel (2014). Bible Stories: Reimagining Between the Lines. ISBN 9781312379374.
- Rohrer, Megan; Keig, Zander (2016). Manifest: Transitional Wisdom on Male Privilege. Lulu.com. ISBN 9781365276828.
