= First United Lutheran Church =

First United Lutheran Church San Francisco, CA
- Sanctuary of First United Lutheran Church 1890-1944; Reflective. Open. Passionate. Daring. Playful. Engaged.
- First United Lutheran Church; San Francisco, CA
- 37.7789°N 122.4434°W
- Location: 2097 Turk Street (at Lyon); San Francisco, California
- Denomination: Evangelical Lutheran Church in America
- Website: www.FULC.com

Clergy
- Pastor: Rev. Anders Peterson

First United Lutheran Church is a congregation of the Evangelical Lutheran Church in America (ELCA), located in San Francisco, California. Formed in 1886 as the Women's Memorial Church, it was the first Lutheran congregation in California to use English as its primary language for worship. In 1990, First United was suspended, and later expelled from the ELCA for ordaining an openly gay pastor, against the wishes of the denomination. The ELCA Churchwide Assembly voted to approve openly gay clergy in 2009, and in 2012, First United rejoined the denomination. Presently a "church without walls," First United meets in St. Cyprian's Episcopal Church, located at 2097 Turk Street, near the main campus of the University of San Francisco.

== History ==
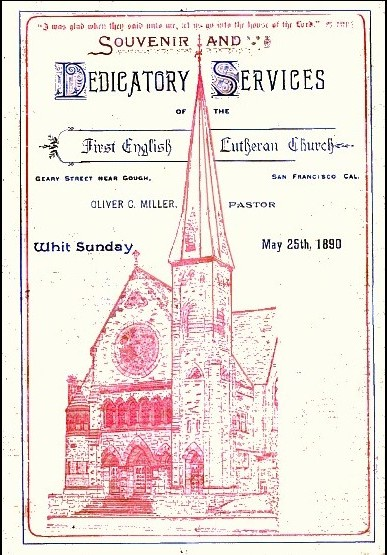
Bulletin Cover from the 1890 Dedicatory Service

=== Women's Memorial Church ===
In February 1886, the Women's Home and Foreign Missionary Society of the Lutheran General Synod sent the Rev. Oliver C. Miller of Cedar Rapids, Iowa to San Francisco to organize the first Lutheran congregation in California to use English as its primary language for worship. On June 13, 1886 a congregation of 39 members formed and began to meet in Irving Hall at 139 Post Street in San Francisco. The congregation's first name was Women's Memorial Church.

On May 25, 1890, a new church building was dedicated on Geary Boulevard between Octavia Street and Gough Street (now the site of St. Mary's Cathedral). This two-story stone structure escaped extensive damage during the 1906 earthquake and fire. Historical records show approximately $3,100 spent to repair the building, most of it coming as a gift from Lutherans on the east coast. The homes of many members were destroyed. Records show that the Sunday following the quake only 25 members attended church.

In September 1944 the congregation voted to sell the Gough Street church to the Seventh-day Adventist Church for $53,500 and relocate to San Francisco's Richmond District. There they purchased land on the corner of 30th Avenue and Geary Boulevard for the construction of a new sanctuary.

=== First United Lutheran Church ===
In 1946 the congregation changed its name to First United Lutheran Church and began renting space for worship in Alexandria Hall on 18th Avenue until the new church was constructed. The new sanctuary was dedicated on January 22, 1950.

Newspaper clipping from the San Francisco News in 1953

In 2007, the congregation voted to pursue its mission by becoming a "church without walls", and sold the property at 6555 Geary Blvd. to the Ta Kioh Buddhist Temple. First United had its first worship service at First Unitarian Universalist Chapel at 6:00 p.m. on October 28, 2007--Reformation Sunday—just a block away from the original church location on Geary between Octavia & Gough. In the summer of 2012, the congregation changed locations once again, and currently worships at St. Cyprian's Episcopal Church in San Francisco's North of the Panhandle neighborhood.

The congregation of First United has belonged to various Lutheran synods and denominations during its history. It was founded as a part of the Evangelical Lutheran General Synod of the United States of North America (General Synod), and was one of five parishes instrumental in organizing the California Synod of this church body in 1891. In 1918 the General Synod merged with two other national church bodies to form the United Lutheran Church in America (ULCA). First United was a part of the Pacific Southwest Synod of the United Lutheran Church until 1963 when the denomination merged with three other church bodies to become the Lutheran Church in America (LCA). In 1988, First United became a member of the Evangelical Lutheran Church in America (ELCA), and continued its membership until December 1995.

In 1990, the ELCA suspended First United from membership for ordaining Jeff Johnson, an openly gay pastor, against the wishes of the denomination. At the same time, St. Francis Lutheran Church in San Francisco was suspended for ordaining two openly lesbian pastors, Ruth Frost and Phyllis Zillhart. On December 31, 1995, First United and St. Francis were expelled from the ELCA for this action. Both congregations continued operating as independent Lutheran churches affiliated with the San Francisco Conference of Lutheran Churches.

Then in 2009, leaders of the Evangelical Lutheran Church in America voted to change bylaws by adopting a constitution that allows openly gay men and lesbians to serve as pastors. Following that change, ELCA leaders asked the San Francisco churches for forgiveness, and invited them to rejoin the denomination.

St. Francis rejoined the ELCA in 2011. First United, after 16½ years on its own, voted unanimously to rejoin the denomination on July 15, 2012, marking the occasion in a Service of Healing & Reconciliation on October 14, 2012 with Sierra Pacific Synod Bishop Mark W. Holmerud as preacher and Rev. Jeff Johnson as celebrant.

== Worship ==
First United Lutheran Church 1950-2007

While maintaining the fundamentally Lutheran elements of the traditional mass, the community of First United finds richness, vitality and spiritual renewal in using a variety of forms and musical settings in worship celebrations. Musical settings, therefore, often change with the various seasons of the church year. Frequently new or different settings are employed within a season or for special celebrations, including its own setting of Lutheran liturgy, the Mass of a United People. Written by the musicians of First United, the setting uses a variety of elements including the spoken word, flute, organ, drums, guitar, piano, and styles ranging from a cappella plainchant to folk to soft jazz/rock. First used in Advent 2000, the Mass of a United People was dedicated to Reverends Donna Duensing and Robert Smith for their dedicated service to the First United Family.

First United is a community that values inclusion in many aspects, especially forms of worship. Yet, Lutheran tradition and heritage are important, as well. Inclusion, however, is interpreted in expansive terms that provide for the intention of inclusion, even when the chosen forms may appear to contradict this very principle. Traditional hymns composed of language from a different era and seemingly exclusive are sometimes used. The community believes that these hymns hold their own power of inclusion because they connect the worshiper not only to their Christian and Lutheran roots but also to many people across the wide expanse of God's family who have shared and continue to share these same hymns.

Occasionally prayers are offered in which God is addressed as Lord or Lover, Father or Mother, Creator or Spirit, or even Goddess. First United strongly holds to the tenet that God is not limited even though language is; the names change, the truth remains the same. They understand words to be products of time and history, the context in which God is encountered. At the same time, they understand that God is timeless. Worshipers are welcomed to add their own ways and means of calling forth the divine love that unites them.

== Community ==
The First United Lutheran Church has funded nonreligious community programs such as Middle Circle, a nonprofit organization.
