= Robert H. Smith =

Robert H. Smith may refer to:

- Robert H. Smith (philanthropist) (1928–2009), American builder and developer who developed much of the Crystal City, Virginia neighborhood just south of Washington, D.C.
- Robert H. Smith (theologian) (1932–2006), American Lutheran clergyman, theologian, author and lecturer
- Robert H. Smith (naval officer) (1898–1943), United States Navy submariner for whom the destroyer/minelayer USS Robert H. Smith was named
- Robert Haldane Smith, Baron Smith of Kelvin (born 1944), British businessman, governor of the BBC
- Robert Hall Smith (1888–1960), American railroad executive, president of the Norfolk and Western Railway, 1946–1958
- Robert Hardy Smith (1813–1878), Alabama politician and officer of the Confederate States Army during the American Civil War
- Robert Harrison Smith (1848–1911), member of both the Queensland Legislative Council and the Queensland Legislative Assembly
- Sir Robert Hill Smith, 3rd Baronet (born 1958), Liberal Democrat politician and MP for West Aberdeenshire and Kincardine
- Robert Holbrook Smith (1879–1950), American physician and surgeon who co-founded Alcoholics Anonymous

== See also ==
- Robert H. T. Smith (born 1935), Australian-Canadian professor of geography
