= Sierra Pacific =

Sierra Pacific may refer to:

- Sierra Pacific Airlines, an airline based in Tucson, Arizona
- Sierra Pacific Industries, a forest products company based in California
- Sierra Pacific Synod, a council of the Evangelical Lutheran Church in America covering parts of California and Nevada
- Sierra Pacific Power Company, a Nevada-based public utility and precursor to NV Energy

== See also ==
- Pacific sierra, a fish in the mackerel family
