= Lou Sullivan =

American author and transgender activist (1951–1991)

- Born: June 16, 1951; Wauwatosa, Wisconsin, U.S.
- Died: March 2, 1991 (aged 39); San Francisco, California, U.S.
- Occupations: Author, activist, historian
- Organization(s): FTM International; GLBT Historical Society
- Known for: Transgender activism
- Notable work: "From Female to Male: The Life of Jack Bee Garland"
- Quotations related to Lou Sullivan at Wikiquote

Louis Graydon Sullivan (June 16, 1951 – March 2, 1991) was an American author and activist known for his work on behalf of transgender men. He was the first trans man known to publicly identify as gay, and is largely responsible for the modern understanding of sexual orientation and gender identity as distinct, unrelated concepts.

Sullivan was a pioneer of the grassroots female-to-male (FTM) advocacy movement and was instrumental in helping individuals obtain peer-support, counseling, endocrinological services and reconstructive surgery outside of gender dysphoria clinics. He founded FTM International, one of the first organizations specifically for FTM individuals, and his activism and community work was a significant contributor to the rapid growth of the FTM community during the late 1980s. He died of AIDS-related complications in 1991.

== Early life ==
Sullivan was born on June 16, 1951, in Wauwatosa, Wisconsin to John Eugene Sullivan, who owned a trucking company, and Nancy Louise Sullivan, a homemaker. He grew up in Milwaukee, the third child of six in a devout Catholic family and attended Catholic primary and secondary school. Sullivan first started keeping a journal at the age of 10, describing his early childhood thoughts of being a boy, confusing adolescence, sexual fantasies of being a gay man, and his involvement in the Milwaukee music scene. During his adolescence he expressed continued confusion about his identity, writing at age 15 in 1966 that "I want to look like what I am but don't know what some one like me looks like. I mean, when people look at me I want them to think—there's one of those people [...] that has their own interpretation of happiness. That's what I am."

Sullivan was attracted to the idea of playing different gender roles, and his attraction for male roles was outlined in his writings. Specifically in his short stories, poems and diaries, he often explored the ideas of male homosexuality and gender identity. At the age of seventeen he began a relationship with a self-described "feminine" male lover, and together they would play with gender roles and gender-bending.

== Transition and adulthood ==
In 1973, Sullivan was working as a secretary in the Slavic Languages department of the University of Wisconsin-Milwaukee. He joined the Gay People's Union, which was hosted at the university, and first identified himself as a "female transvestite" by publishing an article in the group's newsletter. By 1975, Sullivan identified as a "female-to-male transsexual" and it "became apparent" that he needed to leave Milwaukee for somewhere where he could find "more understanding" and access hormones for his transition. He moved to San Francisco in 1975 with his longtime partner, a cisgender man. His family was supportive of the move and gave him "a handsome man's suit and [his] grandfather's pocket watch" as going-away presents.

Upon arrival in San Francisco, Sullivan began working as a secretary at the Wilson Sporting Good Company, where he was employed as a woman but cross-dressed as a man much of the time. In his personal life, Sullivan lived as an out gay man, but he was repeatedly denied sex reassignment surgery (SRS) because of his sexual orientation and the expectation of the time that transgender people should adopt stereotypical heterosexual opposite-sex gender roles. This rejection led Sullivan to start a campaign to remove homosexuality from the list of contraindications for SRS.

In 1976, Sullivan suffered a severe crisis of gender identity and continued living as a feminine heterosexual woman for the next three years after being rejected by a gender dysphoria program at Stanford University on the basis of Sullivan's self-declaration of being a gay man. As Sullivan tried to go through life masking and presenting effeminately, he came across the hardships of transgender teacher Steve Dain, published in newspaper spreads in 1976. In 1978, he was shaken by the death of his youngest brother.

Dain and Sullivan were able to meet in 1979, Dain encouraging Sullivan to proceed with transitioning. In 1979, Sullivan found doctors and therapists at the Institute for Advanced Study of Human Sexuality who would accept his sexuality regardless of prior university-based guidelines which prioritized declared sexual orientation over diagnostic criteria. Sullivan began taking testosterone, and had a double mastectomy surgery a year later. He then left his previous job to work as an engineering technician at the Atlantic-Ritchfield Company so that he could fully embrace his new identity as a man with new co-workers.

In 1986, Sullivan obtained genital reconstruction surgery. He was diagnosed as HIV positive shortly after his surgery, and told he only had 10 months to live. Sullivan was the first known case of a trans man developing AIDS. It is likely that Sullivan was HIV- infected in 1980, just after his chest surgery. He wrote, "I took a certain pleasure in informing the gender clinic that even though their program told me I could not live as a Gay man, it looks like I'm going to die like one." Sullivan died of AIDS-related complications on March 2, 1991.

In the book Transgender History by Susan Stryker, the end stages of Sullivan's life were recounted. Stryker wrote:

At the time his diagnosis was confirmed, survival rates for people with AIDS averaged somewhere in the vicinity of two years. Sullivan survived for five, in reasonably good health until the very end. In his final years he participated in AIDS drug trials, finished his book on Jack Garland, and continued to nurture the FTM group and Historical Society. Sullivan's final campaign, however, was to persuade HBIGDA members and the committee revisiting the definition of GID [gender identity disorder] for the next edition of the Diagnostic and Statistical Manual to drop "homosexual orientation" as a contradiction in the diagnostic criteria, which was based on the assumption that homosexual transgender people did not exist. Sullivan did not live to see that change take place in 1994, but he took comfort in knowing that his efforts were contributing to a revision of the sexological literature.

Sullivan kept a journal throughout his life. Though he had hoped to edit and publish his own diaries before his death, he was unable to, and selected excerpts were released in 2019 as We Both Laughed in Pleasure (retitled "Youngman" in the UK), edited by Ellis Martin and Zach Ozma.

== Activism and community contributions ==
In 1980, Sullivan began volunteering at the Janus Information Facility, a transgender counseling and education resource that had taken over services from the Erickson Educational Foundation in 1977. He was the first FTM peer counselor at the facility and worked directly with gender-questioning clients who were assigned female at birth (AFAB). In 1980, Sullivan published one of the first guidebooks for transgender men, "Information for the Female-to-Male Crossdresser and Transsexual", which drew on his experiences volunteering at Janus and included some of his earlier publications in the newsletter of the Gay People's Union in Milwaukee. The guidebook was re-published several times, and Sullivan worked on the third edition in his final years, calling it "the most important thing" he ever did. He also published a biography of the San Francisco-based transgender writer, Jack Bee Garland in 1990. Sullivan is also credited for being the first to discuss the eroticism of men's clothing.

=== Editor of The Gateway ===
Sullivan was active in the Golden Gate Girls/Guys organization (later called the Gateway Gender Alliance), one of the first social/educational organizations for transgender people that offered support to FTM transsexuals, and in fact successfully petitioned to add "Guys" to its name. From July 1979 to October 1980, Sullivan edited The Gateway, a newsletter with "news and information on transvestism and transsexualism" that was circulated by the Golden Gate Girls/Guys. It was originally primarily focused on the needs of MTF and transvestite readers and read "much like a small town newspaper", but under Sullivan's editing it gained more gender parity between MTF and FTM issues. According to Megan Rohrer, Sullivan "transform[ed] Gateway in a way that [would] forever change FTM mentoring" because trans people could still obtain information on how to pass without having to attend group gatherings in person.

=== GLBT Historical Society ===
Sullivan was a founding member and board member of the GLBT Historical Society (formerly the Gay and Lesbian Historical Society) in San Francisco. His personal and activist papers are preserved in the institution's archives as collection no. 1991–07; the papers are fully processed and available for use by researchers, and a finding aid is posted on the Online Archive of California. The Historical Society has displayed selected materials from Sullivan's papers in a number of exhibitions, notably "Man-i-fest: FTM Mentoring in San Francisco from 1976 to 2009," which was open through much of 2010 in the second gallery at the society's headquarters at 657 Mission St. in San Francisco, and "Our Vast Queer Past: Celebrating San Francsico's GLBT History," the debut exhibition in the main gallery at the society's GLBT History Museum that opened in January 2011 in San Francisco's Castro District.

=== FTM International ===
In 1986, Sullivan began hosting quarterly get-togethers for FTM people in San Francisco to offer resources, education, and community. In the early days of the group, attendees were screened by Sullivan, either through mail, telephone, or in-person interviews, to ensure confidentiality. The newsletter of the group, simply called The FTM Newsletter, was first sent out in September 1987, and would become a leading source of information for FTM people across the world, with letters and anecdotes published from men in places including the Netherlands, the United Kingdom, and New Zealand. The newsletter helped to disseminate vital information about medical treatments, overlapping language use, and shared cultural experiences. Under Sullivan's leadership, the get-togethers comprised a racially and sexually diverse membership, and were first modeled after other transgender social groups, taking place in bars and restaurant locations, but ultimately moving in 1990 to the Metropolitan Community Church in the Castro District. In February 1991, shortly before his death, Sullivan made plans for Jamison Green, an early member of the group, to take over the publication. The day after his death, a previously scheduled meeting became a makeshift memorial, attended by community members and friends, including Kate Bornstein. Over $400 was donated in his honor to help continue the publication of the FTM Newsletter and to pay rent for the meeting space. The group would later become known as FTM International, and in 2007, became the Lou Sullivan Society, the oldest continuing FTM group in the world.

=== Lobbying for recognition of gay trans men ===
Lou was a writer and capable of standing up for what he saw as truth. He was a gay transsexual man, before this was even allowed or recognized. He is also the person who helped to change that, and now—being gay is no longer an issue if you want to begin transition.

— Max Wolf Valerio

Sullivan is remembered as being instrumental in demonstrating the existence of trans men who were themselves attracted to men, which he did by lobbying the American Psychiatric Association and the World Professional Association for Transgender Health. He was determined to change people's attitudes towards trans gay men but also to change the medical process of transition by removing sexual orientation from the criteria of gender identity disorder so that trans men who are gay could also access hormones and surgery, essentially making the process "orientation blind". Through his work at the Janus Information Facility, Sullivan was connected to trained psychiatrists and psychotherapists like Walter Bockting, Ira B. Pauly, and Paul A. Walker, who utilized his knowledge in their clinical research and invited him to medical conferences.

== Honors ==
In June 2019, Sullivan was one of the inaugural fifty American "pioneers, trailblazers, and heroes" inducted on the National LGBTQ Wall of Honor within the Stonewall National Monument (SNM) in New York City's Stonewall Inn. The SNM is the first U.S. national monument dedicated to LGBTQ rights and history, and the wall's unveiling was timed to take place during the 50th anniversary of the Stonewall riots.

In August 2019, Sullivan was one of the honorees inducted in the Rainbow Honor Walk, a walk of fame in San Francisco's Castro neighborhood noting LGBTQ people who have "made significant contributions in their fields".

In 2017, Brice Smith published a biography of Sullivan, Lou Sullivan: Daring to Be a Man Among Men.

== Works ==
- "A Transvestite Answers a Feminist" in Gay People's Union News (1973)
- "Looking Towards Transvestite Liberation" in Gay People's Union News (1974)
- Female to Male Cross Dresser and Transsexual (1980)
- Information for the Female to Male Cross Dresser and Transsexual (1990)
- From Female To Male: The Life of Jack Bee Garland (1990)
- We Both Laughed in Pleasure: The Selected Diaries of Lou Sullivan 1961-1991. (2019). Edited by Ellis Martin and Zach Ozma
