= Jack Bee Garland =

Transgender American writer (1869–1936)

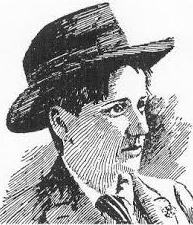
- Garland in 1897
- Born: 9 December 1869; San Francisco, California
- Died: 19 September 1936 (aged 66); San Francisco, California
- Occupations: Journalist, author
- Known for: Military service in the Philippine–American War

Jack Bee Garland (9 December 1869 – 19 September 1936) also known as Elvira Virginia Mugarrieta, Babe Bean, Jack Beam, Jack Maines, and Beebe Beam, was an author, nurse and adventurer. Garland was assigned female at birth but lived as a man in San Francisco's Tenderloin District, and had erotic relationships with young men he met there, making him a notable early example of both a trans man, as well as a trans man attracted to other men.

== Life and career ==
=== As Babe Bean ===
Born in San Francisco, California to a father who was a military officer serving as Mexican consul to San Francisco, Garland took residence in 1897 in Stockton, California. Using the name Babe Bean and pretending to be mute, Garland got a job with The Stockton Evening Mail writing stories that focused on social problems such as gambling and vagrancy.

=== As Beebe Beam ===
On October 5, 1899, Garland adopted the male identity of Beebe Beam and accompanied United States Army forces to the Philippines in 1899 to participate in the Philippine War for a year, writing, "I saw war and I lived it." Beam was a cabin boy on the troop transport City of Para to pay the way to the Philippines. Beam became sick on the journey and was set ashore after the captain found out about Beam's sex. The enlisted soldiers took up a collection to buy a ticket. When the captain would not allow Beam back on the ship, the soldiers gave Beam a uniform and hid Beam until they were safely away from Hawaii. Beam was discovered again and confined, but, dressed as a soldier, Beam escaped and followed the regiments to their Philippine garrisons. Beam served as a Spanish language interpreter and nurse, living in military camps with the Sixteenth, Twenty-Ninth, Forty-Second, and Forty-Fifth United States Volunteer Infantry regiments. During that time in the Philippines, Beam did not participate in combat, but witnessed the Battle of San Mateo and joined several marches throughout Luzon. Beam accompanied United States military forces to Santa Cruz, Laguna de Bey, Camarines, and Caloccan, as well as Manila and smaller garrisons.

Beam spent almost a year in the Philippines before returning to the United States. On October 21, 1900, Beam published "My Life as a Soldier", in the San Francisco Examiner Magazine. Although Beam never enlisted and did not participate in combat, Beam marketed the story as a woman soldier in the Philippines.

During World War I, Beam was arrested in December 1917 at Seal Beach as a German spy.

=== As Jack Bee Garland ===
Shortly after publishing the Philippine adventure, Beam abandoned newspaper writing and assumed the identity Jack Bee Garland, Garland having been their mothers maiden name, and lived under this identity as a man until death. Jack Garland was committed to social work with the American Red Cross and other charitable organizations.

Garland died of peritonitis in San Francisco on September 19, 1936. The hospital discovered Garland's biological sex, provoking a series of newspaper articles. Garland had a tattoo that showed an American flag under the word Manila alongside an infantry insignia. Newspapers suggested that Garland should be buried with military honors as a veteran, and Garland's sister, Victoria Shadbourne, perpetuated the idea by suggesting that Beebe Beam had been a lieutenant in the United States Army. No record of that service existed, and Garland was denied a military burial. Garland is buried at Cypress Lawn Memorial Park in Colma, California. Section: F Lot: LOT 688 in an unmarked grave within the Mugarrieta family plot.

Trans man Lou Sullivan has written a detailed biography of Garland.
