= Max Wolf Valerio =

American poet and writer (born 1957)

- Born: February 16, 1957 (age 69); Heidelberg, Germany
- Education: University of Colorado, Naropa University
- Writing career
- Genres: Poetry; essays; memoirs
- Subject: LGBT culture
- Notable work: The Testosterone Files (2006)

Max Wolf Valerio (born February 16, 1957) is an American poet, memoir writer, essayist and actor whose work focuses on the experiences of transgender men.

Valerio's 2006 memoir The Testosterone Files, in which he describes his own transition, was a finalist for the 2007 Lambda Literary Award for Transgender Literature. He is also the author of poetry collection Manning Up: Transsexual Men on Finding Brotherhood, Family and Themselves and contributions to several anthologies, and has been recognized as one of the earliest known transgender poets to publish in the United States. Valerio has been featured in multiple documentaries and films about gender identity and transgender experiences.

== Early life and education ==
Valerio was born on February 16, 1957, at a US Army hospital in Heidelberg, Germany. His father, who is Hispano from Taos, New Mexico, served in the United States Army for 20 years, which caused their family to move frequently in the United States and Europe. His mother is of Blackfoot descent, specifically from the Kainai in Alberta, Canada.

Valerio has researched his heritage and inferred that a significant number of his paternal ancestors were crypto-Jews who had become conversos but secretly handed on Sephardic Jewish traditions. Valerio is a Treaty Indian and also enrolled in the Kainai Band (Blood Band), Treaty 7, in Alberta Canada. His mother (née Shade) is from the Kainai Reserve, also known as the Blood Reserve. The Kainai are members of the Blackfoot Confederacy.

As a child and teenager, Valerio lived in US states including Maryland, Washington, California, Kansas, Oklahoma, and Colorado, as well as in Canada and Germany.

While growing up, Valerio had difficulty relating to girls and felt that he did not fit in because of his masculine nature. He could not imagine himself growing into a woman and always identified with male children and adults. As a teenager, he decided to identify himself as a lesbian because it made the most sense to him at the time.

In the 1970s, Valerio attended the University of Colorado, where he began reading poetry related to lesbian feminism and women's liberation. He then studied at Naropa University with poet Allen Ginsberg and Buddhist master Chögyam Trungpa. He came out as a lesbian feminist in college in 1975, though he could not relate to lesbian sex and started to feel more male.

== Transition and adulthood ==
Valerio emerged as a punk poet and artist during the 1970s and 1980s, while based in San Francisco. In 1988, after discussions with a friend and roommate who was transitioning from male to female, he realized that he was transsexual and began to consider a sex change.

Valerio's initial exposure to text resources on transsexual topics were books The Transsexual Empire (1979) by Janice Raymond and Female-to-Male Transsexualism (1983) by Leslie Lothstein, both of which are regarded by LGBTQ+ groups and contemporary transgender scholars as exceptionally transphobic. He then found the FTM Organization, run by Lou Sullivan, and started attending meetings. Valerio was amazed by the other female-to-male trans people he met and started to identify as a trans man. He also sought mentorship and validation from Steve Dain, a trans man whose transition and ensuing legal battle had been covered in the national press.

In 1989, Valerio initiated his transition from female to male. He subsequently documented the first five years of his transition in his 2006 memoir, The Testosterone Files: My Hormonal and Social Transformation from Female to Male.

=== Political views and activism ===
When Valerio identified himself as a lesbian, he was able to learn about the idea of feminism and, through the lens of both lesbian feminism and punk, developed an understanding of other types of left-wing radical politics.

Valerio was a part of the American Indian Movement and visited the Pine Ridge Reservation while it was under siege during the Wounded Knee Occupation.

== Publications ==
=== Poetry and writing ===
Prior to his transition, Valerio contributed meditations on Indigenous butch identity to the 1981 feminist anthology This Bridge Called My Back and published a chapbook of experimental poetry titled Animal Magnetism in 1984. Valerio has since been recognized as one of the earliest known transgender poets to publish in the United States and one of the earliest trans Indigenous people writing in English.

In 2006, Valerio published a memoir chronicling the first five years of his transition, entitled The Testosterone Files: My Hormonal and Social Transformation from Female to Male. This is the first book published by a transgender Indigenous person.

=== Memoir (The Testosterone Files) ===
Valerio's 2006 memoir The Testosterone Files: My Hormonal and Social Transformation from Female to Male describes the psychological, physiological, and social transformation that occurred in the first five years of his transition from female to male. One of the main themes of the book is the role of testosterone in his transition. Valerio describes the counselling he received, his experiences with hormone therapy, and the physical changes he observed. The book is organized into three parts: "Beginning," "Before Testosterone," and "After Testosterone."

==== Plot ====
In the prologue, Valerio uses an in-depth narration of what it is like to be a transsexual to allow his readers to understand the trials and tribulations that one experiences when going through a sex change. Valerio says that transsexuals are not simply just a branch of lesbian or gay. He asserts that "transsexual identities must be defined and expressed on our own terms". In Valerio's opinion, transsexuals' voices and experiences, until more recently, are "unheard and incompletely imagined".

The first section, "Beginning", describes Valerio as he begins his transition from female to male. Valerio discusses the physical changes occurring that have allowed him to understand what it feels like to experience 'biological' masculinity. These include physical changes such as his voice becoming deeper and his hair becoming darker and coarser.

The second section, "Before Testosterone", shows what led Valerio to decide that changing sex was the right path for him. Valerio describes the cultural and ethnic backgrounds of his mother and father. He says that one of his relationships led him to discover that being a lesbian and sex between two women did not arouse him. He discovered that his attraction towards women wasn't a lesbian attraction, but rather a heterosexual attraction, one from a man to a woman.

The third section, "After Testosterone", focuses on Valerio's emotional, social, and perceptual transformation from female to male. The beginning chapters of this section narrates Valerio's acceptance of becoming a male. His body is physically transitioning and he is adapting to ‘male’ experiences such as shaving, using a deeper voice, and straight women making advances toward him, as well as the difficulty of identity politics when coming out as transsexual to a female coworker. Valerio narrates his perceptual experiences of not yet having bottom surgery but being physically male otherwise. The book ends with his discovery of his Adam's apple that has grown from the testosterone, and his excitement and recognition that this transition was exactly what he needed to be happy with himself.

==== Reception ====
The Testosterone Files was a finalist for the 2007 Lambda Literary Award for Transgender Literature. Publishers Weekly gave it a mixed review, labeling it a tough book. Jacob Anderson-Minshall, in a review for Windy City Times, praised the book's account of Valerio's transition and its controversial argument that sex differences are primarily caused by hormones rather than socialization.

=== Film and video ===
Valerio was first profiled by documentarian Monika Treut for the 1992 film Female Misbehavior, in which short film MAX shows him talking about the first steps of transitioning, including his experience of perceptual, emotional and physical change with testosterone. He is one of seven transgender individuals featured in her 1999 documentary Gendernauts: A Journey Through Shifting Identities. Twenty years later, Treut revisited several of the subjects of Gendernauts, including Valerio, in follow-up documentary film Genderation (2021).

== Works ==
=== Poems ===
- Exile: Vision Quest at the Edge of Identity (2009)
- Troubling the Line: Trans and Genderqueer Poetry and Poetics (poetry anthology, 2013)
- The Criminal: The Invisibility of Parallel Forces (2019)

=== Chapbooks ===
- Animal Magnetism (1984 [pre-transition])

=== Anthologies ===
- This Bridge Called My Back (1981 [pre-transition])
- Male Lust (2000)
- The Phallus Palace (2002)
- This Bridge We Call Home (2002)
- Manning Up: Transsexual Men on Finding Brotherhood, Family and Themselves (2014)

=== Books ===
- The Testosterone Files: My social and hormonal transition from female to male (memoir, 2006)

== Filmography ==
=== Documentaries ===
- Female Misbehavior (1992)
  - Includes short film MAX (1991) featuring Valerio
- You Don't Know Dick: Courageous Hearts of Transsexual Men (1996)
- Gendernauts: A Journey Through Shifting Identities (1999)
- Octopus Alarm (2005)
- Straight White Male (2011)
- Genderation (2021)
- Framing Agnes (2022)

=== Short films ===
- Unhung Heroes (2002)
- Maggots and Men (2009)
- Augmented (2025)
