= Sierra Pacific Synod =

Synod of the Evangelical Lutheran Church in America

Location
- Country: United States
- Territory: northern and central California, northern Nevada
- Headquarters: Oakland, California

Statistics
- Congregations: 182
- Members: 43,068 (baptized, 2014)

Information
- Denomination: Evangelical Lutheran Church in America
- Established: 1988; 38 years ago

Current leadership
- Bishop: Jeff R. Johnson

Map

Website
- www.spselca.org

The Sierra Pacific Synod is one of the 65 synods of the Evangelical Lutheran Church in America (ELCA). It covers central and northern California and northern Nevada and supports ELCA congregations throughout that region. It was headed by Bishop Megan Rohrer who resigned on June 6, 2022. As of 2023, it is led by Bishop Jeff R. Johnson.

It is subdivided into nine conferences, each headed by a dean.

1. Redwood Mountain covering the northernmost part of the synod
2. Bridges covering the north and northeastern parts of the San Francisco Bay area
3. Capitol Valley covers congregations around the California state capital, Sacramento
4. Sierra Nevada Foothill covers congregations in the Sierra Nevada mountains and also Nevada.
5. San Francisco Peninsula covers congregations from San Francisco to Mountain View
6. El Camino Real covers congregations from Sunnyvale south along the coast.
7. Mt. Diablo covers the south and interior parts of the east side of the San Francisco Bay area.
8. Sierra Central Valley covers the California Central Valley south of Sacramento but north of Fresno.
9. Central San Joaquin Valley covers the Fresno area

The synod, like many ELCA synods, is a companion of a non-US Lutheran church. Sierra Pacific's companions are the Taiwan Lutheran Church, the Lutheran Church of Rwanda, and the Salvadoran Lutheran Church.

Bishops current and former:

- Robert W. Mattheis (1994–2002), resigned due to illness
- David G. Mullen (2002–2008)
- Mark W. Holmerud (2008–2021)
- Megan Rohrer (2021–2022)
- Interim Bishop Claire S. Burkat (2022-2023)
- Jeff R. Johnson (2023-)

Well known churches in the synod include St. Francis Lutheran Church and First United Lutheran Church. Both were suspended from the denomination in 1990 and then expelled in 1995 for ordaining gay and lesbian pastors. After the ELCA changed its rules on ordaining gay and lesbian pastors in 2009, they rejoined in 2011 and 2012 respectively.

University Lutheran Chapel in Berkeley was also reprimanded for calling a gay pastor, Jeff R. Johnson, in 1999. On September 17, 2023, Jeff R. Johnson was elected as the first openly gay bishop of the Sierra Pacific Synod.

Sierra Pacific Synod supported 2024 California Proposition 3 - which amended the California Constitution to recognize a fundamental right to marry, regardless of sex or race and removed language in California Constitution stating that marriage is only between a man and a woman. It passed.
