= FTM International =

Organization for trans men in the U.S.

FTM International is the oldest organization for trans men in the United States. Founded by Lou Sullivan in 1986, it is dedicated to the provision of resources for FTM individuals along with creating a visible community.

== History ==
The organization that would come to be known as FTM International was founded by Lou Sullivan in San Francisco during December 1986. Unlike many similar organizations for MTF individuals, Sullivan's initial San Francisco chapter attracted sexually diverse individuals and avoided division based on sexual orientation.

Starting in September 1987, FTM International began to publish the monthly "FTM Newsletter," providing resources for their members. Early meetings included several well-known trans men, including activist Jamison Green, photographer Loren Cameron, and Stephan Thorne, one of the highest ranking out transgender law enforcement officers in the United States. Sullivan handed over control of the organization to Green prior to his 1991 death, who incorporated the group as a nonprofit and added "International" to its name to reflect the newsletter's international reach. By 1999, the organization grew to have at least 1,500 members across 17 countries.

From August 18–20, 1995, FTM International hosted the first international all-FTM gender conference to be held in North America. The goal of this conference was to build community of FTM individuals and to shift the general public's perceptions of what it is to be transgender as, at the time, the general public's view of transgender individuals was typically that of MTF individuals. This conference hosted over 360 FTM individuals from the U.S., Canada, Australia, Germany, and Japan.

== Services ==
FTM International also holds in-person meetings at their chapters based around the world, including chapters in the United States, China, France, India, Mexico, and South Africa. Along with providing general education about and for FTM individuals, FTM International offers gender resources for FTM individuals (for example, information about clinics that provide support for gender dysphoria). FTM International's website features profiles of FTM doctors who specialize in gender-related medicine.

FTM International also provides legal resources for its members, financially sponsoring the Transgender Law Center. In partnering with FTM International, the Transgender Law Center sponsors the annual California Transgender Leadership Summit to provide FTM individuals with information on their legal rights.

== Initiatives and goals ==
The main goal of FTM International is to provide support for FTM individuals and their families and build a united FTM community. Their other main goals and activities include sponsoring local and regional chapters and communities, providing educational activities, and promoting of visibility of FTM individuals.

== Publications ==
- The FTM International Newsletter
- The FTMI Yellow Pages Resource Directory
- The FTM International CD: The Story of a Trans Man
