= Robert H. Smith (theologian) =

Robert Harry Smith
- Born: Robert Harry Smith; October 30, 1932; Holyoke, Massachusetts, USA
- Died: March 16, 2006 (aged 73); El Cerrito, California, USA
- Education: A.A. Concordia Junior College, Bronxville, New York; B.A., M.Div., S.T.M., Th.D. Concordia Seminary, St. Louis, Missouri
- Occupation: Theologian
- Spouse(s): Emita M. Rivas (m. 1955–her death), Rev. Donna Duensing (m. 1993–2006) (his death)
- Children: Roberta, Judith, Maria

Robert Harry Smith (October 30, 1932 - March 16, 2006) was a Lutheran clergyman, theologian, prolific author and lecturer on the Bible's New Testament, and dean of a Lutheran seminary in exile in the early 1980s. Smith was one of 40 faculty members from the Lutheran Church–Missouri Synod's Concordia Seminary in St. Louis, Missouri who walked out in 1974 in a theological dispute that ended with the ousting of Concordia's president, John Tietjen, who disagreed with a literal reading of the Bible.

== Early life and education ==
Robert Harry Smith was born on October 30, 1932, in Holyoke, Massachusetts to Harry and Gertrude Smith, the eldest of six children. He grew up in Massachusetts, graduating from Holyoke High School in 1950.

After earning an Associate of Arts degree from Concordia Junior College in Bronxville, New York, and his Bachelor of Arts, Master of Divinity, Master of Sacred Theology, and Doctor of Theology degrees from Concordia Seminary, Smith served as pastor of the Lutheran Church of Our Redeemer in Chappaqua, New York from 1959 to 1968. He then taught at Concordia Seminary from 1968 to 1974.

== Seminex dispute ==
After the theological dispute in 1974, which led to the dismissal of Smith and roughly 40 dissident professors, he helped form the seminary formally called Christ Seminary-Seminex. The dismissed faculty members, along with the vast majority of Concordia's 750 students, continued their studies "in exile" for nine years in St. Louis. They studied in classrooms supplied by Jesuit St. Louis University, and Eden Seminary. Christ Seminary-Seminex later merged with the Lutheran School of Theology at Chicago. Smith served as dean for the "seminary in exile" from 1981 until 1983.

== Later ministry ==
In 1983, Smith joined Pacific Lutheran Theological Seminary (PLTS) in Berkeley, California, one of nine Protestant and Roman Catholic seminaries that make up the Graduate Theological Union, along with the University of California, Berkeley and 10 other religious centers. He taught classes on the New Testament and Greek, and wrote a textbook, Read Greek by Friday, published in 2004. Throughout his career, Smith wrote numerous articles and books, mostly on the New Testament, and for more than a decade, he edited "Preaching Helps" in the magazine Currents in Theology and Mission.

"He had an absolute joy of life," Duensing told the San Francisco Chronicle. "He lived life to the fullest, each and every day, with a twinkle in his eye."

Known for his engaging style, the biblical scholar was popular among students, particularly for the Greek dinners he often held at his home.

"Smith did not merely teach scripture, he captured its spirit and showed its relevance to present day concerns," according to a statement made by PLTS. "He was a riveting teacher; students left class wanting more; they wished semesters would never end. He taught scripture as proclamation; he wrote as a preacher for preachers."

On his webpage, Smith wrote: "As a teacher of the Bible, I would be a failure if I kept my nose and students’ noses only in the Bible."

"Christ lives," he continued, "and God continues to act and speak in the world today."

== Personal life ==
Smith married the late Emita M. Rivas in 1955, and they had three children, Roberta, Judith, and Maria. He later married the Rev. Donna Duensing in 1993; they traveled widely in Greece, Turkey, and Italy, led tours to the Holy Land, and occasionally even taught together in the Graduate Theological Union, where Duensing served as director of contextual education at PLTS from 1989 to 1998, and later at San Francisco Theological Seminary in San Anselmo, California from 2000 to 2005. When Duensing pastored First United Lutheran Church in San Francisco, California in 1999–2000, he served as pastor's spouse to the congregation, creating wooden figures for the children's sermons. During his time in Berkeley, he served on the board of the Berkeley Emergency Food Project and Shelter and volunteered at Habitat for Humanity.

Smith was 73 when he died of leukemia at his home in El Cerrito, California on March 16, 2006. In the moments before his death, his wife, Donna, exclaimed: "Bob, I love you so much, and God loves you even more." A smile flickered across his face, and then he died.

== Books authored ==
Smith authored or co-authored the following books:

- Classic Commentary on Acts (1970)
- Easter Gospels: The Resurrection of Jesus according to the Four Evangelists (1983)
- Augsburg Commentary on the New Testament—Hebrews (1984)
- Augsburg Commentary on the New Testament—Matthew (1989)
- Apocalypse: A Commentary on Revelation in Words and Images (2000)
- Read Greek by Friday: A Beginning Grammar and Exercise with Paul Fullmer (2004)
- Read Greek by Friday: The Gospel of John and 1 John with Paul Fullmer (2005)
- Greek at a Glance with Paul Fullmer (2007)
- Wounded Lord: Reading John Through the Eyes of Thomas (2009)
