= Jamison Green =

American transgender rights activist (born 1948)

Jamison (James) Green
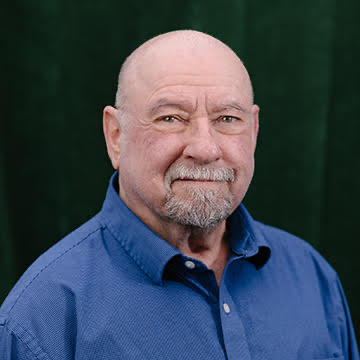
- Green in 2024
- Born: Jamison Green; November 8, 1948 (age 77); Oakland, California, U.S.
- Education: Manchester Metropolitan University
- Years active: 1968–present
- Known for: Prominent campaigner in the transgender rights movement
- Board member of: Gender Education and Advocacy, Transgender Law and Policy Institute, World Professional Association for Transgender Health, Equality Project
- Spouse: Heidi Bruins (m. 2003)
- Website: http://www.jamisongreen.com

Jamison "James" Green (born November 8, 1948) is a prominent American transgender rights activist, author, and educator focused on policy work.

Green began living openly as a trans man in the late 1980s and is considered one of the few publicly open transgender men of that time. He started to advocate for the legal protection of transgender workers in 1989 and since then has served on multiple boards, including the Transgender Law and Policy Institute. In 2004, Green authored the book Becoming a Visible Man, which won the Sylvia Rivera award.

== Activism ==
Green is known as an activist for the legal protection, medical access, safety, civil rights, and dignity of transgender and transsexual people. "Green has been at the forefront of writing transgender health policy," writes NewNowNext, "His writing has been used to lay the groundwork for transgender anti-discrimination practices and insurance coverage across the nation."

He began presenting on the fair treatment of transgender workers in 1989. Green continued his advocacy work and in the 1990s became "known both in the U.S. and abroad for his transgender activism." Green took over writing the FTM Newsletter after Lou Sullivan's death in 1991. The newsletter addressed the "complex legal, medical, and general social needs" of trans men. He was the leader of FTM International from March 1991 to August 1999.

Green grew a San Francisco support group for transgender men into a global organization and in 1994 wrote a report on the discrimination against transgender people for the San Francisco Human Rights Commission.

He has published several essays and articles, wrote a column for PlanetOut.com and has appeared in eight documentary films.

Green has served on the boards of the Transgender Law and Policy Institute and the Equality Project, was an advisory board member of the National Center for Transgender Equality, and chaired the board of Gender Education and Advocacy. He served as president of the World Professional Association for Transgender Health from 2014 to 2016.

Green helped establish the Human Rights Campaign's Corporate Equality Index in 2002 and was a member of the organization's Business Council until late 2007, when he resigned over the organization's stance on transgender inclusion in the Employment Non-Discrimination Act.

In 2007, Green founded a consulting group which works with businesses, educators, and the government on transgender training and policy work called Transgender Strategies Consulting.

Building on his experience as an activist, Green earned his Ph.D. in Equalities Law from Manchester Metropolitan University in England in 2011.

== Becoming a Visible Man ==
Green authored Becoming a Visible Man in 2004. The book combines two strands: autobiographical writing about Green's transition from living as a lesbian to living as a bisexual trans man, as well as broader commentary about the status of transsexual men in society. Writing in The New York Times, Jennifer Finney Boylan described it as "the first great memoir by a trans man".

The book received the 2004 Sylvia Rivera Award for best book in Transgender Studies from the Center for Lesbian and Gay Studies and was also a finalist for a 2004 Lambda Literary Award.

In 2020, Green published a new edition of the book under Vanderbilt University Press. In 2019, NewNowNext described the book as, "still canonical in transgender literature. Part autobiography, part gender theory, the book not only embraces transgender people in their first steps of living openly if they so desire; it challenges cisgender readers to interrogate their own identities."

== A History of Transgender Medicine in the United States ==
In 2025, Green co-edited the book A History of Transgender Medicine in the United States: From Margins to Mainstream with Carolyn Wolf-Gould, Dallas Denny, and Kyan Lynch. The work includes writings by more than 40 authors. The book received a bronze award in the health category at the 2025 Foreword Indies Book of the Year Awards.

== Awards ==
In 2009, Green was the first transgender person to receive the Distinguished Service Award from the Association of Gay and Lesbian Psychiatrists.

== Personal life ==
Green began his medical transition in the late 1980s with the intention of living openly about his transgender status. He is considered one of few publicly open transgender men of that time.

Today, Green lives in the Pacific Northwest with his wife, Heidi. He is bisexual.

== Bibliography ==
- (2004) Becoming a Visible Man (Vanderbilt University Press) (ISBN 082651457X)
- Wolf-Gould, Carolyn; Denny, Dallas; Green, Jamison; Lynch, Kyan (February 2025). A History of Transgender Medicine in the United States: From Margins to Mainstream. State University of New York Press. ISBN 9798855801217.
