= We Both Laughed in Pleasure =

2019 nonfiction book by Lou Sullivan

We Both Laughed in Pleasure: The Selected Diaries of Lou Sullivan, 1961–1991
- First edition
- Editor: Ellis Martin and Zach Ozma
- Author: Lou Sullivan
- Language: English
- Subject: Transgender rights in the United States; HIV
- Genre: Diary
- Publisher: Nightboat Books
- Publication date: 17 September 2019
- Publication place: United States

We Both Laughed in Pleasure: The Selected Diaries of Lou Sullivan, 1961–1991 is a book of writing from the diaries of transgender rights activist Lou Sullivan, edited by Ellis Martin and Zach Ozma. It includes a foreword by trans studies professor Susan Stryker.

The book discusses Sullivan's childhood, his transition, his push for heterosexuality to be removed as a criterion for medical transition and final days living with HIV.

== Reception ==
We Both Laughed in Pleasure was generally well received. Slate's Crispin Long said the book was "ripe with mirth, confusion, lust, despair, hope, and charm." The Nation's Sasha Geffen said it "dispenses with the ubiquitous narrative of transition as a dreary but necessary inconvenience." Jeremy Lybarger, writing for The New Yorker, called it "a radical testament to trans happiness," saying it was "chatty and tender, casually poetic and voraciously sexual." Chicago Review's Gabriel Ojeda-Sagué expanded on others' reviews, writing that We Both Laughed in Pleasure is "a deeply erotic book. Sullivan's diaries record in great detail his sexual exploits, romantic infatuations, and complex personal relationships. These reminiscences are written in a style somewhere between childlike giddiness and deft description, where you can sense that Sullivan is turning himself on with every entry he writes."

We Both Laughed in Pleasure won the Lambda Literary Award for Transgender Nonfiction in 2020.
