= St. Francis Lutheran Church =

St. Francis Lutheran
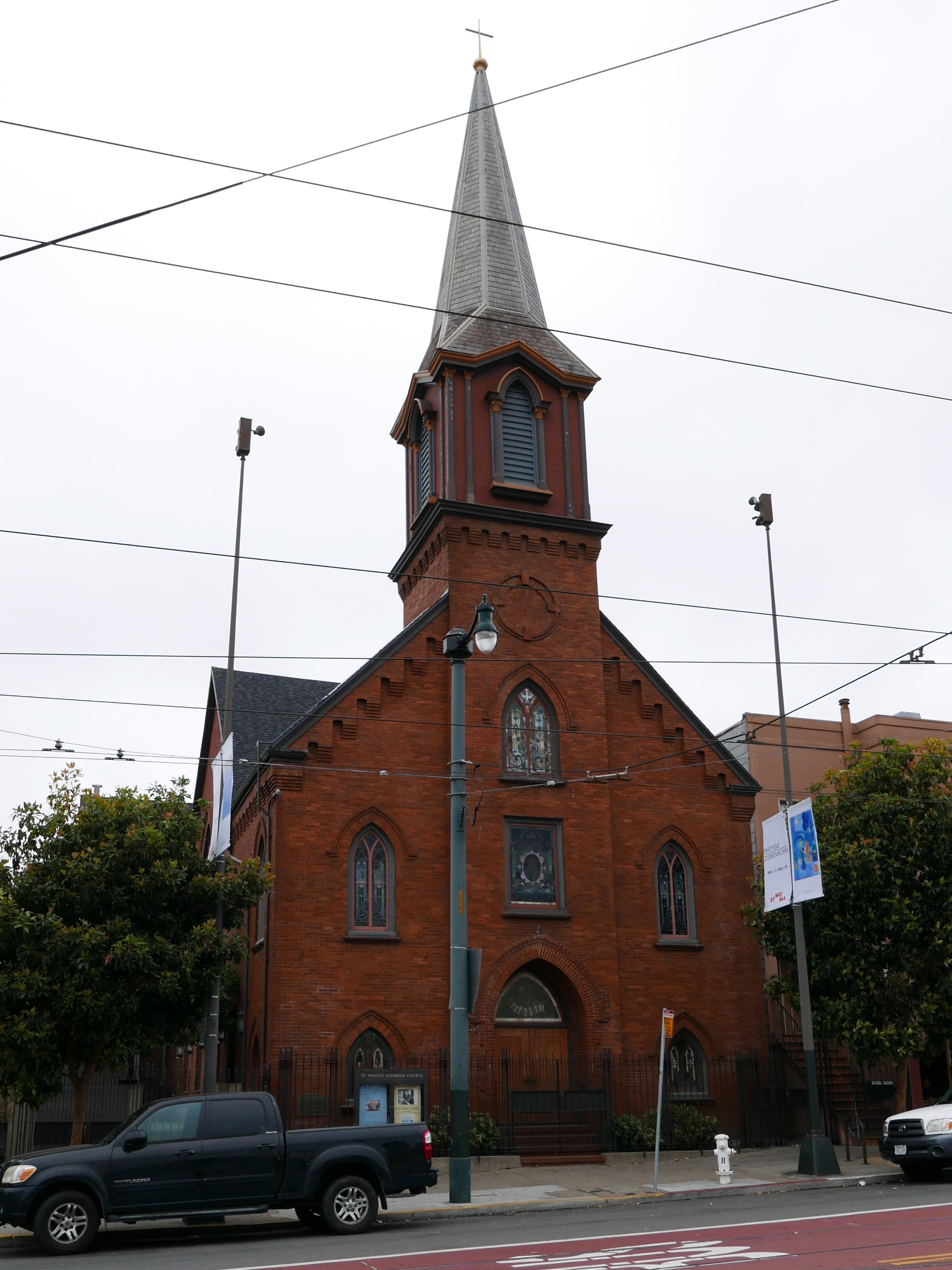

- Location within San Francisco County Location within California Location within the United States
- 37.76861°N 122.42934°W
- Location: 152 Church Street, San Francisco, California, United States

History
- Built: 1905

San Francisco Designated Landmark
- Designated: July 10, 1971
- Reference no.: 39

Saint Francis Lutheran Church was built in 1905 and is located at 152 Church Street, between Market Street and Duboce Street in San Francisco, California. The church building has stained glass windows and Memorial Terrace outside.

== History ==
In 1899, First Finnish Lutheran Church was founded on 50 Belcher Street, in what then was considered part of the Eureka Valley district of San Francisco, but what is located on the outskirts of what today is best known as the Castro District. Next to it, on September 17, 1905, the cornerstone was laid for the Danish St. Ansgar Church at 152 Church Street, between Market Street and Duboce Avenue. During the April 18, 1906, San Francisco earthquake and its aftermath, the parsonage served as a feeding station and hospital. In 1964, St. Ansgar merged with First Finnish Lutheran Church. The name for the united church, St. Francis Lutheran Church, was derived from San Francisco.

Before the 1906 San Francisco earthquake, nearly all the kids attending the McKinley school (now McKinley Elementary School) at 1025 14th Street (at Castro Street) were Finnish. Following the earthquake, a large number of Finns from San Francisco and elsewhere moved to Berkeley, where a Finnish community had been established already before the earthquake. A large part of the early Berkeley population was Finnish.

St. Francis Lutheran Church was built by immigrants from the Nordic countries, where Lutheranism is the largest religious group. The church was built in the heart of what was then the Nordic-dominated Duboce-Market neighborhood of San Francisco. The brick and wood frame of the St. Francis Lutheran Church building survived the 1906 San Francisco earthquake and then was used for several months as an infirmary. Following the 1906 earthquake, the same year, Finns founded the Lutheran Church of the Cross in Berkeley, at University Avenue, where the Lutheran congregation still operates today.

66 years before the erection of St. Francis Lutheran Church, the very first Protestant church on the Pacific Coast was erected by Finns and Swedes and other Lutherans who worked for the Russian-American Company, which was established in 1802. That first Lutheran church was the Sitka Lutheran Church in Alaska, built in 1840.

== See also ==
- List of San Francisco Designated Landmarks
