= List of The Real World seasons =

Comprehensive list of seasons of The Real World

The following charts list the seasons and cast members of the reality television show, The Real World, its reunion shows, and its DVD and VHS releases.

== The Real World seasons ==
Season, location, year		Cast members							
1	New York (1992)	Rebecca Blasband	Andre Comeau	Heather B. Gardner	Julie Gentry	Norman Korpi	Eric Nies	Kevin Powell	
2	Los Angeles (1993)	Tami Roman (then Akbar)	Aaron Behle	Irene Berrera (Kearns) (Note: The cast member voluntarily left the show before filming ended.)	Jon Brennan	David Edwards (Note: The cast member was required to leave the show before filming ended.)	Dominic Griffin	Beth Stolarczyk	
2	Los Angeles (1993)	Tami Roman (then Akbar)	Aaron Behle	Beth Anthony	Jon Brennan	Glen Naessens	Dominic Griffin	Beth Stolarczyk	
3	San Francisco (1994)	Mohammed Bilal	Rachel Campos	Pam Ling	Cory Murphy	Puck Rainey (Note: The cast member was required to leave the residence before the show ended, but was allowed to remain as part of the cast.)	Judd Winick	Pedro Zamora	
3	San Francisco (1994)	Mohammed Bilal	Rachel Campos	Pam Ling	Cory Murphy	Jo Rhodes	Judd Winick	Pedro Zamora	
4	London (1995)	Jacinda Barrett	Neil Forrester	Jay Frank	Sharon Gitau	Mike Johnson	Kat Ogden	Lars Schlichting	
5	Miami (1996)	Flora Alekseyeun	Sarah Becker	Mike Lambert	Melissa Padrón (Note: The cast member voluntarily left the residence but remained part of the cast.)	Joe Patane	Dan Renzi	Cynthia Roberts	
6	Boston (1997)	Jason Cornwell	Sean Duffy	Montana McGlynn	Genesis Moss	Kameelah Phillips	Elka Walker	Syrus Yarbrough	
7	Seattle (1998)	Nathan Blackburn	Lindsay Brien	David Burns	Janet Choi	Rebecca Lord	Irene McGee	Stephen Williams	
8	Hawaii (1999)	Ruthie Alcaide	Margaret "Kaia" Beck	Amaya Brecher	Justin Deabler	Tecumseh "Teck" Holmes III	Colin Mortensen	Matt Simon	
9	New Orleans (2000)	David Broom	Melissa Howard	Kelley Limp	Jamie Murray	Danny Roberts	Matt Smith	Julie Stoffer	
10	Back to New York (2001)	Rachel Braband	Malik Cooper	Kevin Dunn	Nicole Mitsch	Mike Mizanin	Coral Smith	Lori Trespicio	
11	Chicago (2002)	Chris Beckman	Kyle Brandt	Tonya Cooley	Aneesa Ferreira	Keri Evans	Theo Gantt III	Cara Kahn	
12	Las Vegas (2002–03)	Trishelle Cannatella	Arissa Hill	Steven Hill	Frank Roessler	Brynn Smith	Irulan Wilson	Alton Williams	
13	Paris (2003)	Ace Amerson	Leah Gillingwater	Adam King	Simon Sherry-Wood	Mallory Snyder	Chris "CT" Tamburello	Christina Trainor	
14	San Diego (2004)	Frankie Abernathy	Randy Barry	Jamie Chung	Cameran Eubanks	Brad Fiorenza	Robin Hibbard	Jacquese Smith	
14	San Diego (2004)	Charlie Dordevich	Randy Barry	Jamie Chung	Cameran Eubanks	Brad Fiorenza	Robin Hibbard	Jacquese Smith	
15	Philadelphia (2004–05)	Shavonda Billingslea	Karamo Brown	Sarah Burke	M.J. Garrett	William Hernandez	Landon Lueck	Melanie Silcott	
16	Austin (2005)	Wes Bergmann	Johanna Botta	Lacey Buehler	Nehemiah Clark	Danny Jamieson	Rachel Moyal	Melinda Stolp	
17	Key West (2006)	Melissa Truman	John Devenanzio	Tyler Duckworth	Zach Mann	Paula Meronek	Svetlana Shusterman	Jose Tapia	
18	Denver (2006–07)	Tyrie Ballard	Colie Edison	Jenn Grijalva	Brooke LaBarbera	Davis Mallory	Stephen Nichols	Alex Smith	
19	Sydney (2007–08)	Trisha Cummings	Dunbar Flinn	Cohutta Lee Grindstaff	KellyAnne Judd	Parisa Montazaran	Isaac Stout	Shauvon Torres	
19	Sydney (2007–08)	Trisha Cummings	Dunbar Flinn	Cohutta Lee Grindstaff	KellyAnne Judd	Parisa Montazaran	Isaac Stout	Ashli Robson	
20	Hollywood (2008)	Kimberly Alexander	Will Gilbert	Greg Halstead	Joey Kovar	Dave Malinosky	Sarah Ralston	Brianna Taylor	
20	Hollywood (2008)	Kimberly Alexander	Will Gilbert	Nick Brown	Brittini Sherrod	Dave Malinosky	Sarah Ralston	Brianna Taylor	
21 (Note: The Real World: Brooklyn is the first season to feature eight, instead of the usual seven roommates.)	Brooklyn (2009)	Chet Cannon	Ryan Conklin	Katelynn Cusanelli	Scott Herman	J.D. Ordonez	Sarah Rice	Devyn Simone	Baya Voce
22	Cancun (2009)	Bronne Bruzgo	Derek Chavez	Ayiiia Elizarraras	Emilee Fitzpatrick	CJ Koegel	Jonna Mannion	Jasmine Reynaud	Joey Rozmus
23	D.C. (2009–10)	Josh Colon	Ashley Lindley	Mike Manning	Ty Ruff	Emily Schromm	Callie Walker	Erika Wasilewski	Andrew Woods
24	New Orleans (2010)	Jemmye Carroll	Preston Charles	McKenzie Coburn	Sahar Dika	Ashlee Feldman	Ryan Knight	Ryan Leslie	Eric Patrick
25	Las Vegas (2011)	Naomi Defensor	Leroy Garrett	Nany González	Heather Marter	Michael Ross	Adam Royer	Dustin Zito	
25	Las Vegas (2011)	Naomi Defensor	Leroy Garrett	Nany González	Heather Marter	Michael Ross	Heather Cooke	Dustin Zito	
26	San Diego (2011)	Alexandra Govere	Ashley Kelsey	Sam McGinn	Priscilla Mendez	Zach Nichols	Nate Stodghill	Frank Sweeney	
27	St. Thomas (2012)	La Toya Jackson	Brandon Kane	Marie Roda	Robb Schreiber	Brandon Swift	Laura Waller	Trey Weatherholtz III	
28	Portland (2013)	Jessica McCain	Anastasia Miller	Joi Niemeyer	Johnny Reilly	Averey Tressler	Marlon Williams	Jordan Wiseley	Daisy (Note: Daisy is Averey Tressler's pet dog. She was included by Bunim-Murray as an official member of the cast.)
28	Portland (2013)	Jessica McCain	Anastasia Miller	Nia Moore	Johnny Reilly	Averey Tressler	Marlon Williams	Jordan Wiseley	Daisy
29 (Note: Real World: Ex-Plosion had 12 cast members. Exes are listed with their corresponding original cast member and were additional roommates, not replacements.)	Ex-Plosion (2014)	Thomas Buell	Jenny Delich	Jay Mitchell	Jamie Larson	Ashley Mitchell	Arielle Scott	Cory Wharton	
29	Ex-Plosion (2014)	Hailey Chivers	Brian Williams, Jr.	Jenna Compono	Jamie Larson	Ashley Mitchell	Ashley Ceaser	Lauren Ondersma	
30	Skeletons (2014–15)	Bruno Bettencourt	Sylvia Elsrode	Jason Hill	Violetta Milerman	Tony Raines	Madison Walls	Nicole Zanatta	
31	Go Big or Go Home (2016)	Chris Ammon Hall	Kailah Casillas	CeeJai Jenkins	Sabrina Kennedy	Dione Mariani	Dean Bart-Plange	Jenna Thomason	Dylan Moore (Note: Dylan was brought in mid-season as a surprise cast member who was able to become a roommate upon completion of the Survive mission.)
32 (Note: Real World Seattle: Bad Blood had 14 cast members. Bad Blood are listed with their corresponding original cast member and were additional roommates, not replacements.)	Seattle: Bad Blood (2016–17)	Jordan Anderson	Mike Crescenzo	Tyara Hooks	Theo King-Bradley	Robbie Padovano	Anika Rashaun	Katrina Stack	
32	Seattle: Bad Blood (2016–17)	Orlana Russell	Peter Romeo	Kimberly Johansson	Kassius Lake	Jennifer Geoghan	Will Groomes III	Anna Stack	
33	Atlanta (2019)	Yasmin Almokhamad	Arely Avitua	Justin Blu	Tovah Marx	Meagan Melancon	Dondre Randolph	Clint Wright	

== The Real World reunions ==
Reunion Title	Year	Casts Involved	No-Shows	Notes
The Real World Reunion: Inside Out	1995	New York, Los Angeles, San Francisco and London	Andre, Dominic, Aaron, Pedro, Jay	Filmed on September 16, 1995 at Universal Studios Hollywood and hosted by Alison Stewart, this reunion special aired February 17, 1996. Puck storms off stage during San Francisco's set after heated words were exchanged off-camera with Judd and Mohammed involving comments made about Pedro, who had died shortly after his season finished airing.
Real World Seattle Blooper Show	1998	Seattle	Irene	After the season, MTV reunited the Seattle cast at the MTV studios for a two-episode reunion/blooper-reel show hosted by MTV VJ Ananda Lewis.
The Real World Reunion 2000	2000	Miami, Boston, Seattle, Hawaii	Montana, Irene, Colin and Matt	This reunion was marked by several participants who seemed disillusioned by their experience. San Francisco's Rachel Campos also makes an appearance, now as the wife of Boston's Sean Duffy. Hosted by Dave Holmes.
The Real World New Orleans Unmasked	2000	New Orleans		Hosted by Real World Alum, Rachel (San Francisco) and Nathan (Seattle)
The Real World 10th Anniversary Special	2001	New York, Los Angeles, San Francisco, London, Miami, Boston, Seattle, Hawaii, New Orleans	Julie G, Aaron, Dominic, Tami, Pedro, Jacinda, Jay, Melissa P, Genesis, Montana, Irene McG, Janet, Colin, and Matt Simon	The entire cast gathered for a photo shoot commemorating the 10th year of the series.
Stop Being Polite	2002	Chicago		
7 The Hard Way	2003	Las Vegas	Trishelle	
French Kissing and Telling	2003	Paris	Simon isn't at the reunion physically, but is there via telephone.	
2 Punk Rock 4 This	2004	San Diego		
Fistful of Philly	2005	Philadelphia		
Tex, Hugs, & Rock 'n' Roll	2005	Austin		Nehemiah, Rachel, and Lacey get into fights with Danny.
Fun, Sun, and Now Totally Done	2006	Key West		The cast singles out Tyler for his antics.
Welcome to the Mile High Club	2007	Denver		Stephen fights with Davis about his sexuality and Brooke talks about her anger.
Reunited: The Real World Las Vegas	2007	Las Vegas		The cast is reunited to live in the same suite for two weeks.
Escape From Oz	2008	Sydney		See main article.
Real World Awards Bash	2008	New York Through Hollywood	New York: Becky, Andre, Heather, Julie, Norman, Kevin Los Angeles: Aaron, David, Dominic, Tami San Francisco: Cory, Mohammed, Pedro, Jo London: The entire cast was not present Miami: Sarah, Dan, Joe, Cynthia, Flora, Mike Boston: Elka, Genesis Seattle: Janet, Rebecca, Lindsay, Irene Hawaii: Colin, Amaya, Matt New Orleans: Jamie, Melissa, Danny, Kelley, Julie, David Back to New York: Kevin, Nicole, Rachel Chicago: Keri, Chris, Theo Las Vegas: Steven, Irulan Paris: Christina, Leah San Diego: Brad, Cameran, Charlie, Frankie, Jamie Philadelphia: Shavonda Austin: Wes Key West: none Denver: none Sydney: Dunbar Hollywood: none	Cast members receive awards for memorable moments throughout all 19 seasons. A special tribute is given to late Real Worlders Pedro and Frankie. The cast of The Real World Hollywood makes a guest appearance. The Real World Austin is crowned Best Season.
The Real World: Hollywood Reunion	2008	Hollywood	Greg	See main article.
The Real World: Brooklyn Reunion	2009	Brooklyn		Ryan surprised the roommates and the audience by appearing in the reunion before going back to Iraq.
The Real World: Cancun Reunion	2009	Cancun		Joey left more than halfway through the reunion due to a prior commitment with his band.
The Real World: D.C. Reunion	2010	D.C.		
The Real World: New Orleans Reunion	2010	New Orleans		Ryan stated that he would not have come to the reunion had he not been contractually obligated.
The Real World: Las Vegas Reunion	2011	Las Vegas		
The Real World: San Diego Reunion	2011	San Diego		First The Real World reunion to air in high-definition. Frank and Sam take exception to Zach's homophobic attitude.
The Real World: St. Thomas Reunion	2012	St. Thomas		
The Real World: Portland Reunion	2013	Portland		
Real World: Ex-Plosion Reunion	2014	Ex-Plosion		

In April 2008 at the MTV's Real World Awards Bash, viewers voted on their favorite The Real World season on MTV.com. Voting is presumably skewed by more recent seasons being more relevant to the voters at the time.

#	Season
1	Austin
2	Las Vegas
3	San Diego
4	Sydney
5	Hawaii
6	Denver
7	New Orleans
8	San Francisco
9	Key West
10	Seattle

== The Real World DVD and VHS releases, retail ==
Title	Release yyyy/mm/dd	Cover	Format
The Real World: A Decade of Bloopers	2002/05/28		DVD
The Real World: Exotic Vacations	2002/09/24		DVD
The Real World: Greatest Fights	2000/10/17		DVD
The Real World: Hookups	2003/11/11		DVD
The Real World Movie: The Lost Season	2003/01/28		DVD
The Real World You Never Saw: Back to New York	2001/12/04		DVD
The Real World You Never Saw: Boston + Seattle	1998/xx/xx		VHS
The Real World You Never Saw: Chicago	2002/05/28		DVD
The Real World You Never Saw: Hawaii	1999/11/02		DVD
The Real World You Never Saw: Las Vegas	2003/01/28		DVD
The Real World You Never Saw: New Orleans	2000/10/17		DVD
The Real World You Never Saw: Paris	2003/11/11		DVD
The Real World: New York Season 01	2002/09/24		DVD
The Real World: Las Vegas Season 12	2003/05/20		DVD
The Real World: Las Vegas Season 25	2011/07/29 (Amazon.com MOD)		DVD
Real World: Ex-Plosion Season 29	2014/10/30 (Amazon.com MOD)		DVD
The Real World You Never Saw [Seasons 01-06]	1997/xx/xx		VHS
