= The Real World =

American reality TV series (1992–2019)

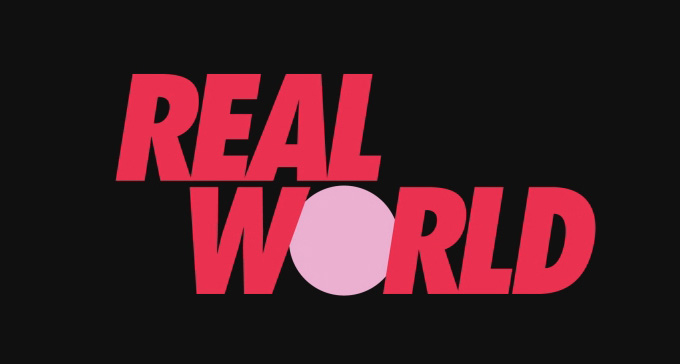
- Logo variant used for seasons 29–31, partial for 33
- Genre: Reality television; Documentary
- Created by: Mary-Ellis Bunim; Jonathan Murray
- Starring: The Real World cast members
- Opening theme: "Up Like" performed by SILAS (seasons 29–32)
- Country of origin: United States
- Original language: English
- No. of seasons: 33
- No. of episodes: 614

Production
- Executive producers: Gil Goldschein; Kelly Rose; Jacquelyn French; Jim Johnston; Jonathan Murray
- Producers: George Verschoor; Matt Kunitz; Rick de Oliveira; Anthony Dominici; Russell Heldt; Ted Kenney; Ken Chien
- Running time: 30 minutes; 60 minutes
- Production company: Bunim/Murray Productions

Original release
- Network: MTV
- Release: May 21, 1992 – January 4, 2017
- Network: Facebook Watch
- Release: June 13 – August 29, 2019

Related
- Road Rules; The Challenge; The Challenge: All Stars

The Real World (known as Real World from 2014 to 2019) is an American reality television series produced through MTV and Bunim/Murray Productions that aired on MTV from 1992 to 2017 and Facebook Watch in 2019. It was originally produced by Mary-Ellis Bunim and Jonathan Murray. First broadcast in 1992, the show was inspired by the 1973 PBS documentary series An American Family. The Real World is one of the longest-running programs in MTV history, one of the longest-running reality series in history, and is credited with launching the modern reality TV genre. Seven to eight young adults are picked to temporarily live in a new city together in one residence while being filmed non-stop.

The series was hailed in its early years for depicting issues of contemporary young-adulthood relevant to its core audience, such as sex, prejudice, religion, abortion, illness, sexuality, AIDS, death, politics, and substance abuse, but later garnered a reputation as a showcase for immaturity and irresponsible behavior. The series has generated two notable related series, both broadcast by MTV: Road Rules, a sister show, which lasted for 14 seasons (1995–2007), and the ongoing spin-off reality game show The Challenge, which has run for 41 seasons since 1998, thus surpassing The Real World.

On June 8, 2018, it was announced that MTV and Bunim/Murray were working on a revival of The Real World, with the hopes of selling the new version to a streaming platform. In 2018, it was announced that the revival had been sold to Facebook Watch for a new American season, plus a Mexican and a Thai version of the show. The thirty-third season was filmed in Atlanta, Georgia and premiered on June 13, 2019, along with the first new international localized versions since 1996: El Mundo Real in Mexico City and The Real World: Bangkok. A reboot of the original show for Paramount+ was mentioned in the press in 2021 but never materialized.

On March 4, 2021, the spin-off The Real World Homecoming: New York premiered on Paramount+. The series reunited the cast of The Real World: New York to live in the same loft they lived in for the original series. Two more reunion seasons followed. All three seasons were removed from the streaming service in 2023.

== History ==
The Real World was inspired by the 1973 PBS documentary series An American Family. It focuses on the lives of a group of strangers who audition to live together in a house for several months, as cameras record their interpersonal relationships. The show moves to a different city each season. The footage shot during the housemates' time together was edited into 22-minute episodes for the first 19 seasons, and into 44-minute episodes beginning with The Real World: Hollywood, the series' twentieth season, before shortening to a 30-minute length for its thirty-third season. The narration given over the opening title sequence used during the first 28 seasons by the seven housemates states some variation of the following:

This is the true story…of seven strangers…picked to live in a house…(work together) and have their lives taped…to find out what happens…when people stop being polite…and start getting real…The Real World.

The Real World was originally inspired by the popularity of youth-oriented shows of the 1990s like Beverly Hills, 90210 and Melrose Place. Bunim and Murray initially considered developing a scripted series in a similar vein, but quickly decided that the cost of paying writers, actors, costume designers, and make-up artists was too high. Bunim and Murray decided against this idea, and at the last minute, pulled the concept (and the cast) before it became the first season of the show. Tracy Grandstaff, one of the original seven picked for what has come to be known as "Season 0", went on to minor fame as the voice of the animated Beavis and Butt-Head character Daria Morgendorffer, who eventually got her own spinoff, Daria. Dutch TV producer Erik Latour claims that the ideas for The Real World were directly derived from his television show Nummer 28, which aired in 1991 on Dutch television. Bunim/Murray decided upon the cheaper idea of casting a bunch of "regular people" to live in an apartment and taping their day-to-day lives, believing seven diverse people would have enough of a basis upon which to interact without scripts. The production converted a massive, 4000-square-foot duplex in Soho, cast seven cast members from 500 applicants, and paid them $2,600 for their time on the show. The cast lived in the loft from February 16 to May 18, 1992. The series premiered three days later, on May 21, 1992.

At the time of its initial airing, reviews of the show were mostly negative. Matt Roush, writing in USA Today, characterized the show as "painfully bogus", and a cynical and exploitative new low in television, commenting, "Watching The Real World, which fails as documentary (too phony) and as entertainment (too dull), it's hard to tell who's using who more." The Washington Post's Tom Shales commented, "Ah to be young, cute, and stupid, and to have too much free time...Such is the lot facing the wayward wastrels of The Real World, something new in excruciating torture from the busy minds at MTV." Shales also remarked upon the cast members' creative career choices, saying, "You might want to think about getting a real job."

Nonetheless, the series was a hit with viewers. One early sign of the show's popularity occurred on the October 2, 1993 episode of the sketch comedy show, Saturday Night Live, which parodied the second-season Los Angeles cast's recurring arguments over cliquism, prejudice and political differences.

The show also gained widespread attention with its third season, The Real World: San Francisco, which aired in 1994, and depicted the conflict between David "Puck" Rainey, a bicycle messenger criticized for his poor personal hygiene, and his roommates, most notably AIDS activist Pedro Zamora. As the show increased in popularity, Zamora's life as someone living with AIDS gained considerable notice, garnering widespread media attention. Zamora was one of the first openly gay men with AIDS to be portrayed in popular media, and after his death on November 11, 1994 (mere hours after the final episode of his season aired), he was lauded by then-President Bill Clinton. Zamora's friend and roommate during the show, Judd Winick, went on to become a successful comic book writer, and wrote the Eisner Award-nominated graphic novel Pedro and Me, about his friendship with Zamora, as well as high-profile and controversial storylines in mainstream superhero comics that featured gay and AIDS-related themes. Zamora's conflicts with Rainey were not only considered emotional high points for that season, but are credited with making The Real World a hit show, and with proving that the infant "reality" television format was one that could bring considerable ratings to a network. By July 1995, the series surpassed Beavis and Butt-head as the network's top-rated show during the fourth season, The Real World: London. In 1999, MTV agreed to license off-net syndication rights to the series to October Moon Television.

== Cast member successes ==
Appearing on the program has often served as a springboard to further success, especially in the entertainment industry.

Eric Nies of the New York cast went on to become a model, actor, and television host. His housemate, Kevin Powell, became a successful author, poet, journalist, and politician. Their housemate Heather B. Gardner went on to become a hip-hop music artist under the professional name Heather B.

Los Angeles cast member Beth Stolarczyk has produced men's and women's calendars and television programs featuring reality TV personalities, including herself and other Real World alumni, including Tami Roman (who became a cast member on Basketball Wives and spinoff Basketball Wives LA), 2002–2003 Las Vegas' Trishelle Cannatella, 2002 Chicago's Tonya Cooley and Back to New York's Coral Smith. Stolarczyk, Cannatella, and Miami's Flora Alekseyeun appeared in the May 2002 Playboy magazine, with later issues spotlighting Cannatella's 2002–2003 Las Vegas housemate, Arissa Hill. Cooley appeared on playboy.com. In addition to Playboy magazine, Cannatella has also posed for the online Playboy Cyber Club, as well as for Stuff magazine.

San Francisco alum Judd Winick is a noted comic book writer and artist, with the majority of his work appearing in comic books published by DC Comics, including writing such well known characters as Batman, Green Arrow, and Green Lantern. Winick also published Pedro and Me, a graphic novel about his friendship with fellow castmate Pedro Zamora, who died of AIDS related complications not long after his experience on the show.

London cast member Jacinda Barrett's acting career includes films such as Ladder 49, The Namesake, The Human Stain, and Bridget Jones: The Edge of Reason.

Boston cast member Sean Duffy was elected to the United States House of Representatives for Wisconsin's 7th congressional district in 2010 as a member of the Republican Party and became the 20th United States Secretary of Transportation in January 2025. He is married to San Francisco alum Rachel Campos-Duffy, a conservative TV news personality.

Lindsay Brien of the Seattle cast became a radio and CNN personality.

Hawaii cast member Tecumseh "Teck" Holmes III appeared in films such as National Lampoon's Van Wilder and in TV series such as Friends.

Mike Mizanin has also found fame as a WWE wrestler wrestling under the name "The Miz", a character he debuted during the Back to New York season. His successes have included the WWE Championship.

2002 Chicago cast member Kyle Brandt's acting career includes starring in the soap opera Days of Our Lives. His castmate Tonya Cooley also appeared on an MTV special of True Life: I'm a Reality TV Star. He also works for the NFL Network.

2002–2003 Las Vegas cast members Trishelle Cannatella and Steven Hill appeared in the horror film Scorned. Cannatella has also appeared on other reality shows, such as The Surreal Life, Battle of the Network Reality Stars, and Kill Reality, the latter of which also featured Hill and Cooley.

Paris castmate Mallory Snyder went on to become a model, most notably appearing in Sports Illustrated magazine's annual swimsuit issue in 2005 and 2006.

2004 San Diego castmate Jamie Chung has appeared in various television and film roles, including Dragonball Evolution, Sorority Row, The Hangover Part II, Once Upon a Time, and Lovecraft Country. Cameran Eubanks, also from the 2004 San Diego cast, starred on Bravo's reality series Southern Charm for its first six seasons.

Philadelphia cast member Karamo Brown appeared as a cast member on the TV One original reality series The Next: 15 and is the host on Are You the One? Second Chances. He is also the Culture guide on Netflix's Queer Eye reboot. He currently hosts his own talk show, Karamo.

Washington, D.C., cast member Emily Schromm was voted as the winner of Women's Health's America's Next Fitness Star in August 2014, and will be featured in a series of fitness DVDs.

Portland cast member Jordan Wiseley appeared on the OWN Network original series, Tyler Perry's If Loving You Is Wrong.

Ex-Plosion cast member Cory Wharton went on to become a supporting cast member on Teen Mom OG with his girlfriend Cheyanne Floyd in 2018.

Dozens of former cast members from The Real World and its sister production Road Rules have appeared on the spin-off series The Challenge, which pays $100,000 or more to its winners. Various cast members have also earned livings as public speakers, since Bunim-Murray Productions funded their training in motivational speaking by the Points of Light Foundation in 2002, allowing them to earn between $1,500 and $2,000 for an appearance on the college lecture circuit.

== Residence and facilities ==
The residence is typically elaborate in its décor, and for many seasons was furnished by IKEA. The residence usually includes a pool table, a Jacuzzi, and in many seasons an aquarium, which serves as a metaphor for the show, in that the roommates, who are being taped at all times in their home, are seen metaphorically as fish in a fishbowl. This point is punctuated not only by the fact that the MTV logo title card seen after the closing credits of each episode is designed as an aquarium, but also by a poem that Judd Winick wrote during his stay in the 1994 San Francisco house called "Fishbowl". In some seasons, the group is provided with a shared car to use during their stay, or in the case of the St. Thomas season, a chauffeured motorboat to transport cast members from their Hassel Island residence to Charlotte Amalie.

== Format and structure ==
Each season consists of seven to eight people (in initial seasons ages 18–26 before changing to 21–26 and currently cast for 21–34), usually selected from thousands of applicants from across the country, with the group chosen typically representing different races, sexes, sexual orientations, levels of sexual experience, and religious and political beliefs. Should a cast member decide to move out, or be asked to do so by all his or her roommates, the roommates will often get a replacement, dependent on how much filming time is left.

Cast members are paid a small stipend for their participation in the show. The cast of the first season, for example, was given $2,500. This amount increased to $5,000 before taxes with the first New Orleans season in 2000, and included each cast member's story rights in perpetuity. However, because cast members are not actors playing characters, they do not receive residuals that are routinely paid to actors when a TV show on which they appear is aired and replayed, and are not permitted to use the name of the series when promoting their own business ventures.

Each season begins with the individual members of the house shown leaving home, often for the first time, and/or meeting their fellow housemates while in transit to their new home, or at the house itself. The exception was the Los Angeles season, which premiered with two housemates picking up a third at his Kentucky home and driving in a Winnebago RV to their new home in Los Angeles. The housemates are taped around the clock. The house is outfitted with video cameras mounted on walls to capture more intimate moments, and camera crews consisting of three to six people follow the cast around the house and out in public. In total, approximately 30 cameras are used during production. Each member of the cast is instructed to ignore the cameras and the crew, but are required to wear a battery pack and microphone in order to record their dialogue, though some castmembers have been known to turn off or hide them at times. The only area of the house in which camera access is restricted are the bathrooms.

Despite the initial awkwardness of being surrounded by cameramen, castmembers have stated that they eventually adjust to it, and that their behavior is purely natural, and not influenced by the fact that they are being taped. Winick, an alumnus of the show's third season (San Francisco), adds that cast members eventually stop thinking about the cameras because it is too exhausting not to, and that the fact that their lives were being documented made it seem "more real". Other cast members have related different accounts. Members of the London cast found the cameras burdensome at times, such as Jay Frank and Jacinda Barrett, who felt they intruded on the intimacy of their romantic relationships. Lars Schlichting related an anecdote in which roommate Mike Johnson asked a question when cameras were not present, and then asked the same question five minutes later when cameras were present, which Schlichting adds was not typical of Johnson. Johnson himself has remarked that castmate Barrett "hammed it up a lot," and that roommate Sharon Gitau withheld details of her life out of fear that her grandmother would react negatively. Movement of the roommates outside of the residence is restricted to places that are cleared by producers through contractual arrangements with locations to allow filming.

The producers made an exception to the taping protocol during the third season, when Pedro Zamora requested that he be allowed to go out on a date without the cameras, because the normal anxieties associated with first dates would be exacerbated by the presence of cameras.

=== Confessional ===
At the end of each week, each housemate is required to sit down and be interviewed about the past week's events. Unlike the normal day-to-day taping, these interviews, which are referred to as "confessionals", involve the subject looking directly into the camera while providing opinions and reflective accounts of the week's activities, which are used in the final, edited episodes. The producers instruct the cast to talk about whatever they wish, and to speak in complete sentences, to reinforce the perception on the part of the home viewer that the cast is speaking to them. Winick described this practice as "like therapy without the help". The confessionals were originally conducted by Mary-Ellis Bunim and Jonathan Murray, but were eventually delegated to production staff members like George Verschoor and Thomas Klein. Beginning with the second season (Los Angeles), a small soundproof room was incorporated into each house for this purpose, which itself has also become known as the Confessional in which cast members could record themselves and provide thoughts about house and life events. (The soundproofing practice appears to have been discontinued in later seasons.)

The various casts were often creative in their use of the confessional, which Bunim and Murray referred to as "inspired lunacy", such as a group confessional that the Los Angeles cast conducted on their last day in order to appear less contentious, but which ended with them arguing and storming out, an appearance by San Francisco housemate Judd Winick in a nun's habit, and Miami roommates Melissa Padrón and Flora Alekseyeun dressing up as sex workers for a shared confessional in which they discuss why their roommates did not get along with them. During Mardi Gras, 2000 New Orleans cast member Danny Roberts used the confessional room to engage in a sex act off-camera.

=== Evolution and changes ===
Initially, the show documented the housemates as they struggled to find and maintain jobs and careers in their new locales, with minimal group activities aside from their day-to-day lives in the house and their socializing in the city. The only group activity engineered by the producers during the first season was a trip for the three women to Jamaica. By the second season, sending the entire cast on a vacation and/or short-term local trip would become the norm for most seasons. By the fifth season, the cast would be given an ongoing, season-long activity, with the Miami cast given startup money and a business advisor to begin their own business. This aspect of the show remained in most subsequent seasons. The assignments are obligatory, with casts assigned to work at an after-school daycare program, a radio station, public-access television station, etc. Beginning with the tenth season, a rule was implemented that required a roommate fired from the group job to be evicted from the house and dropped from the cast. Hollywood's Greg Halstead and Cancun's Joey Rozmus were evicted from their respective houses after they were fired from their group jobs. Later seasons provided the cast with pre-approved jobs they could apply for without the firing rule, while other casts took part in internships or did not pursue work.

=== Editing ===
Footage taped throughout each season is edited into episodes (half-hour episodes for the first 19 seasons, one-hour episodes beginning with the twentieth).

== Rules and discipline ==
=== Physical violence ===
Physical violence of any kind is typically not tolerated by the producers. After an incident occurs, producers or cast members are typically given the choice as to whether a violent housemate can stay due to a contract clause that prohibits violence. After an incident during the Seattle season in which Stephen Williams slapped Irene McGee as she moved out, a response to the event was debated by the housemates, who did not witness the incident but viewed a videotape of it. The producers, not wanting to be seen condoning violence, gave the housemates the choice of having him leave, but instead the housemates chose to let him stay, and Williams was ordered to attend an anger management class. During the 2002–2003 Las Vegas season, Brynn Smith and Steven Hill got into an altercation in which Smith threw a fork at Hill. Hill contacted the producers who notified him that it was up to the cast to decide on Smith's fate. The cast let Hill make the ultimate decision, and he chose that Smith could stay. During the Sydney season, Trisha Cummings shoved Parisa Montazaran to the ground during a heated altercation. Producers gave Montazaran the choice as to whether Cummings could stay or leave, and she chose that Cummings had to leave. Denver housemates Tyrie Ballard and Davis Mallory got into an explosive altercation that required production to intervene on-screen and separate the two before any violence occurred. Similarly, Hollywood castmates William Gilbert and Dave Malinosky got into a similar fight with fellow housemate Greg Halstead that also required intervention from production, as well as Gilbert and Malinosky to undergo anger management. During the Portland season, Nia Moore physically attacked Johnny Reilly in retaliation for Reilly purposely throwing a drink on her during a heated altercation, and later got into a physical altercation with Averey Tressler, when Tressler defended Reilly from an attempt by Moore to attack Reilly again with a hair dryer. Unlike most prior seasons where the one assaulted housemate was given the sole choice as to whether the attacker could stay, the Portland cast had its producers decide that only those not involved in the confrontation could decide whether Moore could stay via a majority vote. They chose to let her stay, and producers did not order Moore to anger management, despite subsequent threats to attack other cast members. As a result, Reilly and Tressler chose to leave the loft during that season's final episode. In the final three episodes of the Go Big or Go Home season, castmates Jenna Thomason and Ceejai Jenkins got into two physical altercations while in the house. During the second altercation, Jenkins gave Thomason a black eye and bruises. As a result, both were removed by production due to the altercation.

=== Drug use ===
Cast members are also subject to random drug tests, and a cast member failing a drug test will lead to him or her being evicted from the house. During the Hollywood season, it became known that Joey Kovar, had used large amounts of alcohol, cocaine, ecstasy, methamphetamine, as well as steroids that he used in bodybuilding since he was a teenager, and had suffered near-fatal overdose. Because of the erratic behavior he displayed as a result of this, he was asked to leave the show to pursue treatment. Kovar would later die of opiate intoxication on August 17, 2012, at the age of 29. During the St. Thomas season, Brandon Kane was removed from the house in that season's eleventh episode after testing positive for cocaine use.

=== Property damage ===
Cast members are held responsible for any damage to property that occurred within the house. For example, Brooklyn's J.D. Ordoñez was required to pay $350 after destroying a coffee table in one episode. Cancun's Bronne Bruzgo was evicted from the hotel that served as the cast residence following a drunken incident in which he threw a fire extinguisher from a balcony to a pool below, though he was provided with nearby alternative housing by Student City, the cast's season employer. 2011 Las Vegas' Adam Royer was held responsible for the $3,105 worth of damage that his drunken and disorderly behavior caused to the suite that housed that season's cast.

== Recurring themes ==
=== Prejudice ===
As their experiences on The Real World were often the first time that cast members encountered people of different races or sexual orientations, many episodes documented conflict over these issues. First season housemate Kevin Powell had such arguments with Eric Nies, Julie Gentry, and Rebecca Blasband. The premiere episode of the Los Angeles season depicted regional epithets exchanged between Jon Brennan, Dominic Griffin, and Tami Roman. 1994 San Francisco housemate David "Puck" Rainey's treatment of Pedro Zamora's homosexuality was an issue for Zamora. Flora Alekseyeun, during an argument with her Miami roommate Cynthia Roberts, dismissed what she referred to as Roberts' "black attitude", and their roommate Melissa Padrón, during a heated exchange with openly gay Dan Renzi, called him a "flamer". Racism and religious intolerance was a point of contention among 2000 New Orleans housemates Julie Stoffer, Melissa Howard and Jamie Murray on more than one occasion.

The stereotypical views about black people imparted to Back to New York's Mike Mizanin by his uncle offended Coral Smith and Nicole Mitsch when he related them, and they tried to educate him on African American culture. They were also offended by the fact that biracial roommate Malik Cooper wore a T-shirt with the image of Marcus Garvey, who was against miscegenation, despite the fact that Cooper was of mixed heritage and by his own admission had never dated a black woman.

Philadelphia's Karamo Brown expressed being "borderline racist" towards White people, though he had softened in these feelings by the end of the season. In the Denver season, Davis Mallory and Stephen Nichols confronted each other over Mallory's homosexuality and Nichols' race, and Mallory later used a racial epithet during a drunken argument with black housemate Tyrie Ballard.

During the Sydney season, Persian housemate Parisa Montazaran was offended at an anecdote related by housemate Trisha Cummings, in which Cummings described an Asian McDonald's employee whose command of English was not perfect, though Cummings later insisted that she misworded her anecdote. A similar confrontation occurred during the Brooklyn season between J.D. Ordoñez and Chet Cannon, after a drunk Ordoñez made offensive statements about immigrants, following an incident at a drugstore.

Hollywood's Kimberly Alexander got into an argument with Brianna Taylor, who is African American, and said, "Let's not get ghetto." When roommate William Gilbert saw this as racist, Alexander explained that Taylor had previously described herself as sometimes behaving "ghetto", and was merely referencing that.

During the 2010 New Orleans season, tensions escalated between Ryan Leslie and openly gay Preston Roberson-Charles, amid questions about Leslie's own sexuality, and their mutual use of homophobic slurs. In addition, Roberson-Charles also drew some homophobic remarks from housemate Ryan Knight. During the 2011 San Diego season, tensions arose between Frank Sweeney and his male housemates Zach Nichols and Nate Stodghill over Sweeney's bisexuality, and Nichols later made what he said he intended to be a humorous remark to lesbian roommate Sam McGinn that alluded to gay bashing, to which McGinn took exception. In the Go Big or Go Home season, Jenna Thomason made homophobic and racist comments toward her roommates, causing tension between her and the rest of the cast.

=== Politics and religion ===
Los Angeles housemate Jon Brennan disagreed with Tami Roman's decision to have an abortion, and argued with castmate Aaron Behle, and Behle's girlfriend, Erin, who were both pro-choice. Rachel Campos, a conservative Republican member of the 1994 San Francisco cast, clashed with liberal roommates Mohammed Bilal and Judd Winick. Paris housemates Simon Sherry-Wood and Leah Gillingwater argued over the Iraq War, and in a subsequent episode, Chris "C.T." Tamburello became confrontational and threatening toward Adam King, referencing the war himself. Nehemiah Clark, of the Austin cast, expressed disapproval of President George W. Bush and the Iraq War, coming into conflict with Rachel Moyal, who served in Iraq as a combat medic for the U.S. Army. Sydney's Dunbar Flinn angered Parisa Montazaran and Trisha Cummings with his comments about Jesus and the Bible. The 2008 United States Presidential election served to highlight the political differences among the Brooklyn cast. In the Washington, D.C., season premiere, atheist Ty Ruff got into an argument with Christian roommates Ashley Lindley and Mike Manning.

=== Romance ===
Many cast members tried to maintain long-distance relationships that predated their time on the show, though remaining faithful was often a challenge. Miami's Flora Alekseyeun attempted to maintain relationships with two boyfriends simultaneously. 2000 New Orleans' Danny Roberts cheated on his boyfriend Paul, who was stationed in the military. During the Seattle season, Nathan Blackburn's girlfriend worried about their relationship. Shauvon Torres departed from the Sydney house to reconcile with her ex-fiancé. Her housemates, Trisha Cummings, KellyAnne Judd and Dunbar Merrin, all flirted, dated or had sex with people other than their significant others back home. Cancun's Jonna Mannion, Washington D.C.'s Josh Colón and 2011 Las Vegas' Nany González severed long-term relationships following suspicions and admissions of infidelity, and in the case of González, after she began a relationship with housemate Adam Royer.

Some cast members developed romantic relationships with their castmates. 1994 San Francisco roommates Pam Ling and Judd Winick have since married, as have their roommate Rachel Campos and Sean Duffy of the Boston cast. In the 2002–2003 Las Vegas season, Trishelle Cannatella and Steven Hill consummated a romance during the show, while their roommates Irulan Wilson and Alton Williams began a relationship that continued for three years after they moved out of the Las Vegas suite. The Austin cast spawned two relationships, between Wes Bergmann and Johanna Botta, as well as Danny Jamieson and Melinda Stolp; the latter couple married in August 2008 but divorced in spring 2010. Hollywood's William Gilbert became involved in a relationship with The Real World: Key West alumna Janelle Casanave, who made guest appearances in several episodes during that season. However, their relationship ended when Gilbert later became attracted to his roommate Brittni Sherrod. Portland housemates Johnny Reilly and Averey Tressler developed a mutual attraction, leading to a relationship that they continued for one year after filming ended.

=== Sexuality ===
The level of sexual experience varies among a given season's cast members. New York's Julie Gentry, Los Angeles' Jon Brennan and Aaron Behle, 1994 San Francisco's Cory Murphy and Rachel Campos, Seattle's Rebecca Lord, 2000 New Orleans' Matt Smith and Julie Stoffer, Paris' Mallory Snyder, Austin's Lacey Buehler, Brooklyn's Chet Cannon and Atlanta's Meagan Melancon, for example, all stated they were virgins during their respective seasons. On the other end of the spectrum was 2000 New Orleans' David Broom, Cancun's Joey Rozmus, and 2011 Las Vegas's Heather Cooke, who took pride in their promiscuity with various sexual partners during their respective seasons. Denver's Jenn Grijalva and Alex Smith, Sydney's KellyAnne Judd and Dunbar Flinn, Cancun's Ayiiia Elizarraras, and 2011 Las Vegas' Nany González and Heather Marter were sexually intimate with multiple castmates during their respective seasons.

More than once, fellow housemates have been involved in pregnancy scares, such as Steven Hill and Trishelle Cannatella during the 2002–2003 Las Vegas season, Cohutta Grindstaff and KellyAnne Judd during the Sydney season, and Leroy Garrett and Naomi Defensor during the 2011 Las Vegas season.

London's Sharon Gitau expressed difficulty with relationships, and with being open about this and other aspects of her life with her castmates.

Overt sexual behavior was minimal during the show's early seasons, relegated mostly to discussion. In subsequent seasons, the level of sexual activity greatly increased, beginning with the Miami season, which depicted or touched upon activities such as exhibitionism, frottage, voyeurism, and threesomes.

=== Unrequited love ===
Jon Brennan's Los Angeles roommates speculated that he had developed a crush, or possibly had fallen in love, with Irene Berrera. 2000 New Orleans' Melissa Howard was attracted to Jamie Murray, who did not reciprocate. Their roommate Julie Stoffer harbored similar feelings for Matt Smith, who also did not reciprocate. Back to New York's Lori Trespicio developed an attraction for Kevin Dunn, though he only saw her as a friend.

=== Departed housemates ===
Many times, housemates have left the Real World house (and the cast) before production was completed, due to conflicts with other roommates, personal issues, homesickness or violations of work assignment policies. Replacement roommates would sometimes move in as a result. Housemates who departed over personal conflicts with other housemates include Los Angeles' David Edwards, San Francisco's David "Puck" Rainey, Sydney's Trisha Cummings, 2010 New Orleans' Ryan Leslie and Ex-Plosion's Ashley Mitchell, though Rainey, Leslie and Mitchell continued to appear in subsequent episodes following their departures. Housemates who moved out due to personal issues back home include Hawaii's Justin Deabler, Sydney's Shauvon Torres and Portland's Joi Niemeyer. Housemates who moved out due to homesickness include 2004 San Diego's Frankie Abernathy and Washington D.C.'s Erika Wasilewski. Housemates who were evicted after being fired from group work assignments include Hollywood's Greg Halstead and Cancun's Joey Rozmus, though Rozmus returned by that season's finale. Housemates who were evicted for either physical altercations or reckless behavior include 2011 Las Vegas' Adam Royer, Go Big or Go Home's Jenna Thomason and Ceejai Jenkins, Bad Blood's Theo King-Bradley and Peter Romeo and Atlanta's Clint Wright, though Royer later returned for that season's twelfth episode.

Housemates have also departed for other reasons. Irene Barrera moved out of the Los Angeles house when she got married. Irene McGee claimed a relapse of Lyme disease was the reason for her moving out of the Seattle house, though in a previously unaired interview from her time on the show that aired during the 2000 reunion show, The Real World Reunion 2000, she explained that the main reason was her ethical objections to aspects of the show's production, which she characterized as an inauthentic environment designed to fabricate drama and conflict, and not the social experiment it was portrayed to be. McGee further explained that this was an unhealthy environment for her to live in, and that the stress and manipulation of the production exacerbated her illness. Joey Kovar moved out of the Hollywood house, fearing a drug and alcohol relapse after spending time in rehab, though he returned for that season's finale. St. Thomas' Brandon Kane was the first cast member ever evicted for failing a random drug test during filming. Ex-Plosion's Lauren Ondersma and Bad Blood's Tyara Hooks departed after finding out they were pregnant.

=== On-screen marriage ===
Irene Barrera got married during the Los Angeles season. Pedro Zamora exchanged wedding vows with his boyfriend, Sean Sasser, during the 1994 San Francisco season.

=== Coping with illness ===
Pedro Zamora lived with AIDS. He succumbed to complications related to the disease on November 11, 1994, hours after the 1994 San Francisco season finale aired. 2004 San Diego housemate Frankie Abernathy suffered from cystic fibrosis. She died on July 9, 2007.

Philadelphia's Sarah Burke, Key West's Paula Meronek, and Skeletons' Violetta Milerman each suffered from an eating disorder, anorexia and/or bulimia. Denver's Colie Edison battled mononucleosis. Cancun's Ayiiia Elizarraras had a history of drug abuse and self-harming, the latter of which manifested during that season's fifth episode. She received treatment for it after filming ended, and recorded a public service announcement on the condition that it aired at the end of that episode. 2010 New Orleans' Ryan Leslie suffered from severe obsessive compulsive disorder, which had deleterious effects on his relationship with the rest of the cast.

One recurring illness with which a number of cast members have dealt is addiction. While cast members sometimes become inebriated in social situations during filming, Hawaii's Ruthie Alcaide and Hollywood's Joey Kovar entered treatment programs for drug or alcohol addiction during filming. Other cast members have recounted past troubles with addiction that they had endured prior to filming, including 2002 Chicago's Chris Beckman, Hollywood's Brianna Taylor, 2010 New Orleans' Ryan Knight, St. Thomas' Brandon Kane, and Skeletons' Madison Walls.

== Seasons ==
Season #	Title	City	Year(s) Aired	Episodes
1	The Real World: New York	New York City, New York	1992	13
2	The Real World: Los Angeles	Los Angeles, California	1993	21
3	The Real World: San Francisco	San Francisco, California	1994	20
4	The Real World: London	London, England	1995	23
5	The Real World: Miami	Miami, Florida	1996	22
6	The Real World: Boston	Boston, Massachusetts	1997	23
7	The Real World: Seattle	Seattle, Washington	1998	20
8	The Real World: Hawaii	Honolulu, Hawaii	1999	23
9	The Real World: New Orleans	New Orleans, Louisiana	2000	23
10	The Real World: Back to New York	New York City, New York	2001	22
11	The Real World: Chicago	Chicago, Illinois	2002	24
12	The Real World: Las Vegas	Las Vegas, Nevada	2002–2003	28
13	The Real World: Paris	Paris, France	2003	25
14	The Real World: San Diego	San Diego, California	2004	26
15	The Real World: Philadelphia	Philadelphia, Pennsylvania	2004–2005	26
16	The Real World: Austin	Austin, Texas	2005	24
17	The Real World: Key West	Key West, Florida	2006	25
18	The Real World: Denver	Denver, Colorado	2006–2007	28
19	The Real World: Sydney	Sydney, Australia	2007–2008	24
20	The Real World: Hollywood	Los Angeles, California	2008	13
21	The Real World: Brooklyn	New York City, New York	2009	13
22	The Real World: Cancun	Cancún, Mexico	2009	12
23	The Real World: D.C.	Washington, D.C.	2009–2010	14
24	The Real World: New Orleans	New Orleans, Louisiana	2010	12
25	The Real World: Las Vegas	Las Vegas, Nevada	2011	13
26	The Real World: San Diego	San Diego, California	2011	12
27	The Real World: St. Thomas	Charlotte Amalie, Virgin Islands	2012	12
28	The Real World: Portland	Portland, Oregon	2013	12
29	Real World: Ex-Plosion	San Francisco, California	2014	12
30	Real World: Skeletons	Chicago, Illinois	2014–2015	13
31	Real World: Go Big or Go Home	Las Vegas, Nevada	2016	12
32	Real World Seattle: Bad Blood	Seattle, Washington	2016–2017	12
33	The Real World: Atlanta	Atlanta, Georgia	2019	12

Note: Seasons 20–32 aired one-hour episodes, while seasons 1–19 and 33 aired 30-minute episodes.

=== Homecoming ===
In addition to the main edition of the show, a handful of reunion specials of The Real World have been produced, where the casts from a particular season were reunited for another season of the show. The original Vegas reunion followed the cast as they returned to stay in their original residence with planned activities for them. The reunion series that began in 2021 (titled The Real World: Homecoming) maintained this basic premise while having an additional element of having the original cast occasionally watch footage from their original show and answering prompts.

Season #	Title	Original Season	City	Year(s) Aired	Episodes
1	Reunited: The Real World Las Vegas	The Real World: Las Vegas	Las Vegas, Nevada	2007 (5 years later)	7
2	The Real World Homecoming: New York	The Real World: New York	New York City, New York	2021 (29 years later)	6
3	The Real World Homecoming: Los Angeles	The Real World: Los Angeles	Los Angeles, California	2021 (28 years later)	8
4	The Real World Homecoming: New Orleans	The Real World: New Orleans	New Orleans, Louisiana	2022 (22 years later)	8

== Spinoffs and related projects ==
In 2008, prior to the airing of the Hollywood season, the first-ever Real World Awards Bash aired on MTV. Viewers voted the Austin season as their favorite season.

Since the introduction of The Real World, Bunim/Murray has introduced a number of other reality shows, most notably Road Rules, in which five strangers (six in later seasons) are sent off in a RV (with the exception of the eighth season) and asked to travel to various locales and complete certain tasks to eventually gain a "handsome reward". Other Bunim/Murray productions include The Challenge, which pits teams of alumni from both shows against each other in physical competitions.

Bunim-Murray also produced Pedro, a 2008 film by director Nick Oceano, which dramatized the life of Pedro Zamora, including his stay in the Real World house. The film, Bunim/Murray's first scripted project since the original unaired "Real World" concept, was an Official Selection at the 2008 Toronto International Film Festival.

Two international localized editions were produced in the 1990s, The Real World: Stockholm and The Real World: Visby.

In February 2021, The New York Times reported that Paramount was planning to develop future seasons for its streaming service Paramount+. The following month, the spin-off The Real World Homecoming: New York premiered on Paramount+, which reunited the cast of the original 1992 season. In September 2021, the series was renewed for two more seasons, with the second reuniting most of the cast of The Real World: Los Angeles. Because the majority of the original series' casts between the 3rd and 8th seasons declined any offers to return (and a London-set reunion was unconsidered because of the cost and logistical issues of holding it outside the U.S.), the third edition jumped ahead to a reunion of the 9th season in New Orleans, which like the RH: NY season had all of the original cast members return. The show has since been removed from Paramount+ streaming archives and as of 2025 there are no plans for any future "Homecoming" editions.

=== The Real World Movie: The Lost Season ===
In 2002, MTV also produced a made-for-TV movie, The Real World Movie: The Lost Season, ostensibly about a season of The Real World whose cast members are terrorized by a rejected would-be member.

== Criticism ==
=== Authenticity ===
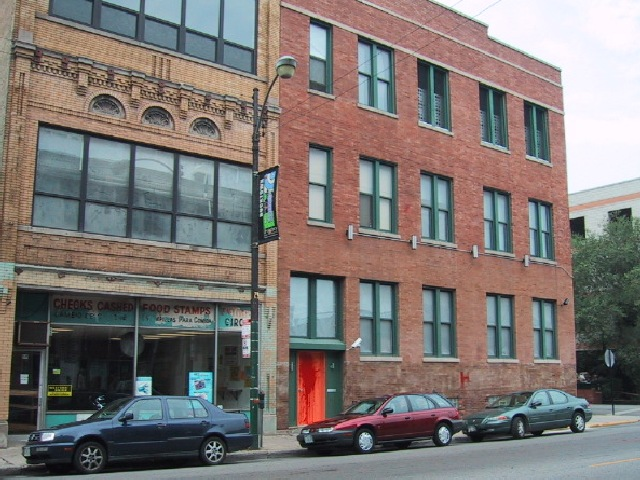
The Real World: Chicago residence on July 16, 2001. Note the vandalism (red paint on the door) and street-level brick that has been worn due to graffiti and its continued removal due to protests.

As with other reality shows, The Real World has received criticism for being staged. During a reunion show featuring the first four Real World casts, Heather Gardner, of the original New York cast, asked some members of the 1994 San Francisco cast if their situations were real. She noted that situations from the original season seemed to repeat themselves in the other incarnations, stopping short of accusing them of acting. On an edition of the E! True Hollywood Story that spotlighted the series, cast member Jon Brennan revealed that he was asked by the producers to state on the air that he felt hatred towards housemate Tami Roman for her decision to have an abortion, and that he refused to do so, stating that although he disagreed with her decision, he did not feel hatred towards her. Another accusation is that producers selectively edit material in order to give the false impression of certain emotional reactions or statements from the castmates. New York cast member Rebecca Blasband says producers paid a man $100 to ask her out on a date, and that she terminated that plan when she learned of it. She also says that the argument she and Kevin Powell had in the seventh episode of that season was edited to make both of them appear more extreme.

Some critics see the very concept of being in "the real world" as a misnomer, asserting that in the real world, people do not live in luxurious dwellings for free, are not given jobs in the media without any effort, and are not taken to exotic locations for free, a "reaction" that has been "experienced" by Judd Winick, who calls the series "reality in context".

=== Behavior of housemates ===
The early seasons have been reassessed in light of history, and in comparison to that of later seasons, particularly in terms of the cast. Writing in 2011, Meredith Blake of The A.V. Club found the first-season cast's career goals to be "ambitious, articulate, and thoughtful", particularly in the context of the time when the show was produced, when cast members may have sought to be on TV to further their career goals, but not to be reality TV personalities, which was not yet a common goal at the time, stating, "What's so curious about the show's somewhat chilly critical reception is that, compared to today's reality fare—Jersey Shore, the Kardashians, the various Real Housewives—The Real World: New York now seems incredibly, achingly earnest, bracingly raw, and sweetly idealistic." Blake contrasts this with the casts of later seasons, such as that of 2011, who tend to be defined more by their pasts than by their career goals, and who are never unaware of their own onscreen "narrative". In addition, the later seasons earned the series a reputation for immature or irresponsible behavior on the part of the cast, which Nola.com has described as being "sometimes fit for a police report". On the final track of his Become the Media spoken word album, activist Jello Biafra discusses a conversation he had with The Real World: Seattle cast member Irene McGee, who was slapped by castmate Stephen Williams, saying:

We know Real World is not the real world. I recently met a woman named Irene McGee who quit this show and said not even the house was real. The fridges were all filled to the brim with Vlasic pickles delivered daily by the crate load along with gallons of Nantucket Nectar. If she drank anything else, the crew took it from her hand and made sure the Nantucket Nectar label was facing the camera instead. When she walked out, another guy in the cast of Real World hit her and the camera guy did nothing ... When she spoke out, MTV sued her. And Entertainment Weekly rated Irene getting smash mouthed the 47th most interesting event on TV that whole year ... Can't you MTV think of a better way to raise audience awareness of domestic violence than to make it look cool?

McGee has toured colleges to discuss media manipulation and the falsehoods of reality television. She later started a youth-oriented radio show/podcast, No One's Listening, covering a wide range of pop-culture and media-related issues.

The show has also been accused of encouraging or glorifying certain cast members' alcohol abuse and sexual antics, beginning with the show's 2002 Las Vegas season. The Real World: Hawaii (1999) season was also met with concerns and criticism surrounding the glorification of alcohol on the show, notably with then-21-year-old cast member Ruthie Alcaide's heavy drinking on the premiere episode; after a long night out, Alcaide blacked-out. She was filmed by the camera crew being cared-for at home by the other housemates, and even vomiting in the shower; eventually, an ambulance was called. After Alcaide was hospitalized, producers were filmed speaking to Alcaide about her drinking, which, notably, did not immediately stop at that time.

There is a larger perception that the show has become increasingly superficial, with respect to the drama and angst depicted on the part of cast members. As critic Benjamin Wallace-Wells put it:

No longer an outlet for twentysomethings to brood about their future careers, the show has become a cyclic three-month on-air party for young adults to mingle in hot tubs and obsess about the present. The locales have changed from creative meccas like New York and London to vacation spots like Las Vegas and Hawaii. MTV has rejiggered the show to require characters to engage in artificial, season-long contests or projects – like putting together a fashion show – which the characters embrace in the way most American teenagers experience spring break: as a big party.

A 2006 comment from LA Weekly's Nikki Finke reflects the same sentiments:

The show that once seriously delved into hot-button issues like homosexuality, AIDS, racism, religion and abortion was now purposely pushing someone's buttons to have that person implode on air.

The Parents Television Council, which has frequently criticized MTV, has also frequently criticized The Real World for its overtly sexual content. In addition, that organization contends that because MTV routinely reruns Real World episodes with a simple "TV-14" rating without the "L" (language) descriptor, parents cannot block out the show with a V-Chip, although countering reports claim that the V-Chip does not totally rely on content descriptors added to the general ratings to work. An episode of The Real World: San Diego, that was broadcast in January 2004, came under intense criticism from both the PTC and American Family Association for its sexual content.

=== Diversity ===
In December 2005, Aaron Gillego, a columnist for The Advocate, criticized the series for having never cast an Asian man in the then-13 years of its existence, opining that Asian women have been cast on the show because heterosexual men have been socialized by the media to think of them as exotic beauties or sex objects, but that Asian men have been largely invisible in popular media. As of 2018, an Asian man has never been cast in the 25 years of the show's existence.

== Parodies ==
- Dutch TV producer Erik Latour claims that the ideas for The Real World were directly derived from his television show Nummer 28, which aired in 1991 on Dutch television.
- Video artist Eileen Maxson's short film Tape 5925: Amy Goodrow is set up as an audition tape for The Real World, a familiar component of the series' casting specials and season openers. Maxson portrays the title character, a sensitive and awkward young woman whose main hobby is paper craft, and reveals a surprising sexual encounter between her teenage self and a teacher. The resulting confession lands on the desk of a jaded MTV employee, who fast-forwards through the details of her depressing story. The video was named one of the "sweet 16" experimental film and video works of 2003 by Village Voice media critic Ed Halter.
- On Happy Endings, three of the core characters met during the season of The Real World titled The Real World: Sacramento. In the episode "More Like Stanksgiving", the characters watch clips from an episode of their The Real World season. The fictional season was said to have not aired due to one of the cast members burning down the house.

== See also ==
- Road Rules – A road-trip inspired spin-off, also from Bunim & Murray.
- The Challenge – A reality competition spin-off, featuring The Real World and Road Rules castmembers, also from Bunim & Murray.
- Terrace House – A Japanese show that is similar in premises to The Real World, that airs internationally on Netflix.
- List of programs broadcast by MTV
- List of The Real World cast members
- List of The Real World seasons
