= Nummer 28 =

Dutch reality soap

Nummer 28 is a Dutch reality soap, directed by Joost Tholens and produced by Today TV, shown as part of the youth show "1-4-U" of public broadcaster KRO in 1991. The name of the show was directly derived from the number of the house in that street (Number 28). The show ran only for one season.

For this show, seven strangers (all starting students) were put together in a student house in Amsterdam, and their lives were followed for several months. Unlike later versions of the concept, no game-aspects were included in the show, and the inhabitants of the house were also not isolated from the outside world. Every week a broadcast of about 20 minutes showed the experiences of last week of all inhabitants.

The show included a heavy use of soundtrack music and the interspersing of events on screen with after-the-fact "confessionals" recorded by cast members, that serve as narration.

The same concept was used one year later in 1992 by MTV in their new series The Real World, and in a similar show on the BBC. Erik Latour, creator of the concept, has long claimed that The Real World was directly inspired by his show, but he never succeeded in receiving any recognition.
