= The Real World: Stockholm =

Swedish television series

The Real World: Stockholm is the first reality television show to be broadcast on Swedish television. Based on the successful American TV show The Real World, the show premiered on 1 October 1995 on TV1000. Following the show's success, The Real World: Visby aired in 1996, but it became the last Real World season in Sweden following poor ratings.

== Visby ==
The Real World: Visby was broadcast on TV1000 and ZTV in late 1996. It served as second season of the show after the success of The Real World: Stockholm. It was the last Swedish season as the ratings dropped too low.
