= The Real World: Atlanta =

- Season 33
- Starring: Arely Avitua; Clint Wright; Dondre Randolph; Justin Blu; Meagan Melancon; Tovah Marx; Yasmin Almokhamad
- No. of episodes: 12

Release
- Original network: Facebook Watch
- Original release: June 13 – August 29, 2019

Season chronology
- ← Previous; Real World Seattle: Bad Blood

The Real World: Atlanta is the thirty-third and final season of MTV's reality television series The Real World, which focuses on a group of diverse strangers living together for several months in a different city each season as cameras document their lives and interpersonal relationships. This is the first season to be distributed through Facebook Watch via MTV Entertainment Studios and Bunim/Murray Productions. It premiered concurrently with two international localized versions: El Mundo Real in Mexico City and a version in Bangkok; a bonus clip was released online showing all three casts, minus Clint, meeting over video.

On May 20, 2019, it was announced that the season would premiere on June 13, 2019. Most episodes premiered at 9pm Eastern with some having live chats with the cast, excluding episodes 1 and 4 that premiered at noon Eastern.

This is the only season of the show not to have any participant later compete on The Challenge.

== Season changes ==
This is the first season since Season 28 to include the definite article The as part of the series's name, although it retains the new style of the logo introduced in season 29. It is also the first since season 28 to not have a twist for the season. The show's traditional opening sequence was brought back as well, with a modification to reflect the show now being streamed. Casting for this season was expanded to an age range of 21–34, leading to an older cast.

== Employment ==
Beginning in the 28th season, certain jobs in the area were approved by production that the cast had the liberty to apply for independently if desired. However, not all jobs make it into the episodes. Clint worked at Big Sky Buckhead bar as a bartender.

== Residence ==
The Real World was filmed at the Urban Oasis Bed and Breakfast in Atlanta, Georgia.

== Cast ==
Cast member	Age^{1}	Hometown
Arely Avitua	21	Joplin, Missouri
Arely is an aspiring nurse, DACA recipient and mother of a four-year-old boy. She came to the United States as a toddler from Mexico and recently faced a setback when she was unable to take her nursing exam due to her DACA status. She is the first mother to be ever be cast on the show, and the third parent.
Clint Wright	28	Potterville, Michigan
Clint was chosen from three pre-selected finalists by Facebook users on the show's page. He is a fourth generation farmer and has a large Instagram following.
Dondre Randolph	25	Houston, Texas
Dondre is a pansexual African-American Republican in the process of coming out to friends and family, and who supports Donald Trump. He graduated from the University of Houston.
Justin Blu	26	Atlanta, Georgia
Justin is a graduate student at Georgia State University focused on African-American equality and social injustice issues. He is in a long-distance relationship.
Meagan Melancon	23	Baton Rouge, Louisiana
Meagan is a broadcast reporter who graduated from the University of Southern Mississippi. She is a Catholic virgin waiting until marriage. She sought out joining the show to meet people from other walks of life.
Tovah Marx	27	Scottsdale, Arizona
Tovah is a University of Arizona graduate student in clinical psychology who is a social worker who dreams of having her own foster home. She is working on moving beyond a traumatic past and exploring her independence. She is Jewish.
Yasmin Almokhamad	27	New York, New York
Yasmin is a pansexual art teacher at a youth detention center. She grew up in Seattle with a Christian mother and Muslim father, and supports body positivity organizations.

^1 Age at start of filming

=== Duration of cast ===
Cast member	Episodes											
Cast member	1	2	3	4	5	6	7	8	9	10	11	12
Arely	Featured	Featured	Featured	Featured	Featured	Featured	Featured	Featured	Featured	Featured	Featured	Featured
Dondre	Featured	Featured	Featured	Featured	Featured	Featured	Featured	Featured	Featured	Featured	Featured	Featured
Justin	Featured	Featured	Featured	Featured	Featured	Featured	Featured	Featured	Featured	Featured	Featured	Featured
Meagan	Featured	Featured	Featured	Featured	Featured	Featured	Featured	Featured	Featured	Featured	Featured	Featured
Tovah	Featured	Featured	Featured	Featured	Featured	Featured	Featured	Featured	Featured	Featured	Featured	Featured
Yasmin	Featured	Featured	Featured	Featured	Featured	Featured	Featured	Featured	Featured	Featured	Featured	Featured
Clint	Featured	Featured	Featured	Featured	Featured	Featured	Featured	Featured	Featured	Featured	Featured	Removed (Note: Clint was removed from the house in the season finale for breaking production rules and intimidating behavior.)

== Episodes ==
No. overall	No. in season	Title	Original release date
603	1	"Week 1: The Real World is Back!"	June 13, 2019
The future roommates meet in Atlanta. Upon meeting her, Dondre immediately confronts Arely about her DACA status. Clint is attracted to Tovah, but she is not sure whether she wants to be in a relationship or not.
604	2	"Week 2: Who Will Hook Up First?"	June 20, 2019
The roommates visit a strip club, but Meagan feels uncomfortable. Once at home, Tovah and Clint share a bed for the night. Tovah thinks that Justin's views about white supremacy are divisive, Clint agrees with her, but Yasmin is annoyed at them. Arely's ex-boyfriend calls her and reveals he is not happy about her being on The Real World, Yasmin and Tovah think he is being emotionally abusive towards Arely. The cast attends a memorial following Nipsey Hussle's passing.
605	3	"Week 3: The House Comes Apart"	June 27, 2019
Clint and Dondre get in a fight during a night out, Clint starts being aggressive and is taken momentarily out of the house. This causes Tovah to have doubts about Clint, but, once he gets back in the house, the two grow closer and later have sex for the first time. Meagan tells Dondre that she is not comfortable around gay people because of what's written in the Bible, but Tovah and Dondre point out that a lot of things in the Bible are overlooked everyday. Meagan starts challenging what she has believed her whole life.
606	4	"Week 4: Roommate Sex: The New Normal?"	July 4, 2019
Clint feels Tovah is spending more time with their roommates, rather than himself, he confronts Tovah about it, but she distances herself even more. Meagan looks for a guy to flirt with, but her struggles with self-confidence get in the way, Yasmin writes her a letter about self-love to show her support. Dondre has a change of heart about undocumented immigrants after a day with Arely and Justin.
607	5	"Week 5: Secrets Revealed"	July 11, 2019
Tovah reveals to her roommates that she was raped when she was still a teenager, Clint shows his support and this grows them closer. Justin says he does not support gay people's lifestyle, Dondre thinks his views are homophobic since they exclude gay people that are part of the black community that Justin would like to be a leader of.
608	6	"Week 6: Meagan Stands Her Ground"	July 18, 2019
Arely has a discussion with his baby daddy about the custody of their son and contacts a lawyer about the issue. During a night out, Meagan and Tovah spend a lot of time together, Clint gets angry because of it and lashes out on Meagan, accusing her of being a "jersey chaser". Meagan doesn't think she did anything wrong and snaps back at him. The other roommates are proud of Meagan, while Tovah is the only one defending Clint because she thinks he has some inner struggles. Meagan is disappointed in her friend and thinks she is stupid for dating someone with rage problems.
609	7	"Week 7: A Painful Choice"	July 25, 2019
Yasmin is stressed because of her financial struggles, she is in debt and does not know whether she is going to have an apartment to come back to. During a night out Meagan flirts with a guy and Clint lashes out on her once again, Dondre and Tovah get involved as well. The fight escalates quickly and ends up in Clint and Dondre getting sent to a hotel for fighting. Tovah questions whether she wants to stay in the house without Clint or not.
610	8	"Week 8: Don't Make Me Go Home"	August 1, 2019
Upon agreeing on consuming less alcohol, both Clint and Dondre are allowed to stay in the house, but Meagan is frustrated because she thinks nothing is going to change. Yasmin is a panelist in a plus size body positive organization and reveals her inner struggles. Clint tells his mom he would like to pursue other things and not necessarily the family farm, and later asks Tovah to move in together, but she gets scared and thinks it is too early.
611	9	"Week 9: Road Trip!"	August 8, 2019
The roommates travel to Savannah and try to have fun at the beach. Dondre starts thinking that Tovah and Clint are depicting him as aggressive because of his black skin, but Tovah denies everything. Arely's ex-boyfriend comes to visit and she confronts him about his controlling behaviour, he feels cornered but says he will try to be a better person. Clint feels Tovah is not committed to their relationship and keeps asking her about it, which leads to a nasty break up between the two.
612	10	"Week 10: Pregnancy Scare!"	August 15, 2019
During a night out, Clint meets a girl named Shay and he is immediately attracted by her. Tovah is upset because of it, and also she is afraid she could be pregnant, but she refuses to tell Clint about it. The test turns out negative, but Dondre thinks Tovah is doing everything for attention and that the test is fake, he later reveals his suspects to Clint. Arely's mother comes to visit, but asks to remain anonymous since she is undocumented and could be deported, Dondre talks to her and starts reconsidering his political views on immigration.
613	11	"Week 11: Vanished Into The Night"	August 22, 2019
Dondre goes out with a guy named Monte, but their date does not end well when Dondre abrasively asks his date why he is single along with other off-putting behavior. The new abortion law in Georgia sparks a discussion between the roommates: Yasmin, Tovah, Arely and Justin support abortion rights, while Meagan and Dondre are anti-abortion. For his 29th birthday, Clint starts heavily drinking again despite agreeing to be on an alcohol limit after his fight with Dondre, and later runs away from production.
614	12	"Week 12: One Last Surprise"	August 29, 2019
Clint is evicted from the house for his reckless behaviour, but decides to remain in Atlanta for the time being even though Tovah blocked his number. After a prank by Dondre, Meagan faces her insecurities and decides not to wear any make-up for the last day of filming.

== After filming ==
Clint Wright was charged for domestic assault and arrested in Nashville on May 25, 2020.
