= Real World: Go Big or Go Home =

Coordinates: 36°10′15.5″N 115°08′25.6″W

- Season 31
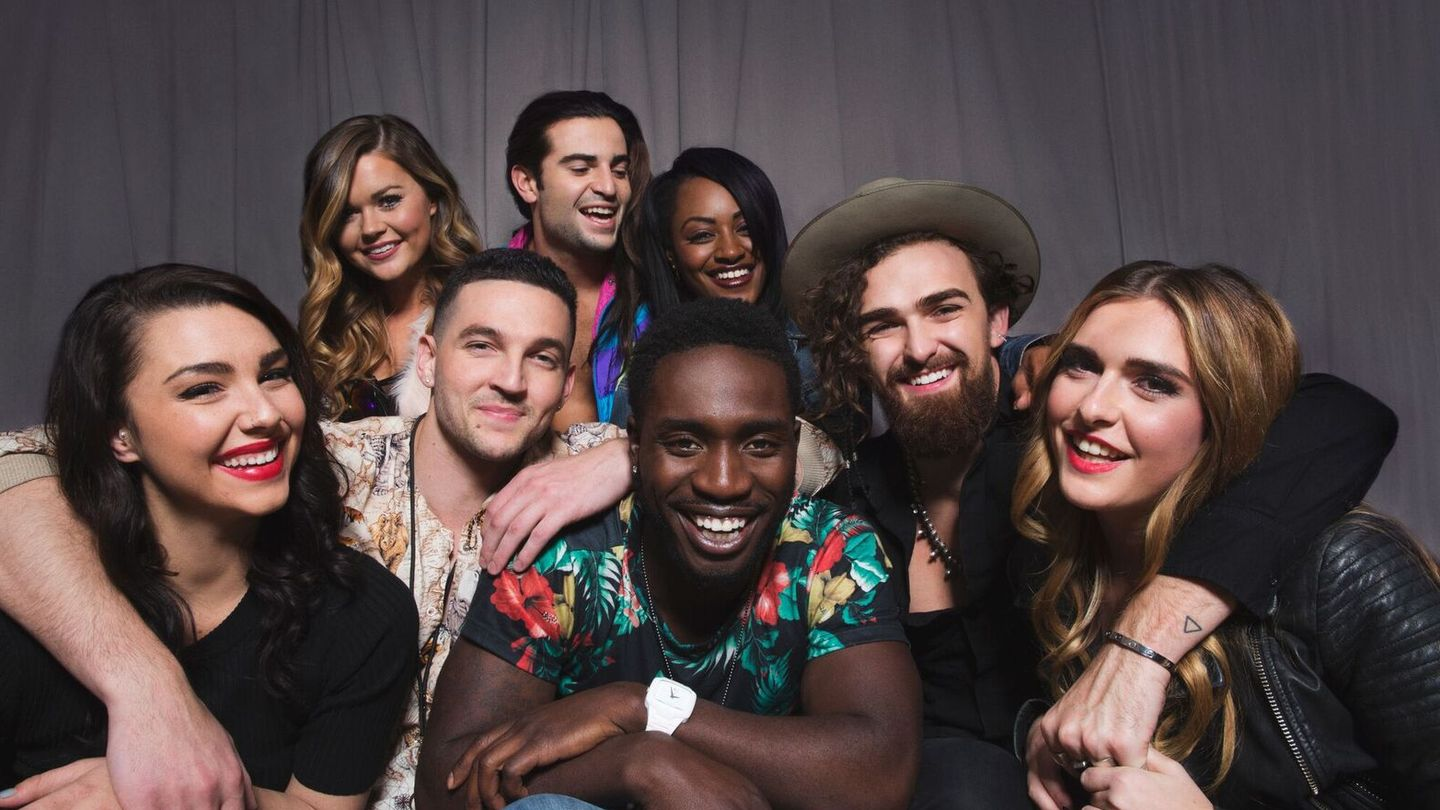
- The cast of Real World: Go Big or Go Home
- Starring: CeeJai' Jenkins; Chris Ammon Hall; Dean Bart-Plange; Dione Mariani; Jenna Thomason; Kailah Casillas; Sabrina Kennedy; Dylan Moore
- No. of episodes: 12

Release
- Original network: MTV
- Original release: March 17 – May 26, 2016

Season chronology
- ← Previous; Real World: Skeletons Next → Real World Seattle: Bad Blood

Real World: Go Big or Go Home is the thirty-first season of MTV's reality television series Real World, which focuses on a group of diverse strangers living together for several months in a different city each season, as cameras document their lives and interpersonal relationships. It is the fourth season to be filmed in the Mountain States region of the United States, specifically in Nevada after The Real World: Las Vegas (2011).

The season featured a total of eight (initially seven) people who lived in a penthouse suite in Downtown Las Vegas and follows a twist from the previous two seasons. Las Vegas was first reported as the location for the 31st season by the website DTLV.com on September 15, 2015. It is the third season of Real World to be filmed in Las Vegas and the ninth season to take place in a city that had hosted a previous season, following the twelfth and twenty-fifth seasons, which aired in 2002–03 and 2011, respectively. Production began on October 9, 2015, and concluded on December 16, 2015 totaling up to 70 days of filming.

On January 13, 2016, Entertainment Weekly reported that the season will be titled Go Big or Go Home. An additional twist is that it features the cast members performing Road Rules-type missions in order to remain on the show. Unlike Road Rules, some missions will be individual-based, some will involve a portion of the group, and some will be team-based. The season premiered on March 17, 2016, and concluded on May 26, 2016, with the season finale, consisting of 12 episodes; it is the first season of the series to premiere simultaneously on MTV and the MTV app's livestream.

== Season changes ==
On this season, cast members have to undergo missions to stay in the house (either by an individual, some or all), similar to the missions based on Road Rules. If one cast member chose not to do or fail to complete the mission, they are forced to leave the group.

== Employment ==
Beginning in the 28th season, certain jobs in the area were approved by production that the cast had the liberty to apply for independently if desired. Kailah and Chris worked at Downtown Podcast in Downtown Las Vegas, but this went unaired.

== Residence ==
In contrast to the previous two seasons in Las Vegas, which were filmed in 2002–03 at the Palms Casino Resort and in 2011 at the Hard Rock Hotel and Casino, the residence for this season was in a converted penthouse suite at Gold Spike in Downtown Las Vegas.

== Cast ==
This was the fifth season of Real World to feature a roster of eight roommates living together. The season started with seven cast members until the additional roommate was introduced in the ninth episode.

Cast member	Age^{1}	Hometown
CeeJai' Jenkins	23	Atlanta, Georgia
CeeJai' is an aspiring lawyer and actor who recently earned her associate degree from Thomas Nelson Community College. CeeJai' primarily grew up in East St. Louis, Illinois and was faced with tragedy when her father killed her mother then the police killed her father in a domestic dispute. Because of this, CeeJai is an outspoken advocate of gun control and tries to have a positive outlook on life. CeeJai' finds herself facing off with Jenna from time to time because of her views about race. In episode 10, CeeJai' gets into a physical altercation with Jenna after they both get riled up from each other. In episode 12, the two get into another altercation after Jenna's friend tells her to "pick cotton" on ooVoo. CeeJai' was sent home early due to her altercations with Jenna.
Chris Ammon Hall	23	Brooklyn, New York
Chris is an atheist considering officially declaring becoming an Ex-Mormon due to the exclusionary views of the Church of Jesus Christ of Latter-day Saints (LDS Church). He recently dropped out of Brigham Young University, moved to the East Coast and settled in Brooklyn to discover himself and shed his upbringing and clean-cut ways. He is the first pansexual cast member in the history of the show. Chris was originally friends with Jenna, but have a falling out after Jenna says that gay sex is disgusting. In episode 5, Chris reveals that he leaked information about what Jenna has said in the Real World house through a friend. In episode 6, Chris heads out to Utah with Kailah to officially resign from the LDS Church. Note: Hall would later change gender identity - Identifying as Non-Binary on The Challenge XXX: Dirty 30 (going by the nickname "Ammo" and competing with male contestants). Currently, Hall identifies as female (going by the name Amo Elizabeth). This page will reflect the male identity of Hall at the time of the filming of this programme.
Dean Bart-Plange	25	Los Angeles, California
Dean is an actor currently going through divorce proceedings with his wife. He is the third cast member in the history of the series to have already been married at the start of his or her season. Dean grew up in Ghana until he was 5 and then moved to Las Vegas before attending the University of Nevada, Reno.
Dione Mariani	24	Cape Cod, Massachusetts
Dione is an unemployed drifter. He previously appeared in the documentary Under the Electric Sky as an attendee of the Electric Daisy Carnival. Dione hooks up with Kailah in the beginning of the season, but then ignores her after he gets his ex, Amanda, mad when he told her. In episode 8, Amanda visits the house, and she later clashes with Kailah.
Jenna Thomason	22	Easley, South Carolina
Jenna is an aspiring singer and self-proclaimed tomboy. Jenna has had a sheltered life with little exposure outside of pro-southern views and past struggles with a broken home. She is Mormon. Jenna has a boyfriend named Austin while being on the show. The roommates feel that he is holding Jenna from having fun. Jenna's views on sexuality and race has put her against the rest of the house. Jenna gets mad at CeeJai' in episode 3, when she makes a stripper have a lap dance on Jenna. In episode 7, she gets yelled at by CeeJai' due to not giving as much of a tip as the other roommates did during a dinner out. When the new roommate, Dylan, arrives, Jenna starts to develop a romance with Dylan even though she is still with Austin. She gets into two physical altercations with CeeJai' in episodes 11 and 12, and is sent home early.
Kailah Casillas	22	Fort Myers, Florida
Kailah is an aspiring journalist with an outspoken personality who graduated from Florida Gulf Coast University in 2014. Although she was popular, Kailah was considered the "mean girl" in high school. Kailah describes herself as a sexual person. In the beginning of the season, she hooks up with Dione after an intense flirtation in episode 2. However, later in the season, Kailah clashes with Dione due to feeling left out of his friend group, which included him, CeeJai', and Dean. In episode 6, Kailah decides to write an article on the LDS Church through Chris's experience.
Sabrina Kennedy	21	Topsfield, Massachusetts
Sabrina is a student at University of Massachusetts Amherst. She is a singer with a sense of humor who hopes to build a fan base through appearing on the show and meet her biological mother sometime in the near future. Sabrina was initially attracted to Dione at the beginning. In episode 8, Sabrina is given the opportunity to write and release a song with Jenna through a mission. In episode 10, their song, "Fly", was released through a Las Vegas radio station and was later released as a free download on MTV.com.
Dylan Moore	24	Charlotte, North Carolina
Dylan is an aspiring entertainer and 2014 graduate of the University of North Carolina at Chapel Hill. During his time at UNC, he had his full scholarship for track and field revoked and was kicked off the team after a stripping prank in a lecture hall during a class using skills from his then-job as a stripper that later went viral online. After graduation, he moved to the Greater Los Angeles Area to pursue his entertainment aspirations and claims to have been a writer's assistant on the sitcom Ground Floor. Dylan joins this season as an additional roommate twist in episode 9. Dylan is attracted to both Kailah and Jenna when he arrives, but he ends up getting close to Jenna.

^1 Age at start of filming

=== Duration of cast ===
Cast member	Episodes											
Cast member	1	2	3	4	5	6	7	8	9	10	11	12
Chris	Featured	Featured	Featured	Featured	Featured	Featured	Featured	Featured	Featured	Featured	Featured	Featured
Dean	Featured	Featured	Featured	Featured	Featured	Featured	Featured	Featured	Featured	Featured	Featured	Featured
Dione	Featured	Featured	Featured	Featured	Featured	Featured	Featured	Featured	Featured	Featured	Featured	Featured
Kailah	Featured	Featured	Featured	Featured	Featured	Featured	Featured	Featured	Featured	Featured	Featured	Featured
Sabrina	Featured	Featured	Featured	Featured	Featured	Featured	Featured	Featured	Featured	Featured	Featured	Featured
Dylan									Entered (Note: Dylan came into the house in Episode 9.)	Featured	Featured	Featured
CeeJai'	Featured	Featured	Featured	Featured	Featured	Featured	Featured	Featured	Featured	Featured	Featured	Removed (Note: CeeJai' was removed from the house in the season finale for causing harm to Jenna during multiple physical altercations.)
Jenna	Featured	Featured	Featured	Featured	Featured	Featured	Featured	Featured	Featured	Featured	Featured	Removed (Note: Jenna was removed the house in the season finale after instigating multiple physical altercations with CeeJai'.)

== Missions ==
Episode	#	Mission	Description	Participant(s)	Result	Notes
1	1	Jump	Bungee jump from a hot air balloon.	CeeJai', Chris, Dean, Dione, Kailah, Jenna, Sabrina	Completed	
2	2	Drag	Dress in drag for a night out.	Chris, Dean, Dione	Completed	
2	3	Find	Call a number that will help you to find your biological mother.	Sabrina	Completed	
3/4	4	Plunge	Participate in blobbing.	CeeJai', Chris, Dean, Dione, Kailah, Sabrina	Completed	Jenna was medically excused from competing due to a neck injury.
5	5	Phobia	Last 60 seconds with poisonous tarantulas on your body.	CeeJai', Chris, Dione, Dean, Kailah, Jenna, Sabrina	Completed	
5	6	Roll	Fly in planes and do aeroacrobatics.	CeeJai', Chris, Dean, Dione, Kailah, Jenna, Sabrina	Completed	
5	7	Truth	Reveal the truth about the internet leaks.	Chris	Completed	Chris' mission was presented in private to him in the Confessional.
6	8	Trek	Trek up a mountain in less than 90 minutes.	CeeJai', Chris, Dean, Dione, Kailah, Jenna, Sabrina	Completed	
7/10	9	Record	Write and produce a song together.	Jenna, Sabrina	Completed	Jenna and Sabrina's song wasn't aired until Episode 10.
7	10	Baller	Create a surprise divorce party for Dean.	CeeJai', Chris, Dione, Kailah, Jenna, Sabrina	Completed	
8	11	Spin	DJ at a nightclub with The Stafford Brothers.	Kailah	Completed	Was edited to not be shown as a mission. CeeJai confirmed it was a mission on Twitter and Spin can be seen on the wall of missions.
9	12	Survive	Survive in a desert for 24 hours	CeeJai', Chris, Dean, Dione, Dylan, Kailah, Jenna, Sabrina	Completed	The cast received a new roommate, Dylan, who was able to become a roommate by completing the mission.
9	13	Flaunt	Perform at a male strip club.	Dean, Dylan	Completed	
12	14	Soar	Soar over the Fremont Street Experience on the SlotZilla zip line	Chris, Dean, Dione, Dylan, Kailah, Sabrina	Completed	CeeJai' and Jenna had both been removed from the house prior to the mission.

Additional missions Fear, Yes, Speed, and Fall also took part but were not aired. Fear required Kailah to be in a cave of bats, Speed involved the cast driving rally trucks, Yes required Chris to say yes to what his roommates asked of him for the day, and Fall required the cast to rappel down a cliff. Fall did not include CeeJai' and Jenna as both had been removed from the show by the time of the mission. Fall can be seen in the season's trailer.

== Episodes ==
No. overall	No. in season	Title	Original release date	U.S. viewers (millions)
579	1	"The Big Leap"	March 17, 2016	0.55
Seven new roommates move to Las Vegas as they learn that they would have to complete missions in order to stay in the house. Dione and Kailah begin flirting with each other, and Sabrina begins to have interest in Dione as well. Jenna's roots to the South begins to surface as she shares her opinions on race to CeeJai' and Dean. CeeJai' shares the story of her parents' death to the other roommates.
580	2	"If The Dress Fits...Wear It"	March 24, 2016	0.50
A mission made only for the guys in the house forces them to dress in drag, which makes Dean uncomfortable. Sabrina begins to search for her biological mother. Dione is caught in a triangle with Kailah and Sabrina, but ends when Dione and Kailah's flirtation heats up.
581	3	"Disaster Down Under"	March 31, 2016	0.48
Kailah gets mad at Jenna when she complains about her hookup with Dione. The roommates go to a strip club to celebrate CeeJai's birthday. When CeeJai' tells one stripper to giver Jenna a lap dance, Jenna gets upset because she doesn't want to get her boyfriend upset. Jenna shares her past of domestic abuse to Chris. While riding on ATVs, Jenna falls off of one, and later has problems with her neck.
582	4	"Unfriended"	April 7, 2016	0.50
As the producers inform the cast that Jenna will be not able to compete in the next mission due to her neck injury, they let them decide whether they want Jenna to stay or not. Dione leads the group that decides that Jenna stays. In the mission two castmembers have to jump on air sack projecting another castmember sitting on the other end of the air sack into the air. Sabrina gets injured while hitting the water but in the end the mission is a success. While driving back to house, Jenna says to Chris in a discussion that thinking about gay sex disgusts her which enrages him. Kailah becomes jealous when Dione meets another girl, Kia, at a party. Even though Dione knows that Kailah is mad at him he still brings Kia to the house and they have sex in the shower. The next day Kailah attacks Dione who informs Kailah that his sex life is not her business. Kailah receives an email from her mother about a leak regarding Jenna on the internet.
583	5	"The Leak"	April 14, 2016	0.45
An anonymous Internet leak impacts Jenna and creates major drama inside and outside the house. Kailah and Chris attack Jenna accusing her of being offensive, while Jenna attacks Kailah believing she is the leaker. Chris reveals in the confessional that it was him because he believes that Jenna represents a tradition of racism and homophobia. Kailah reveals to Chris that after filming she wants to be a journalist and plans writing an article about the Mormon religion and going to Utah to find more information about it as she finds it very interesting. Chris speaks up about his turbulent life with Mormonism. The next day, Chris finds out he has to say the truth about leaking the stuff about Jenna as part of his next mission.
584	6	"Take a Hike"	April 28, 2016	0.47
Kailah feels that Dean, CeeJai', and Dione are becoming a clique and clashes with Dione due to feeling left out. Kailah struggles in the "Trek" mission, but she manages to make it through. In order to pursue her journalism career, Kailah decides to write an article about Mormonism through Chris's experience. Chris makes the most important decision of his life as he resigns from the Mormon religion.
585	7	"The Tipping Point"	May 5, 2016	0.47
CeeJai' rethinks of her parents when the roommates go to a gun range. Jenna shares her opinions on gun control, which angers the rest of the house because they think she was being insensitive to CeeJai. Dean finalizes his divorce and expresses great interest in Kailah when the roommates throw him a divorce party. Jenna and Sabrina start working on a song together. CeeJai' gets angry at Jenna for a low tip after a dinner out.
586	8	"The Carny Queen"	May 12, 2016	0.40
Dione's friends visit the house, including Amanda Please, Dione's ex. Dean is irritated by Jenna because he feels she is putting on an act for the cameras for her boyfriend back home. Jenna feels threatened by him, which angers CeeJai' because she thinks Jenna is saying this because of Dean's race. Kailah feels that Dean is changing when he hangs out with Dione's friends. CeeJai' confronts both Jenna and Kailah about their perception on Dean. Amanda Please and Kailah end up fighting after Kailah calls Amanda "little". Dean breaks down after the confrontation, expressing that he feels that he has to put on an act because of the color of his skin, and CeeJai' comforts him.
587	9	"Shaken and Stirred"	May 12, 2016	0.39
Upon completing the "Survive" mission, a new roommate, Dylan, moves into the house and immediately expresses interest in Jenna, but is also attracted to Kailah. Dylan and a newly divorced Dean are given a mission in which they have to put on a strip show.
588	10	"The Hits Keep Coming"	May 19, 2016	0.37
Dylan and Jenna's relationship continues to develop and she opens up to him about her past abusive relationship. Jenna attempts to break up with her boyfriend, but ends up not doing it and decides to stop her fling with Dylan in order to stay faithful to her boyfriend. Jenna and Sabrina release their song on the radio. Tensions arise between CeeJai' and Jenna.
589	11	"Southern Shame"	May 26, 2016	0.45
Sabrina learns that her biological mother lives in Boston and she is able to meet her for the first time. After ending his fling with Jenna, Dylan begins to pursue Kailah, but she rejects him. While chatting with a friend, Jenna expresses some racist views right in front of Ceejai'.
590	12	"They All Go Home"	May 26, 2016	0.38
CeeJai' gets into a physical altercation with Jenna and they are both sent home. The remaining roommates are given one last mission before leaving Las Vegas. At the end of the episode, the castmates participate in a video conference with a producer to reflect on their experience in Real World.

== After filming ==
Sabrina Kennedy's first EP, Lioness, was released August 21, 2016. In 2019, she released the single "Hold Tight", which was featured on Love Island and The Only Way Is Essex. Her latest single, "The Other Side" was released in late 2020. Kennedy also made her acting debut in the movie Habitual directed by Johnny Hickey, which also featured Chris Tamburello from The Real World: Paris and Emilee Fitzpatrick from The Real World: Cancun.

After their appearance on The Challenge, Ammo talked about being raped by a former partner and suffering PTSD, which caused their collapse after the elimination round against Jordan Wiseley from The Real World: Portland. On December 18, 2018, Ammo released their first single, "Macy". In 2019, Ammo (who now goes by the name "Amo") revealed they started taking hormones for transitioning.

In 2019, Kailah Casillas appeared as an ambassador on MTV's Lindsay Lohan's Beach Club. In the same year, she appeared on How Far Is Tattoo Far? with her then–boyfriend, Mikey P from From G's to Gents. In 2022, Casillas married fellow reality star Sam Bird.

=== The Challenge ===
Cast member	Seasons of The Challenge	Other appearances
CeeJai' Jenkins	—N/a	—N/a
Chris "Ammo" Ammon Hall	XXX: Dirty 30	—N/a
Dean Bart-Plange	—N/a	—N/a
Dione Mariani	—N/a	—N/a
Jenna Thomason	—N/a	—N/a
Kailah Casillas	Invasion of the Champions, XXX: Dirty 30, Vendettas, Final Reckoning, Total Madness, Ride or Dies	The Challenge: Champs vs. Stars (season 2), The Challenge: All Stars (season 3)
Sabrina Kennedy	—N/a	—N/a
Dylan Moore	—N/a	—N/a
