= Real World Seattle: Bad Blood =

Coordinates: 47°36′52.6″N 122°19′02.0″W

- Season 32
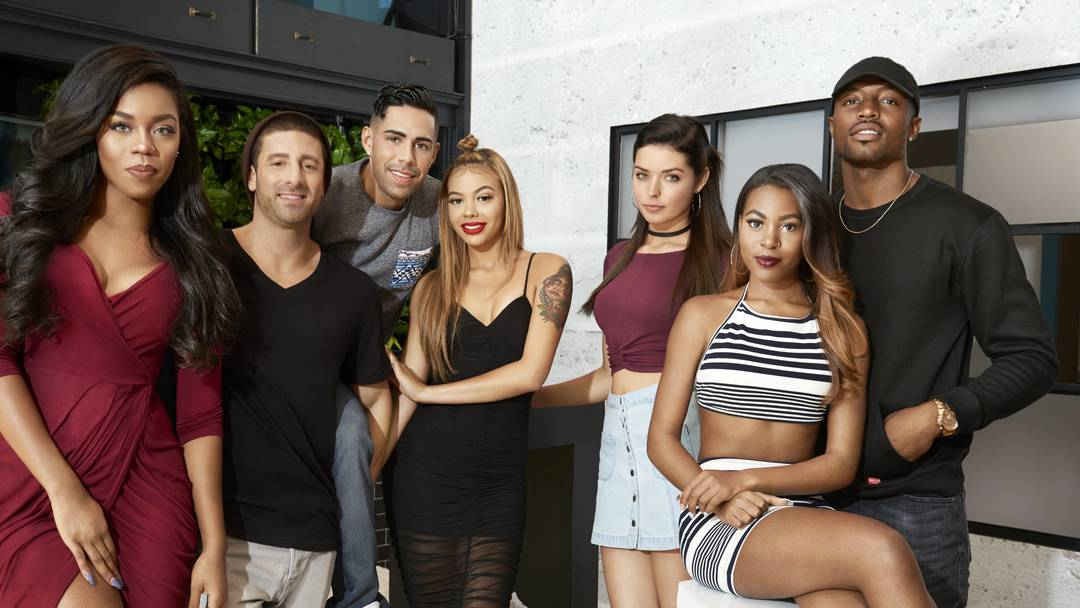
- The initial cast of Real World Seattle: Bad Blood
- Starring: Anika Rashaun; Jordan Anderson; Katrina Stack; Mike Crescenzo; Robbie Padovano; Theo King-Bradley; Tyara Hooks; Anna Stack; Jennifer Geoghan; Kassius Bass; Kimberly Johansson; Orlana Russell; Peter Romeo; Will Groomes III
- No. of episodes: 12

Release
- Original network: MTV
- Original release: October 12, 2016 – January 4, 2017

Season chronology
- ← Previous; Real World: Go Big or Go Home Next → The Real World: Atlanta

Real World Seattle: Bad Blood is the thirty-second season of MTV's reality television series Real World, which focuses on a group of diverse strangers living together for several months in a different city each season as cameras document their lives and interpersonal relationships. It is the ninth season to be filmed in the Pacific States region of the United States, specifically in Washington, and is also the third season to be filmed in the Pacific Northwest after The Real World: Portland.

The season featured a total of fourteen people, consisting of seven original roommates and seven additional permanent roommates who lived in the Capitol Hill neighborhood of Seattle, Washington. This season follows a theme, similar to the past three seasons. It is the tenth season to take place in a city that had hosted a previous season, as the show's seventh season was set in Seattle in 1998. Seattle was first reported as the location for the thirty-second season by the website Vevmo on May 22, 2016. Production began on June 30, and concluded on August 27, 2016 totaling up to 58 days of filming.

The season premiered on October 12 of that year on MTV and the MTV app, and concluded with the season finale on January 4, 2017, consisting of 12 episodes. This is the last season to air on MTV before the show changed to distribution via Facebook Watch through MTV Studios and Bunim/Murray Productions.

== Season changes ==
Most seasons of Real World have a phone room so the cast members can make calls. On this season, the production crew provided the cast members smartphones so they could take their own pictures, have calls, and send text messages to families, one another, and close friends. This is the first time cast have been given personal communication devices since the cast of the tenth season were given two-way pagers and limited cell phones the cast of the Philadelphia season got to use when out of the house.

== Residence ==
During shooting, the cast lived at the Ballou Wright Building located at 1517 12th Avenue between E. Pike Street and E. Pine Street in the Capitol Hill neighborhood.

== Cast ==
This was the first season of Real World to feature fourteen cast members consisting of seven original roommates and seven additional roommates. The season started off with seven roommates, and then the cast was joined by seven additional roommates. The additional roommates are "Bad Blood", people who the originals once got along with but now have a rift with due to various issues. The Bad Blood were told by production they were cast for Road Rules until they arrived for filming.

Initial cast members of Real World Seattle: Bad Blood
Cast member	Age^{1}	Hometown
Anika Rashaun	24	Harlem, New York
Anika is an aspiring television host and Pace University graduate who sees herself as a social outgoing person. Her Bad Blood, Will, is her ex-boyfriend of three years with whom she shares a tumultuous on-and-off relationship and shaky friendship. She resents that Will is good friends with her brother, and that he did not immediately tell her when he got another girl pregnant.
Jordan Anderson	21	Chicago, Illinois
Jordan is a model and part-time hairstylist who sees being on the show as a way for her to be more independent from her parents. Her Bad Blood is her former best friend Orlana. Their relationship turned sour after Orlana's jealousy over a guy, and after Jordan failing to acknowledge Orlana's struggles with depression and thoughts of suicide. She develops a romantic relationship with Mike while filming.
Katrina Stack	23	Micanopy, Florida
Katrina loves to hunt and fish and is looking to be outside her small town. Her bad blood is her sister, Anna. The two both claim to love and support one another, though they share a complicated relationship with issues of jealousy, over-protectiveness, and years of fighting in their past.
Mike Crescenzo	25	Manhattan, New York
Mike is a model and former stripper. His Bad Blood is his former roommate, Peter. Mike has admitted to owing Peter $2000 from living together, and has yet to repay him. In Episode 8, Mike reveals that he has struggled with drugs in the past, ultimately serving 15 days in jail where he claims that he joined the Aryan Brotherhood to avoid getting raped. He develops an attraction to Jordan during filming. Mike chooses to leave the house Episode 8 after saying multiple racial comments and fearing that he'll be seen as a racist. Mike was a cast member of the third season of Are You the One?. He was removed from that show before filming ended after a heated confrontation between him and a female cast member turned physical.
Robbie Padovano	22	Morganville, New Jersey
Robbie is a DJ and party promoter who lives with his parents. Besides summer camp, he hasn't been away from home for more than a week. His Bad Blood is his ex-girlfriend Jennifer, whom he broke up with because he felt too young to be in a serious relationship.
Theo King-Bradley	23	Kankakee, Illinois
Theo is a former college football player for Eastern Illinois University. His Bad Blood is his cousin Kassius. They shared a close relationship until a police incident where they were caught with marijuana in their dorm room they shared, and Theo took the heat for the situation. He lost his position as a result. He describes the incident as the single event that changed the course of his life, and blames Kassius for losing his opportunity to potentially play in the NFL. He was removed in Episode 9 after a physical altercation with his cousin Kassius.
Tyara Hooks	21	Alpharetta, Georgia
Tyara is a Western Kentucky University student who spent part of her time growing up as a military brat. She grew up in England, and moved back to Georgia during high school. During high school, Tyara has dealt with bullying from other students, especially her Bad Blood, Kimberly, who she claims online bullied her for years and accused her English accent of being fake. She sees the show as a way to challenge herself to make new friends, something she struggles with as a result of mistrust due to bullying. In Episode 10, Tyara finds out that she is seven weeks pregnant with an ex from back home. In Episode 11, she decides to leave the house to deal with the pregnancy.

Bad Blood
Cast member	Age^{1}	Hometown
Anna Stack	25	Orlando, Florida
Katrina's older sister. Katrina and Anna love one another but struggle to communicate, disagree about aspects of their upbringing and past behavior towards one another, and constantly get in arguments that lead to hurt feelings and verbal attacks.
Jennifer Geoghan	24	Hoboken, New Jersey
Robbie's ex-girlfriend. She is a hairstylist who feels Robbie did not give her proper closure in their past relationship and do not have a friendship. She reveals she later had an abusive boyfriend. She and Anna get into a heated altercation, which ends up in Anna pushing Jennifer, and Jennifer pushing Anna to the floor, leading to Katrina to jump in and defend Anna.
Kassius Bass	21	Charleston, Illinois
Theo's cousin and ex-roommate. He is a father and his child lives with Kassius's mother. Theo feels Kassius is responsible for his getting kicked off his college football team due to marijuana found in their shared room. He and his bad blood Theo get in a physical altercation during the show, which leads to Theo being kicked off the show.
Kimberly Johansson	23	Atlanta, Georgia
Tyara's former high school classmate. Kimberly started rumors about Tyara in high school.
Orlana Russell	21	Ypsilanti, Michigan
Jordan's former best friend. In episode 5, Orlana reveals that she has had a past with suicidal thoughts and depression, and she felt that Jordan did not care for it.
Peter Romeo	24	Deerfield Beach, Florida
Mike's former roommate. Peter is a bartender. He won $500,000 on the 2014 one-time MTV game show special Million Dollar Maze Runner. The special was produced by Bunim/Murray Productions on behalf of 20th Century Fox to promote the movie The Maze Runner. He was removed from the house in the season finale after being physical and threatening towards numerous people in the house.
Will Groomes III	24	Philadelphia, Pennsylvania
Anika's ex-boyfriend. He has a child with a different girl.

^1 Age at start of filming

=== Duration of cast ===
Cast member	Episodes											
Cast member	1	2	3	4	5	6	7	8	9	10	11	12
Anika	Featured	Featured	Featured	Featured	Featured	Featured	Featured	Featured	Featured	Featured	Featured	Featured
Jordan	Featured	Featured	Featured	Featured	Featured	Featured	Featured	Featured	Featured	Featured	Featured	Featured
Katrina	Featured	Featured	Featured	Featured	Featured	Featured	Featured	Featured	Featured	Featured	Featured	Featured
Robbie	Featured	Featured	Featured	Featured	Featured	Featured	Featured	Featured	Featured	Featured	Featured	Featured
Anna			Entered (Note: The “Bad Blood” (Anna, Jennifer, Kassius, Kimberly, Orlana, Peter and Will) were introduced in Episode 3, but officially entered the house in Episode 4.)	Entered	Featured	Featured	Featured	Featured	Featured	Featured	Featured	Featured
Jennifer			Entered	Entered	Featured	Featured	Featured	Featured	Featured	Featured	Featured	Featured
Kassius			Entered	Entered	Featured	Featured	Featured	Featured	Featured	Featured	Featured	Featured
Kimberly			Entered	Entered	Featured	Featured	Featured	Featured	Featured	Featured	Featured	Featured
Orlana			Entered	Entered	Featured	Featured	Featured	Featured	Featured	Featured	Featured	Featured
Will			Entered	Entered	Featured	Featured	Featured	Featured	Featured	Featured	Featured	Featured
Peter			Entered	Entered	Featured	Featured	Featured	Featured	Featured	Featured	Featured	removed (Note: Peter was removed from the house in the season finale after instigating a physical altercation between Jennifer and Anna & Katrina, verbally abusing Anna, and being physical towards Jennifer and the production crew.)
Tyara	Featured	Featured	Featured	Featured	Featured	Featured	Featured	Featured	Featured	Featured	Left (Note: Tyara voluntarily left the house in Episode 11 after finding out she was pregnant.)	
Theo	Featured	Featured	Featured	Featured	Featured	Featured	Featured	Featured	removed (Note: Theo was removed from the house in Episode 9 after a physical altercation with Kassius.)			
Mike	Featured	Featured	Featured	Featured	Featured	Featured	Featured	Left (Note: Mike voluntarily left the house in Episode 8 after saying multiple racial comments.)				

== Episodes ==
No. overall	No. in season	Title	Original release date	U.S. viewers (millions)
591	1	"A Bloody Good Start"	October 12, 2016	0.40
Seven brand new roommates move into their new house in Seattle. As the roommates get to know each other, Tyara feels left out, and is not opening up. However, she develops a small crush on Theo. Mike feels a strong attraction to Jordan, but the feeling seems to be non-mutual. Katrina explains her relationship with her sister to Mike. The roommates play a "Truth or Dare"-like game that involves Robbie having to bite Theo's lip. After, Tyara gets mad after Jordan and Theo talk about her in the Confessional, while she is in there sleeping, and tensions fly high between Mike and Robbie.
592	2	"Game Enough?"	October 12, 2016	0.33
Robbie is sent to a hotel after an intense confrontation with Mike. Theo discusses his broken relationship with his cousin to Tyara. When the roommates celebrate the 4th of July, Tyara continues to isolate herself from the rest of the house and, when Theo dances with a girl on a night out, she gets extremely jealous, making their friendship awkward. Katrina fights with Anna via text, and she fears that she and her sister may not be able to fix their relationship. Tyara explains to Theo that she is very isolated because of her past with being bullied in high school. Theo then reveals that he has a crush on Tyara. Anna, and presumably all the other Bad Blood, gets a message from producers saying that they are cast for a new season of Road Rules, and will be heading to Portland, Oregon in 10 days.
593	3	"Not The Show You Think It Is"	October 19, 2016	0.33
Anna fears that the show may create an even bigger strain in her relationship with Katrina. Peter reveals that he and Mike had a falling out because Mike owes him money. Kimberly, Tyara's Bad Blood, reveals that Tyara's British accent is fake. Will explains her relationship with Anika, and Anika reveals that she has trust issues with guys because of Will. Back in Seattle, Robbie learns that Jennifer is two hours away, and he fears that she may be moving into the house. Tyara explains that Kimberly bullied her in high school, which is why she hates Kimberly. Theo promises to himself that he will keep his cool if Kassius comes to the house. Orlana fears that her relationship with Jordan may not be solved when she moves in. Jennifer reveals that she is insecure because of Robbie. Peter and Anna begin flirting with each other.
594	4	"Sleep Mess in Seattle"	October 26, 2016	0.33
The originals prepare for the twist that they suspect will be happening soon. Theo reveals that he lost a Division 1 scholarship because of a police incident caused by his cousin having marijuana in their dorm. The roommates head to the club for a night out. All of the roommates, except Tyara, this upsets her as she feels excluded. Back at the house, Tyara confronts all of her roommates, but they feel she is exaggerating the situation and Theo gets upset the two of them were becoming close. The Bad Blood finally move into the house. Anika reveals that she and Will were in an off-and-on relationship for three years. However, she would still see him after they broke up because Will was close to her brother. Then, Will got another girl pregnant, and he didn't tell Anika, while her brother knew. Anna tells Katrina that Tyara's accent is fake. Mike confronts Kassius on calling Theo's side of the story fake. Peter says Mike is known to be an instigator. Theo steps in, and Peter intervenes. Tyara steps in as well and Peter calls her out on her fake accent.
595	5	"Fourteen's A Crowd"	November 2, 2016	0.30
Mike and Peter explain their situation and Peter is still angry that Mike did not pay him back. Peter gets to know Katrina after taking a liking in Anna. Katrina explains that her and Anna are very competitive towards each other. Peter fears that he may be the reason for future trouble between the sisters. Kassius checks up on his son, and he questions whether being in the house is the right thing to do. Tyara tries to comfort Kassius, but this confuses Theo when he finds them talking. Mike has a fight with Anna, and Katrina comes to her defense. Mike thinks Katrina is choosing sides because she is defending her sister. The next morning, Anika and Will discuss their relationship, and try to compromise a way to live in the house together. Later that night, the girls and guys go on their own nights out. The girls all bond, but Orlana is still hesitant to talk to Jordan. Peter, Anna, and Katrina go out on their own, but Peter is getting bad vibes from Katrina. The next day, Peter and Anna talk about it, and he agrees to give Katrina a chance.
596	6	"Stacked Odds"	November 9, 2016	0.34
Orlana tells Jordan how she feels about their friendship and both agree to move on. Katrina is not happy about Anna and Peter's relationship. Anna wants to rekindle her relationship with Katrina and agrees to spend less time with Peter, but he quickly moves on and reveals Jennifer he likes her.
597	7	"Petered Out"	November 16, 2016	0.32
Jennifer breaks up with her current boyfriend for Peter, they have their first date and sleep together for the night. Tyara wants to move out of the room she shares with Theo and he gets frustrated about it.
598	8	"Drop the Mike"	November 30, 2016	0.40
During a night out, Mike starts saying racist comments and decides to leave the house to avoid backlash. Theo tries to convince him to stay, but Jordan and Orlana feel very offended. The remaining roommates attend a Black Lives Matter protest.
599	9	"Blood Cousins"	December 7, 2016	0.35
Robbie tells Katrina she is acting different since her sister moved in. Theo and Kassius have another discussion about Theo's lost scholarship. The fight escalates and Theo is sent home for getting physical.
600	10	"Surprise!"	December 14, 2016	0.34
Jennifer throws a costume party for Peter's birthday and the two make their relationship official. Katrina and Anna talk to a counselor about their relationship. Tyara and Kimberly talk about their high school drama and finally decide to move on. Tyara takes a pregnancy test and it turns out positive.
601	11	"For the Love of Pete"	December 28, 2016	0.35
Tyara leaves the house. Peter gets more and more controlling over Jennifer and does not want her and Anna to be friends. Anna googles "domestic verbal abuse" on the house computer and leaves it on display, then Robbie tells Peter and Jennifer about the search.
602	12	"Bad Blood No More"	January 4, 2017	0.34
After a night out, Peter, Jennifer, Katrina and Anna have a fight. Peter is sent home for it and he wants Jennifer to leave with him, but in the end she chooses to stay. Anika and Will have a conversation about their past before leaving Seattle.

== After filming ==
Peter and Jennifer moved in together right after the show, but reportedly called it quits in September 2017.

Anika Rashaun moved to Los Angeles and launched a life coaching website. Rashaun passed away in October 2026 due to breast cancer.

=== The Challenge ===
Cast member	Seasons of The Challenge
Anika Rashaun	Invasion of the Champions
Jordan Anderson	—N/a
Katrina Stack	—N/a
Mike Crescenzo	—N/a
Robbie Padovano	—N/a
Theo King-Bradley	Invasion of the Champions
Tyara Hooks	—N/a
Anna Stack	—N/a
Jennifer Geoghan	—N/a
Kassius Bass	—N/a
Kimberly Johansson	—N/a
Orlana Russell	—N/a
Peter Romeo	—N/a
Will Groomes III	—N/a
