= The Real World: St. Thomas =

Coordinates: 18°20′3″N 64°56′6″W

- Season 27
- The cast of The Real World: St. Thomas
- Starring: Brandon Kane; Brandon Swift; LaToya Jackson; Laura Waller; Marie Roda; Robb Schreiber; Trey Weatherholtz
- No. of episodes: 12

Release
- Original network: MTV
- Original release: June 27 – September 12, 2012

Season chronology
- ← Previous; The Real World: San Diego Next → The Real World: Portland

The Real World: St. Thomas is the twenty-seventh season of MTV's reality television series The Real World, which focuses on a group of diverse strangers living together for several months in a different city each season, as cameras follow their lives and interpersonal relationships. It is the only season of The Real World to be filmed in the Caribbean, and the second season set in the United States to be filmed outside of the contiguous United States after The Real World: Hawaii.

The season featured a cast of seven people who lived in a house on Hassel Island. St. Thomas and Hassel Island in the U.S. Virgin Islands were first reported as the location for the 27th season in a February 2012 article on the website St. Thomas Blog. Production started from March to May 2012, and the season premiered on June 27 of that year, consisting of 12 episodes.

== Assignment ==
Most seasons of The Real World, beginning with its fifth season, have included the assignment of a season-long group job or task to the housemates, continued participation in which has been mandatory to remain part of the cast since the Back to New York season. The cast worked at Coral World Ocean Park for their season assignment.

== Residence ==
The cast lived on Hassel Island, almost all of which is property of the Virgin Islands National Park, with a small area owned by the Virgin Islands Port Authority, and a few private residences. The season residence was located on an isolated estate consisting of three houses totaling approximately 15,000 square feet, a quarter mile across the bay from Charlotte Amalie, St. Thomas, the capital and largest city of the US Virgin Islands. The property was purchased by a local businessman in 2007 and extensively renovated in early 2010 by local architect Kevin Qualls. Its sales listing prior to filming indicates that it houses three master suites with unobstructed views of Charlotte Amalie harbor, an open terrace bordering the living room 100 feet from the harbor and a swimming pool that includes a natural cascade from ancient rock outcroppings. The property also includes two 1,200 square foot West Indian-inspired guest cottages North and South of the main building, a front lawn facing the harbor that can hold up to 225 guests and a new dock and helipad. The cast had access to motor boats that would take them back and forth from Hassel Island to Charlotte Amalie.

== Cast ==
Cast member	Age^{1}	Hometown
Brandon Kane	22	Quincy, Massachusetts
Brandon, who goes by the nickname "Hollywood", does construction in the Boston area. He, his brother, and their younger sister grew up in public housing, and dislikes his job at Forever 21. He reveals he has been sober for six months, having previously been addicted to alcohol and heroin. Heavily tattooed and pierced, the fact that he is not athletic like the other male housemates leads to feelings of exclusion on his part, as does the fact that Laura does not reciprocate his attraction to her, as she is more interested in Trey. He claims to have always had a bad temper, and in Episode 5, Swift becomes concerned over his behavior when drinking. Despite his struggle to remain sober while in St. Thomas, he begins drinking again in Episode 10, and in Episode 11, he fails a drug test and as a result, is evicted from filming and sent home.
Brandon Swift	22	Edison, New Jersey
Brandon, who goes by his last name "Swift," graduated from Temple University with a Business Administration degree in legal studies. His mother is a lawyer and his father is a graduate of Rochester Institute of Technology, and he describes his graduation as one of the greatest moments of his life. In the season premiere he develops an attraction to LaToya, though later in the season.
LaToya Jackson	22	Petersburg, Virginia
LaToya graduated in 2011 from Virginia State University, where she was a Mass Communication/TV/Radio major. She works as a production assistant at a local news station. She describes herself as a continuously "fun and energetic" person. She is single and hopes to socialize during the season.
Laura Waller	22	Omaha, Nebraska
Laura was adopted, and hopes to find her parents one day, having just acquired six months ago letters that they wrote to her the day after her birth explaining that they could not afford to raise both her and sister, who was 19 months old at the time. Laura attended college at University of Nebraska at Omaha. Laura, who was an "ugly duckling" until her high school junior year, describes herself as a "huge flirt". She broke up with her boyfriend prior to filming because she felt maintaining the relationship during a three-month separation was not feasible. Brandon and Robb both find her remarkably attractive in the premiere, though it is Trey with whom Laura shares romantic relationship during the season, one that is marked by conflict over Trey's relationship with a woman named Chelsea back home, who comes to visit the house in Episode 11.
Marie Roda	23	Staten Island, New York
Marie played soccer in high school, and attended the State University of New York at Albany. She says that others perceive her as being a "wild child", but prefers to be characterized as "spontaneous". She is a fan of the New York Giants and New York Yankees. She lives with her parents and younger sister, Kristie. She considers LaToya her best friend in the house, and immediately develops a mutual attraction with Robb, though they suffer conflict during the season over their commitment to one another and the way she regards him, for which Marie is criticized by both Swift and LaToya.
Robb Schreiber	21	Bensalem, Pennsylvania
Robb majored in Electronic Media at Kutztown University of Pennsylvania At 6' 6", he is an avid basketball player, and jokes that as a redhead in a predominantly African American league, he exploits low expectations about his dunking ability by surprising spectators to the contrary. He was inspired to audition for this season by watching The Real World: San Diego (2011). He finds both Laura and Marie attractive when he meets them, though he gravitates toward Marie.
Walter "Trey" Weatherholtz III	22	Baltimore, Maryland
The 5'10" Trey played wide receiver on his high school football team, and graduated in 2010 from Frostburg State University. His stay in the U.S. Virgin Islands is his first time outside of the mainland United States. He broke up with his girlfriend, Chelsea, in order to be single while filming, though he remains friends with her, and speaks with her over the phone during the course of the season. He ultimately resolves to commit to Chelsea and sever all romantic aspects of his relationship with Laura in Episode 11, when Chelsea visits.

^1 Age at time of filming

=== Duration of cast ===
Cast members	Episodes											
Cast members	1	2	3	4	5	6	7	8	9	10	11	12
Brandon S.	Featured	Featured	Featured	Featured	Featured	Featured	Featured	Featured	Featured	Featured	Featured	Featured
LaToya	Featured	Featured	Featured	Featured	Featured	Featured	Featured	Featured	Featured	Featured	Featured	Featured
Laura	Featured	Featured	Featured	Featured	Featured	Featured	Featured	Featured	Featured	Featured	Featured	Featured
Marie	Featured	Featured	Featured	Featured	Featured	Featured	Featured	Featured	Featured	Featured	Featured	Featured
Robb	Featured	Featured	Featured	Featured	Featured	Featured	Featured	Featured	Featured	Featured	Featured	Featured
Trey	Featured	Featured	Featured	Featured	Featured	Featured	Featured	Featured	Featured	Featured	Featured	Featured
Brandon K.	Featured	Featured	Featured	Featured	Featured	Featured	Featured	Featured	Featured	Featured	removed	

== Episodes ==
No. overall	No. in season	Title	Original release date	Viewers (millions)
530	1	"Paradise Found"	June 27, 2012	1.20
The housemates move into the Hassel Island house. Robb and Marie gravitate toward one another, while Laura expresses an attraction to Trey, much to the jealousy of Brandon, who feels like an outsider in the group. Brandon and Trey attempt to resolve this by talking about it, but when the others find his journal, they become alarmed at the suicidal tone of its contents.
531	2	"99 Problems But the Beach Ain't One"	July 4, 2012	0.86
Laura and Trey's attraction escalates, but both have second thoughts about taking things further. Brandon's dance with a woman named Alyssa leads to a confrontation with another man, and when he later encounters her again during a birthday outing for Swift, the men advise caution for him, but he dismisses their concerns. Marie and Robb's attraction also continues, though they both continue to socialize with others. Trey and Robb play dress-up for some hi-jinks.
532	3	"Roommates Become Bedmates"	July 11, 2012	0.88
Trey struggles between his long-distance relationship with Chelsea back home, and his attraction with Laura, with whom he eventually has sex. Similarly conflicted are Marie and Robb, who alternate between expressing their mutual attraction and socializing with others. Meanwhile, Swift and LaToya, despite enjoying each other's company, affirm not to break their rule against romance with fellow housemates.
533	4	"To Pee or Not to Pee"	July 18, 2012	1.13
When Marie finds a dead fish that washed up onto the beach, she uses it to play a prank on the men, which leads to retaliation, an injury that lands Swift in the hospital, a heated conflict between him and LaToya, and Marie's attempts to misdirect suspicion away from her as the prankster.
534	5	"Clean Break"	July 25, 2012	1.16
Swift becomes concerned over how Brandon's temper is triggered by his problems with women and his drinking. LaToya finds herself attracted to a new boat captain. Trey's displeasure over the roommates' lack of cleanliness within the house leads to conflict with the others. The roommates start their jobs at Coral World Ocean Park, during which LaToya has a difficult experience that Swift sees as a karmic comeuppance.
535	6	"Smells Like Green Spirits"	August 1, 2012	1.01
Reflecting upon his six months of sobriety from drugs, Brandon decides to give up alcohol as well, but as the housemates celebrate Saint Patrick's Day with a trip to Saint Croix, he struggles to remain sober. Robb and Trey's relationships with Marie and Laura, respectively, are complicated by the men's relationships with women back home, as well as by the women's association with other men locally.
536	7	"No Shirt, Boat Shoes, No Sanity"	August 8, 2012	0.94
Marie and LaToya believe that Laura is overly dependent upon Trey, who does not treat her with respect, but a drunken Trey is angered when Laura flirts with other men, despite his prior nonchalance about it. As the others weigh in on the matter, Swift gets into a heated argument with Marie over the derogatory manner in which she addresses him. Eventually, all four make amends. On a similar note, Robb and Marie's relationship is tested when she is troubled by his inviting Emily to come for a visit.
537	8	"Hurts So Good"	August 15, 2012	1.23
Trey is still conflicted between a relationship with Laura and another girl, Chelsea, at home, the latter of whom he gets into a verbal fight with during a phone conversation. Laura defeats Marie in a drinking competition. Marie gravitates toward another man, which results in Robb engaging in acts of self-harm, prompting Brandon to attempt to intervene.
538	9	"Who Done It?"	August 22, 2012	1.11
Brandon, Swift and Trey stage an intervention with Robb in order to address his self-harm. Swift chafes against rumors and jokes that he is gay, telling his housemates that he claimed to have been intimate with LaToya in order to squelch these ideas. His conflict with Marie also continues, causing him stress that he attempts to address by going to church.
539	10	"Of Vice and Men"	August 29, 2012	1.09
Marie's beau, Max, visits the house, where his flirtation with LaToya creates conflict with Marie. Brandon invites a girl, Kyndra, back to the house, which leads to pressure on Brandon's part to drink again, much to the concern of the others.
540	11	"Should I Stay or Should I Blow?"	September 5, 2012	1.06
Trey invites Chelsea to St. Thomas in order to make amends with her, and in so doing, resolves that his romance with Laura is over. LaToya and Marie go hiking. Brandon fails one of the random drug tests to which the cast is subject as a condition of filming, and after admitting that he used cocaine one night in a bathroom with a woman, he is forced to leave the island. The cast celebrates his last night on the island, during which Chelsea meets Laura and the rest of the cast.
541	12	"Flyin' the Coop"	September 12, 2012	0.99
The cast enjoys their last days in St. Thomas during Carnival. Swift intends to "go out with a bang" with a prank on Marie and LaToya involving live chickens. On the cast's last day, Swift, who has chosen to remain in St. Thomas, disembarks first. The rest of the cast later exchanges good-byes at the airport, including best friends Marie and LaToya, and Trey and Laura. Trey resolves to make things work with Chelsea, while Laura laments the relationship that could have been between her and Trey.

== After filming ==
The Real World: St. Thomas Reunion aired on September 12, 2012, following the season finale. Maria Menounos hosted, and featured the entire cast, as they discussed their time during filming and their lives since the show ended.

Since filming ended, Laura returned to Nebraska, where she enjoys fishing with her cousin, while LaToya returned to Virginia, and stated that she kept in touch with her boyfriend while living in St. Thomas, and enjoys driving her Ford Mustang. Robb returned to Pennsylvania, where he plans to take online classes for a business degree. Marie returned to Staten Island, where she is undecided about her future plans, while Swift keeps busy with magazine photo shoots, and though he originally pursued interest in sports medicine, he is now pursuing a law degree. Trey returned to Baltimore, where he engages in public and motivational speaking activities at local high schools and colleges, and plays flag football for fun. Brandon returned to Massachusetts, where he fluctuates between sleeping at friends' houses and staying with his dad, as well as continuing electrical work and booking appearances. Laura, Marie, Robb and Trey each participated in The Challenge: Battle of the Seasons in Bodrum, Turkey, after filming ended.

Among the topics discussed was the bitter breakup involving Marie and Robb over a text message and a lack of communication on Robb's part, as well as Marie's drunken behavior and her reputation as a "bad bitch." The complicated relationship between Trey and Laura was also discussed, including Trey's revelation that he failed to re-establish his relationship with Chelsea after filming ended. Tensions erupted when Marie's mean-spirited behavior with fellow housemates and Trey's treatment of Laura were discussed, including LaToya getting physical with Swift. Brandon discussed his struggle with substance abuse, sobriety and the failed drug test that resulted in his eviction from the house, and Menounos questioned his attitude regarding his lifestyle and sobriety. Some of the pranks and antics were also discussed.

On November 1, 2012, Brandon Swift was arrested and charged with disorderly conduct.

In 2016, Laura Waller gave birth to her daughter, Aveya Rian Waller. Her second daughter was born in July 2019.

Marie Roda appeared on the third season of Ex on the Beach. In 2023, Roda gave birth to daughter Margot.

=== The Challenge ===
Cast member	Seasons of The Challenge
Brandon Kane	—N/a
Brandon Swift	Free Agents
LaToya Jackson	Free Agents, Invasion of the Champions, XXX: Dirty 30
Laura Waller	Battle of the Seasons (2012)
Marie Roda	Battle of the Seasons (2012), Invasion of the Champions, XXX: Dirty 30, Vendettas, Final Reckoning
Robb Schreiber	Battle of the Seasons (2012), Rivals II
Walter "Trey" Weatherholtz III	Battle of the Seasons (2012), Rivals II
