= The Real World: Denver =

Season of television series

Coordinates: 39°45′10″N 104°59′38″W

- Season 18
- The cast of The Real World: Denver
- Starring: Brooke LaBarbera; Tyrie Ballard; Colie Edison; Davis Mallory; Stephen Nichols; Jenn Grijalva; Alex Smith
- No. of episodes: 28

Release
- Original network: MTV
- Original release: November 22, 2006 – May 16, 2007

Season chronology
- ← Previous; The Real World: Key West Next → The Real World: Sydney

The Real World: Denver is the eighteenth season of MTV's reality television series The Real World, which focuses on a group of diverse strangers living together for several months in a different city each season, as cameras follow their lives and interpersonal relationships. It is the second season to be filmed in the Mountain States region of the United States, specifically in Colorado.

The season featured seven people who lived in a two-story building in the Lower Downtown area of Denver, Colorado, and its production took place from late May to September 2006. It premiered on November 22 of that year and consisted of 28 episodes, which along with the twelfth season, is the highest number to date. The season premiere was watched by 4.3 million viewers.

== Assignment ==
Almost every season of The Real World, beginning with its fifth season, has included the assignment of a season-long group job or task to the housemates, continued participation in which has been mandatory to remain part of the cast since the Back to New York season. The Denver cast worked for Outward Bound. They were trained on wilderness courses and later guided New Orleans teenagers displaced by Hurricane Katrina in hiking treks.

== The residence ==
The 21,927-square-foot (2,037.1 m^{2}), two-story building is located in Lower Downtown (LoDo) Denver, a historic district and mixed-use neighborhood. Constructed in 1963, the building was sold in late April for $2.7 million to 1920 Market Street, LLC, a holding company that included the producers of the series. The Denver LoDo building was the first property in the 18 seasons of The Real World that Bunim-Murray Productions purchased for the filming of the series. Bunim-Murray had to seek permission from the city to temporarily rezone it from its commercial status to residential. The purchase of the building included extensive renovations. On December 1, 2006, the building was sold for $3.3 million to Steve and Shane Alexander, partners in The Alexander Group, LLC. The sale included all of the furnishings that were used for the filming of the series, except for the artwork, which had been on loan.

== Cast ==
Cast member	Age^{1}	Hometown
Alex Smith	22	Houston, Texas
MTV.com describes Alex as cocky, street smart, and sensitive, with an overconfident loud mouth. He is a Division I swimmer at Arizona State University, has multiple paramours, is close to his family, and is constantly partying, but hopes to grow into a mature man. In the beginning of the season, he is caught in a love triangle between his roommates Colie and Jenn, the latter whom he has sex with in the season premiere.
Brooke LaBarbera	24	Nashville, Tennessee
Brooke is a southern woman raised by two clinical psychologists and recent graduate of Belmont University. Though she grew up in a sheltered environment, she admits to being a very sexual person. She ended a long-term interracial relationship just prior to joining the cast, and harbors dreams of stardom. In episode 16, during the cast's planning of a day trip, Brooke and Jenn have an argument in which Jenn calls Brooke a "whore". As a result, Brooke, who concedes to having a temper, is enraged, screaming at Jenn and storming out, a scene that was named #5 on the 2007 VH1 program 40 Greatest Reality TV Moments 2.
Colie Edison	22	East Brunswick, New Jersey
Colie is a disciplined, principled sorority president from Tulane University in New Orleans where she was part of the first class to graduate after Hurricane Katrina. MTV.com describes as the strongest personality in the house. She is described as having a need for attention, especially from men, and a free spirit. She states she's "not that good at baseball, but I'm good at kissing." when it comes to describing her sexual endeavors. She is in an open relationship with her ex-boyfriend, Corey.
Davis Mallory	23	Marietta, Georgia
MTV.com describes Davis as a typical blonde-haired, blue-eyed frat boy. Despite his southern conservative Christian upbringing, he is gay, something he first realized in the sixth grade, though his family was not pleased with his coming out. Being on The Real World represents a major change in his life, as he has long been afraid to show his true self to the world. In episode 4, Davis and Tyrie have a heated argument that nearly comes to blows, and requires the physical intervention of producers. An emotional Davis then phones his family, telling them, "I'm going home tomorrow because some nigger wants to kill me!" Davis later apologizes to Tyrie for this, and the two make amends. The incident was cited on VH1's 40 Greatest Reality TV Moments 2. He has a boyfriend named P.J.
Jenn Grijalva	22	Martinez, California
Jennifer was a popular girl in school, an Oakland Raiderette cheerleader, and, as mtv.com describes her, a party animal. However, she yearns for emotional attachment, which stems from her inability to allow herself to be vulnerable. In the season premiere, despite becoming close friends with her roommate, Colie, who had been showing interest in Alex, she drunkenly has sex with Alex, much to Colie's displeasure.
Stephen Nichols	22	Sacramento, California
Stephen is a deeply religious Black conservative Republican student at Howard University. He is very ambitious, and outspoken in his views, including his stance against gay marriage. His opposition to homosexuality causes tension between him and his gay roommate, Davis. He is also described as an expert persuader and salesperson who loves to be the center of attention. He has a girlfriend named Mercii.
Tyrie Ballard	23	Omaha, Nebraska
Tyrie was raised in a strict and aggressive manner by a military father. As a consequence, he never developed a strong rapport with him, and ended up with a gang, but is trying to leave that past behind him. He has developed a reputation on his campus for his sharp wit, his interest in politics, and for having a big heart.

^Note 1: Age at time of filming.

== Episodes ==
No. overall	No. in season	Title	Original release date
389	1	"3-Way Premiere"	November 22, 2006
The seven roommates arrive at their Denver home. The roommates are surprised that there are no gay roommates, however, nobody is aware of Davis' sexuality. Stephen and Davis bond over their religious views. Davis confides in Colie about his sexuality, and she easily accepts it. When Tyrie sees Jenn and Brooke make out in the hot tub, he tries to join in, but they rebuff his advances. Colie and Jenn bond over their mutual love of partying.
390	2	"Heating Things Up"	November 22, 2006
Colie tells the girls that she is interested in Alex. Davis comes out about his sexuality to the house, but Stephen does not accept the fact that Davis is both a Christian and homosexual. Alex makes out with Colie, but is afraid Colie is becoming too emotional attached. A drunken Alex and Jenn later have sex.
391	3	"The Morning After"	November 29, 2006
Jenn tries to avoid Colie, but Colie soon learns what happened. They make amends and decide that their friendship is more important than a man. After a girl's night out, Colie brings home a guy, Nick, whom she starts making out with in front of Alex. After Nick leaves, she goes to Alex, and they make a pact that they won't sleep with other people for the next 24 hours. However, because Alex is drunk, he says the next morning that he did not remember agreeing to this.
392	4	"Davis vs Tyrie"	December 6, 2006
Tension arises between Davis, Stephen and Tyrie following a bartender's address of Stephen with a racial slur, leading to a heated confrontation in which Tyrie physically threatens Davis. Davis subsequently states his intention to leave Denver, and furthers the conflict after he refers to Tyrie as a "nigger" when explaining the incident over the phone to his boyfriend. After Davis spends a night in a hotel on the advice of the producers, he apologizes to Stephen and Tyrie, who accept his apology. He decides to remain in Denver, but admits he may be an alcoholic. This conflict was later cited on VH1's 40 Greatest Reality TV Moments 2.
393	5	"Dark Kent"	December 13, 2006
After a night at the bar, Tyrie finds himself trying to balance two different women, Ashley and Jazalle. When he agrees to meet both of them at the same bar, on the same night, Stephen helps him by stalling Ashley, while Tyrie socializes with Jazalle. Davis, Alex and Stephen bond while on a ski trip. To celebrate the passing of June 6, 2006, the housemates (except Stephen, who abstains due to his religious views) attend a bar's "sin party", where Jenn, Brooke and Davis dress up in lingerie and costumes, but soon find out they're the only ones there who are dressed up. A man at the bar questions Davis' sexuality, but Tyrie stands up for him. Leaving the bar, Tyrie sees Jazalle and brings her home.
394	6	"Bus Brawl"	December 20, 2006
Jenn tells Tyrie that he reminds her of her ex-boyfriend, whom she dislikes. Jenn, Tyrie, Alex, Davis and Stephen ride a party bus, and by the time they pick up the rest of the roommates, Jenn is already intoxicated, leading to an argument between her and Tyrie, and Jenn's leaving the group. When the housemates later tell her that they believe she has a drinking problem, Jenn, who parties at least four times a week, reveals that alcoholism runs in her family, and that she consumes at least one alcoholic beverage per day. After her problem continues following this, she apologizes to Tyrie about the incident, and tells Davis she wants a fresh start.
395	7	"The Kissing Disease"	December 27, 2006
Colie become ill and is diagnosed with mononucleosis, which she learns she contracted from kissing multiple people. Brooke gets lost while looking for a nail salon, and suffers rude comments from men. When she relates her experience back at the house, Tyrie takes offense to her characterization of the neighborhood she walked through as a "ghetto". Brooke herself becomes upset when later relating her experience to her mother over the phone, and tells Jenn that she suffers from severe anxiety attacks, but thinks her attacks would be ameliorated if she formed a stronger rapport with her housemates. Brooke and Tyrie later make amends.
396	8	"Crossing the Line"	January 3, 2007
The roommates receive two cars that they will be allowed to drive for the rest of the season. Jenn brings home a man named John, despite the fact that she has a boyfriend named Jared back home, and when the housemates tease her, she asserts that she did not sleep with him. During their argument, Alex suggests that the two of them have sex for a second time, but Jenn says that their night together was a drunken mistake that she will not repeat. The housemates learn they will be working for Outward Bound, which displeases Brooke.
397	9	"Outward Bound"	January 3, 2007
The housemates meet their Outward Bound trainer, Raleigh, who will teach them mountain survival skills, such as stepping into a mountain lake and navigating an obstacle course, which poses difficulty to Brooke, who is embarrassed at the anxiety that these activities cause her. Despite this and her fear of heights, Jenn encourages her into climbing Turtle Rock with her housemates.
398	10	"Breaking Point"	January 10, 2007
Tyrie and Brooke have difficulty with an abseiling exercise with Outward Bound, but while Tyrie manages to complete it, Brooke refuses to participate in it. She later declines to help Alex clean dishes, and repeatedly violates other rules, irritating their boss, Chris, who warns her for her behavior, and Alex, who admonishes her to accept responsibility for her behavior. Colie's illness relegates her to a camp with a man, Adam, to whom she is attracted.
399	11	"Hit Where It Hurts"	January 17, 2007
Stephen flirts with women at a bar, despite a prior agreement that Jenn would look out for him to prevent him from cheating on his girlfriend, Mercii. Davis and Brooke become closer, though Brooke tells him she does not wish to sleep with him because of his sexuality. Later, when Stephen and Alex bring home several girls to the hot tub, Jenn is upset at Stephen for cheating on his girlfriend, and he becomes enraged at Jenn when she mentions Mercii. Alex advises Stephen to retaliate by finding Jenn's sensitive spot for their next confrontation. After Davis relates this to Jenn, she confronts Alex, and they make amends.
400	12	"The Disabled List"	January 24, 2007
The group goes on another camping trip for their Outward Bound training. Colie is told that she is not allowed to talk to Adam because he is an employee for Outward Bound, but after he informs her that he quit the job in order to be with her, they go on a date, during which she tells him she has an open relationship with her ex-boyfriend, Cory. Brooke sprains her ankle and with a doctor's note, she is exempt from the trip, much to her satisfaction. Stephen and Davis become sick and their boss sends Brooke, Stephen and Davis back to Denver so they can recover, much to the pleasure of all three of them.
401	13	"Reaching the Peak"	January 31, 2007
While Alex, Colie, Jenn and Tyrie are hiking up a mountain for their Outward Bound training, the group becomes closer. However, Tyrie has to stop when he gets an asthma attack. Back at the Denver house, Brooke, Davis and Stephen go out for a drink and while Brooke decides to go to a spa, Davis decides to rejoin his other roommates and goes back to Outward Bound. Alex, Colie and Jenn make it to the summit of the mountain with their instructors, Chris and Raleigh. When the roommates return to Denver, Brooke greets them at the door in her bathing suit, disappointing Colie and Jenn.
402	14	"Playing the Field"	February 7, 2007
Alex brings home a local girl, Stacy, to the house, of whom Colie does not approve. The following day, Colie goes on a date with Adam and brings him to the house. When he asks her about her relationship with her ex-boyfriend, Cory, Colie tells him their relationship is platonic, even though he is coming to visit Denver soon. When Alex subsequently brings Stacy to the house again, he asks Colie about how she would feel about his having sex with her, and Colie gives him her approval. Alex later admits to Colie that he does have feelings for her, but does not wish to be in a relationship with her.
403	15	"Out and Proud"	February 14, 2007
During a visit to a local gay pride festival, Davis finds a church that is accepting of homosexuals, and visits it with Stephen the following day, though the fact that Davis is both Christian and gay perplexes Stephen. Davis subsequently relates to Stephen how his family rejected him because of his sexuality. When Davis' boyfriend, P.J., visits and shares a sexual interlude with Davis, Stephen sequesters himself from the bedroom he shares with Davis. The couple later double dates with Stephen and his girlfriend, Mercii.
404	16	"Lashing Out"	February 21, 2007
After a night of drinking, Alex has a sleepover in Colie's bed, right before her ex-boyfriend, Corey, with whom she was planning to break up, comes to visit. Brooke comes into conflict with Colie and Jenn over household cleaning duties. Alex's friend, Brett, comes to visit and tells Colie that Alex wants to keep their relationship platonic. A discussion on group driving plans to a local attraction results in an enraged Brooke screaming at Jenn and storming out. During a day out together, Alex and Jenn once again become intoxicated and begin making out.
405	17	"Letting Go"	February 28, 2007
Colie and Cory have sex upon his arrival in Denver, as do a drunken Jenn and Alex. Brooke, annoyed at the lovemaking going on in her bedroom, calls her mother, who advises her to address issues of conflict right away before they escalate. Jenn and Brooke make amends over their prior conflict. Ty advises Colie that she would be better off by not trying to be with Alex. After Cory returns home, he calls her and breaks up with her because he feels he was holding her back from enjoying other relationships.
406	18	"Butting In"	March 7, 2007
While at a bar, Davis suggests that he and his boyfriend, P.J., have a threesome with Brooke. Instead, she begins making out with Tyrie. On his last night in Denver, Davis apologizes to P.J., who was bothered by Davis' attraction to Brooke and says that nothing will come between them. The Outward Bound boss, Chris, calls to inform Brooke, Davis and Stephen that they still need to finish their Outward Bound training. While on a hike, Davis and Brooke get into a heated argument stemming from the PJ situation, making the completion of the trip difficult for them and Stephen, though they later make amends.
407	19	"Juggling Act"	March 14, 2007
Jenn tells her boyfriend, Jared, she cheated on him with Alex. While he tells her he has been faithful, Jenn's sister tells her that he has seen kissing other women back home. Upset, Jenn starts pursuing Stephen's visiting friend, Darnell. Meanwhile, Tyrie and Jazalle begin to get serious, but his former flame, Ashley, shows up again since she happens to be a waitress at the bar they are at. Jazalle becomes upset with this, leading to a fight with Tyrie back at the house that the other roommates try to break up.
408	20	"Locked Up"	March 19, 2007
Tyrie is arrested by police for public urination, requiring Jazalle to post bail for him. Meanwhile, Jenn and Jared break up for good when he decides that he cannot trust her. Tyrie and Jazalle then talk about their problems and resolve to move on. However, Jenn, with whom they discuss this, still feels bad about Tyrie's behavior, and considers leaving Denver.
409	21	"Leaving Early"	March 26, 2007
Tyrie tells the Outward Bound boss, Chris, that he is thinking of quitting, but Chris convinces him to stay. Despite having had an argument with Stephen, he and Colie go to pick up young boys who were affected by Hurricane Katrina at the airport. As the rest of the roommates are driving to the campsite, they make a wrong turn and end up being over three hours late. After the group is done climbing the mountain, Stephen tells them he has to leave early so he can make it in time for his sister's wedding, which annoys his fellow castmates.
410	22	"Personal Evaluations"	April 4, 2007
Stephen returns from his sister's wedding after his roommates finish their excursion with the Hurricane Katrina victims. When all of the cast but Stephen is praised for their Outward Bound work, Stephen comes into conflict with Tyrie and Colie, whom he blames for this, though he later makes amends with both of them.
411	23	"False Appearances"	April 9, 2007
Davis expresses his opinions of the female housemates' appearances, and after he makes a negative remark about Brooke's appearance, she reacts furiously by wrecking his bed. Meanwhile, Tyrie enjoys being single after he and Jazalle break up.
412	24	"Loose Lips"	April 18, 2007
Jenn's boyfriend from home, Jared, comes to visit. When Davis tells Jared that Jenn had been cheating on him, he is upset with her for not telling him the truth. However, after she tells him about a one night stand that she had, he finally forgives her for being honest with him. Meanwhile, Brooke gives her phone number to a guy she met at a restaurant named Kyle.
413	25	"Conquering Fears"	April 25, 2007
During the final week of Outward Bound, Brooke's fear of heights is tested when the group rappels down a cliff. Colie becomes sick once again, and is sent back to the Denver house to prevent her from contaminating the others. When the group finishes their hike to the top of the mountain, Brooke reveals how the experience of Outward Bound has changed her. Chris tells the roommates they will be taking a vacation soon as a reward.
414	26	"Make-Out Bandits"	May 2, 2007
After another date with Adam, Colie invites him to sleep over at the house, but he declines the invitation, after which a drunken Colie ends up sleeping in the same bed with Alex. She later brings home a male model named Justin. Meanwhile, Davis' mother and sister visit Denver to celebrate his birthday. Later, the roommates are told they are going on a trip to Thailand.
415	27	"Welcome to Paradise"	May 9, 2007
After the group arrives in Thailand, Colie begins hanging out with an Australian man, and has sex with him, annoying her fellow roommates as they are now unable to sleep in their room. During a boat ride preceding a snorkeling trip, Colie becomes drunk and later cuts her toe, however when Brooke falls on her coccyx, the roommates give her more attention, despite Colie actually being the one who's bleeding. Alex becomes annoyed with Colie for her selfishness. Meanwhile, Jenn and Stephen begin to get along.
416	28	"Out With a Bang"	May 16, 2007
During their last week in Denver, Jenn and Stephen become closer and begin flirting with one another. Stephen realizes he is uncomfortable with this since both of them have relationships back home. Davis' sexual encounter with a man named Josh is observed by Jenn and Colie, though he later denies having had sex with him. Davis later admits that he "just wants to be straight" but he later comes to terms with his sexuality. The roommates leave Denver one by one, and Brooke, the final one to leave, thanks Denver for changing her life.

== After filming ==
After the cast left the Real World house, all seven of them appeared to discuss their experiences both during and since their time on the show, Welcome to the Mile High Club: The Real World Denver Reunion, which premiered on May 23, 2007, and was hosted by Susie Castillo.

At the 2008 The Real World Awards Bash, Davis and Tyrie won "Best Fight", Colie won "Biggest Playa" and Brooke won "Best Meltdown" (for which she was nominated twice. Other nominees included Alex and Jenn, as well as Brooke and Jenn (and Tyrie) for "Steamiest Scene", Tyrie for "Best Brush with the Law", Jenn for "Hottest Female" and "Best Dance-Off", and Alex for "Hottest Male".

In 2016, Tyrie Ballard welcomed his first daughter, named Elyssa Diem in honor of the late Diem Brown.

Davis Mallory has been sober since 2017. That same year, he released his first EP, Loud. In 2018, he dropped a video for his single "Sun & Moon". His discography also includes a song he wrote in memory of Diem Brown titled "Beautiful Girls".

In 2019, Colie Edison started as CEO of the Professional Bowlers Association and later appeared on season 10 of Undercover Boss.

Jenn Grijalva's first son, Thiago Angelo Diaz was born in January 2021.

=== The Challenge ===
Cast member	Seasons of The Challenge	Other appearances
Alex Smith	The Gauntlet III	—N/a
Brooke LaBarbera	The Gauntlet III, The Duel II	—N/a
Colie Edison	The Inferno 3, The Island	—N/a
Davis Mallory	The Inferno 3, The Duel II, Rivals	—N/a
Jenn Grijalva	The Inferno 3, The Island, The Duel II, Fresh Meat II, Cutthroat (2010), Rivals	—N/a
Stephen Nichols	—N/a	—N/a
Tyrie Ballard	The Inferno 3, The Gauntlet III, The Island, Rivals, Battle of the Exes, Rivals II	The Challenge: All Stars (season 4)
