= Irene McGee =

American podcaster

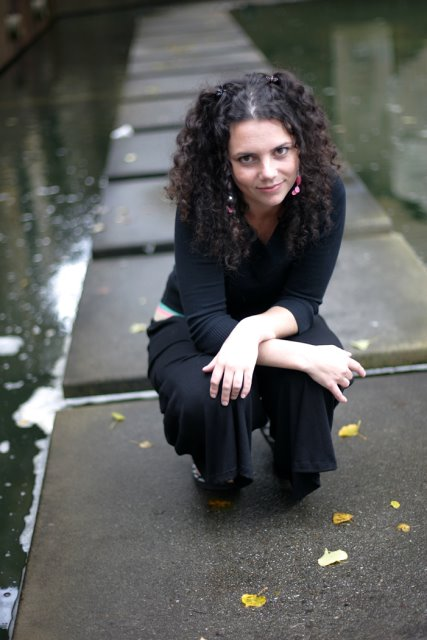
- Education: BA, English MA, Broadcast and Electronic Communication Arts
- Alma mater: Georgetown University, San Francisco State University
- Occupation: Radio podcast host
- Known for: The Real World: Seattle cast member, 1998

Irene McGee (born 1976) is a podcaster and television personality who created and hosted No One's Listening, a podcast about the mass media.

She came to public attention in 1998 as a cast member of the MTV reality television series, The Real World: Seattle. McGee left the show during filming due to ethical objections of the production. In late 2013, she wrote an article for Vulture explaining her early departure and regrets over her remarks in her deposit titled "Slaps, Lies and Video Tape". McGee has since performed a stand-up routine explaining her life since the show's filming.

== Early life ==
McGee is originally from Pleasant Valley, New York. She graduated from Georgetown University with a degree in English and went on to receive her master's degree in broadcast electronic communication arts from San Francisco State University.

== Career ==
=== The Real World: Seattle ===
McGee appeared on the show's seventh season, The Real World: Seattle, in 1998, during which she was described by The Seattle Times as "the cynical girl from New York state". During filming, she appeared sick and was suffering from headaches, and during the 14th episode, she told the others that she had Lyme disease, then left during the next episode. As she was leaving, a heated exchange with another housemate, Stephen Williams, ended with him opening the passenger door of her car and slapping her. The producers gave the cast the decision as to whether to evict Williams, and they decided to let him stay if he would attend anger-management therapy. Activist Jello Biafra discussed the event:

We know Real World is not the real world. I recently met a woman named Irene McGee who quit this show and said not even the house was real. The fridges were all filled to the brim with Vlasic pickles delivered daily by the crate load along with gallons of Nantucket Nectar. If she drank anything else, the crew took it from her hand and made sure the Nantucket Nectar label was facing the camera instead. When she walked out, another guy in the cast of Real World hit her and the camera guy did nothing ... When she spoke out, MTV sued her. And Entertainment Weekly rated Irene getting smash mouthed the 47th most interesting event on TV that whole year ... Can't you MTV think of a better way to raise audience awareness of domestic violence than to make it look cool?

VH1 ranked the slapping incident as the 9th most shocking reality TV moment. In 2014, MTV included the slapping incident in a list of "The Most Iconic Moments From 'Real World's First 10 Seasons".

Despite the show's portrayal of her having Lyme disease as the reason for her departure from filming, a previously unaired interview from the show filming aired during the 2000 reunion show, The Real World Reunion 2000, that the true reason was her ethical objections to aspects of the show's production. She has since lectured at numerous colleges and conferences nationwide about media manipulation and media literacy.

=== Other work ===
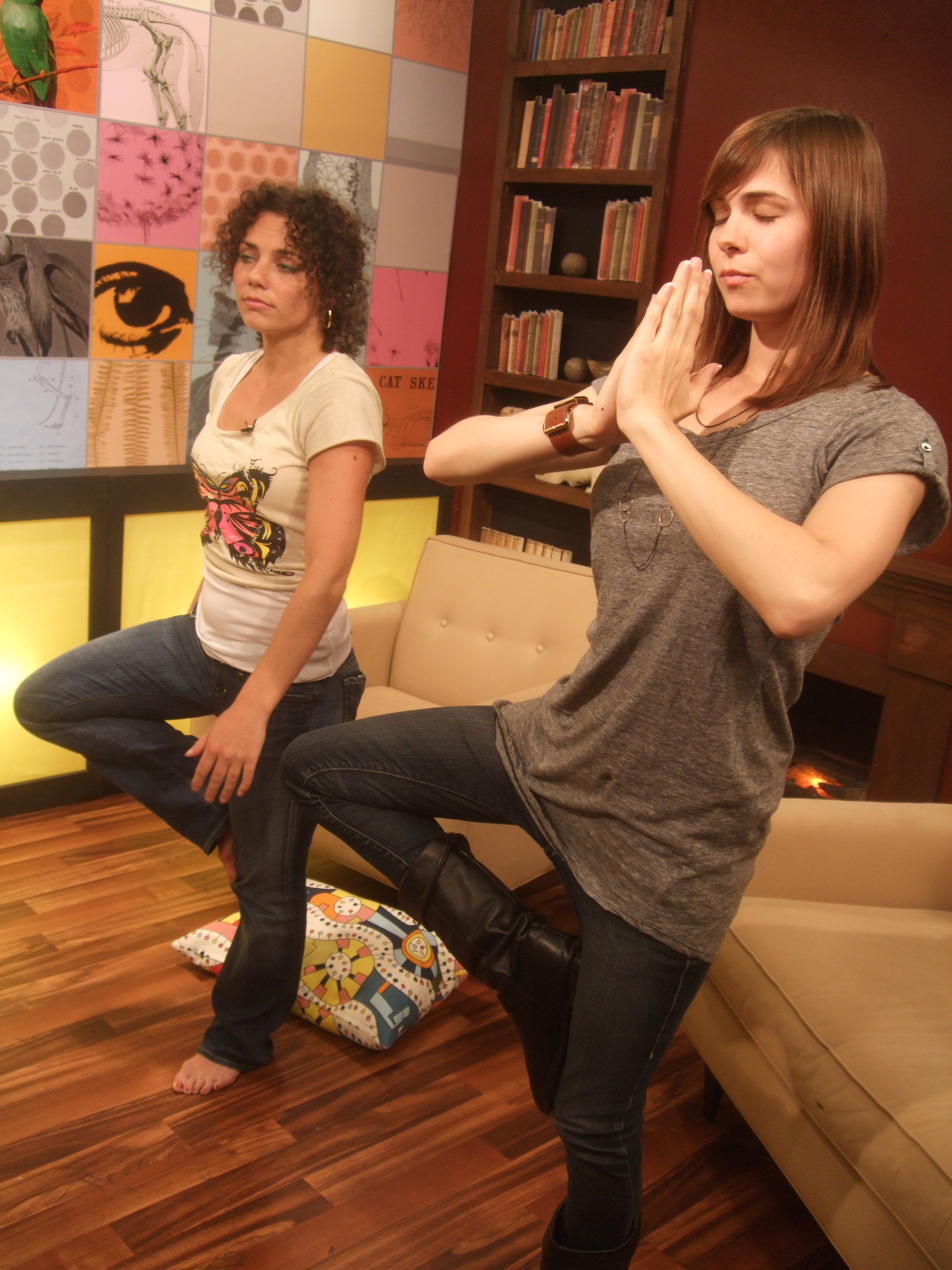
McGee with Veronica Belmont at Revision3 in 2008.

While earning a master's degree in Broadcast and Electronic Communication Arts from San Francisco State University, McGee began a youth-oriented radio show/podcast, No One's Listening, broadcast out of the university. The show included interviews with Noam Chomsky, Lawrence Lessig, Brewster Kahle, Violet Blue, and Jimmy Wales, and won the 2006 Pubbie Award as Best Bay Area Podcast by the San Francisco Bay Area Publicity Club. It ran from 2005 to 2014. She has spoken to colleges about media manipulation and reality television, and has appeared on VH1 and E! Entertainment Television. She hosted a talk radio show on KIFR a CBS station called "The Irene McGee Show". In 2008, she hosted a Revision3 show, Social Brew.

McGee has also been involved with a documentary about Lyme Disease, Under Our Skin: The Untold Story of Lyme Disease. In May 2018, she started a nonprofit Nap4Lyme, to raise awareness and money for the Disease.

McGee was the co-founder and editor of a health education site FYILiving.com, which was acquired by Action Factory.

McGee wrote and starred in a one-person comedic storytelling show about her life called "Me, Myself, and Irene."
