= Duel (disambiguation) =

A duel is a pre-arranged, private fight between two persons to settle a point of honour or personal quarrel.

Duel may also refer to:

== Combat ==
- Duel, any competition between two persons or parties
- Duel, a fight between two animals (see tournament species)
- Duel, single combat, in general
- Duel, the wager of battle

== Arts, entertainment, and media ==
=== Films ===
- Duel (1971 film), a film directed by Steven Spielberg
- Duel (2004 film), an Iranian film directed by Ahmad Reza Darvish

=== Games ===
- Duels (video game), a web-based role-playing game
- Duel (role-playing game), published by Nightshift Games in 1992

=== Music ===
Groups

- Duels (band), an English band from Leeds

Songs and albums

- "Duel" (Morganne Matis song), 2004
- "Duel" (Propaganda song), 1985
- "Duel", a song by Bond from Born
- "Duel", a song by Swervedriver from Mezcal Head
- Duel, a 2017 album by Quentin Mosimann
- Duél, a 2025 album by Jinjer

=== Television ===
==== Episodes ====
- "Duel", a 1978 episode of Blake's 7
- "Duel", a 1998 episode of Rab C. Nesbitt
- "Duel", a 1988 episode of Mr. Belvedere
- "Duel", a 2005 episode of New Captain Scarlet
- "Duel", a 2018 episode of Gundam Build Divers
- "Duel", a 2024 episode of The Madame Blanc Mysteries
- "Duel", a 2024 episode of The Greatest Demon Lord Is Reborn as a Typical Nobody

==== Shows ====
- Duel (American game show) (2007–2008)
- Duel (British game show) (2008)
- Duel (South Korean TV series) (2017)
- Series titles of reality game shows on MTV:
  - Real World/Road Rules Challenge: The Duel (2006–2007)
  - Real World/Road Rules Challenge: The Duel 2 (2009)

== Places ==
- Dueling Creek, a tributary of the Anacostia River in Maryland

== Other uses ==
- Dueling roller coasters, when roller coasters have two tracks which launch simultaneously and are designed to create near misses
- Duel – The Haunted House Strikes Back, a ride at the Alton Towers theme park
- Duel.com, an online casino founded by Finnish entrepreneur and poker player Ossi Ketola

== See also ==
- Deuel (disambiguation)
- Dual (disambiguation)
- Duelist (disambiguation)
- Duell (disambiguation)
- The Duel (disambiguation)
