= Le Duel =

Le Duel may refer to:

- The Duel (1927 film), a French silent film
- The Duel (1939 film), a French film

== See also ==
- The Duel (disambiguation)
