= Duell =

Duell may refer to:

== People ==
- Charles Holland Duell (1850–1920), New York politician and federal judge
- Holland S. Duell (1881–1942), New York politician, and decorated World War I hero
- R. Holland Duell (1824–1891), US congressman from New York
- Chad Duell (born 1987), American actor
- Joseph Duell (1956–1986), American dancer and choreographer
- Randall Duell (1903–1992)
- William Duell (1923–2011)

== Companies ==
- Duell, Sloan and Pearce, a former publishing company located in New York

== Other ==
- Duell (game), a board game

== See also ==
- Deuel (disambiguation)
- Duel (disambiguation)
