= The Real World: Philadelphia =

- Season 15
- The cast of The Real World: Philadelphia
- Starring: Landon Lueck; Willie Hernandez; Sarah Burke; M.J. Garrett; Karamo Brown; Melanie Silcott; Shavonda Billingslea
- No. of episodes: 26

Release
- Original network: MTV
- Original release: September 7, 2004 – March 8, 2005

Season chronology
- ← Previous; The Real World: San Diego Next → The Real World: Austin

The Real World: Philadelphia is the fifteenth season of MTV's reality television series The Real World, which focuses on a group of diverse strangers living together for several months in a different city each season, as cameras follow their lives and interpersonal relationships. It is the first season of The Real World to be filmed in Pennsylvania.

The season featured seven people who lived in a three-story building, and production began filming from April 30 to August 20, 2004. The season had a cast introduction special on August 24, 2004. The season premiered on September 7 of that year and consisted of 26 episodes. The season premiere was watched by 3.3 million viewers.

== Season changes ==
The Philadelphia season is the first with two openly gay men, Karamo Brown and William Hernandez, in the cast. (The first season to have two gay cast members, regardless of sex, was the 2002 Chicago season, although the 1999 Hawaii season featured a bisexual woman and a gay man).

== Assignment ==
Beginning with the show's fifth season, almost every season of The Real World has included the assignment of a season-long group job or task to the housemates, continued participation in which has been mandatory to remain part of the cast since the Back to New York season. The Philadelphia cast worked for the Philadelphia Soul, an Arena Football League team, which was formerly partly owned by Jon Bon Jovi. As part of their duties for the Soul, the cast planned and built a playground for underprivileged children as part of the Northern Home for Children program.

== The residence ==
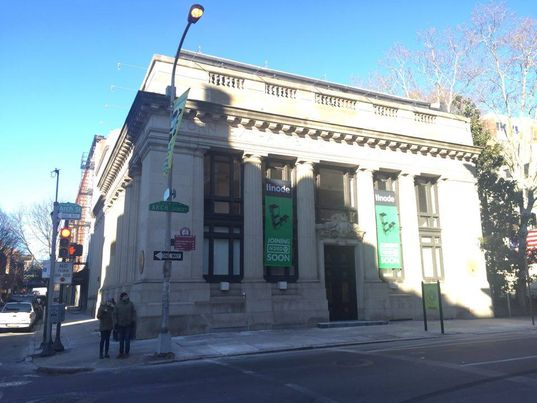
The cast's house at Third and Arch Street in Center City Philadelphia

The cast lived in a building at 249-251 Arch Street at 3rd Street in the Old City Philadelphia section of Philadelphia at (39.9522°N 75.1453°W). The 14,494-square-foot (1,346.5 m^{2}), three-story building, which is adjacent to the Betsy Ross House, was built in 1902, and was known as the Union Bank of Philadelphia Building until 1970, when it was sold to Seamen's Church Institute to house global seafarers. It was placed on the Philadelphia Register of Historic Places in January 1977, and purchased in 2003 by Yaron Properties, Inc for $2.2 million USD. An additional $3 million was spent on renovating and furnishing the building for production of the series, which included 42 mounted cameras for filming. The interior was designed by Norm Dodge of Norm Dodge & Associates.

In March 2004, producers ceased construction after completing two thirds of the project, and announced they were leaving Philadelphia because of disputes with Philadelphia trade unions. Joey Carson, CEO of Bunim/Murray, and Ted Kenney, a producer on The Real World, met in private over a two-week period with the trade unions. The meetings were brokered by Mayor John F. Street, Governor Ed Rendell, Congressman Bob Brady, and other civic leaders in order to keep the production in Philadelphia. The flap delayed renovations by several weeks. The interior decorations used for the series remained until as late as October 2004. Since filming ended, the building has served as an art gallery for The Art Institutes of Philadelphia's F.U.E.L. Collection and has become an office for Linode since late 2015.

== Cast ==
Cast member	Age^{1}	Hometown/State
Karamo Brown	23	Coral Springs, Florida
Karamo lives in Houston, Texas who donates much of his time to charities and political causes, which he says are his passion. He is very close to his mother and three older sisters. He attended Florida A&M University, where he majored in Business Administration. Prior to casting, he lived in Los Angeles, where he worked at the Brotherhood Crusade, writing proposals for grants and establishing programs for underprivileged people. He is an avid fan of Beyoncé Knowles, the Los Angeles Lakers, and the band Octavius, enjoys going to art galleries, and dreams of visiting Japan. Although he is gay, Karamo appeared as a contestant on a 2003 episode of The 5th Wheel, a heterosexual reality dating game show. He and another male contestant went on a joint date with three female contestants, with Karamo giving no indication that he is gay.
Landon Lueck	24	River Falls, Wisconsin
Landon is an athlete who in high school was a state champion in doubles tennis and ranked fifth in the state in wrestling. At the University of Wisconsin–Madison, he was on the water skiing and wake boarding teams. He doesn’t like being labeled a "dumb jock", however, and fears that others won't accept him. He recently ended a seven-year relationship with his high school sweetheart, and still hasn't gotten over her. He loves female attention, and longs for a long-term relationship again. He is a fan of Brad Pitt, AC/DC, and Newlyweds: Nick and Jessica, and dreams of visiting Thailand. He is sometimes observed to drink too much, which leads to problems with his castmates.
Melanie Silcott	21	San Jose, California
Melanie ("Mel") was adopted at six months after being placed into foster care by her seventeen-year-old mother. She is an alumna of the University of California, Santa Cruz and hopes to become a high school English teacher. She has a boyfriend named Andy. She claims to have a spontaneous, wild streak, loves to dance and party, is close to her family, and claims to be passionate about music, art, and politics. She is an avid fan of David Bowie and the band Modest Mouse. The cast often takes umbrage at what they perceive as Mel's rudeness and lack of consideration for others, as well as aloofness for choosing to frequent a local tavern by herself, and consorting with some friends there to the exclusion of her housemates.
M.J. Garrett	23	Nashville, Tennessee
M.J. graduated from Vanderbilt University, where he majored in Human and Organizational Development, and was a football player. He had dreams of playing professional football, but he was turned down by the NFL. He auditioned after finding his post-graduate, 9-to-5 desk job doing marketing at a non-profit organization unfulfilling, and after a chance meeting with a member of the casting department during a visit to Los Angeles, to which he intended to move. M.J. began a two-month relationship before moving to Philadelphia, and he struggles to maintain it long-distance. He is close to his father, and his younger brother Austin, and is proud to be “a jock who can express himself.” He is a fan of Ali G and Dashboard Confessional. He has a preference for blonde women, which is partially the cause of conflict between him and Sarah in Episodes 2 and 3.
Sarah Burke	23	Tampa, Florida
Born and raised in Florida, Sarah graduated from Emory University. According to mtv.com, she is opinionated and outspoken, and isn’t afraid to use her sex appeal to get what she wants. She has overcome an eating disorder, which began when her mother was diagnosed with cancer. As her mother is still undergoing treatment, she continues to struggle with her weight. She was once raped, and she attributes her highly sexual behavior to this. She enjoys cooking, is passionate about politics, is a fan of the Tampa Bay Buccaneers, and dreams of visiting Brazil.
Shavonda Billingslea	21	San Diego, California
Shavonda is a woman who likes to party and to socialize with men. She lived a turbulent childhood, and in high school, she was a cheerleader and her school's first African-American homecoming queen. She struggles to support herself, and is putting herself through Grossmont Community College by working nights at a Hooters in Mission Valley. She has a boyfriend to whom she wants to be faithful, even though he is not the kind of jock that usually pursues her. She prefers jocks with a sense of humor.
Willie Hernandez	23	New York City, New York
Willie is a writer/actor with a passion for the arts and performing who works part-time as a personal shopper. He left home at the age of 15 after conflicts with his religious parents who do not "accept his lifestyle." He and his straight twin brother are the oldest of six children, who all remain close. He admits to being stubborn and confrontational. As a child, he worked in commercials and musical theater and was a regular on the children's television show Ghostwriter, which promoted literacy for children. He is an avid fan of Madonna and the band Scissor Sisters.

^Note 1: Age at the time of filming.

== Episodes ==
No. overall	No. in season	Title	Original release date
314	1	"Welcome to Philly!"	September 7, 2004
The seven strangers settle into their Philadelphia house. MJ and Landon are the first to meet, and find they have things in common. They meet Shavonda and then are joined by Willie and Sarah, who finds MJ very attractive. Karamo and Melanie meet and arrive at the house last. Sarah says she likes to walk around nude, and after removing her bra, invites her roommates to inspect her breast implants, but Landon demurs. Shavonda is surprised when Karamo reveals that he is gay, but keeps this from the others.
315	2	"'Out' in Philadelphia"	September 7, 2004
After expressing some trepidation to a friend, Karamo comes out to MJ and Landon. MJ and Sarah flirt. The housemates visit a gay bar.
316	3	"Bed-Swapping Begins"	September 14, 2004
After MJ and his girlfriend break up, Sarah hopes that he will turn his attention to her, despite MJ's penchant for blondes. Landon is unsure of how to address his feelings for Shavonda.
317	4	"Boys Will Be Boys"	September 21, 2004
The roommates learn that Sarah battled bulimia. Willie runs into an old friend at a gay festival and the two become reacquainted. A conflict develops between Sarah and Melanie.
318	5	"Gunning for Karamo"	September 28, 2004
While at a bar with MJ and Landon, Karamo is approached by several police officers who received a tip that he was carrying a weapon. Afterward, he becomes upset with MJ for not vouching for him. Shavonda has money problems.
319	6	"The Roomies Have Soul"	October 5, 2004
MJ has a chair thrown at him by a random guy at a bar. Also, the roommates receive their job assignment: working for the city's arena football team. Karamo and MJ make their peace.
320	7	"Ivana Have Some Fun!"	October 12, 2004
Sarah reveals a secret from her past to Melanie, explaining her needy behavior. Shavonda breaks up with her boyfriend before flirting with Landon.
321	8	"Frustrations"	October 19, 2004
Karamo has a crush on Dorian, who works at the gym, and later meets him while out clubbing. However, Karamo has some issues with the cameras chronicling that part of his life. Melanie's opinionated self grates on everyone's nerves; and the roommates scout locations for a playground they're to help build.
322	9	"Landon & Leo"	October 26, 2004
Landon has too much to drink while out on the town, which doesn't sit well with Shavonda. Melanie opens up to Sarah about her childhood.
323	10	"Things Change"	November 2, 2004
Shavonda learns Shaun has plans with his ex-girlfriend. Landon's ex-girlfriend Becky, who's dating his former roommate, visits.
324	11	"Happy Birthday MJ!"	November 9, 2004
The roommates celebrates MJ's birthday. Landon and Shavonda have a fight about the phone. Landon brings a young woman back to the house. Shaun sends Shavonda flowers.
325	12	"Passive Aggression"	November 16, 2004
Sarah cleans the house and has a run-in with Landon after he and MJ arrive home at 3 a.m. Later, the roommates work on the playground project, but Sarah, Willie and Karamo have no input into it, which upsets them.
326	13	"Switchin' Teams"	November 23, 2004
Sarah finds herself attracted to a gay man and contemplates pursuing a physical relationship with him. MJ meets an attractive blonde at a bar and brings her home.
327	14	"Forbidden Affair"	November 30, 2004
Landon is attracted to the accountant for the Philadelphia Soul, but their relationship is tempered by a "no fraternization" rule for interns. The roommates take part in the Easter Seals walk-a-thon.
328	15	"Gone Sour"	December 7, 2004
Sarah's mother, who is battling leukemia, visits with Sarah's sister and father. Karamo and Dorian's relationship hits a bumpy patch.
329	16	"MJ's Having Trouble with The Ladies"	December 28, 2004
Sarah and MJ argue about Mel Gibson's The Passion of the Christ, which Sarah believes is anti-Semitic. MJ butts heads with Shavonda over the phone. Willie misses work after a late night of revelry.
330	17	"Altercations"	January 4, 2005
After a night of partying, Landon almost gets into an altercation with Melanie's friends.
331	18	"Ew, Scabies!"	January 11, 2005
Melanie learns that she has body lice, which causes the other roommates to become concerned that they might get it too. The roommates present their plan for the playground to the Soul and Northern Home and learn their vacation destination.
332	19	"Fiji"	January 18, 2005
The roommates arrive in Fiji for their vacation. Sarah sets her sights on several British men. Melanie and Sarah try to work out their differences.
333	20	"Romantic Getaway"	January 25, 2005
The roommates continue their vacation in Fiji, where Shavonda and Landon become closer.
334	21	"Back to Reality"	February 1, 2005
After the roommates return to Philadelphia from their vacation, Shavonda calls Shaun and tells him about hooking up with Landon. Later, she and Landon have a heart-to-heart about their relationship.
335	22	"Intervention"	February 8, 2005
After a fight with Shavonda, Melanie contemplates heading home. Karamo, Landon and Melanie skip out on work, which doesn't sit well with Laura.
336	23	"Willie's Love Triangle"	February 15, 2005
Willie meets Neil while clubbing, and the two make plans for a date, but when Dan calls to say he'll be in town the same night, Willie dumps Neil.
337	24	"Ashley’s Visit"	February 22, 2005
MJ's girlfriend, Ashley, arrives for a visit, but the fun is short-lived when he's torn between entertaining her or his best friend. Meeting Ashley gives Landon a new perspective on MJ.
338	25	"Motherly Love"	March 1, 2005
Sarah's mom thinks she needs to lose weight, which causes a rift between the two. Karamo wants to gift a plaque to Landon for his extra work on the playground project.
339	26	"Losing You"	March 8, 2005
The seven roommates bid adieu to one another, and Philadelphia, before going their separate ways. Prior to the goodbyes, the roommates head out to a club with Willie and Landon worries about how his relationship with Shavonda will affect her after they part.

== Police altercation ==
On November 29, 2005, two Philadelphia police officers were arrested for aggravated assault, simple assault, criminal conspiracy and reckless endangerment, due to an altercation they had with a plainclothes officer guarding the Real World house during filming the previous year. According to UPI and TMZ.com, Officers Patrick Cavalieri and David McAndrews were off-duty when they went to the house during filming of the program, and began banging on the door. Officer Brian Copeland, the plain clothes officer guarding the house, tried to stop them, and was allegedly assaulted by the two fellow policemen, who were suspended for 30 days with the intent to dismiss, according to a department spokesman.

Cavalieri, a five-year veteran of the force, was eventually fired. One of the charges against him was dropped, but he was found not guilty of another, and reinstated in his job. He later sued the city and Copeland for violations of his civil and constitutional rights, asking for a minimum of $50,000 in damages. Copeland alleged that Cavalieri and his "friends" severely beat him, causing severe eye damage. Cavalieri alleged that Copeland was not an officially licensed police officer at the time of the incident, that he did not identify himself as an officer before attacking him, and that he lied several times during the investigation regarding his version of the incident and the injuries he incurred.

== After filming ==
Seven months after the cast left the Real World house, all seven of them appeared to discuss their experiences both during and since their time on the show, Fistful of Philly: The Real World Philadelphia Reunion, which premiered on March 15, 2005, and was hosted by Vanessa Minnillo.

At the 2008 The Real World Awards Bash, Shavonda received a nomination in the "Best Phonecall Gone Bad" category.

William Hernandez continued his acting career, appearing in movies such as Evicted, The Undercover Man, The Narrow Gate, and A Four Letter Word.

In 2016, Karamo Brown appeared as a cast member on the TV One original series The Next :15. In 2017, he hosted Are You the One? Second Chances. He is currently a member of the "Fab 5" in the 2018 Netflix reboot of Queer Eye. In 2019, he took part in the 28th season of Dancing with the Stars, thus being the first person from The Real World to be cast on the show.

=== The Challenge ===
Cast member	Seasons of The Challenge	Other appearances
Karamo Brown	The Inferno II	—N/a
Landon Lueck	The Inferno II, The Gauntlet 2, The Duel II, Fresh Meat II	Spring Break Challenge
Melanie Silcott	—N/a	—N/a
M.J. Garrett	The Gauntlet 2, The Gauntlet III, The Duel II	The Challenge: All Stars (season 2), The Challenge: All Stars (season 3)
Sarah Burke	—N/a	—N/a
Shavonda Bilingslea	The Inferno II	—N/a
Willie Hernandez	—N/a	—N/a
