= The Duel =

The Duel may refer to:

== Literature ==
- "The Duel" (poem), a poem by Eugene Field
- The Duel (Kleist novella), an 1811 novella by Heinrich von Kleist
- The Duel (Chekhov novella), an 1891 novella by Anton Chekhov
- The Duel (Kuprin novel), a 1905 novel by Aleksandr Kuprin
- "The Duel" (short story), 1908 short story by Joseph Conrad
- "The Duel" (Borges story), a 1970 short story by Jorge Luis Borges
- The Duel: Pakistan on the Flight Path of American Power, a 2008 book by Tariq Ali

== Film and television ==
- The Duel (1910 film), a Russian short film
- The Duel (1912 film), a French short comedy directed by Mack Sennett
- The Duel (1927 film), a French silent drama
- The Duel (1939 film), a French comedy-drama
- The Duel (1971 film), a Hong Kong martial arts film
- The Duel (2000 film), a Chinese wuxia comedy directed by Andrew Lau
- The Duel (2010 film), an American drama
- The Duel (2016 film), an American Western
- "The Duel" (How I Met Your Mother), a 2005 episode of How I Met Your Mother
- "The Duel" (The Office), a 2009 episode of The Office
- "The Duel" (Star Wars: Visions), a 2021 episode of an animated anthology series
- Real World/Road Rules Challenge: The Duel, the 2006–2007 season of the MTV reality television program Real World/Road Rules Challenge
- "The Duel", a composition by Giorgio Moroder for the film Electric Dreams

== Other ==
- The Duel: Test Drive II, a cross-platform racing game
- "The Duel (Part 1 & 2)", a 1948 78rpm disc by Dexter Gordon, with Teddy Edwards
- The Duel (album), a 2004 album by Allison Moorer
- The Duel (board game), a 1984 expansion for the board game Dune

== See also ==
- Duel (disambiguation)
