= The Challenge: All Stars season 2 =

The Challenge: All Stars
- Season 2
- Presented by: T. J. Lavin
- No. of contestants: 24
- Winners: Jonna Mannion; MJ Garrett
- Location: Cancún, Mexico
- No. of episodes: 10

Release
- Original network: Paramount+
- Original release: November 11, 2021 – January 13, 2022

Season chronology
- ← Previous; Season 1 Next → Season 3

The second season of The Challenge: All Stars premiered on Paramount+ on November 11, 2021. The season features twenty-four cast members from The Real World, Road Rules and The Challenge competing for $500,000.

== Format ==
The second season of The Challenge: All Stars features a daily challenge, nomination process and an elimination round.

- Daily Challenge: Players compete in a main challenge either individually, in pairs or in teams. For team challenges, each team must select one male and one female representative before the challenge begins. The winning male and female player (for individual challenges), winning pair (for pair challenges) or winning representatives (for team challenges) are immune from elimination and earn power for the round while respective losing players of each gender, losing pair or losing representatives of the last-place team are automatically sent into the Arena.
- Nominations: The daily challenge winners nominate two men and two women to potentially go into the elimination round. Players – excluding the daily challenge winners, daily challenge losers, four nominees and Life Shield holders if they used the Life Shield – must then publicly vote for one male and female to compete in the elimination round. The male and female who receive the most votes will participate in the elimination round.
- Eliminations (The Arena): The losers of the daily challenge compete in an individual elimination round against the nominated player of the same gender. The loser is eliminated while the winner remains in the game and earns the Life Shield for the next round of play.

In the sixth episode, players were required to form male-female teams of two to compete in the "Deep Dive" challenge. After the challenge, it was revealed that players would compete in these teams for the remainder of the season. The winning team of the daily challenge is immune while the losing team is automatically sent into the Arena. The winners must nominate two teams where at nominations, eligible players would vote for one of these teams to compete in the Arena against the last-place team.

Twists

- Life Shield: The winning players or team of an elimination round are awarded the "Life Shield" for the next cycle of the game. They may use the Life Shield to save themselves if they place last in the subsequent challenge, or save one of the nominees selected by the daily challenge winners. Players or teams are ineligible to vote for the respective cycle of the game if they elect to use the Life Shield.
  - If players use the Life Shield to save themselves as the losing representative in a team challenge, they must select a replacement player to compete in the Arena in their place. If teams use the Life Shield to save themselves after placing last in a challenge, the second-last team is sent to the Arena in their place.
  - If players use the Life Shield to save a nominee or nominated team, the winners of the daily challenge must select a replacement nominee in their place.

== Contestants ==
Male contestants	Original season	Finish
MJ Garrett	The Real World: Philadelphia	Winner
Darrell Taylor	Road Rules: Campus Crawl	Runner-up (Note: After Jonna & MJ won the Final Challenge, both Darrell & Janelle and Melinda & Nehemiah were still attempting to unlock their safes. No team was shown completing this portion; therefore both teams are listed as runners-up.)
Nehemiah Clark	The Real World: Austin	Runner-up
Tecumshea "Teck" Holmes	The Real World: Hawaii	Fourth place (Note: Ayanna & Teck withdrew from the Final Challenge during Phase One after Ayanna felt she couldn't continue due to mental and physical exhaustion.)
Brad Fiorenza	The Real World: San Diego (2004)	Episode 9
Laterrian Wallace	Road Rules: Maximum Velocity Tour	Episode 8
Cohutta Grindstaff	The Real World: Sydney	Episode 7 (Note: Prior to the episode 7 elimination, Casey was medically removed from the competition after learning that she was pregnant; Cohutta was concurrently sent home as a result of being Casey's partner. Due to Casey & Cohutta's departure, the episode 7 elimination round was cancelled and both teams set to participate remained in the game.)
Tyler Duckworth	The Real World: Key West	Episode 6
Steve Meinke	Road Rules: The Quest	Episode 5
Derrick Kosinski	Road Rules: X-Treme	Episode 4
Ryan Kehoe	Real World/Road Rules Challenge: Fresh Meat	Episode 3
Derek Chavez	The Real World: Cancun	Episode 2

Female contestants	Original season	Finish
Jonna Mannion	The Real World: Cancun	Winner
Janelle Casanave	The Real World: Key West	Runner-up
Melinda Collins	The Real World: Austin	Runner-up
Ayanna Mackins	Road Rules: Semester at Sea	Fourth place
Jodi Weatherton	Road Rules: X-Treme	Episode 9
Jasmine Fougere	The Real World: Cancun	Episode 8
Casey Cooper	Real World/Road Rules Challenge: Fresh Meat	Episode 7
Kendal Darnell	Road Rules: Campus Crawl	Episode 6 (Note: Prior to the "Pole Wrestle" elimination, Kendal was shown to be medically removed from the competition after suffering a joint disorder during the "Deep Dive" challenge. She later clarified that her removal was actually due to testing positive for COVID-19 during an unaired mid-filming hotel quarantine and that the symptoms were analogous with the injury she sustained. Due to uneven numbers, the "Pole Wrestle" elimination was played as an individual male elimination round.)
Tina Barta	Road Rules: South Pacific	Episode 5
Katie Cooley	Road Rules: The Quest	Episode 4
Sophia Pasquis	Road Rules: The Quest	Episode 3
Leah Gillingwater	The Real World: Paris	Episode 2

== Gameplay ==
=== Challenge games ===
- Boarding Party: Played in male/female pairs, teams must jump from a Zodiac boat onto a speeding motorboat, collect two colored skulls and cross a beam onto a second motorboat. They must then jump off the second boat and dunk the skulls into a basket while mid-air. The team with the fastest time wins while the team with the slowest time is automatically sent to the Arena.
  - Winners: Derrick K. & Jodi
- Around the Block: Played in two teams of eleven, two team members at a time race down a trail and collect one of their team's geometric puzzle pieces before the next two team members go. Once teams collect the eleven puzzle pieces, they must use them to solve their first puzzle at the bottom of a pyramid. After solving the first puzzle, teams follow the same process to collect another eleven puzzle pieces floating within a cenote before using them to solve their second puzzle on the second level of the pyramid. The first team to solve both puzzles and pull the lever at the top of the pyramid wins.
  - Winners: Brad, Darrell, Derrick K., Janelle, Jasmine, Katie, Laterrian, Melinda, Nehemiah, Tina & Tyler
- Bright Skies: Played in male and female rounds, players begin harnessed on a ledge off the side of a 25-story building. After being asked a question with multiple answers, such as naming a novel in the Harry Potter series, one player at a time must give one of the possible answers. If they answer incorrectly or provide a previously given answer, players are pulled off the ledge and drop ten-stories below. The last player of each gender standing wins while the first player of each gender to answer incorrectly, or refuse to participate, are automatically sent into the Arena.
  - Winners: Casey & Steve
- Bounce Back: Played two players at a time, players bounce across seven trampolines suspended above water, leaping off the final trampoline to collect a hanging puzzle piece. They must then swim to shore with their piece and repeat this process for all three puzzle pieces. After collecting all three pieces, players must use them to solve three math equations using the numbers printed on each piece. The male and female with the fastest time wins while the male and female with the slowest time are automatically sent to the Arena. In the event that multiple players are unable to complete the challenge, the last-place player is determined by the number of jumps they made off the final trampoline.
  - Winners: Darrell & Jodi
- Deep Dive: Teams begin on a 30-foot platform above a cenote. They can either jump directly into the cenote or climb down a ladder to a 15-foot platform and jump from there at the risk of losing time. Once in the cenote, teams must swim to four buoys and dive to collect a bag of puzzle pieces from chests submerged 15 feet under each buoy. After collecting all four bags of puzzle pieces, teams return to shore and use them to solve the 3D-puzzle. The team with the fastest time wins while the team with the slowest time is automatically sent into the Arena.
  - Winners: Brad & Jodi
- Steer Clear: Teams begin on the back of a monster truck, with one team member suspended from a 20-foot mounted crane boom off the side of the truck. As the monster truck speeds down a runway, their partner must steer the boom so they can collect flags attached to several cars and motorcycles along the runway. The team that collects the most flags wins while the team that collects the least flags is automatically sent to the Arena.
  - Winners: Brad & Jodi
- Dive & Conquer: While tethered together, teams run half a mile down a path towards a cenote. They must then jump into the cenote, swim towards the answer key and memorize it before returning down the path to their puzzle station. There, teams must replicate the answer key they memorized by placing tiles on a board, and are free to return to the cenote many or as few times as they wish. The first team to replicate their answer key wins while the last team is automatically sent to the Arena.
  - Winners: Jonna & MJ
- Make the Connection: Teams begin harnessed on top of a speeding semi-truck. Each team member must jump onto one of the two adjacent semi-trucks, each with four small boxes on them. They must untie knots to open each box and collect four keys inside before using the keys to unlock a larger box with their final key. Team members must then climb back onto the first semi-truck and use the key to unlock a final box containing an idol. There is a three-minute time limit before the adjacent trucks speed away and leave teams behind. The team with the fastest time wins while the team with the slowest time is automatically sent to the Arena.
  - Winners: Melinda & Nehemiah

=== Arena games ===
- Deadweight: Each player has three 300-pound coffins, each with a chain attached. They must pull each coffin across the Arena until they can secure the chains on a post at the opposite side. For two of the coffins, they must also solve a problem inside before they can begin pulling. The first player to secure all three chains to their post wins.
  - Played by: Derek C. vs Nehemiah, Ayanna vs. Leah
- Fireball: Similar to tic-tac-toe, players begin with five colored balls set on fire. They must transfer one ball at a time across the Arena and place them slots of a three-by-three board, attempting to line up three of their balls in a row either vertically, horizontally or diagonally to win the round. The first player to win two rounds wins.
  - Played by: Cohutta vs. Ryan, Jodi vs. Sophia
- Weight, There's More: Players must transfer 1,000 pounds of sandbags across the Arena to the end of their ramp to reveal a puzzle. The first player to solve the puzzle, which involves sorting colored skulls by sliding them into position, wins.
  - Played by: Ayanna vs. Katie, Brad vs. Derrick K.
- Switchback: Each player has three colored skulls placed on the boundary of the Arena that begin switched on. They must run across the Arena and flip the light switches off for their opponent's skulls, or switch their own skulls back on, while their opponent does the same. The first player to switch off all three of their opponent's skulls while also having at least of their skulls on wins.
  - Played by: Steve vs. Teck, Melinda vs. Tina
- Pole Wrestle: Players begin at the center of the Arena with both hands on a metal pole. The first player to wrestle the pole out of their opponent's hands twice wins.
  - Played by: Laterrian vs. Tyler
- Like Clockwork: One team member begins in a glass case which has six possible mechanical gear combinations printed on the floor. They must identify the gear combination that would correctly function when spun and verbally communicate it to their partner, who recreates the combination by placing colored gears on a puzzle board. During the elimination, the glass case would slowly fill with sand making it more difficult to view the combinations as time progresses. The first team to assemble the correct gear combination wins.
  - Played by: Jasmine & Laterrian vs. Melinda & Nehemiah
- Smash House: One team member begins in a furnished room and must use a sledgehammer to smash the furniture into pieces and fit them through a six-inch hole to the adjacent empty room where their partner is located. Their partner must then use a sledgehammer to smash the debris into smaller pieces and fit them through a three-inch hole and into a bucket. After ten minutes, the buckets are weighed. The team with the most weight in their bucket wins.
  - Played by: Brad & Jodi vs. Darrell & Janelle

=== Final Challenge ===
After the "Smash House" elimination, it was announced that the remaining four teams would immediately commence the Final Challenge.

Day one

- Overnight Stage: Each team is provided with one hammock for the night. One team member may sleep on the hammock at a time while their partner must stand on a log during this time.

Day two

Phase one: Teams race down a winding jungle path to the "Nucleus" area where they would find an empty board and instructions for three checkpoints located within the jungle. They must complete each checkpoint (in any order) to collect a mandala piece. After collecting all three mandala pieces, teams place them on the board to form a mandala. The first three teams to complete their mandala advance to Phase two while the remaining team is eliminated.

Checkpoints

- Decode: Teams are given a flashlight and must follow blue arrows through the jungle until they reach a dark cave. They must search for and memorize multiple symbols and their corresponding numbers printed on the cave's walls. They must then return to the Nucleus and decode the secret phrase "Redemption and Perseverance" on a decoding ring to receive their mandala piece.
- Memory: Teams follow red arrows through the jungle to a puzzle key with dozens of symbols printed on them. They must memorize the locations of each pair of symbols, return to the Nucleus and flip over covered squares on a memory board to reveal each pair to receive their mandala piece. If teams make a mistake, they must return to the puzzle key before they can continue.
- Pole Puzzle: Teams must ride two bicycles, which are tethered together, to the end of a path to find 14 three-dimensional puzzle pieces. They must then return all 14 pieces to the Nucleus and solve the vertical puzzle to receive their mandala piece.

- Eliminated: Ayanna & Teck (4th place — Quit)

Phase two: Teams must consume a plate of fish-eye tostadas, cricket-stuffed burritos and cockroach-topped nachos. Additionally, each team member must drink a glass of blood. Once complete, teams proceed to the end of a runway where they must solve several algebraic equations to find the numerical value of several symbols. Teams then use these values as the code to unlock their safe containing $500,000 worth of banknotes. The first team to open their safe and bring the money inside to a nearby plane are declared the winners of All Stars 2 and are awarded the $500,000 from their safe.

- Winners: Jonna & MJ — $500,000 ($250,000 each)
- Runners-up: Darrell & Janelle, Melinda & Nehemiah

== Game summary ==
Episode		Challenge type	Winners		Life Shield	Arena contestants				Arena game	Arena outcome	
#	Challenge	Challenge type	Team	Immune	Life Shield	Last-place	Voted in		Replacement(s)	Arena game	Winner	Eliminated
1/2	Boarding Party	Male/Female pairs	—N/a	Derrick K. & Jodi	—N/a	Nehemiah	Derek C.	Steve	—N/a	Deadweight	Nehemiah	Derek C.
1/2	Boarding Party	Male/Female pairs	—N/a	Derrick K. & Jodi	—N/a	Ayanna	Casey	Leah	—N/a	Deadweight	Ayanna	Leah
3	Around the Block	2 teams of 11	Black Team	Darrell	Nehemiah	Ryan	MJ	~~Teck~~	Cohutta	Fireball	Cohutta	Ryan
3	Around the Block	2 teams of 11	Black Team	Tina	Ayanna	~~Ayanna~~	Jodi	Jonna	Sophia (Note: As the Life Shield holder, Ayanna was given immunity from the Arena as losing representative and had to choose a replacement nominee. She selected Sophia.)	Fireball	Jodi	Sophia
4	Bright Skies	Individual	—N/a	Casey	Jodi	Katie	~~Jodi~~	Kendal	Ayanna	Weight, There's More	Ayanna	Katie
4	Bright Skies	Individual	—N/a	Steve	Cohutta	Brad	~~Cohutta~~	Tyler	Derrick K.	Weight, There's More	Brad	Derrick K.
5	Bounce Back	Individual	—N/a	Darrell	Brad	Steve	Teck	Tyler	—N/a	Switchback	Teck	Steve
5	Bounce Back	Individual	—N/a	Jodi	Ayanna	Melinda	~~Ayanna~~	Tina	Casey	Switchback	Melinda	Tina
6 (Note: After their original partners were eliminated and medically removed from the competition respectively, Jasmine and Laterrian formed a new team following the "Pole Wrestle" elimination at the end of episode 6.)	Deep Dive	Male/Female pairs	—N/a	Brad & Jodi	Teck	~~Jasmine &~~ Tyler	~~Ayanna & Teck~~	~~Melinda & Nehemiah~~	~~Kendal &~~ Laterrian	Pole Wrestle	Laterrian	Tyler
6	Deep Dive	Male/Female pairs	—N/a	Brad & Jodi	Melinda	~~Jasmine &~~ Tyler	~~Ayanna & Teck~~	~~Melinda & Nehemiah~~	Jonna & MJ	Pole Wrestle	Laterrian	Tyler
7	Steer Clear	Male/Female pairs	—N/a	Brad & Jodi	Jasmine & Laterrian	~~Jasmine & Laterrian~~	Casey & Cohutta	Melinda & Nehemiah	Ayanna & Teck	—N/a		
8	Dive & Conquer	Male/Female pairs	—N/a	Jonna & MJ	—N/a	Jasmine & Laterrian	Ayanna & Teck	Melinda & Nehemiah	—N/a	Like Clockwork	Melinda & Nehemiah	Jasmine & Laterrian
9	Make the Connection	Male/Female pairs	—N/a	Melinda & Nehemiah	Melinda & Nehemiah	Brad & Jodi	Darrell & Janelle	Jonna & MJ	—N/a	Smash House	Darrell & Janelle	Brad & Jodi
10	Final Challenge	Male/Female pairs	Jonna & MJ		2nd: Darrell & Janelle and Melinda & Nehemiah, 4th: Ayanna & Teck							

=== Episode progress ===
Contestants	Episodes								
Contestants	1/2	3	4	5	6	7	8	9	Finale
Jonna	SAFE	NOM	SAFE	SAFE	NOM	SAFE	WIN	NOM	WINNER
MJ	SAFE	NOM	SAFE	SAFE	NOM	SAFE	WIN	NOM	WINNER
Darrell	SAFE	WIN	SAFE	WIN	SAFE	SAFE	SAFE	ELIM	SECOND
Janelle	SAFE	WON	SAFE	SAFE	SAFE	SAFE	SAFE	ELIM	SECOND
Melinda	SAFE	WON	SAFE	ELIM	SAVE	RISK	ELIM	WIN	SECOND
Nehemiah	ELIM	WON	SAFE	SAFE	SAVE	RISK	ELIM	WIN	SECOND
Ayanna	ELIM	SAVE	ELIM	SAVE	SAVE	RISK	NOM	SAFE	FOURTH
Teck	SAFE	SAVE	SAFE	ELIM	SAVE	RISK	NOM	SAFE	FOURTH
Brad	SAFE	WON	ELIM	SAFE	WIN	WIN	SAFE	OUT	
Jodi	WIN	ELIM	SAVE	WIN	WIN	WIN	SAFE	OUT	
Jasmine	SAFE	WON	SAFE	SAFE	RISK	SAVE	OUT		
Laterrian	SAFE	WON	SAFE	SAFE	ELIM	SAVE	OUT		
Cohutta	SAFE	ELIM	SAVE	SAFE	SAFE	DQ			
Casey	NOM	SAFE	WIN	NOM	SAFE	MED			
Tyler	SAFE	WON	NOM	NOM	OUT				
Kendal	SAFE	SAFE	NOM	SAFE	MED				
Tina	SAFE	WIN	SAFE	OUT					
Steve	NOM	SAFE	WIN	OUT					
Derrick K.	WIN	WON	OUT						
Katie	SAFE	WON	OUT						
Sophia	SAFE	OUT							
Ryan	SAFE	OUT							
Leah	OUT								
Derek C.	OUT								

Competition
The contestant won the Final Challenge
The contestant did not win the Final Challenge
The contestant won the challenge and was granted immunity from the Arena
The contestant won the challenge, but was not granted immunity from the Arena
The contestant was not selected for the Arena
The contestant was saved from being nominated for the Arena by the Life Shield
The contestant placed last in the daily challenge or was voted into the Arena, but did not have to compete
The contestant was nominated by the winners, but was not voted to compete in the Arena
The contestant won the elimination in the Arena
The contestant was removed from the competition due to medical reasons
The contestant was disqualified from the competition due to their partner being removed
The contestant lost in the Arena and was eliminated
The contestant withdrew from the competition

== Voting progress ==
Loser	**Nehemiah** last-place	**Ayanna** last-place	**Ryan** losing rep.	**Sophia** losing rep.	**Katie** last-place	**Brad** last-place	**Steve** last-place	**Melinda** last-place	**Jasmine &** **Tyler** last-place	**Ayanna &** **Teck** last-place	**Jasmine &** **Laterrian** last-place	**Brad &** **Jodi** last-place
House Vote	**Derek C.** 10 of 16 votes	**Leah**; 13 of 16 votes	**Cohutta**; 11 of 12 votes	**Jodi**; 10 of 12 votes	**Ayanna**; 10 of 10 votes	**Derrick K.** 7 of 10 votes	**Teck**; 7 of 9 votes	**Tina**; 7 of 9 votes	**Kendal &** **Laterrian**; 3 of 4 votes	**Melinda &** **Nehemiah**; 4 of 4 votes	**Melinda &** **Nehemiah**; 3 of 4 votes	**Darrell &** **Janelle**; 2 of 3 votes (Note: The episode 9 nominations resulted in a tie between the two nominated teams. The winning team, Melinda & Nehemiah, had to collectively cast the deciding vote to break the tie and voted for Darrell & Janelle.)
Voter	Episode											
Voter	1/2		3		4		5		6	7	8	9
Jonna	Steve	Leah			Ayanna	Tyler	Teck	Tina		Melinda & Nehemiah		
MJ	Derek C.	Leah			Ayanna	Tyler	Teck	Tina		Melinda & Nehemiah		
Darrell	Derek C.	Leah			Ayanna	Tyler			Jonna & MJ	Melinda & Nehemiah	Melinda & Nehemiah	
Janelle	Steve	Leah	Cohutta	Jodi	Ayanna	Derrick	Teck	Tina	Kendal & Laterrian	Melinda & Nehemiah	Melinda & Nehemiah	
Melinda	Derek C.	Leah	Cohutta	Jodi	Ayanna	Derrick						**Darrell &** **Janelle**
Nehemiah					Ayanna	Derrick	Tyler	Casey				**Darrell &** **Janelle**
Ayanna												Darrell & Janelle
Teck	Derek C.	Leah	Cohutta	Jodi	Ayanna	Derrick						Jonna & MJ
Brad	Derek C.	Leah	Cohutta	Jodi			Teck	Casey			Ayanna & Teck	
Jodi											Melinda & Nehemiah	
Jasmine	Steve	Leah	Cohutta	Jodi	Ayanna	Derrick	Teck	Tina				
Laterrian	Derek C.	Casey	Cohutta	Jodi	Ayanna	Derrick	Tyler	Tina				
Casey			Cohutta	Jodi					Kendal & Laterrian			
Cohutta	Derek C.	Leah					Teck	Tina	Kendal & Laterrian			
Tyler	Steve	Leah	Cohutta	Jonna								
Kendal	Derek C.	Leah	Cohutta	Jodi			Teck	Tina				
Tina	—N/a	—N/a			Ayanna	Derrick						
Steve			Cohutta	Jodi								
Derrick K.			MJ	Jonna								
Katie	Derek C.	Casey	Cohutta	Jodi								
Sophia	Derek C.	Leah										
Ryan	Steve	Leah										
Leah												
Derek C.												

- **Bold** indicates the winning team casting a tiebreaking vote

== Team selections ==
Contestants	Episodes								
Contestants	1/2	3	4	5	6	7	8	9	Finale
Jonna	MJ	Green	Individual	Individual	MJ				
MJ	Jonna	Green	Individual	Individual	Jonna				
Darrell	Kendal	Black	Individual	Individual	Janelle				
Janelle	Tyler	Black	Individual	Individual	Darrell				
Melinda	Derek C.	Black	Individual	Individual	Nehemiah				
Nehemiah	Ayanna	Black	Individual	Individual	Melinda				
Ayanna	Nehemiah	Green	Individual	Individual	Teck				
Teck	Casey	Green	Individual	Individual	Ayanna				
Brad	Katie	Black	Individual	Individual	Jodi				
Jodi	Derrick K.	Green	Individual	Individual	Brad				
Jasmine	Ryan	Black	Individual	Individual	Tyler	Laterrian			
Laterrian	Leah	Black	Individual	Individual	Kendal	Jasmine			
Cohutta	Sophie	Green	Individual	Individual	Casey				
Casey	Teck	Green	Individual	Individual	Cohutta				
Tyler	Janelle	Black	Individual	Individual	Jasmine				
Kendal	Darrell	Green	Individual	Individual	Laterrian				
Tina	Steve	Black	Individual	Individual					
Steve	Tina	Green	Individual	Individual					
Derrick K.	Jodi	Black	Individual						
Katie	Brad	Black	Individual						
Sophia	Cohutta	Green							
Ryan	Jasmine	Green							
Leah	Laterrian								
Derek C.	Melinda								

== Episodes ==
No. overall	No. in season	Title	Original release date
10	1	"One More Time"	November 11, 2021
11	2	"It's So Hard To Say Goodbye"	November 18, 2021
12	3	"Firestarter"	November 25, 2021
13	4	"New Divide"	December 2, 2021
14	5	"Old Tina Can't Come to the Phone"	December 9, 2021
15	6	"A Whole New World"	December 16, 2021
16	7	"Save the Palace"	December 23, 2021
17	8	"(You Drive Me) Crazy"	December 30, 2021
18	9	"Break Stuff"	January 6, 2022
19	10	"It Takes Two"	January 13, 2022
