= Henri Lavedan =

French dramatist and man of letters

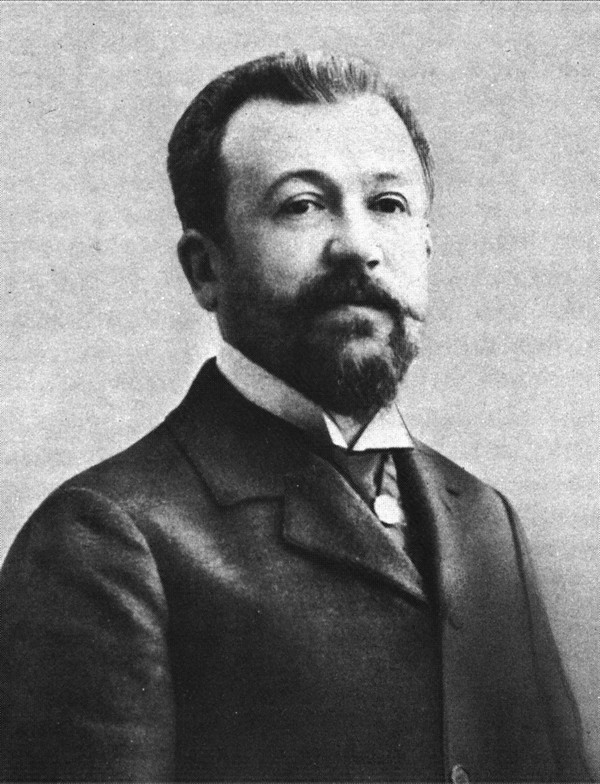
Henri Lavedan.

Henri Léon Emile Lavedan (9 April 1859 – 4 September 1940), French dramatist and man of letters, was born at Orléans, the son of Hubert Lavedan, a well-known Catholic and liberal journalist.

Lavedan contributed to various Parisian papers a series of witty tales and dialogues of Parisian life, many of which were collected in volume form. In 1891 he produced at the Théâtre Français Une Famille, followed at the Vaudeville in 1894 by Le Prince d'Aurec, a satire on the nobility, afterward renamed Les Descendants.

He had a great success with Le Duel (Comédie-Française 1905), a powerful psychological study of the relations of two brothers, which was turned into a movie—The Duel—on which he was a co-writer. It was translated into English by Louis N. Parker and performed in New York in 1906 at the Hudson Theatre.

Lavedan was admitted to the Académie française in 1898.

== Works ==
- Les Deux noblesses (1897)
- Catherine (1897)
- Le nouveau jeu (1898)
- Le Vieux marcheur (1899)
- Le Marquis de Priola (1902)
- Varennes (1904), written in collaboration with G. Lentre
- Le bon temps (1906)
- L’assassinat du duc de Guise (1908)
