= The Challenge: All Stars season 3 =

The Challenge: All Stars
- Season 3
- Presented by: T. J. Lavin
- No. of contestants: 25
- Winners: Jonna Mannion; Wes Bergmann
- Location: Panama City & San José Island, Panama
- No. of episodes: 10

Release
- Original network: Paramount+
- Original release: May 11 – July 6, 2022

Season chronology
- ← Previous; Season 2 Next → Season 4

The third season of The Challenge: All Stars premiered on Paramount+ on May 11, 2022. The season features twenty-five cast members from The Real World and Road Rules competing for $500,000.

== Format ==
The third season of The Challenge: All Stars consists of a daily challenge, winner's selection and an elimination round. All contestants were former finalists (Nia was given credit as a finalist on The Challenge: Battle of the Exes II, even though she was disqualified before the final elimination).

- Daily Challenge: Players individually compete in a main challenge. The last-place male and female are automatically sent to elimination. The three highest-placing male and female players form the "Authority" and are immune from elimination.
- The Authority: Players in the Authority are awarded the power to collectively select a male and female player to compete in an elimination round against the last-place players.
- Eliminations ("The Arena"): The last-place players from the daily challenge compete against the players selected by the Authority in an elimination round. The winners remain in the game while the losers are eliminated.

From episode 5, the Authority would be reduced to only the first-place male and female of each challenge and the format changed. The Authority had to collectively select one male and one female to compete in the Arena. At the Arena, the selected players must then call-out an opponent of the same gender to compete against them. The winners remain in the game while the losers are eliminated.

Twists

- Sabotage: Implemented for the first six episodes, the first-place male and female from daily challenge are awarded the "Sabotage" in addition to being part of the Authority. They may use the Sabotage to penalize another player (or themselves) with a disadvantage for the following daily challenge.
- Stars: Each player begins the game with one "Star". Upon winning an elimination round, players are awarded all the Stars their opponent currently possess. The more Stars a player has, the bigger an advantage they would receive later in the game. At the start of the Final Challenge, it was revealed that the player(s) with the most Stars would automatically receive five bonus points.

== Contestants ==
Male contestants	Original season	Finish
Wes Bergmann	The Real World: Austin	Winner
Brad Fiorenza	The Real World: San Diego (2004)	Runner-up
Nehemiah Clark	The Real World: Austin	Third place
Mark Long	Road Rules: USA – The First Adventure	Fourth place
Derrick Kosinski	Road Rules: X-Treme	Episode 9
Jordan Wiseley	The Real World: Portland	Episode 7
MJ Garrett	The Real World: Philadelphia	Episode 6
Yes Duffy	Road Rules: Semester at Sea	Episode 5
Darrell Taylor	Road Rules: Campus Crawl	Episode 4
Syrus Yarbrough	The Real World: Boston	Episode 3
Laterrian Wallace	Road Rules: Maximum Velocity Tour	Episode 2
Tyler Duckworth	The Real World: Key West	Episode 1

Female contestants	Original season	Finish
Jonna Mannion	The Real World: Cancun	Winner
Kailah Casillas	Real World: Go Big or Go Home	Runner-up
Nia Moore	The Real World: Portland	Third place
KellyAnne Judd	The Real World: Sydney	Fourth place
Veronica Portillo	Road Rules: Semester at Sea	Episode 8 (Note: Prior to the "Flight Pattern" challenge, Veronica was medically removed from the competition after suffering an injured toe. Due to uneven numbers, the female "Light My Fire" elimination round between Kailah and KellyAnne was canceled and both players remained in the game. In addition to being part of the Authority, it was announced that the female winner of the "Flight Pattern" challenge would receive Veronica's Star she possessed at the time of her departure.)
Roni Chance	Road Rules: Northern Trail	Episode 7
Sylvia Elsrode	Real World: Skeletons	Episode 6
Beth Stolarczyk (Note: Prior to the "High Stakes" challenge, Beth entered the competition as a replacement due to Jemmye and Tina's departure from the competition during the previous episode.)	The Real World: Los Angeles	Episode 5 (Note: Beth withdrew midway through the "Knock Off" elimination after feeling it was unfair her opponent Jonna was receiving help from MJ.)
Kendal Sheppard	Road Rules: Campus Crawl	Episode 4
Jemmye Carroll	The Real World: New Orleans (2010)	Episode 3 (Note: Prior to the "Weight Up" elimination, Jemmye withdrew from the competition due to a family emergency regarding her father's health back at home and Tina was medically removed from the competition after breaking her hand during the "Playing Dirty" challenge.)
Tina Barta	Road Rules: South Pacific	Episode 3
Melinda Collins	The Real World: Austin	Episode 2 (Note: Melinda elected not to compete in the "Lights Out" elimination due to a sprained ankle she sustained during the Final Challenge of All Stars 2. Therefore, Tina was declared the winner by default and received Melinda's star.)
Cynthia Roberts	The Real World: Miami	Episode 1

== Gameplay ==
=== Challenge games ===
- Tunnel Vision: Played in male and female rounds, players must look through small holes in a stone wall to view a 16-square pattern on the other side. They must then return to their board and replicate the pattern using tiles. The first player in each round to correctly replicate the pattern wins, with the next two players joining them in the Authority. The last players in each heat to replicate the pattern are automatically sent to the Arena.
  - Winners: Sylvia & Wes
- Out of Reach: Played in male and female heats, players begin on a swing suspended above water. They must generate momentum and swing high enough to kick a key off a ledge into the water below. They must then retrieve the key, return to shore, and unlock a box of puzzle pieces before solving the puzzle. Players are automatically dropped and assigned a 20-minute penalty if they are unable to kick their key off after an extended period or are disqualified if they fall off the swing. The male and female player with the fastest time wins, with the next two players with the fastest times joining them in the Authority. The male and female with the slowest times are automatically sent to the Arena.
  - Winners: Kendal & Yes
- Playing Dirty: Played in male and female heats over three rounds. Each round, players must collect a ball from a mud-pit and bring it outside of the mud-pit to advance to the next round while the number of balls decrease each round. The first male and female player to exit the mud-pit with a ball in the third round wins, with the other two players in each heat able to collect a ball during the same round joining them in the Authority. The male and female player without a ball after the first round are automatically sent to the Arena.
  - Winners: Brad & Kailah
- High Stakes: Played in male and female heats of three, players begin suspended on a ledge off the side of a 150-foot building and must solve a math equation. The first player in each heat to solve their equation may drop the other two players from their heat in any order. The male and female player to solve their equations the fastest wins, with the four other heat winners joining them in the Authority. The male and female who are dropped the fastest, or refuse to participate, are automatically sent to the Arena.
  - Winners: Brad & Kailah
- Side Tracked: Played in male and female heats, players begin with five pegs on their board. Throughout the challenge, they must run across a dirt track, collect a ring, and throw it onto an opponent's peg from behind a line. Players are eliminated from the challenge once they have one ring thrown on each of their pegs. The last player standing in each heat wins.
  - Winners: Mark & Sylvia
- Stacked: Played in male and female heats of seven. Players must scrape paint off a board to reveal a four-digit code and use the code to unlock one of five available stand-up paddleboards. They must then paddle to a platform, collect a set of puzzle pieces, and assemble the vertical puzzle at one of three available puzzle stations. Players are eliminated from the challenge if they cannot claim a paddle board or puzzle station in time. The first player in each heat to assemble their puzzle wins.
  - Winners: Brad & KellyAnne
- Shooting Stars: Played in male and female heats, players begin harnessed on a platform above water and are asked trivia questions one at a time. If they answer correctly, they can assign another player a strike, however answering incorrectly self-incurs a strike. Players are launched into the water and eliminated from the challenge once they receive three strikes. The last player standing in each heat wins.
  - Winners: Derrick & Veronica
- Flight Pattern: Played two players at a time, players begin harnessed out the side of a helicopter as it flies over a lagoon. They must memorize a nine-square pattern seen from above, release themselves into the water and swim to their puzzle station before replicating the pattern. The male and female player who correctly replicate the pattern, with the correct orientation, in the fastest time wins.
  - Winners: Jonna & Mark
- Wall of Fame: Throughout the season, the house contained a wall decorated with photos of this season’s contestants during a previous finale of The Challenge. Players must match the names of 24 contestants from this season to one of 24 questions about the photos. The order that players finish determines the teams for the first leg of the Final Challenge and the order they begin the leg.
  - Winners: Jonna & Wes

=== Arena games ===
- Crawl Brawl: Players start at opposite ends of a narrow caged tunnel. They must transfer six sandbags through the tunnel and drag them to their respective bell. The first player to transfer all six sandbags wins.
  - Played by: Cynthia vs. Tina, Syrus vs. Tyler
- Lights Out: Players begin tethered to opposite ends of a giant turnstile. The first player to reach a light switch and turn off a beam of light wins.
  - Played by: Laterrian vs. Mark
- Weight Up: Players begin inside a cage and must throw weighted sandbags into an overhead crate to lower the crate and reveal a section of dry wall. They must then smash through the dry wall using a hammer, escape the cage and ring a bell outside. The first player to ring the bell wins.
  - Played by: MJ vs. Syrus
- Steamroller: Players begin inside opposite sides of a cylindrical steel barrel. The first player to roll the barrel to their end of the platform wins.
  - Played by: Beth vs. Kendal, Darrell vs. Jordan
- Knock Off: Players begin on suspended on opposite ledges of a wall 30-feet above ground. The first player to knock their opponent off their ledge, by pushing circular pegs through the wall to their opponent’s side, wins.
  - Played by: Beth vs. Jonna, Wes vs. Yes
- Star Struck: Players must maneuver a pole through three star-shaped holes of a vertical maze to release the pole. Once released, they must use the pole to hit a ball through a small hole. The first player to hit their ball through the hole wins.
  - Played by: Derrick vs. MJ, Nia vs. Sylvia
- Pull Your Own Weight: Players must pull a weighted bag up a vertical tower to release a set of puzzle pieces. Once released, the first player to solve the puzzle wins.
  - Played by: Jonna vs. Roni, Jordan vs. Mark
- Light My Fire: Players begin at the center of the Arena with both hands on a metal pole. The first player to wrestle the pole from their opponent and ignite the pole at their cauldron at the boundary of the Arena wins.
  - Played by: Derrick vs. Nehemiah

=== Final Challenge ===
The final eight contestants were flown to San José Island for the Final Challenge.

Day one

Day one of the Final Challenge consists of two alternating portions: legs (racing from one checkpoint to the next) and checkpoints (competing in a head-to-head challenge against an opponent). During each leg, players race to the next checkpoint in male-female pairs. The first pair to reach each checkpoint receives 4 points each; second receives 3 points; third receives 2 points; fourth receives 1 point. At checkpoints, pairs are disbanded and players must select an opponent of the same gender to compete in the checkpoint against. The winner of each matchup receives 5 points while the loser receives none. The first, second, third and fourth-place players of each gender from the checkpoint are paired with the respective player of the opposite gender for the following leg.

Before commencing, it was announced that the players with the most Stars, Jonna and Nehemiah (5 stars each), would start the Final Challenge with 5 bonus points.

- First leg: Pairs race down a runway and collect a key before proceeding to the first checkpoint on a beach. For this leg only, teams are formed based on placements in the "Wall of Fame" challenge and depart in 30-second intervals in the same order.
- Checkpoint #1: Players use the key they collected to unlock wooden planks. They must use the planks to assemble a raft and paddle around a buoy before returning to shore. The first player in each matchup to return to shore wins.
- Second leg: Pairs race to a tandem bicycle and ride it through the jungle to the next checkpoint.
- Checkpoint #2: Players must run 400 metres (0.25 miles) to view and memorize an answer key consisting of four rows of nine colored stars. They must then return to their star sequence and determine which star in each row is different. The position of the different stars in each row forms the numbers to a four-digit code. The first player in each matchup to determine the code and use it to unlock a box wins.
- Third leg: Pairs race to a beach, enter a tandem kayak and paddle across the water to the next checkpoint.
- Checkpoint #3: Players begin on a floating platform. The first player to push their opponent off the platform and into the water in each matchup wins.
- Fourth leg: Pairs must transport 100 pounds of sandbags through the jungle to the next location.
- Overnight Stage: As a reward for progressing this far into the competition, it was announced players would spend the night sleeping on a yacht.

Day two

The following morning, it was announced that only six players would continue day two of the Final Challenge. The two players of each gender with the most points from day one would automatically advance while the remaining two players would compete against each other in an Instant Elimination for the final spot.

- Instant Elimination: Throughout the season, the house contained a map depicting the locations of each Final Challenge of The Challenge. Players must fill out a crossword with the names of ten countries depicted on the map, with the specific locations (Acapulco, Bocas Del Toro, Los Angeles, Mendoza, Oslo, Phuket, Pucón, Reykjavík, Rio de Janeiro and Whistler) given as clues. The first players to complete the crossword wins while the losers are eliminated.
  - Played by: Kailah vs. KellyAnne, Brad vs. Mark
  - Eliminated: KellyAnne and Mark
- Final leg: As individuals, players race through the jungle to the beach before finishing at the yacht from the Overnight Stage where a chest with the $500,000 is located. Along the way, they have to complete several challenges. At the first challenge, players must consume two pounds of various offal and insects before proceeding. At the second challenge, players must complete a pentagon-shaped puzzle before grabbing a surfboard and proceeding to the third challenge. At the third challenge, players must use wooden blocks to build a tower matching a given diagram. Once complete, players use their surfboard to paddle to the yacht offshore. The first player of each gender to reach the yacht are declared the winners of All Stars 3 and receive $250,000 each.
  - Winners: Jonna & Wes

== Game summary ==
Episode		Winners		Arena contestants		Arena game	Arena outcome	
#	Challenge	Sabotage	The Authority	Last-place	Winner's pick	Arena game	Winner	Eliminated
1	Tunnel Vision	Sylvia	KellyAnne, MJ, Sylvia, Veronica, Wes, Yes	Cynthia	Tina	Crawl Brawl	Tina	Cynthia
1	Tunnel Vision	Wes	KellyAnne, MJ, Sylvia, Veronica, Wes, Yes	Syrus	Tyler	Crawl Brawl	Syrus	Tyler
2	Out of Reach	Kendal	Brad, Jonna, Jordan, Kailah, Kendal, Yes	Tina	Melinda	Lights Out	—N/a	
2	Out of Reach	Yes	Brad, Jonna, Jordan, Kailah, Kendal, Yes	Laterrian	Mark	Lights Out	Mark	Laterrian
3 (Note: Due to Jemmye and Tina's departure from the competition, the female "Weight Up" elimination round between Kendal and Veronica was canceled and both players remained in the game.)	Playing Dirty	Kailah	Brad, Derrick, Jonna, Jordan, Kailah, Sylvia	Veronica	Kendal	Weight Up	—N/a	
3	Playing Dirty	Brad	Brad, Derrick, Jonna, Jordan, Kailah, Sylvia	MJ	Syrus	Weight Up	MJ	Syrus
4	High Stakes	Kailah	Brad, Jonna, Kailah, Mark, MJ, Veronica	Beth	Kendal	Steamroller	Beth	Kendal
4	High Stakes	Brad	Brad, Jonna, Kailah, Mark, MJ, Veronica	Darrell	Jordan	Steamroller	Jordan	Darrell
#	Challenge	Sabotage	The Authority	Winner's pick	Called-out	Arena game	Winner	Eliminated
5	Side Tracked	Sylvia	Mark, Sylvia	Jonna	Beth	Knock Off	Jonna	Beth
5	Side Tracked	Mark	Mark, Sylvia	Wes	Yes	Knock Off	Wes	Yes
6	Stacked	KellyAnne	Brad, KellyAnne	Sylvia	Nia	Star Struck	Nia	Sylvia
6	Stacked	Brad	Brad, KellyAnne	MJ	Derrick	Star Struck	Derrick	MJ
7	Shooting Stars		Derrick, Veronica	Jonna	Roni	Pull Your Own Weight	Jonna	Roni
7	Shooting Stars		Derrick, Veronica	Jordan	Mark	Pull Your Own Weight	Mark	Jordan
8/9	Flight Pattern		Jonna, Mark	Derrick	Nehemiah	Light My Fire	Nehemiah	Derrick
8/9	Flight Pattern		Jonna, Mark	Kailah	KellyAnne	Light My Fire	—N/a	
#	Challenge	Winners						
9	Wall of Fame	Jonna						
9	Wall of Fame	Wes						
9/10	Final Challenge	Jonna	2nd: Kailah; 3rd: Nia; 4th: KellyAnne					
9/10	Final Challenge	Wes	2nd: Brad; 3rd: Nehemiah; 4th: Mark					

=== Episode progress ===
Contestants	Episodes									
Contestants	1	2	3	4	5	6	7	8/9	9	Finale
Jonna	SAFE	HIGH	HIGH	HIGH	ELIM	SAFE	ELIM	WIN	WON	WINNER
Wes	WIN	SAFE	SAFE	SAFE	ELIM	SAFE	SAFE	SAFE	WON	WINNER
Brad	SAFE	HIGH	WIN	WIN	SAFE	WIN	SAFE	SAFE	SAFE	SECOND
Kailah	SAFE	HIGH	WIN	WIN	SAFE	SAFE	SAFE	SAVE	SAFE	SECOND
Nehemiah	SAFE	SAFE	SAFE	SAFE	SAFE	SAFE	SAFE	ELIM	SAFE	THIRD
Nia	SAFE	SAFE	SAFE	SAFE	SAFE	ELIM	SAFE	SAFE	SAFE	THIRD
KellyAnne	HIGH	SAFE	SAFE	SAFE	SAFE	WIN	SAFE	SAVE	SAFE	FOURTH
Mark	SAFE	ELIM	SAFE	HIGH	WIN	SAFE	ELIM	WIN	SAFE	FOURTH
Derrick	SAFE	SAFE	HIGH	SAFE	SAFE	ELIM	WIN	OUT		
Veronica	HIGH	SAFE	SAVE	HIGH	SAFE	SAFE	WIN	MED		
Jordan	SAFE	HIGH	HIGH	ELIM	SAFE	SAFE	OUT			
Roni	SAFE	SAFE	SAFE	SAFE	SAFE	SAFE	OUT			
MJ	HIGH	SAFE	ELIM	HIGH	SAFE	OUT				
Sylvia	WIN	SAFE	HIGH	SAFE	WIN	OUT				
Yes	HIGH	WIN	SAFE	SAFE	OUT					
Beth	—N/a			ELIM	QUIT					
Darrell	SAFE	SAFE	SAFE	OUT						
Kendal	SAFE	WIN	SAVE	OUT						
Syrus	ELIM	SAFE	OUT							
Jemmye	SAFE	SAFE	QUIT							
Tina	ELIM	SAVE	MED							
Laterrian	SAFE	OUT								
Melinda	SAFE	QUIT								
Tyler	OUT									
Cynthia	OUT									

Competition
The contestant won the Final Challenge
The contestant did not win the Final Challenge
The contestant was eliminated during the Final Challenge
The contestant won the challenge was part of the Authority
The contestant won the challenge and departed first in the First Leg of the Final Challenge
The contestant placed in the top three for the challenge and was part of the Authority
The contestant was not selected for the Arena
The contestant placed last in the daily challenge or was voted into the Arena, but did not have to compete
The contestant won the elimination in the Arena and received their opponent's Star(s)
The contestant lost in the Arena and was eliminated
The contestant withdrew from the competition
The contestant was removed from the competition due to medical reasons

=== Final Challenge scoreboard ===
Players competed to earn points during Day One of the Final Challenge to determine who would automatically progress to Day Two. The points system was discontinued for Day Two.

Contestants	Start	Leg/Checkpoint							Total	Placement
Contestants	Start	1		2		3		4	Total	Placement
Jonna	5	4	0	1	5	2	5	2	24	1st
Wes	0	4	5	4	5	1	0	3	22	1st
Nehemiah	5	3	5	2	0	3	0	1	19	2nd
Nia	0	1	5	2	5	1	5	4	23	2nd
Brad	0	1	0	3	5	2	5	2	18	3rd
Kailah	0	3	5	4	0	3	0	3	18	3rd
KellyAnne	0	2	0	3	0	4	0	1	10	4th
Mark	0	2	0	1	0	4	5	4	16	4th

== Sabotages ==
From episodes 1-6, the winners of daily challenges are awarded with the "Sabotage" which allows them to penalize another player (or themselves) with a disadvantage for the next episode's challenge.

Episode	Sabotage holder	Penalized	Disadvantage
1	Sylvia	KellyAnne	Players must wait one minute before they can begin solving their puzzle during the "Out of Reach" challenge
1	Wes	Jordan	Players must wait one minute before they can begin solving their puzzle during the "Out of Reach" challenge
2	Kendal	MJ	Players must wear a 35-pound weighted vest during the "Playing Dirty" challenge
2	Yes	Wes	Players must wear a 35-pound weighted vest during the "Playing Dirty" challenge
3	Brad	MJ	Players must wait one minute before they can begin solving their equation during the "High Stakes" challenge
3	Kailah	Kendal	Players must wait one minute before they can begin solving their equation during the "High Stakes" challenge
4	Brad	MJ	Players begin with a ring already placed on one of their pegs for the "Side Tracked" challenge
4	Kailah	Beth	Players begin with a ring already placed on one of their pegs for the "Side Tracked" challenge
5	Mark	MJ	Players must reveal an extra code to unlock a second lock before claiming a paddleboard during the "Stacked" challenge
5	Sylvia	Jonna	Players must reveal an extra code to unlock a second lock before claiming a paddleboard during the "Stacked" challenge
6	Brad	Brad	Players begin with one strike already assigned to them for the "Shooting Stars" challenge
6	KellyAnne	Veronica	Players begin with one strike already assigned to them for the "Shooting Stars" challenge

== Episodes ==
No. overall	No. in season	Title	Original release date
20	1	"An All Star Is Born"	May 11, 2022
21	2	"You've Been Sabotaged!"	May 11, 2022
22	3	"Treehouse of Horror"	May 18, 2022
23	4	"She's Back!"	May 25, 2022
24	5	"More Than Friends?"	June 1, 2022
25	6	"Revenge of the All Stars"	June 8, 2022
26	7	"Let's Make a Deal"	June 15, 2022
27	8	"Going Bananas"	June 22, 2022
28	9	"Cheater! Cheater!"	June 29, 2022
29	10	"Coming for the Crown"	July 6, 2022
