= Hole in the Wall (American game show) =

American game show

- Genre: Game show
- Directed by: Ron de Moraes (Fox); Rob George (Cartoon Network)
- Presented by: Brooke Burns; Mark Thompson; Teck Holmes
- Composers: Russ Landau; Simon Darlow
- Country of origin: United States
- Original language: English
- No. of seasons: 1 (Fox); 2 (Cartoon Network)
- No. of episodes: 18 (8 unaired) (Fox); 40 (Cartoon Network)

Production
- Executive producers: Stuart Krasnow (Fox); Scott St. John (Cartoon Network)
- Producers: Jon Peper; David Ruskey (game producer; Fox)
- Production location: Radford Studio Center
- Editor: Narumi Inatsugu
- Camera setup: John Perry
- Running time: 22 minutes
- Production company: FremantleMedia North America

Original release
- Network: Fox
- Release: September 7, 2008 – March 15, 2009
- Network: Cartoon Network
- Release: October 6, 2010 – January 19, 2012

Hole in the Wall is an American game show that has aired in two versions on American television.

The first version aired on the Fox television network from 2008 to 2009. The show was an adaptation of the Japanese game show Nōkabe (脳カベ) (meaning Brain Wall, nicknamed by YouTube fans as "Human Tetris") in which players must contort themselves to fit through cutouts in a large 13 feet (4.0 m) by 7.5 feet (2.3 m) Styrofoam wall moving towards them on a 50 feet (15 m) track. FremantleMedia North America produced the series. Brooke Burns and Fox announcer Mark Thompson were the hosts of this version. On May 20, 2008, Fox announced that it would commission 13 hours of Hole in the Wall from FremantleMedia North America. According to a Hollywood Reporter report, these hours could be split and aired as 26 episodes. Production began July 13, 2008, at CBS Studios-Radford.

== Broadcast ==
=== Cancellation ===
On March 17, 2009, Fox pulled the series again, replacing it with reruns of King of the Hill and American Dad! The program's cancellation was announced in May 2009.

=== Revival ===
On July 20, 2010, Cartoon Network announced that it picked up the series, now updated for its younger audience. FremantleMedia would return as the show's producers. The series premiered on October 6, 2010, with The Real World: Hawaii cast member Teck Holmes as host. Joining him as the show's lifeguard was model/lifeguard Emily Hedicke. A second cycle debuted in April 2011, and featured a new co-host, lifeguard Aaron Gingrich. On January 19, 2012, the CN version of Hole in the Wall aired its last episode.

== Fox version (2008–2009) ==
=== Game play ===
Two teams of three people play, with a hobby, occupation, or location as the team name. Two lifeguards, one male and one female, sit poolside. The contestants are dressed in the silver spandex zentai unitards and wear red or blue helmets, elbow pads, and knee pads depending on the team color.

A replay is shown each time the wall was passed and each time wall was not cleared, a diagram is shown of the best method.

One rule that is almost automatically assumed is that contestants must jump through the hole without breaking it all off or falling in the water. The rule that most players inadvertently break is that at least one foot must be in the play area.

==== Solo Wall ====
After each team is announced, the team captain is then instructed to enter the play area. After a three-second countdown, the wall is shown. If the captain fails to get through, or "clear" the wall, either by falling into the pool or damaging the wall as it passes, the team earns zero points, clearing the wall earns one point. The opposing team captain then tries a different wall.

==== Double Wall ====
The two non-captains on each team then complete on a Double Wall. The team earns two points if both players clear the wall, if either player fails to clear, they earn zero points.

==== Triple Wall ====
All three players try to complete the Triple Wall. The team scores three points if all three clear the wall. If any player fails to clear, the team earns zero points.

==== Speed Wall ====
Like Round 3, all three players complete. The wall moves twice as fast as before. Each player who clears the wall earns two points, for a maximum of six. In addition, if all three players clear the wall, they win a guaranteed $5,000 bonus whether they win or lose the game. Both teams get a chance to play for the $5,000, even if the second team has been mathematically eliminated.

The team with more points wins a guaranteed $25,000 and plays the final "Blind Wall" for extra cash at $100,000. In case of tie, both teams advanced to the tiebreaker and final "Blind Wall" with $50,000 at stake.

==== Blind Wall ====
One team member, blindfolded, is guided by Brooke to the center of the play area. The two remaining team members must then direct the blindfolded member through a standard solo wall by giving verbal commands, while the audience is asked to remain quiet. If the contestant clears the wall, the team wins $100,000. If both teams advance to the Blind Wall, the prize is split in half and each team tries a different blind wall for $50,000.

=== Broadcast history ===
On October 24, 2008, Fox pulled the series from its schedule, replacing it with reruns of Kitchen Nightmares. On January 21, 2009, Fox pulled the series again and replaced it with reruns of Are You Smarter than a 5th Grader? After an airing on February 8, 2009, the show was quickly put on hiatus. After another month, the series returned on March 8, 2009. Reruns of the series began airing on Fox Reality (now Nat Geo Wild) on May 25, 2009. The program's cancellation was announced in May 2009. Some episodes of the FOX version has since been made available on Amazon Prime Video.

== Cartoon Network version (2010–2012) ==
=== Game play ===
Two families of three members each play. One member of each team is a child, and the second member must be the child's parent or guardian. The third member can either be one of the child's friends/siblings or a second parent/guardian.

The rules are similar to the Fox version, but points are now awarded based on how many players clear each wall, meaning that it is no longer required for every member to clear a group wall. Each person who gets through the hole and matches the shape earns 10 points. The Speed Wall is played with two players and the points are doubled. Various wall variants were used throughout the show, such as requiring players to also get props through the wall or allowing the opposing team to interfere.

==== Tiebreaker Wall ====
One player from each team is chosen to play and are each given ten plastic balls. When the wall starts moving, the players must grab as many balls as possible, and clear the wall with the balls in their hand. The winner of the competition for the player's team is decided by whoever gets the most balls through their hole.

==== Impossiwall ====
Between one and three players of the winning team compete in the fifth round that has a final, more difficult wall, named the Impossiwall. If all players make it through, the winning team will be immortalized in the Wall of Fame.
