= Tyler Duckworth =

American television personality (1981/1982–2026)

- Born: 1981 or 1982; Atlanta, Georgia, U.S.
- Died: August 11, 2026 (aged 44); Grand Forks, North Dakota, U.S.
- Occupation: Television personality
- Television: The Real World: Key West

Tyler Duckworth (1981 or 1982 – August 11, 2026) was an American reality television personality who appeared on The Real World: Key West and multiple seasons of The Challenge.

== Early life ==
Duckworth was born in Atlanta in 1981 or 1982. He was raised in Minneapolis.

== Career ==
In addition to being a reality television personality, Duckworth was a middle school teacher.

== Personal life ==
Duckworth was openly gay. He had a passion for the Olympic Games. He also played many sports, including figure skating, gymnastics, long-distance running, and swimming.

Duckworth died in his Grand Forks, North Dakota residence on August 11, 2026, at the age of 44. Johnny Devenanzio paid tribute to Duckworth on social media, describing him as "the brother I never had".

== Filmography ==
- The Real World: Key West (2006)
- Real World/Road Rules Challenge: The Duel (2006)
- Real World/Road Rules Challenge: The Gauntlet III (2008)
- The Challenge: Cutthroat (2010)
- The Challenge: Rivals (2011)
- The Challenge: All Stars season 2 (2021)
- The Challenge: All Stars season 3 (2022)

== See also ==
- List of people from North Dakota
