= The Real World: Key West =

Coordinates: 24°35′15″N 81°44′17″W

- Season 17
- The cast of The Real World: Key West
- Starring: Svetlana Shusterman; Paula Meronek; Tyler Duckworth; Zach Mann; Jose Tapia; Janelle Casanave; John Devenanzio
- No. of episodes: 25

Release
- Original network: MTV
- Original release: February 28 – August 15, 2006

Season chronology
- ← Previous; The Real World: Austin Next → The Real World: Denver

The Real World: Key West is the seventeenth season of MTV's reality television series The Real World, which focuses on a group of diverse strangers living together for several months in a different city each season, as cameras follow their lives and interpersonal relationships. It is the second season of The Real World to be filmed in the South Atlantic States region of the United States, specifically in Florida after The Real World: Miami.

The season featured seven people and was shot in the Key Haven neighborhood of Key West, Florida from August to December 2005. It premiered on February 28, 2006, and consisted of 25 episodes. The season premiere was viewed by 3.33 million people.

In 2019, the season was made available for streaming on Facebook Watch (alongside the sixteenth and twenty-eighth seasons) ahead of The Real World: Atlanta's premiere.

== Production ==
The production faced a lawsuit by tourism mogul Ed Swift, a neighbor to the Driftwood Drive house, who sought to stop filming at the location, on the grounds that the production's floodlights, commercial-sized air conditioners, and outdoor cameras capable of rotating towards his house were a nuisance, and that local zoning laws prohibit commercial use of Key Haven homes. After MTV threatened to cancel production in response to the lawsuit, a judge threw out the lawsuit and allowed Bunim-Murray Productions to continue filming the season, with some minor production restrictions put in place.

During filming, Hurricane Rita made landfall, forcing the cast to evacuate to West Palm Beach. Subsequently, Wilma hit the area, forcing them to evacuate again, first to Ft. Lauderdale, and then to Orlando.

== Assignment ==
Almost every season of The Real World, beginning with its fifth season, has included the assignment of a season-long group job or task to the housemates, continued participation in which has been mandatory to remain part of the cast since the Back to New York season. The Key West cast was assigned to assist in starting a Mystic Tan franchise at the Pineapple Gallery. It closed briefly after Hurricane Wilma had devastated the store, and later reopened.

== The residence ==
The cast lived in a nearly 6,000-square-foot (560 m^{2}) Spanish Mediterranean-style, five bedroom, four and a half bathroom house at 32 Driftwood Drive in Key Haven, just north of the Key West city limits. The property spans 32,000 square feet (3,000 m^{2}) of waterfront property, and includes a tennis court, indoor racquetball court, gym, and an open dock. The house, which, along with two adjacent lots, was leased from June 28 to December 30, 2005, also included a 12-foot (3.7 m) x 20-foot (6.1 m) indoor pool that was converted into a sunken lounge area for filming. The house also included an outdoor pool. The house sustained some damage from Hurricane Wilma.

== Cast ==
Cast member	Age^{1}	Hometown
Zach Mann	22	Vashon Island, Washington
A communications grad from Lewis and Clark College, Zach comes from a Jewish family. Zach was at one time overweight, but has since transformed himself and emerged as an energetic, confident young man. He angers Svetlana when he informs her that he would also like to apply for team leader of Mystic Tan. At the reunion show, all of the castmates laughingly point to Zach when asked who "got the most booty."
Jose Tapia	20	Brooklyn, New York
Known to his friends as "The Don." He was raised in Brooklyn surrounded by drugs, violence, and the influence of "the wrong crowd". During the season, viewers learn that while living in Key West he is in the process of moving out of an apartment he shares with his former girlfriend. He attended Florida State University, and is the owner of multiple rental properties and the holder of a real estate broker license.
Paula Meronek	23	Meriden, Connecticut
Since her graduation from Quinnipiac University, Paula is a corporate employee by day, and parties at night. Paula is still experiencing problems with an abusive ex-boyfriend, and with her body image.
John Devenanzio	22	Fullerton, California
A recent graduate of Pennsylvania State University, his casting made headlines in the Daily Collegian, PSU's student newspaper. During this season and onward throughout numerous challenges, he was appointed as "Johnny Bananas". He initially flirts with Svetlana but she remains faithful to her boyfriend at home. At one point during the season, he jokingly removes Janelle's bikini top in the ocean. Concerned about being asked to leave the house, he apologizes to Janelle and she accepts but not without reprimand. He and Tyler share a relationship characterized by numerous practical jokes they play on one another.
Janelle Casanave	23	San Jose, California
Friends describe her as "independent." She was accepted to the University of San Francisco School of Law, but before becoming a lawyer, is launching a career as a makeup artist. In 2008, Janelle later appeared on The Real World: Hollywood, in which she dates cast member William Gilbert.
Tyler Duckworth	23	Minneapolis, Minnesota
A gay gymnastics and figure skating enthusiast who describes himself as "manipulative" and "mischievous". At one time, he was on track to becoming a world-class swimming champion, until a freak accident that nearly took away his ability to walk shattered his Olympic dreams. A recent graduate of Tufts University, he must decide what to do with his life. In the show, he admits to feeling the closest to Jose in the house.
Svetlana Shusterman	19	Richboro, Pennsylvania
Svetlana is a pre-med student at Temple University who was born to a Jewish family in Odesa, Ukraine. A first generation immigrant with a reputation for being the "crazy Russian chick," she is torn between her dependency on her family, and the need to venture out and experience life. During this season and her only challenge season, she was nicknamed as "Svitz". In 2007, her 21st birthday was featured on MTV's My Super Sweet 16.

^Note 1: Age at the time of filming.

== Episodes ==
No. overall	No. in season	Title	Original release date
364	1	"Welcome to Key West"	February 28, 2006
The seven housemates come to Key West after waiting out Hurricane Katrina in separate locations. Paula tells the girls she thinks all of the guys are attractive. John and Zach are drawn to Svetlana, who has a boyfriend.
365	2	"Roommate Anxiety"	March 7, 2006
The roommates try to have a little fun before their job starts. The roommates believe that Paula has an eating disorder. John comments about Paula's weight causing her to confide in Zach about her insecurities. She appears to experience an anxiety attack and Janelle and Svetlana calm her down.
366	3	"Club Hoppin"	March 14, 2006
Tyler introduces the others to Key West's gay nightlife, but John prefers chasing girls. The roommates urge Paula to get help dealing with her issues.
367	4	"Svetlana's Tough Times"	March 21, 2006
The roommates prepare to open the tanning salon. Tyler doesn't want to work with Svetlana, who he says is immature and irritating.
368	5	"Troubled Waters"	March 28, 2006
Svetlana has a spat with her boyfriend and considers dumping him for John.
369	6	"No Friends of Mine"	April 4, 2006
Svetlana wants to manage the tanning salon, but she gets competition for the job from Zach.
370	7	"Zach Steps It Up"	April 11, 2006
The looming deadline for the store is causing everyone's true personalities to shine and conflict.
371	8	"John's Got Game"	April 18, 2006
John brings home two women, and Jose ends up being his wingman. Paula reveals a startling secret about her ex-boyfriend.
372	9	"John and Paula's Fight"	April 25, 2006
Hurricane Rita spoils the housemates plans for the opening of their tanning salon. Paula interferes with John's date, and he calls her a lesbian.
373	10	"Gettin' Stormy"	May 2, 2006
Hurricane Rita's arrival forces the roommates to evacuate to West Palm Beach, where they have fun partying until John and Tyler start arguing about John's insensitive remarks regarding gay people.
374	11	"Clarification"	May 9, 2006
Paula knows she has issues but is afraid of going to therapy, and Zach begins a relationship with a local.
375	12	"Tyler's Night of Fun"	May 16, 2006
Tyler has a one-night stand with a hottie, who Svetlana doesn't think is gay, but starts to wonder if her boyfriend is.
376	13	"Opening Day"	May 23, 2006
The roommates open the tanning salon, and Paula is angry at John for sleeping on the job.
377	14	"Janelle and Jose's Fight"	May 30, 2006
Janelle questions Jose's work ethic, and he doesn't take kindly to her remarks.
378	15	"The Burn Book"	June 6, 2006
Svetlana tells John about Tyler talking trash behind his back. They make up and make a burn book against Svetlana. A possible visit by Paula's abusive ex-boyfriend causes a reaction among the roommates.
379	16	"Zach's Girl Trouble"	June 13, 2006
Zach is torn between three women at once. Svetlana goes home to be with her boyfriend, Martin, after hearing his father is terminally ill.
380	17	"Let's Get Physical"	June 20, 2006
John and Tyler work on a float for Fantasy Fest as a hurricane approaches. Janelle is cross with John after he jokingly removes her top.
381	18	"Hurricane Wilma"	June 20, 2006
Hurricane Wilma forces the roommates to evacuate to Fort Lauderdale, but the storm follows them.
382	19	"Wake of the Storm"	June 27, 2006
The roomies return to Key West and survey the hurricane's impact on their house and business. Svetlana gets angry with Tyler when she finds the burn book.
383	20	"Spanish Getaway"	July 11, 2006
The roommates vacation in Spain, and John's out every night cruising for girls. Meanwhile, Svetlana is mad at Tyler and Janelle, so she mopes in her room.
384	21	"Jose Gets Stranded"	July 18, 2006
Tyler obsesses over arranging a publicity visit with Olympic gold-medal-winning swimmer Amanda Beard, causing friction with the other roommates and an argument with John.
385	22	"Relationships"	July 25, 2006
When Janelle's ex-boyfriend Kasib visits, the couple get into a fight and he's thrown out of the house with nowhere to go.
386	23	"Regaining the Pace"	August 1, 2006
Tyler plans to run a marathon, but only wants Jose, Paula and Zach to be there in person to cheer him on, which offends the others in the house.
387	24	"Svetlana's Birthday"	August 8, 2006
Svetlana's looking forward to her boyfriend visiting for her birthday, but she doesn't know that Tyler is planning a surprise for her. And as Paula's therapy ends, she reflects on how she's changed.
388	25	"Time To Say Goodbye"	August 15, 2006
The roommates bid farewell to each other and Key West. After being postponed by Hurricane Wilma, the roommates finally go to Fantasy Fest and enter costume contests. John ends up encountering trouble with the gang's parade float.

== After filming ==
After the cast left the Real World house, all seven of them appeared to discuss their experiences both during and since their time on the show, Fun, Sun, and Now Totally Done: The Real World Key West Reunion which premiered on August 22, 2006, and was hosted by Susie Castillo.

At the 2008 The Real World Awards Bash, Svetlana won the title of "Hottest Female" and Johnny was named "Hottest Male". Other nominees included Paula for "Best Meltdown" and for "Best Phonecall Gone Bad", and Tyler for "Roommate you Love to Hate", "Best Dance-Off" and for "Steamiest Scene" alongside Bhakti.

In 2006, Paula Meronek was arrested for assault for allegedly biting then-boyfriend John Alyward. In April, 2014, she married Jack Beckert and gave birth to three babies: Atlas (born in 2014), Athena Rose (born in 2015) and Aurora Mae (born in 2019).

Svetlana Shusterman became an aspiring actress and model who appeared in FHM as one of the "Girls of FHM". In 2007 she was arrested for disorderly conduct. In March 2014, Shusterman filed a restraining order against Incubus frontman Brandon Boyd. Boyd responded that he did not know her, and did not recall having ever met her.

Janelle Casanave got married on June 13, 2015.

In 2011, Devenanzio alleged in a lawsuit that the TV series Entourage damaged his name and personality and caused him emotional distress by featuring a character named "Johnny Bananas", played by Kevin Dillon. One year later, the judge ruled in HBO's favor. In 2017, he appeared on Fear Factor alongside Leroy Garrett from The Real World: Las Vegas. In 2018, he started hosting 1st Look, a late-night travel series on NBC. In 2020, Devenanzio competed in season 19 of Worst Cooks in America. Devenanzio subsequently hosted another late-night NBC show, Celebrity Sleepover, which premiered on April 3, 2021. Devenanzio also competed on the first season of House of Villains, and on the second season of The Traitors.

Tyler Duckworth passed away on August 11, 2026 at the age of 44 at his home in North Dakota.

=== The Challenge ===
Cast member	Seasons of The Challenge	Other appearances
Zach Mann	The Gauntlet III	—N/a
Jose Tapia	—N/a	—N/a
Paula Meronek	The Duel, The Inferno 3, The Gauntlet III, The Island, The Duel II, Fresh Meat II, Cutthroat (2010), Rivals, Battle of the Exes, Rivals II	—N/a
John Devenanzio	The Duel, The Inferno 3, The Gauntlet III, The Island, The Ruins, Cutthroat (2010), Rivals, Battle of the Exes, Rivals II, Free Agents, Battle of the Exes II, Battle of the Bloodlines, Rivals III, Invasion of the Champions, XXX: Dirty 30, Vendettas, Final Reckoning, War of the Worlds, War of the Worlds 2, Total Madness, Ride or Dies, Battle of the Eras, Vets & New Threats, Cutthroat (2026)	The Challenge: Champs vs. Pros, The Challenge: Champs vs. Stars (season 1), The Challenge: World Championship, The Challenge: USA (season 2)
Janelle Casanave	The Inferno 3, The Gauntlet III	The Challenge: All Stars (season 2), The Challenge: All Stars (season 4)
Svetlana Shusterman	The Duel	—N/a
Tyler Duckworth	The Duel, The Gauntlet III, Cutthroat (2010), Rivals	The Challenge: All Stars (season 2), The Challenge: All Stars (season 3)

Note: Paula appeared on the 2010 MTV special Spring Break Challenge as a commentator
