= Duelist =

Duelist or duellist may refer to:

- A person who participates in a duel
- The Duellists, a 1977 film directed by Ridley Scott
- Duelist (2005 film), a 2005 film directed by Lee Myung-se
- The Duelist (2016 film), a 2016 film directed by Alexey Mizgirev
- The Duelist (magazine), a magazine published by Wizards of the Coast
- "The Duelist", a song by Sabaton from the 2025 album Legends
- Duelyst, a 2016 video game developed by Counterplay Games
- Duelist, a Yu-Gi-Oh! Trading Card Game player
- Skirmisher, or Duelist, a Dungeon Fighter Online character subclass

== See also ==
- Duel (disambiguation)
- Dualism (disambiguation)
