= Deuel County =

Deuel County is the name of two counties in the United States:

- Deuel County, Nebraska: named for Harry Porter Deuel, a long time railroad official who resided in Omaha, NE
- Deuel County, South Dakota: named for Jacob S. Deuel, a pioneer and sawmill operator in the Dakota Territory
