= Real World/Road Rules Challenge: The Duel II =

17th season of the reality television series

Coordinates: 44.977339°S 168.783243°E

The Duel II
- Season 17
- Presented by: T. J. Lavin
- No. of contestants: 28
- Winners: Evan Starkman; Rachel Robinson
- Location: Queenstown, New Zealand
- No. of episodes: 12 (Special & Reunion Included)

Release
- Original network: MTV
- Original release: April 8 – June 17, 2009

Season chronology
- ← Previous; The Island Next → The Ruins

Real World/Road Rules Challenge: The Duel II is the 17th season of the MTV reality game show, The Challenge (at the time known as Real World/Road Rules Challenge).

The Duel II is the sequel to the show's 13th season, The Duel. It took place in Queenstown, New Zealand, with cast members from The Real World and Road Rules competing alongside cast members from Real World/Road Rules Challenge: Fresh Meat. The season premiered on Wednesday, April 8, 2009, and concluded on June 17, 2009, with the reunion special.

== Format ==
The Duel II follows the same format as the original Duel challenge, with the main difference being that each round of play features a male and female elimination. The specific differences are as follows following differences:

- The male and female winners of the main challenge are both immune to entering the Duel. Together, the winners start the selection and must agree on one person (regardless of gender) to potentially save from the Duel. The first person chosen then selects a player of the opposite gender, and so forth.
- The last male and female cast member that are not chosen have to compete in the Duel, select a competitor of their respective gender to go against them, and randomly select from one of five cards to determine the Duel game, in which the players compete.
- Unlike the original Duel season, there is a period of deliberation between the end of the challenge and the selection of the contestants for the elimination game.

At the end of the season, six contestants compete in the final challenge — three of each gender. First-place wins $100,000, second-place wins $35,000 and third-place wins $15,000.

== Contestants ==
| Male contestants | Original season | Finish |
|---|---|---|
| Evan Starkman | Real World/Road Rules Challenge: Fresh Meat | Winner |
| Brad Fiorenza | The Real World: San Diego | Runner-up |
| Mark Long | Road Rules: USA – The First Adventure | Third place |
| Landon Lueck | The Real World: Philadelphia | Episode 10 |
| MJ Garrett (Note: Before any challenges took place, Adam and CT were both disqualified from the competition after they engaged in a physical altercation. MJ and Nehemiah were brought in as replacements.) | The Real World: Philadelphia | Episode 10 |
| Derek McCray | Road Rules 2007: Viewers' Revenge | Episode 8 |
| Dunbar Merrill | The Real World: Sydney | Episode 7 |
| Eric Banks | Real World/Road Rules Challenge: Fresh Meat | Episode 6 |
| Isaac Stout | The Real World: Sydney | Episode 5 |
| Nehemiah Clark | The Real World: Austin | Episode 4 |
| Davis Mallory | The Real World: Denver | Episode 3 |
| Ryan Kehoe | Real World/Road Rules Challenge: Fresh Meat | Episode 2 |
| Nick Brown | The Real World: Hollywood | Episode 1 |
| Adam King | The Real World: Paris | Episode 1 |
| Chris "CT" Tamburello | The Real World: Paris | Episode 1 |

| Female contestants | Original season | Finish |
|---|---|---|
| Rachel Robinson | Road Rules: Campus Crawl | Winner |
| Brittini Sherrod | The Real World: Hollywood | Runner-up |
| Aneesa Ferreira | The Real World: Chicago | Third place |
| Diem Brown | Real World/Road Rules Challenge: Fresh Meat | Episode 10 |
| Tori Hall | Road Rules 2007: Viewers' Revenge | Episode 10 |
| Jenn Grijalva | The Real World: Denver | Episode 8 |
| Paula Meronek | The Real World: Key West | Episode 7 |
| Kimberly Alexander | The Real World: Hollywood | Episode 6 |
| Ruthie Alcaide | The Real World: Hawaii | Episode 5 |
| Katie Doyle | Road Rules: The Quest | Episode 4 |
| Brooke LaBarbera | The Real World: Denver | Episode 3 |
| Robin Hibbard | The Real World: San Diego | Episode 2 |
| Shauvon Torres | The Real World: Sydney | Episode 1/2 |

== Gameplay ==
=== Challenge games ===
- Last Man Standing: This challenge involves playing rugby within a large field. First, players are separated into two teams of six — guys vs. guys and girls vs. girls. Due to the odd number of players at the beginning of the challenge (13 of each gender), one guy and one girl is chosen to sit out the first phase of the challenge and be exempt from Duel selection, but can enter the challenge at the second phase. In the first phase, each same-gender team starts out facing each other on opposite sides, and the team that transfers a rugby ball to the end zone wins the first phase, while the losing team is eliminated. The players who sat out the first phase (Brad & Paula) enter the challenge in the second phase, and are designated as tacklers. If a player on offense gets tackled to the ground, that player switches to defense, and has to tackle one player on the offensive side, and the process continues until the last player not tackled crosses the finish line, winning the challenge.
  - Winners: Evan & Robin
- Freezing as Puck: Players are teamed up into male/female pairs, in two teams of six pairs, with the challenge played in three rounds. The female player sits "Indian style" on an oversize block of ice, or "puck," inside an ice rink, while their male partner has to push them from one end of the rink toward one of two numbered targets on the ice, and accumulate five or ten points for their team, depending on how far the "puck" travels. The catch: Each player is wearing speedos and bikinis. A pair is disqualified if the female player sitting on the puck makes any contact with the ice, or falls off the puck prior to reaching a numbered target on the other side. The team that accumulates the most points wins the first round, while the losing team is eliminated. The winning team from the first round then splits up into two teams of three pairs, where the aforementioned process continues until a team of three pairs wins the second phase. In the third phase, the three pairs who win phase two will compete for themselves. If a tie occurs between two teams in the third phase, a tiebreaker is held in which distance, not points, will be the determining factor as to which pair wins the entire challenge.
  - Winners: Mark & Rachel
- All Shook Up: Players have to hang on to a pair of parallel ropes that are stretched out over a muddy pit, and have to shake their opponents off the ropes. The challenge is played in multiple rounds — guys vs. guys and girls vs. girls — with the winners of the first three rounds advancing to the final round. The last player standing on the ropes wins the challenge.
  - Winners: Landon & Ruthie
- Luging My Mind: Played in male/female pairs, each pair has to race up and down a luge course to solve a puzzle, while wearing oversize replica bobbleheads of themselves that resemble lamp shades. To start, the guys race up the course to the top, and have to ride back down in a luge car to the bottom of the course, where their female partners will repeat the process. Once the girls meet their male partners at the bottom, each pair will team up, and race to solve a puzzle. The first team to solve their puzzle wins.
  - Winners: Landon & Brittini
- Don't Let Go: A swing is suspended 360 feet in a canyon over the Shotover River. Players are teamed up into male/female pairs, with the girls harnessed from a swing and their male partners harnessed from a platform hanging from the edge of a cliff. Once the swing mechanisms are released, the guys have to hang on to their female partners with their hands for as long as possible, before the girls are eventually swung 200 feet downward in the form of a bungee jumping contest. The team that hangs on for the longest time wins.
  - Winners: Mark & Rachel
- Dangle Duo: Played in male/female pairs, each pair has to climb up a 100-foot ladder suspended from a platform hanging above the Kowhai River, and raise a flag to the top with a rope. A team is disqualified is one or both players fall off the ladder or do not raise a flag within a 20-minute time limit. The team that raises a flag in the fastest time wins.
  - Winners: Landon & Brittini
- Burnt: The challenge is played in separate rounds — male and female. A structure is suspended from a platform hanging 30 feet above a lake, with a pulley system and seven flags attached to barrels on the lake's shore. Each player is hanging from the top of the structure, and has to pull on their designated rope as fast as possible, which will send their flag toward their own barrel. Once six out of seven flags have reached the barrel, the one remaining barrel will explode, dropping the player attached to the barrel into the water. The process continues until the last player hanging wins.
  - Winners: Landon & Brittini
- Upside Downer: A rope platform is suspended from a structure high above the Kowhai River, and players have to swing upside down from ropes from one side of the platform to the other, and collect as many Māori carvings as possible within a 10-minute limit. A player is disqualified if he/she does not make it to the end of the platform within 10 minutes. The player that collects each carving in the fastest time wins.
  - Winners: Landon & Rachel
- Spelling Air: A platform is suspended from a structure above Lake Johnson, and players are hanging 100 feet above the water from the top of the platform. Each player is asked to spell a word. A player is dropped into the water and disqualified if he/she misspells a word. The process continues until the last player hanging wins.
  - Winners: Evan & Rachel

=== Duel games ===
- The Elevator: The competitors are placed in two separate cages with a pulling chain inside. Each competitor must pull the chain that is inside of his/her cage, and with each pull, the opponent's cage is raised. The competitor whose cage reaches the top first loses.
  - Played by: Ryan vs. Nick, Evan vs. Nehemiah, MJ vs. Dunbar and Aneesa vs. Tori
- Back Off: Each competitor has a hook attached to his/her back. The challenger must take the hook off of the opponent's back and place it on a ring on at the side of the arena. The first challenger to successfully hook his/her opponent's hook to the ring twice wins the challenge.
  - Played by: Aneesa vs. Shauvon, Brittini vs. Brooke, Kimberly vs. Ruthie, Aneesa vs. Paula and Brad vs. Landon
- Duel Pole Dancing: A totem pole-like structure is located in the center of the arena. Around the outside of the pole are climbing holds for the competitors to use to make their ascent. The first competitor to reach the top of the pole and ring a bell wins the challenge.
  - Played by: Kimberly vs. Robin, Derek vs. Eric and Brad vs. MJ
- Push Over: There is a large wooden plank placed on the ground. This Duel is won by knocking a challenger off the plank twice.
  - Played by: MJ vs. Ryan, Jenn vs. Katie, Jenn vs. Kimberly, Diem vs. Jenn and Brittini vs. Diem
- Spot On: There are two rock-climbing walls, one for each challenger. There is a pattern that is designed on each wall. The pattern is not complete, though, and each challenger must use the pieces given to them in order to complete the pattern. The first challenger to complete the pattern wins.
  - Played by: Evan vs. Davis, Landon vs. Isaac and Evan vs. Derek

=== Final challenge ===
The final challenge begins with each player riding on a jet boat, and each player jumping off the boat when it stops in the middle of the river. Each player has to cross from one side of a river to another using a rope. The remainder of the course involves checkpoints reminiscent of each duel elimination. After crossing a river, each player has to run up a steep hill to the first checkpoint, "Spot On," in which each player has to complete a puzzle. The second checkpoint is based on "Duel Pole Dancing," in which each player has to shimmy their way up to the top of a pole in order to unlock a mountain bike. Each player then rides their bike up a mountain side to the third checkpoint, "Back Off." Players have to chain themselves to an iron ring, and have to team up with a player of the opposite gender of their choice. Each pair then advances to the "Push Over" checkpoint, in which players have to push a sled filled with dirt across a line, and remove the dirt to make the sled lighter. Each player then retrieves a key from under the sled's original spot in order to unlock themselves from the metal rings from the previous checkpoint. The final checkpoint is "The Elevator," in which each player has to elevate themselves to the top of "The Duel" structure to retrieve a Māori carving, then sprint to the finish line, where the first-place finishers win $100,000, the second-place finishers win $35,000 and third-place finishers win $15,000.

- Winners: Evan and Rachel
- Second place: Brad and Brittini
- Third place: Mark and Aneesa

== Game summary ==
| Episode | | Winners | Duel contestants | | Duel game | Duel outcome | |
| # | Challenge | Winners | Voted In | Called Out | Duel game | Winner | Eliminated |
|---|---|---|---|---|---|---|---|
| 1/2 | Last Man Standing (Note: Due to the odd number of contestants in the first round of the "Last Man Standing" challenge, Brad and Paula were each selected for immunity from the first Duel.) | Evan | Ryan | Nick | The Elevator | Ryan | Nick |
| 1/2 | Last Man Standing | Robin | Shauvon | Aneesa | Back Off | Aneesa | Shauvon |
| 2 | Freezing as Puck | Mark & Rachel | Robin | Kimberly | Duel Pole Dancing | Kimberly | Robin |
| 2 | Freezing as Puck | Mark & Rachel | MJ | Ryan | Push Over | MJ | Ryan |
| 3 | All Shook Up | Ruthie | Brooke | Brittini | Back Off | Brittini | Brooke |
| 3 | All Shook Up | Landon | Davis | Evan | Spot On | Evan | Davis |
| 4 | Luging My Mind | Landon & Brittini | Nehemiah | Evan | The Elevator | Evan | Nehemiah |
| 4 | Luging My Mind | Landon & Brittini | Jenn | Katie | Push Over | Jenn | Katie |
| 5 | Don't Let Go | Mark & Rachel | Isaac | Landon | Spot On | Landon | Isaac |
| 5 | Don't Let Go | Mark & Rachel | Ruthie | Kimberly | Back Off | Kimberly | Ruthie |
| 6 | Dangle Duo | Landon & Brittini | Derek | Eric | Duel Pole Dancing | Derek | Eric |
| 6 | Dangle Duo | Landon & Brittini | Kimberly | Jenn | Push Over | Jenn | Kimberly |
| 7 | Burnt | Landon | Dunbar | MJ | The Elevator | MJ | Dunbar |
| 7 | Burnt | Brittini | Paula | Aneesa | Back Off | Aneesa | Paula |
| 8 | Upside Downer | Landon | Derek | Evan | Spot On | Evan | Derek |
| 8 | Upside Downer | Rachel | Jenn | Diem | Push Over | Diem | Jenn |
| 9/10 | Spelling Air | Rachel | Aneesa | Tori | The Elevator | Aneesa | Tori |
| 9/10 | Spelling Air | Evan | MJ | Brad | Duel Pole Dancing | Brad | MJ |
| 10 | —N/a (Note: In Episode 10, no challenge or Duel selection was held. Instead, the players had to decide who would compete in the final Duel. No player had immunity. Landon and Diem were voted into the Duel by the other players and challenged Brad and Brittini to the final Duel, respectively. The previous duel winners, Aneesa and Brad picked the cards for the final duels .) | | Landon | Brad | Back Off | Brad | Landon |
| 10 | —N/a | | Diem | Brittini | Push Over | Brittini | Diem |
| 10 | Final Challenge | Rachel | 2nd place: Brittini; 3rd place: Aneesa | | | | |
| 10 | Final Challenge | Evan | 2nd place: Brad; 3rd place: Mark | | | | |

=== Elimination progress ===
| Contestants | Challenges | | | | | | | | | | |
| Contestants | 1/2 | 2 | 3 | 4 | 5 | 6 | 7 | 8 | 9/10 | 10 | Finale |
|---|---|---|---|---|---|---|---|---|---|---|---|
| Evan | WIN | SAFE | ELIM | ELIM | SAFE | SAFE | SAFE | ELIM | WIN | SAFE | WINNER |
| Rachel | SAFE | WIN | SAFE | SAFE | WIN | SAFE | SAFE | WIN | WIN | SAFE | WINNER |
| Brad | SAVE | SAFE | SAFE | SAFE | SAFE | SAFE | SAFE | SAFE | ELIM | ELIM | SECOND |
| Brittini | SAFE | SAFE | ELIM | WIN | SAFE | WIN | WIN | SAFE | SAFE | ELIM | SECOND |
| Aneesa | ELIM | SAFE | SAFE | SAFE | SAFE | SAFE | ELIM | SAFE | ELIM | SAFE | THIRD |
| Mark | SAFE | WIN | SAFE | SAFE | WIN | SAFE | SAFE | SAFE | SAFE | SAFE | THIRD |
| Diem | SAFE | SAFE | SAFE | SAFE | SAFE | SAFE | SAFE | ELIM | SAFE | OUT | |
| Landon | SAFE | SAFE | WIN | WIN | ELIM | WIN | WIN | WIN | SAFE | OUT | |
| MJ | SAFE | ELIM | SAFE | SAFE | SAFE | SAFE | ELIM | SAFE | OUT | | |
| Tori | SAFE | SAFE | SAFE | SAFE | SAFE | SAFE | SAFE | SAFE | OUT | | |
| Jenn | SAFE | SAFE | SAFE | ELIM | SAFE | ELIM | SAFE | OUT | | | |
| Derek | SAFE | SAFE | SAFE | SAFE | SAFE | ELIM | SAFE | OUT | | | |
| Paula | SAVE | SAFE | SAFE | SAFE | SAFE | SAFE | OUT | | | | |
| Dunbar | SAFE | SAFE | SAFE | SAFE | SAFE | SAFE | OUT | | | | |
| Kimberly | SAFE | ELIM | SAFE | SAFE | ELIM | OUT | | | | | |
| Eric | SAFE | SAFE | SAFE | SAFE | SAFE | OUT | | | | | |
| Ruthie | SAFE | SAFE | WIN | SAFE | OUT | | | | | | |
| Isaac | SAFE | SAFE | SAFE | SAFE | OUT | | | | | | |
| Katie | SAFE | SAFE | SAFE | OUT | | | | | | | |
| Nehemiah | SAFE | SAFE | SAFE | OUT | | | | | | | |
| Davis | SAFE | SAFE | OUT | | | | | | | | |
| Brooke | SAFE | SAFE | OUT | | | | | | | | |
| Ryan | ELIM | OUT | | | | | | | | | |
| Robin | WIN | OUT | | | | | | | | | |
| Shauvon | OUT | | | | | | | | | | |
| Nick | OUT | | | | | | | | | | |
| Adam | DQ | | | | | | | | | | |
| CT | DQ | | | | | | | | | | |

The contestant won the final challenge
The contestant did not win the final challenge
The contestant won the challenge
The contestant won the Duel
The contestant was exempt from Duel selection
The contestant lost the Duel and was eliminated
The contestant was disqualified from the competition due to disciplinary reasons

=== Selection process ===
Episodes
| 1 | 2 | 3 | 4 | 5 | 6 | 7 | 8 | 9 | 10 |
|---|---|---|---|---|---|---|---|---|---|
| Evan & Robin | Mark & Rachel | Landon & Ruthie | Landon & Brittini | Mark & Rachel | Landon & Brittini | Landon & Brittini | Landon & Rachel | Evan & Rachel | Aneesa |
| MJ | Aneesa | Brittini | Rachel | Landon | Mark | Brad | Mark | Mark | Brad |
| Katie | Landon | Mark | Mark | Brittini | Rachel | Tori | Brittini | Diem | Brittini |
| Eric | Brittini | Rachel | Tori | Evan | Brad | Mark | Brad | Brad | Diem |
| Tori | Brad | Brad | Brad | Diem | Tori | Rachel | Tori | Tori | Evan |
| Mark | Tori | Tori | Diem | Brad | Evan | Evan | Evan | Landon | Landon |
| Rachel | Evan | MJ | Evan | Tori | Diem | Diem | Diem | Brittini | Mark |
| Dunbar | Paula | Aneesa | Aneesa | MJ | MJ | MJ | MJ | MJ | Rachel |
| Diem | Dunbar | Isaac | MJ | Aneesa | Aneesa | Aneesa | Aneesa | Aneesa | |
| Landon | Diem | Katie | Kimberly | Eric | Eric | Derek | Derek | | |
| Brittini | Ryan | Eric | Derek | Jenn | Jenn | Jenn | Jenn | | |
| Derek | Jenn | Diem | Katie | Derek | Dunbar | Dunbar | | | |
| Kimberly | Nehemiah | Evan | Eric | Kimberly | Paula | Paula | | | |
| Nick | Brooke | Kimberly | Ruthie | Dunbar | Derek | | | | |
| Aneesa | Davis | Derek | Isaac | Paula | Kimberly | | | | |
| Isaac | Kimberly | Jenn | Paula | Isaac | | | | | |
| Ruthie | Derek | Nehemiah | Dunbar | Ruthie | | | | | |
| Nehemiah | Katie | Paula | Jenn | | | | | | |
| Brooke | Eric | Dunbar | Nehemiah | | | | | | |
| Davis | Ruthie | Brooke | | | | | | | |
| Jenn | Isaac | Davis | | | | | | | |
| Ryan | Robin | | | | | | | | |
| Shauvon | MJ | | | | | | | | |

These contestants won the Challenge, and had immunity from the Duel. Both contestants started the selection process
The contestant was selected to go into the Duel by the contestant at the end of the selection process
The contestant was at the end of the selection process, and automatically was sent into the Duel

== Teams ==
Last Man Standing (Ep. 1)
| Guys | | Girls | |
| Colors | Black | Colors | Black |
|---|---|---|---|
| Eric | Davis | Aneesa | Brooke |
| Evan | Derek | Brittini | Diem |
| Mark | Dunbar | Katie | Jenn |
| MJ | Isaac | Rachel | Kimberly |
| Nick | Landon | Robin | Shauvon |
| Ryan | Nehemiah | Ruthie | Tori |

Freezing as Puck (Ep. 2)
| Round 1 | | Round 2 | |
| Team 1 | Team 2 | Team 1 | Team 2 |
|---|---|---|---|
| Brooke & Nehemiah | Aneesa & Eric | Aneesa & Eric | Brad & Tori |
| Davis & Ruthie | Brad & Tori | Evan & Paula | Brittini & Landon |
| Derek & Kimberly | Brittini & Landon | MJ & Robin | Mark & Rachel |
| Diem & Dunbar | Evan & Paula | | |
| Isaac & Katie | Mark & Rachel | | |
| Jenn & Ryan | MJ & Robin | | |

Luging My Mind (Ep. 4)
| Aneesa & MJ |
| Brad & Tori |
| Brittini & Landon |
| Derek & Kimberly |
| Diem & Evan |
| Dunbar & Paula |
| Eric & Katie |
| Isaac & Ruthie |
| Jenn & Nehemiah |
| Mark & Rachel |

Don't Let Go (Ep. 5)
| Aneesa & MJ |
| Brad & Tori |
| Brittini & Landon |
| Derek & Kimberly |
| Diem & Evan |
| Dunbar & Paula |
| Eric & Jenn |
| Isaac & Ruthie |
| Mark & Rachel |

Dangle Duo (Ep. 6)
| Aneesa & MJ |
| Brad & Tori |
| Brittini & Landon |
| Derek & Kimberly |
| Diem & Evan |
| Dunbar & Paula |
| Eric & Jenn |
| Mark & Rachel |

== Episodes ==
| No. overall | No. in season | Title | Original release date |
|---|---|---|---|
| 221 | 1 | "Damned If You Duel..." | April 8, 2009 |
| 222 | 2 | "Duel Unto Others" | April 15, 2009 |
| 223 | 3 | "Duel What You Gotta Duel" | April 22, 2009 |
| 224 | 4 | "Duel-ality" | April 29, 2009 |
| 225 | 5 | "Duelers On The Verge Of A Nervous Breakdown" | May 6, 2009 |
| 226 | 6 | "Dueling For Dunbar" | May 13, 2009 |
| 227 | 7 | "Deja Duel" | May 20, 2009 |
| 228 | 8 | "If These Duels Could Talk" | May 27, 2009 |
| 229 | 9 | "Til Death Duel Us Part" | June 3, 2009 |
| 230 | 10 | "Duel Or Die" | June 10, 2009 |

=== Reunion special ===
The reunion aired on June 17, 2009, and was hosted by Maria Menounos and was taped at the MTV Studios on June 9, 2009. Cast members that attended were: Landon, Evan, Rachel, Brittini, Aneesa, Kim, Dunbar, Brad, Tori, Diem, Mark, Jenn, & Paula. The many relationships/hookups, fights & missions were discussed. First topic that was discussed was how Rachel beat all of the guys in the final mission. Mark stated that the reason why she had beat every one of the guys because the guys had to wait on the girls at the checkpoint during the middle of the mission. Brad felt like Rachel should have helped him dig more like how Brittini helped Evan, even though Rachel says she did. Maria then asked Evan & Rachel what they did with their money. Rachel said "she is having a good time with it." and Evan says "He is putting it all away and saving it for the right girl." Then, the CT/Adam fight was shown. Mark stated that besides the Diem situation being the source of the fight, past challenge history and them together on their season sparked more tension between the two. Jenn states that the fight was a whole lot worse when you were actually there, and Rachel says that CT shouldn't be allowed on any more of these challenges. The love triangle is discussed. Jenn said she had already known about Rachel & Aneesa's history and that Rachel avoided talking about it to either one of them, because she didn't want to hurt anyone's feelings. But, Aneesa felt like her feelings didn't matter and they were "swept under a rug." Kim then discussed that she & Dunbar had tried something after New Zealand but didn't work out. Evan then felt like Paula shook up the voting order when she voted for Dunbar instead of MJ, even though Paula denies that ever happens and says Evan "did her wrong". Mark & Landon felt like the missions were pretty easy and Landon says that he would rather lose to Brad than anyone else on the show. Brad states that the show added a stress factor to his relationship with Tori, but Tori confirms that they are engaged and will be getting married in April. It is also discussed why Mark came out of retirement after announcing it on the Gauntlet 2 reunion. Maria asks about Robin & Katie, Robin is pregnant and expecting a little boy and Katie is engaged. Mark also added that Brooke just moved in with her girlfriend from A Shot at Love with Tila Tequila. The Real World: Cancun preview is shown, thus ending another challenge reunion.
