= Duels (video game) =

2007 video game

Duels was a free player vs. player browser game. A player's avatar could either fight another player controlled avatar, or an NPC to gain experience points, gold, and tokens. Tokens were used to purchase packs containing scrolls, armor, and weapons. Gold was used to purchase armor, weapons, pets, and, in Duels 2.0, actions. Players were given the option to issue challenges to each other. When a player accepted a challenge, the avatars fought it out in real time, but without player interaction. As such, players did not need to be logged in to engage in battle. Duels offered paid memberships called Nobles or Patrons with many useful perk choices, and non-member players could purchase Challenge Coins which gave access to some of these more advanced menu choices for playing, but the game was not pay to play.

== History ==
Due to articles featured on TechCrunch and Digg, the game experienced more network traffic than its servers could handle at its launch in August 2007. In December 2007 Duels launched a new version of the game, called Duels 2.0. This version introduced female avatars and a new level of strategy with the addition of actions. In summer 2008, additional quests were added to help with non-paying players running short of game gold to buy actions. The multi duel feature of the challenge button was disabled due to an interference with in-game awarding of badges earned but not credited to player accounts. Other added features included multiple ladders for different level brackets, up to ten playable avatars per single player account, and multi item trading. The August expansion "Treasure of Abtu-Khan" was introduced with Noble and Patron challenge coin users having the option to shop in three other in-game stores besides the basic Armory that all duels.com players could use. Challenge Coin users could also choose to re-spec their avatars into two cat folk races besides the original human and elf options.

The Game has been shut down. All the profiles on the page have been deleted.

== Advancement ==
At level 5, characters could choose either the Path of the Sword or the Path of the Staff. At level 20, Path of the Sword characters could choose between Warrior and Assassin, while Path of the Staff characters chose between Mage and Druid. Depending which path was chosen, different skills were available for characters to learn. At level 25 Actions could be bought from the Action Shop and Action Sets constructed. Most level 25 or above players chose to challenge via full action sets (10 actions) or single action sets (1 action) and the type of challenge was indicated in the send Message/Taunt field. At level 40, players could choose between The Singlemind and The Elementals in the Corruption of the Abtu-Kahn quests. This also allowed players to transform their avatar into the undead or a feline as well as join alliance between the Elementals or Singlemind.

== Types of duels ==
- Challenge – This was a ranked match that counted towards a player's "win-lose" record, which gave more experience and better rewards than skirmishing. Usually, the rewards would be tokens, gold and experience. Characters would not get any more awards after challenging an avatar for the third time in a day.
- Skirmish – This unranked match did not count towards a player's "win-lose" record, and gave less experience, although the winning player may earn tokens. Some players were known to only skirmish and have 0-0 for their win-lose record.

== Tokens ==
Tokens were usually earned through fighting other avatars. Also, tokens could be earned through completing certain quests as a reward. Also, tokens could be bought with real money (US$).

Tokens were exchanged for packs of collectible weapons. The cost of packs differed greatly, for example the "Duels Core Set IV" cost 30 tokens, while the "Corruption" set cost over a thousand tokens. One of the most appealing parts of Duels was to trade in the Armory for rarer items from the older Item Sets; so what was common and inexpensive one day was rare and very valuable in the future.

== Quests ==
Duel's quests were shaped like a play. For example, the Abtu-Kahn quests had several parts. In those parts were several acts. In every act, players were supposed to do something different and complete the objectives.

Quests were divided into two types of quests: Tutorial quests and Game quests. Tutorial quests were quests teaching avatars about the multiple functions of Duels. For example, the "What's that in your Pocket?" quest taught characters about packs. Tutorial quests were unlocked either by killing a non-playing character (NPC), reaching a certain level or completing a certain tutorial quest.

Game quests were quests which had nothing to do with tutoring characters. There were two types of game quests: Events and Normal Quests. Event quests were special quests catered to low level characters which had to do with a particular holiday event.

"Normal" quests were quests that could be done anytime. They could be unlocked either by killing an NPC, losing to an NPC, reaching a certain level or completing a certain quest. These quests usually had several segments and took some time to complete.
