= Deuel =

Deuel may refer to:

- Reuel (name)

== People ==
- Corey Deuel (born 1977), American pocket billiards player
- Geoffrey Deuel (1943–2024), American actor
- Harry P. Deuel (1836–1914), prominent railroad man
- Patrick Deuel (1962–2016), American individual known for being one of the heaviest people in the world
- Pete Duel (1940–1971), born Peter Ellstrom Deuel, American actor

== Place ==
- Deuel County (disambiguation)

== Other ==
- Deuel Vocational Institution, a state prison located in San Joaquin County, California
- USS Deuel (APA-160)
