= The Real World: Hawaii =

Coordinates: 21°15′23″N 157°48′55″W

- Season 8
- The cast of The Real World: Hawaii
- Starring: Colin Mortensen; Amaya Brecher; Kaia Beck; Matt Simon; Justin Deabler; Ruthie Alcaide; Teck Holmes
- No. of episodes: 23

Release
- Original network: MTV
- Original release: June 15 – November 9, 1999

Season chronology
- ← Previous; The Real World: Seattle Next → The Real World: New Orleans

The Real World: Hawaii is the eighth season of MTV's reality television series The Real World, which focuses on a group of diverse strangers living together for several months in a different city each season, as cameras follow their lives and interpersonal relationships. It is the fourth season of The Real World to be filmed in the Pacific States region of the United States, and the first season set in the United States to be filmed outside of the contiguous United States.

The season featured seven people who lived in a modern beach house in Honolulu, Hawaii, which production started from January to May 15, 1999. The season premiered on June 15, of that year and consisted of 23 episodes.

The cast was heavily concerned with castmate Ruthie Alcaide's excessive drinking, which resulted in her leaving the house to enter an alcohol treatment program. This was cited as one of the series' memorable moments by Time magazine.

== The residence ==
The cast resided in a 4,095-square-foot (380.4 m^{2}), single-story, three-bedroom, four-bathroom house at 3169 Diamond Head Road in Diamond Head, Hawaii. The property's two-story guest house housed the control room and production offices during the filming. At the time of the filming of the series, the Diamond Head House rented for $10,000.00 a month, and was listed for sale for $7,500,000 in 2006. By March 2008, both houses were torn down, and new building permits were issued in February 2008.

== Assignment ==
Almost every season of The Real World, beginning with its fifth season, has included the assignment of a season-long group job or task to the housemates. The seven housemates worked at the Waikiki Location of Local Motion, a clothing and surf apparel store. They were responsible for booking in-store entertainment under a company they christened "7 Strangers Productions."

== Cast ==
Cast member	Age	Hometown
Amaya Brecher	21	Oakland, California
Amaya is a woman who attends UCLA. She became attracted to Colin, with whom she had an on-off relationship. Amaya revealed that in the past she had an eating disorder and issues with her body, but insisted that this was no longer the case. Near the end of the season, the bulk of her roommates began to turn on her, citing her insecure nature and speaking ill of them outside of their presence; however, she reconciles with most of them before leaving.
Colin Mortensen	19	Thousand Oaks, California
Colin was a college student at University of California, Berkeley prior to filming the show. Originally, he was one of the people who just missed making the cast, and was chosen instead to co-host an hour-long look at the casting process where he met a lot of finalists for the two shows, including some of his future castmates. In the last segment of the casting special, he met with the show's producers. There, they informed him that he was the final housemate, much to his surprise. Despite initially returning Amaya's affections, he eventually came to feel, along with Kaia and Matt, that Amaya was needy. He was also upset that she flirted with friends of his when they came to visit. Other cast members also disliked how Colin treated Amaya and how he talked to her.
Justin Deabler	21	Kingwood, Texas
Justin is an openly gay student at Harvard Law School and a self-described child prodigy. He does not develop a rapport with the others, except for Kaia during the early part of the show. He takes exception to Teck directly asking him if he's gay in the first episode, and is highly critical of almost all of his fellow housemates, the details of which he goes into during the group trip to India. He refers to Kaia as "ineffectual" and says that "Teck's schtick is so tired it's comatose." He tries to sabotage Amaya and Colin's relationship during the India vacation, but he leaves the house after the trip, partly due to his frustration with the other housemates, but citing as his primary reason a family emergency at home.
Kaia Beck	22	Chicago, Illinois
Kaia changed her name from Margaret to Kaia, which means "stability" in Swahili, after living in Tanzania. She now majors in African American studies at University of California, Berkeley. MTV characterizes her as a "strong woman in every sense of the word", and an extremely body-conscious person who maintains a strict diet and exercise routine, and who feels comfortable walking around topless while on camera. She is also a skilled debater and is likely to challenge any idea with which she does not agree.
Matt Simon	22	Del Mar, California
Matt was initially attracted to Ruthie. She did not reciprocate his romantic feelings. Matt then became close with Ruthie's twin sister, particularly during the discussions he, she, and her other sister had over Ruthie's drinking problem. He wrote to her when the cast visited India.
Ruthie Alcaide	21	Honolulu, Hawaii
Ruthie is a bisexual, adopted, Filipina college student at Rutgers University, and a triplet with a brother and sister, in addition to a second sister. She has a penchant for over-drinking, which often results in her passing out at bars, and inappropriate behavior like giving a table dance for her boss' wife. During another binge at the house, she takes a drinking glass and throws it, shattering it. During the first episode, she loses consciousness, and her housemates call the paramedics. Her housemates, along with Ruthie's two sisters, explore the possibility of sending her to a rehab center, but cannot do so without her consent. After Ruthie drives home from a bar intoxicated, her housemates have a meeting with her and tell her she must go to rehab or be evicted from the house. Ruthie feels betrayed, but goes to rehab, eventually returning when her stint is completed.
Tecumshea "Teck" Holmes	22	Peoria, Illinois
Teck is the son of a minister, whom MTV characterizes as a "ladies man" and a "party animal" with "a contagious energy and humor", but with an "extremely smart and responsible" side to him. His goal is to become an entertainer and segue into politics, hoping to be a positive black role model. He is currently producing, financing, and starring in a low-budget film set in Atlanta. He and Ruthie strip naked as soon as they arrive at the house in the season premiere, and jump into the pool.

=== Duration of cast ===
Cast members	Episodes																						
Cast members	1	2	3	4	5	6	7	8	9	10	11	12	13	14	15	16	17	18	19	20	21	22	23
Amaya	Featured	Featured	Featured	Featured	Featured	Featured	Featured	Featured	Featured	Featured	Featured	Featured	Featured	Featured	Featured	Featured	Featured	Featured	Featured	Featured	Featured	Featured	Featured
Colin	Featured	Featured	Featured	Featured	Featured	Featured	Featured	Featured	Featured	Featured	Featured	Featured	Featured	Featured	Featured	Featured	Featured	Featured	Featured	Featured	Featured	Featured	Featured
Kaia	Featured	Featured	Featured	Featured	Featured	Featured	Featured	Featured	Featured	Featured	Featured	Featured	Featured	Featured	Featured	Featured	Featured	Featured	Featured	Featured	Featured	Featured	Featured
Matt	Featured	Featured	Featured	Featured	Featured	Featured	Featured	Featured	Featured	Featured	Featured	Featured	Featured	Featured	Featured	Featured	Featured	Featured	Featured	Featured	Featured	Featured	Featured
Teck	Featured	Featured	Featured	Featured	Featured	Featured	Featured	Featured	Featured	Featured	Featured	Featured	Featured	Featured	Featured	Featured	Featured	Featured	Featured	Featured	Featured	Featured	Featured
Ruthie	Featured	Featured	Featured	Featured	Featured	Featured	Featured	Featured	Featured	Featured	Featured	Featured	Left (Note: Ruthie voluntarily left the house in Episode 13 to go to rehab.)					Return (Note: Ruthie returned to the house in Episode 18 to finish the show.)	Featured	Featured	Featured	Featured	Featured
Justin	Featured	Featured	Featured	Featured	Featured	Featured	Featured	Featured	Featured	Featured	Featured	Featured	Featured	Featured	Featured	Left (Note: Justin voluntarily left the house in Episode 16 due to a family emergency.)							

== Episodes ==
No. overall	No. in season	Title	Original release date
143	1	"Nudity and 911"	June 15, 1999
Ruthie and Teck meet up and click right away. Ruthie reveals to Teck that she has a girlfriend, and he guesses that she likes guys, too. They're the first to arrive at the house. It's locked, so they strip down and go skinny-dipping in the pool. Meanwhile, Matt and Amaya show up. They're a bit shocked by their new, uninhibited roommates. Kaia arrives at the house, and Matt says that Ruthie is everything he looks for in a woman. He's disappointed to learn that she has a girlfriend. When Justin arrives, Teck gets right to the point and asks him if he's gay. Justin is put off, but says yes. Colin, the former "reject" from the casting special, is last to arrive with the key. Everyone pours into their new island abode and selects rooms. Ruthie, Amaya and Matt decide to share, Teck and Kaia pair off, and Colin and Justin get the bunk beds. Kaia joins the naked brigade by peeling off her shirt. The next night, the cast goes clubbing. They boogie down while Ruthie slams back the drinks until she passes out. Amaya, Matt and Justin decide to take her home in a cab. They try unsuccessfully to sober her up and decide to call an ambulance. Amaya is crying and upset that the other roommates aren't there to help.
144	2	"The Trouble with Ruthie"	June 15, 1999
Colin, Teck and Kaia head home from the club and discuss Ruthie's alcohol problem. When Amaya and Justin return from the hospital, Amaya confronts Teck, telling him how pissed she was at the other roomies for bailing on the Ruthie situation. Teck appreciates her honesty and gives her a hug. Matt brings Ruthie home from the hospital. She has no recollection of what happened to her. As the sun rises, Ruthie tells Matt and Amaya that nothing like that ever happened to her before and she thinks her drink must have been spiked. Amaya tells Ruthie that she just drank too much. There is much concern in the house for Ruthie's well-being. Ruthie says that this incident is a wake-up call, but there's no way she's going to 12-step it.
145	3	"Teck and New Talent"	June 22, 1999
The roommates get a call from their new boss, Calvin, at Local Motion--a surf shop/cafe. They're running late for their first meeting, where they learn their job is to book talent and work in the new cafe. And Calvin gives them a set of wheels! They celebrate in song. Ruthie books an act she knows called 3-2-1. The cast heads out to promote the show at the college campus. At least 100 people have to come so they can get their big bonus. The show is a big hit with almost everyone, and the roomies get their big bonus. Now they just have to pull it off again next week.
146	4	"The Kiss Off Begins"	June 29, 1999
Ruthie and Kaia become really good friends when their mutual admiration heats up into a smooching session. This goes over really big with some of the guys in the house. The next morning, Kaia, now sober, has second thoughts about her lip-locking session with Ruthie. Ruthie claims she doesn't even remember the smooching. Meanwhile, Amaya, suggests they promote the club at frat houses and sororities. This goes over like a lead balloon. She's also having problems with one of the surfboards in the house. Colin and Matt make mandatory flip remarks, hurting her feelings. Amaya has a good cry in the hot tub. Ruthie hops in to give her a pep talk. As Colin and Amaya grow closer together, they deny that smooching has taken place between them.
147	5	"Pairing Off in Paradise"	July 6, 1999
The roommates discuss sex. Amaya and Colin share a bed, albeit platonically, and later have a fight. Kaia meets a man who asks her to a Janet Jackson concert, to which Kaia, a fan of Jackson's readily accepts. Amaya and Colin later make amends, and share a stroll on the beach, where they kiss.
148	6	"Sex, Cries and Videotape"	July 13, 1999
At the cast's first barbecue, Ruthie performs an impromptu freestyle rap. Amaya lets out her sexual frustration in a kickboxing class, after which she makes a romantic overture to Colin. The roommates join a celebration for Calvin's girlfriend's birthday, during which Ruthie gives him a lap dance, for which Ruthie apologizes to him the next day. Colin and Amaya's playful antics move to the hot tub, where he sarcastically tells her that women are ranked fourth in importance after male friends, Pez and toilet paper. In a confessional, Colin says he likes Amaya, but it seems her feelings for him are greater. Emotionally exhausted, Kaia confronts Ruthie about her drinking, which later brings Kaia to tears. At dinner, Matt voices the roommates' growing concern about Ruthie's behavior, though she denies that she has a problem.
149	7	"Relationship Rumblings"	July 20, 1999
Colin's incessant teasing irritates Amaya. When Teck brings a scantily dressed woman back to the house, the others have a few questions. Colin admits he's ready for love but fears he'll never have it. Teck does not foresee a monogamous relationship in his future, but his soft side comes out when he meets Andrea, a strong, charismatic woman from California, to whom he introduces his visiting father. Colin is at a loss for words when Amaya asks him to be nicer to her. He agrees to do so, but when Amaya also wants him to show his sweet side to the others, Colin admits he can't open up to just anyone. Andrea kisses Teck goodbye as she heads back to the mainland. Colin observes that he tends to distance himself from people to avoid getting hurt, and seeing that he has done this with Amaya, resolves to change, exhibiting vulnerability when he takes her on their first date.
150	8	"Gender Benders"	July 27, 1999
Justin is disgusted by the jokes in Local Motion comedian Auggie T.'s act, in contrast to Matt, who finds him hilarious. While visiting KCCN to promote Local Motion, Matt and the DJ banter on air about women. Justin is embarrassed to be there. Matt confronts Justin regarding his obvious disapproval while at the radio station. He accuses Justin of being heterophobic, prompting Justin to storm off. Kaia and Justin decide to try a seven-day fast. Amaya is in tears after she is kicked out of Justin's room, on account of how she and Colin "rock the bunk" every other night. Colin feels that Justin's prejudice against the heterosexual males in the house is the real problem. Justin opens up and reveals his past to Kaia. He was accused of "turning" his first boyfriend gay at age 16, and was almost arrested. Justin proposes a new plan for future Local Motion comedians. Teck disagrees, but the group ultimately sides with Justin.
151	9	"Ruthie Risks Her Life"	August 3, 1999
Overhearing Justin encourage Ruthie to drink before they go out, Colin vents his anger to Matt. Out on the town, Ruthie's had too much drink and Matt offers to pay for her cab ride home. She turns him down and takes her friends on a drunken joy ride instead. Back at the house, Colin questions Justin's approach to Ruthie's drinking. The next day, the supervising producer and director step out from behind the camera to call Ruthie in for a private meeting. Her drunk driving cannot be tolerated so they require that she start seeing an addiction specialist. When she hesitantly tells the roommates that she has to meet with a counselor in order to stay, Ruthie gets nothing but support. Ruthie is wary in her first counseling session with Dr. Alathea. Kaia tells Justin she wants to be there for Ruthie as a friend, but she distances herself when Ruthie is drunk. Tired of the nighttime club scene, Justin and Ruthie spend the day hiking to Manoa Falls.
152	10	"Hawaiian Havoc"	August 10, 1999
Matt and Colin share a boys' night out with Amaya joining them. Amaya's hit with some bad news from home when she learns that her father might have cancer. Feeling guilty that she is so far away, Amaya breaks down in tears. Matt scores a job at KCCN. At a Mardi Gras charity event, Amaya decides to tell Colin she's had enough of his cold shoulder. Colin thinks she's being overly dramatic. On the van ride home, the roommates voice their own opinions about Colin and Amaya's relationship. Later that night, Colin breaks the news to Amaya: She is becoming too dependent on him, and he needs some space. Upset about her sick father and Colin's latest request, Amaya checks her pulse in the midst of a major anxiety attack. After one week of "space" from Amaya and one night of margaritas with Matt, Colin invites Amaya back into his arms, and bed.
153	11	"Kaia Comes Clean"	August 17, 1999
Admittedly picky about men, Kaia is pleasantly surprised when she meets and instantly connects with Trey, a rap artist from The Pharcyde. At a viewing of the AIDS quilt, Kaia has a quiet moment as memories of her deceased father resurface. Having lost her father to AIDS, Kaia reveals to Justin that her awareness of the disease has caused a fear of intimacy. Running into the kitchen with an envelope in hand, Teck is the bearer of some very good news. The roommates gather to unanimously decide their vacation destination which turns out to be India. Teck and Kaia are excited for their vacation. To get away from the city life, Kaia and Justin make a trip to The Big Island for a touch of nature and some soul-searching inspiration. Upon returning from island-hoppin', Kaia recounts to Trey her moment of self-discovery.
154	12	"Glass Houses"	August 24, 1999
Happily reunited with her family, Ruthie introduces her older sister, Rachel, and twin sister, Sara, to the roommates. Out on the town, Rachel warns Matt about Ruthie's party habits. After Ruthie has too much to drink at the club, embarrasses Teck on the ride home, and shatters a glass on the kitchen floor, Teck decides to give Ruthie a piece of his mind. In tears over Teck's outrage, Ruthie runs off to her sister's hotel. As she stands on the balcony contemplating suicide, her sisters manage to talk her out of it. Later that night, the roommates discuss Ruthie's behavior and decide she needs to either get help for her alcohol problem or leave the house. Going behind the roommates' backs to "do what's right," Matt tells Ruthie about the planned intervention. As a result, Ruthie refuses to show up, and schedules a meeting on her own terms instead. Just prior to Ruthie's meeting, Justin questions Matt's methods and motives for helping her. Seated in the living room with her roommates, Ruthie takes a deep breath.
155	13	"Hasta Pasta, Hawaii"	August 31, 1999
In her scheduled meeting, Ruthie tells the roommates she is aware she let alcohol take over her life during her stay in Hawaii. She makes no promises to quit drinking, but swears to make a positive change. Knowing that Matt told Ruthie about their planned intervention, an angry Colin confronts him outside. Later that night, the roommates agree that Ruthie really needs medical treatment for her alcohol problem. They decide on a firm ultimatum: Check into a treatment facility or leave the house. Overwhelmed by the pressure of saving Ruthie, Matt breaks down in tears. Ruthie can't believe what she's hearing when the roommates announce their strict ultimatum. The next day, Ruthie meets with the roommates and tells them their decision was too extreme. Proposing a compromise, she agrees to quit drinking for the rest of her stay, and agrees to visit the clinic, "but not for 30 days." When the roommates refuse to negotiate, Ruthie voices her anger to her twin sister. Not willing to voice her plans, Ruthie packs up her things and moves out.
156	14	"Twin Trouble"	September 7, 1999
Several days have passed since Ruthie's departure and Matt is worried that no one knows what she is up to. At Local Motion, an emotional Ruthie says goodbye to Calvin. He comforts her by saying that he's there for her but is also concerned for her well-being. Later that day, Calvin tells the group that he understands what they are going through but feels they are slacking. The group agrees and in an attempt to pick up the pace, they decide to put on a talent show. At a local radio station, Teck freestyles a radio spot for the Local Motion talent show. While on the air, Teck gives a shout-out to Ruthie. After several messages from Matt, Ruthie agrees to meet him for dinner with Sara. When asked if she will come back, Ruthie says, "They need to miss me." Since their dinner, Matt and Sara have become inseparable. While out one evening Matt tells Sara that he wants to write a book about their situation. He says flirtatiously that he wants her to fall for him as a happy ending. As the roommates prepare for their inoculations for India, Teck takes charge. As they leave for India, Matt receives a disturbing call from Sara. She tells him that Ruthie feels betrayed. At the airport, he calls Sara trying to explain that his actions were for Ruthie's own good but his plea falls on deaf ears.
157	15	"Passage through India"	September 14, 1999
When the roommates arrive in India, they are greeted by their tour guide, Romesh. The surprise comes when they learn that they will be traveling aboard the "Palace on Wheels," India's most luxurious train. Later in their hotel room, Justin has "Cruel Intentions" and tells Kaia of his plot against Amaya. Aboard the "Palace on Wheels," Colin and Amaya decide to share a room. In the city of Jaipur, a group of local kids get a taste of Western culture. Teck delivers an impromptu beat box, as one of the kids busts out with his version of street dancing. On the train, Justin has some advice for Colin. With some subtle coaxing he persuades Colin that Amaya isn't stable enough to have a relationship with him. Reacting to Justin's comments, Colin turns on Amaya. In a strange twist, Justin meets with Amaya as he asks about her newly broken relationship with Colin. Acting surprised, Justin wonders why Colin is acting so strange. As the roommates say goodbye to India, Justin just wants to say goodbye to his roommates.
158	16	"Justin Fouls Out"	September 28, 1999
Amaya tells her friend Pam that Colin was nasty to her in India. To make things worse, she has planned an island-hopping trip with Colin. Pam thinks she's crazy to go with Colin so Amaya decides to have a chat with him. On the sea wall Amaya learns that Colin's behavior towards her was influenced by Justin and Kaia. Surprised, Amaya tells Colin that Justin made negative comments about him as well. "Why would someone like Justin want to create fights in paradise?" Colin wonders. Later, Colin confronts Kaia about Justin's behavior. Kaia tells Colin that she can't stand around and watch Justin hurt others, so she decides to distance herself from Justin. Meanwhile, on the phone with his mother, Justin learns that his great aunt is dying of cancer and decides to leave.
159	17	"Teck's Love Triangle"	October 5, 1999
With Justin gone, Colin has the room to himself and is happy to take the bottom bunk. Amaya has other plans. After arguing and then asking nicely, Colin allows Amaya into the Bay Room, occupying the top bunk. When she begins hitting on Colin again, he gets angry. Matt and Kaia wonder why Amaya puts up with Colin's verbal abuse and confront her, telling her to be strong and stand up for herself. Amaya takes the initiative and confronts Colin in the van in front of Kaia and Matt. Colin storms off. When Amaya approaches him the next day, he walks away and she cries. Amaya goes skydiving with Matt and Teck and gains some confidence about herself. Amaya writes Colin a letter, saying she is through with him. Meanwhile, Teck's clubbing with his stream of women leaves the roommates wondering whether this will catch up with him. Teck returns home at night with a woman and kicks Kaia out of their room. Matt and Teck go to a strip club, where Teck gets his underwear ripped off. On the phone with Ruthie, Kaia finds out that a girl named Malo dated both Ruthie and Teck. Ruthie reports that Malo said Teck called one of the women in the loft a bitch. Kaia tells this to Teck, who feels upset that he is slipping. Matt finds out from Ruthie that she will be returning to the loft soon.
160	18	"Ruthie Returns"	October 12, 1999
Ruthie's coming back to the house and Teck is unsure if she still likes him. It seems that Teck and Ruthie are seeing the same girl, Malo. Still troubled over her breakup with Colin, Amaya has stopped eating. At lunch, Amaya's friend Pam becomes concerned. Amaya then tells Pam that after her last breakup, she couldn't eat for a month. Ruthie's back and is greeted with open arms by Colin and Matt. But Amaya isn't quite as warm. Teck is surprised when he finds out that Ruthie has brought Malo back to the house with her. While Ruthie connects with the rest of the roomies, Malo faces off with Teck.
161	19	"My Oh Amaya"	October 19, 1999
Ruthie and Colin get down to the business of silk screening T-shirts as the roomies prepare for an upcoming charity boat cruise sponsored by Local Motion. Later that day Amaya and Colin take a tour of the children's hospital to see who will benefit from their cruise. While on the phone with a friend, Amaya talks of Ruthie's return. Amaya feels that Ruthie is faking a sunny disposition. Over lunch, Ruthie and Colin talk about her time away from the house. Colin feels that Ruthie has changed for the better. Ruthie tells Colin that she has no regrets but can't understand Amaya's "attitude" since her return. At the airport, Colin can't wait as he holds a sign up for his friends and former casting rejects Mike and Trevor, who are coming to visit. In a confessional, Colin and his boys talk about their brush with the law. Tensions mount as Ruthie confronts Amaya about a shirt that she wanted to borrow. Amaya gives her attitude and Ruthie storms out of the room. "My roommates are such bitches," exclaims Ruthie. After a successful charity cruise, Colin and the roommates present a huge check to the children's hospital.
162	20	"Lovesickness"	October 26, 1999
During a performance at Local Motion, Amaya has her sights set on Michael, the keyboard player from The Hawaiian Style Band. When Kaia learns that Colin has asked Ruthie to join them on a trip to Maui, she decides not to go. Colin and Ruthie, clearly not bothered by Kaia's action, look at this as an opportunity to get to know each other better. Later that evening Amaya and Michael go out for Cinco de Mayo. At dinner, Amaya can't take her eyes off Michael as they kiss and later take a midnight stroll along the pier. Ecstatic over her date with Michael, Amaya can't wait to see him again and invites him over for drinks. With Matt's help, Amaya gives the house a well-deserved cleaning--and her sheets a fresh wash. Matt confronts Kaia about Amaya when he overhears her talking to a friend about a medical problem. Kaia tells him not to jump to conclusions, but when he finds a magazine opened to an article on STDs, he can't help but wonder if someone in the house has one. During a conversation with Matt about Michael, Amaya comes apart as she is faced with issues of intimacy due to her recent medical scare. Kaia confronts Amaya because she wasn't told that Amaya's tests came back negative. After all the drama, Kaia wonders if Amaya was being a fair-weather friend.
163	21	"Strange Bedfellows"	November 2, 1999
Amaya takes a liking to Colin's friend Tony, who is visiting from the mainland and flirts with him to make Colin jealous. In a confessional, Colin shares a piece of advice to his friend, Tony, regarding Amaya. Although she and Tony spent the night together, Amaya insists that nothing happened. The next morning, the roommates question Amaya's actions while Colin coldly says goodbye to Tony. Over lunch, Kaia, Matt, Ruthie and Colin discuss Amaya's attitude in the house. The roommates are tired of her talking behind their backs and being two-faced towards them. Later in the kitchen, Amaya corners Colin in an attempt to set the record straight about Tony. Colin, clearly upset with Amaya, ignores her and escapes to the confessional. Feeling isolated, Amaya breaks down to Pam on the phone, telling her that she feels alienated by the roommates and wants to go home. In an unlikely move, Amaya turns to Ruthie, who knows all too well what it's like to be an outcast. After apologizing for her past attitude towards Ruthie, Amaya takes some tough criticism and decides to make peace with the roommates. Amaya's attempt to clear the air with her roommate's backfires when pent-up anger towards her turns into an ugly confrontation.
164	22	"The Final Clash"	November 9, 1999
In the van, Ruthie tells Colin she feels bad about the house ganging up on Amaya. In response, Colin believes that their confrontation will help Amaya become a better person. Feeling the effects of the roommates' animosity towards her, an emotionally charged Amaya explains to Pam her desire to confront Kaia. When Kaia corners Matt in the kitchen, he's at a loss for words. The roommates decide to produce their own talent show for the final performance at Local Motion. Teck and Matt get in touch with their "feminine side" when they spoof the daytime talk show, The View. Kaia also plants a big wet one on Matt during the show. While the roommates throw a farewell party outside, Kaia invites Matt to sleep in her bed. There, Matt confesses that he is confused about his feelings towards both her and Ruthie's sister, Sara.
165	23	"Mahalo"	November 9, 1999
The next morning, Ruthie confronts Matt over his feelings for Sara. Matt realizes he loves Sara but wants to keep Kaia as a friend. Matt knows he has to tell Kaia how he feels. Meanwhile, Amaya remembers Ruthie telling her to stand up for herself. Empowered, Amaya confronts Kaia, admitting she is guilty, but no more than any other roommate. Amaya feels good about herself, having stood up to Kaia. As their time winds down, Teck and Colin surf for the last time. Ruthie and Amaya watch their last sunset and Ruthie takes a picture of a victorious Amaya. Kaia sits on the roof with Colin, distancing herself from Matt. Matt feels Kaia does not want to face up to the truth. The next morning, the roommates wake up, pack and head to the airport. Malo makes a surprise appearance, and has a tearful goodbye with Ruthie. Amaya is the first to depart. Sharing friendly good-byes with Ruthie and Colin, Kaia remains icy and distant. Happy to be going home, Amaya picks up her bags and walks to her plane. Matt and Colin are the next to leave, followed by Ruthie. They share memories, feelings towards each other, and hugs goodbye. In an airport corridor, Kaia and Teck say goodbye and part company, heading off in different directions.

== After filming ==
After filming, MTV launched an online auction for selling the season's house items and donated the money to the Recording Artists, Actors and Athletes Against Drunk Driving.

At the 2008 The Real World Awards Bash, Amaya and Colin received a nomination for "Favorite Love Story", while Teck received one for "Biggest Playa".

Amaya went on to co-host two shows on astrology via webradio and podcast. On the Cosmic Sutra, she and a psychic discuss astrology, while Stargazing is a gossip show about how celebrities can employ astrology to their advantage.

Colin was part of the cast of the short-lived comedy television series M.Y.O.B. In 2005, he released a guide book, titled A New Ladies' Man: A Complete Guide to Getting, Pleasing, and Keeping the Girl. He later went into educational leadership.

Ruthie Alcaide went on to become a singer in a band, and a lecturer on college campuses about her experiences. She has also appeared in alcohol awareness commercials on the Armed Forces Network (AFN). Explaining her dislike of labels pertaining to her sexual orientation, she has stated that she does not like being called "straight", "gay" or "bisexual", saying, "Just call me Ruthie". In 2018, she appeared in the movie The Rainbow Bridge Motel.

Teck Holmes went on to pursue an acting career, appearing in films such as Van Wilder and First Daughter, and on television series such as The Hughleys, The Parkers, Friends and NCIS. He has hosted TV shows such as MTV's Direct Effect, and the Cartoon Network game show Hole in the Wall. His group The Firemen produced a music video for their song "Smoke With Me" that played on BET.

Justin Deabler lives in Brooklyn with his husband and their son. In 2021, he published his first novel, titled Lone Stars.

=== The Challenge ===
Cast member	Seasons of The Challenge	Other appearances
Colin Mortensen	Battle of the Sexes	—N/a
Amaya Brecher	Challenge 2000, Battle of the Sexes	—N/a
Matt Simon	—N/a	—N/a
Justin Deabler	—N/a	—N/a
Kaia Beck	—N/a	—N/a
Ruthie Alcaide	Battle of the Sexes, Battle of the Sexes 2, The Gauntlet 2, The Duel II	The Challenge: All Stars (season 1)
Tecumshea "Teck" Holmes	Challenge 2000	The Challenge: All Stars (season 1), The Challenge: All Stars (season 2)
