= The Duel (1927 film) =

1927 film

- Directed by: Jacques de Baroncelli
- Written by: René Jeanne (novel); Jacques de Baroncelli
- Starring: Mady Christians; Gabriel Gabrio; Jean Murat
- Cinematography: Louis Chaix
- Production companies: Films de France; Société des Cinéromans
- Release date: 1927
- Country: France
- Languages: Silent; French intertitles

The Duel (French:Le duel) is a 1927 French silent film directed by Jacques de Baroncelli and starring Mady Christians, Gabriel Gabrio and Jean Murat.

== Cast ==
- Mady Christians
- Gabriel Gabrio as Debreole
- Jean Murat
- Andrée Standart
- Georges Despaux
- Janine Borelli
- Lucienne Parizet
- Jane Thierry
- Sarah Clèves
- Henri Rudaux
- Marcel Doret

== Bibliography ==
- Goble, Alan. The Complete Index to Literary Sources in Film. Walter de Gruyter, 1999.
