= The Duel (1939 film) =

- Directed by: Pierre Fresnay
- Written by: Henri-Georges Clouzot; Henri Lavedan
- Produced by: Raymond Borderie
- Starring: Pierre Fresnay; Raimu
- Cinematography: Christian Matras; Robert Juillard
- Edited by: Bernard Séjourné
- Music by: Maurice Yvain
- Distributed by: Pathé Consortium Cinéma
- Release date: 1939
- Running time: 82 minutes
- Country: France
- Language: French

The Duel is a French film directed by Pierre Fresnay, released in 1939. It is the only film directed by Pierre Fresnay.

== Résumé ==
A widow is loved by a doctor whose brother, a priest, unwittingly falls in love with the young woman, who is persuaded to enter the convent. Put on the right path by a missionary, the priest blesses the marriage of his brother.

== Details ==
1939 comedy: Length 84'- B&W

- Co-writer Jean Villard
- Director : Pierre Fresnay
- Writers : Henri-Georges Clouzot and Henri Lavedan
- Year : 1939
- After the novel by Henri Lavedan
- Director of photography Robert Juillard and Christian Matras
- Music by Maurice Yvain

== Starring ==
- Pierre Fresnay : Père Daniel Maurey
- Raimu : Père Bolène
- François Périer : François
- Anthony Carretier : Jaillon
- Yvonne Printemps : Thérèse Jaillon
- Raymond Rouleau : Dr. Pierre Maurey
- Paul Demange : le narrateur
- Nina Sinclair : la patiente
- Arlette Balkis
- Raymond Destac
- Marfa Dhervilly
- Gabrielle Fontan
- Simone Gauthier
- Georges Marceau
- Alexandre Mihalesco
- André Numès
- Manécanterie des Petits Chanteurs à la croix de bois

== See also ==
The filmography of Petits Chanteurs à la Croix de Bois.
