= List of The Real World cast members =

The Real World is an American reality television show in which a group of strangers live together in a house for several months, as cameras record their interpersonal relationships. First broadcast in 1992, the show is one of the longest-running program in MTV history.

As of Season 33, a total of 259 cast members have appeared on the series.

== Cast members ==
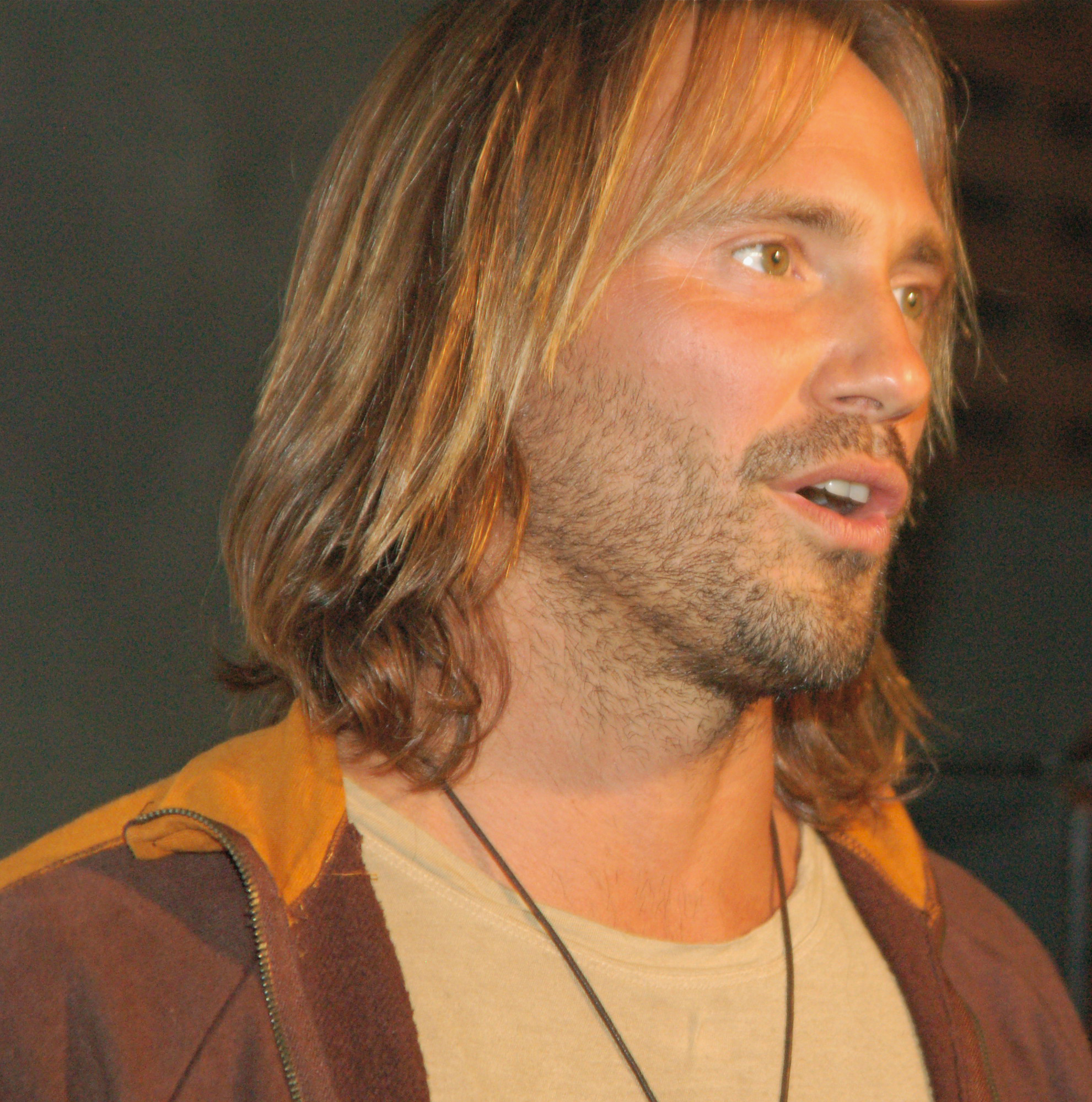
Eric Nies, The Real World: New York

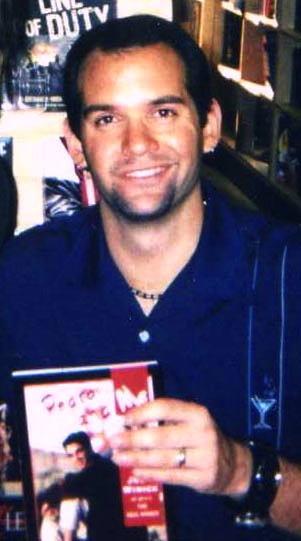
Judd Winick, The Real World: San Francisco

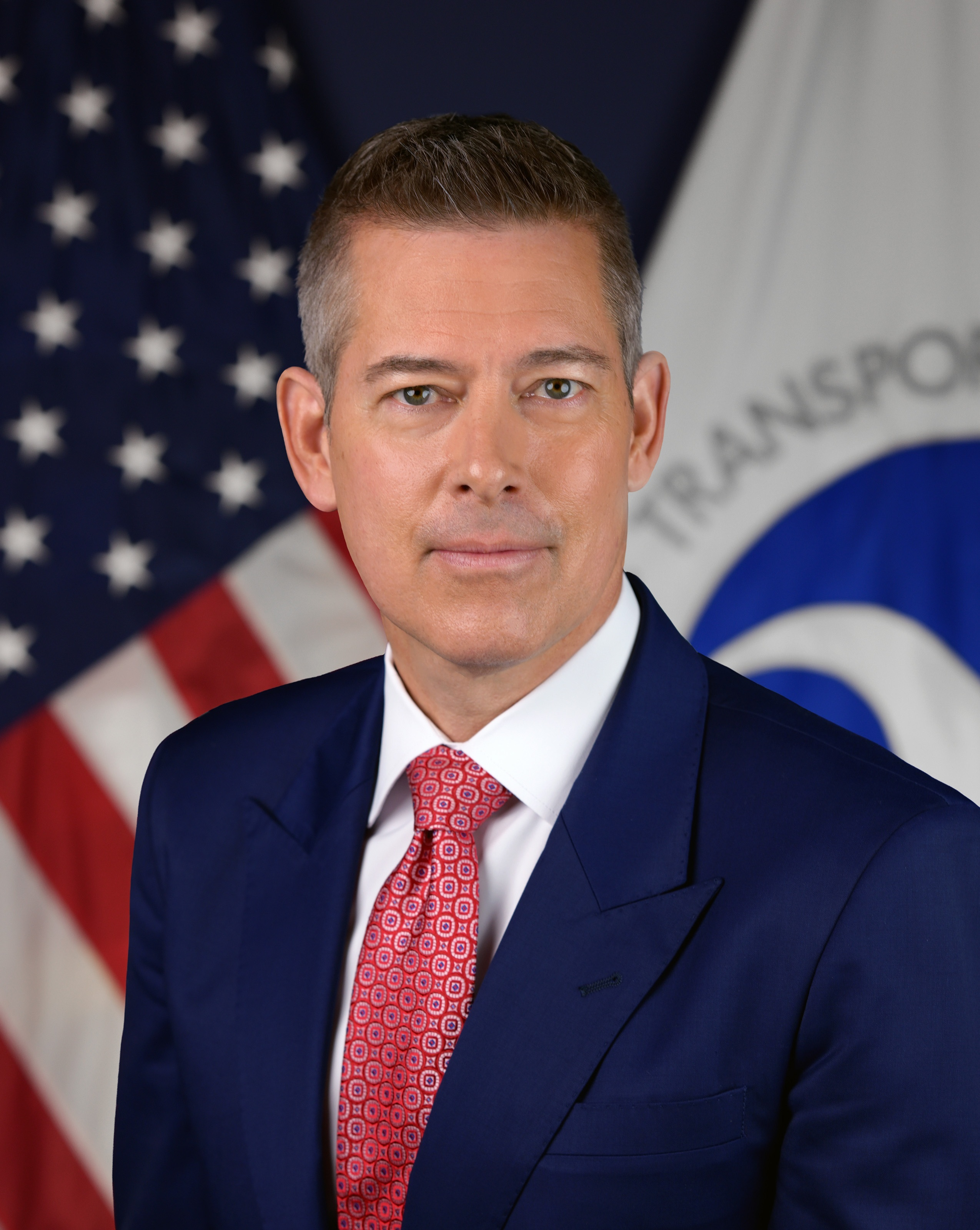
Sean Duffy, The Real World: Boston

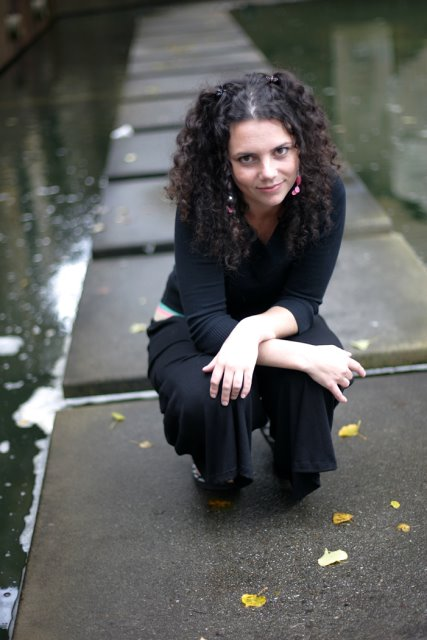
Irene McGee, The Real World: Seattle

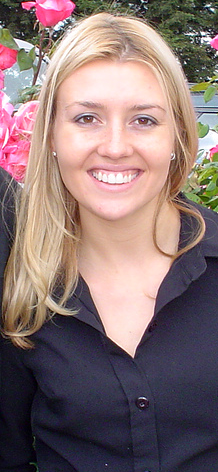
Julie Stoffer, The Real World: New Orleans

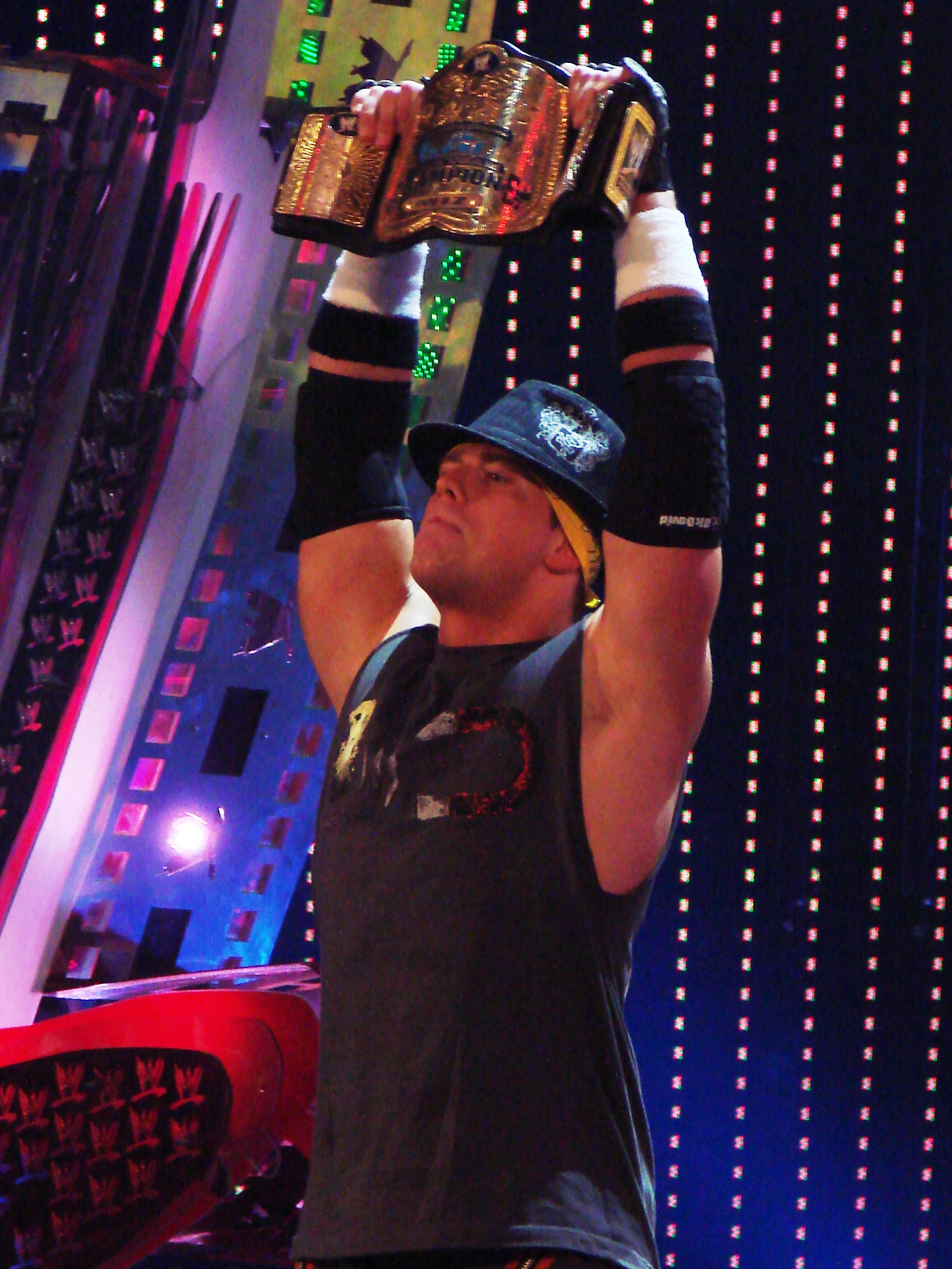
Mike Mizanin, The Real World: Back to New York

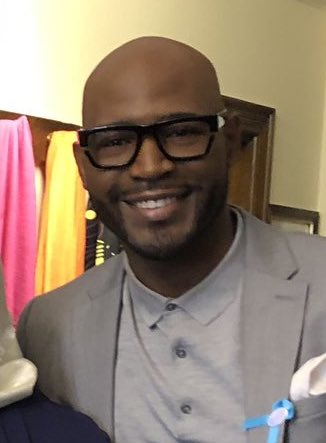
Karamo Brown, The Real World: Philadelphia

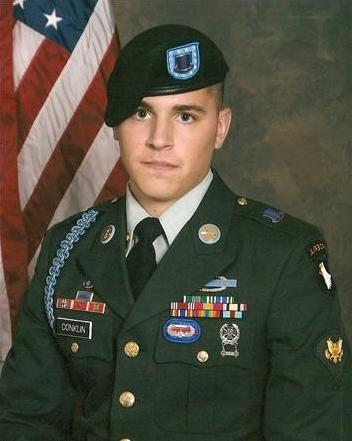
Ryan Conklin, The Real World: Brooklyn

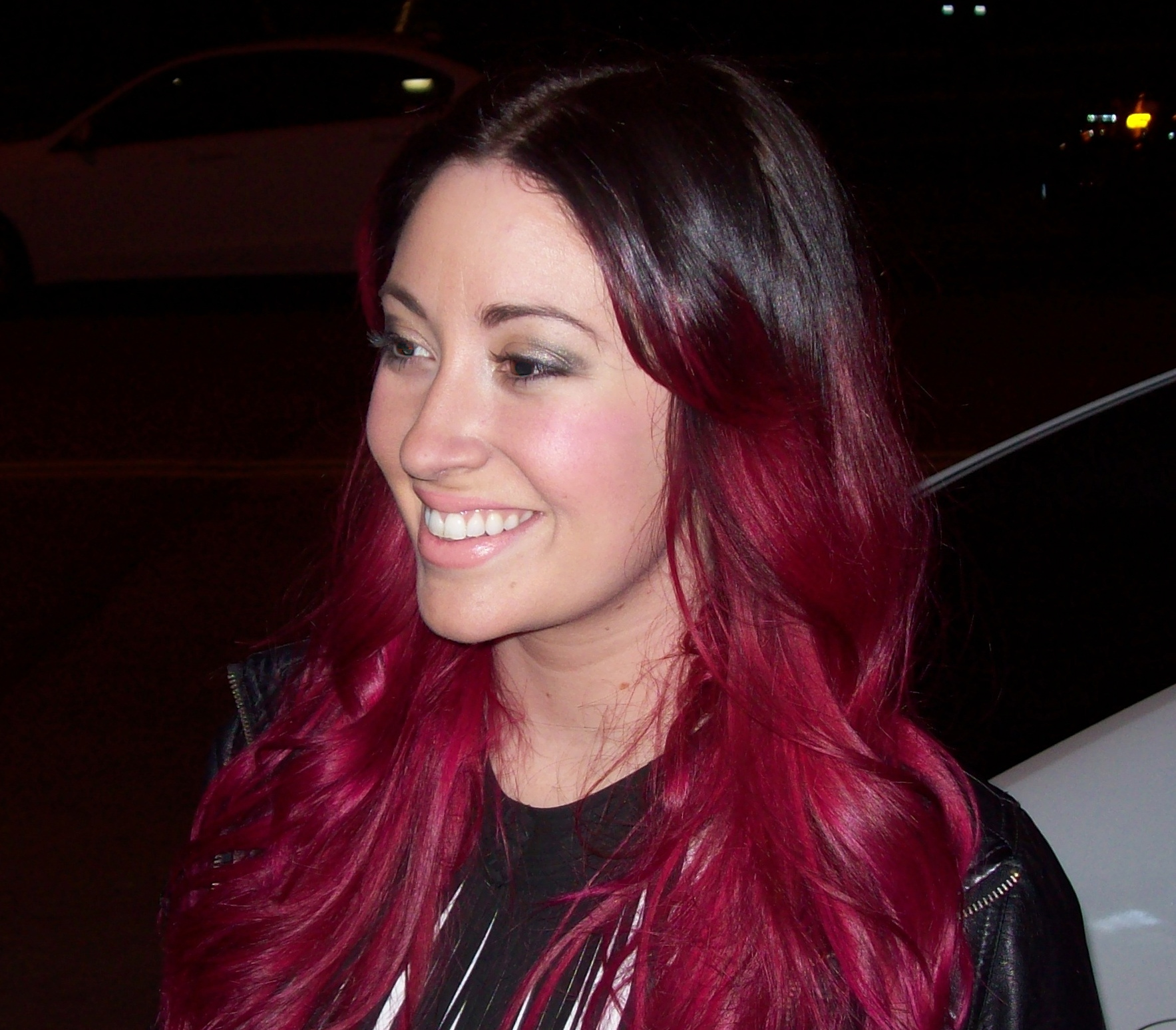
Erika Lauren Wasilewski, The Real World: D.C.

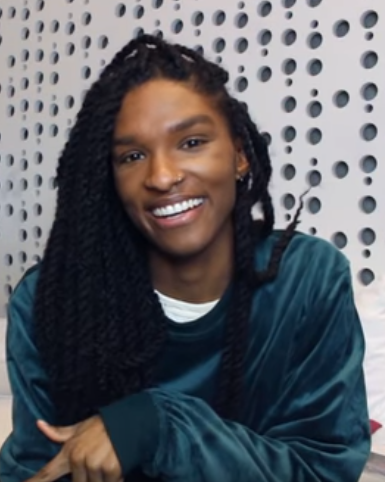
Ari Fitz, Real World: Ex-Plosion

Season	Name	Age^{[I]}	Hometown
The Real World: New York	Becky Blasband	24	New Hope, Pennsylvania
The Real World: New York	Andre Comeau	21	Royal Oak, Michigan
The Real World: New York	Heather B. Gardner	21	Jersey City, New Jersey
The Real World: New York	Julie Gentry	18	Birmingham, Alabama
The Real World: New York	Norman Korpi	25	Williamston, Michigan
The Real World: New York	Eric Nies	21	Ocean Township, New Jersey
The Real World: New York	Kevin Powell	25	Jersey City, New Jersey
The Real World: Los Angeles	Aaron Behle	21	Orange County, California
The Real World: Los Angeles	Beth Stolarczyk	24	Cleveland, Ohio
The Real World: Los Angeles	David Edwards	21	Washington, D.C.
The Real World: Los Angeles	Dominic Griffin	24	Dublin, Ireland
The Real World: Los Angeles	Irene Berrera-Kearns	25	Los Angeles, California
The Real World: Los Angeles	Jon Brennan	18	Owensboro, Kentucky
The Real World: Los Angeles	Tami Roman	22	Los Angeles, California
The Real World: Los Angeles	Beth Anthony	22	Eugene, Oregon
The Real World: Los Angeles	Glen Naessens	22	Philadelphia, Pennsylvania
The Real World: San Francisco	Mohammed Bilal	24	San Francisco, California
The Real World: San Francisco	Rachel Campos	23	Tempe, Arizona
The Real World: San Francisco	Pam Ling	26	Los Angeles, California
The Real World: San Francisco	Cory Murphy	20	Fresno, California
The Real World: San Francisco	David "Puck" Rainey	25	San Francisco, California
The Real World: San Francisco	Judd Winick	24	Long Island, New York
The Real World: San Francisco	Pedro Zamora	22	Miami, Florida
The Real World: San Francisco	Joanna "Jo" Rhodes	22	London, England
The Real World: London	Jacinda Barrett	22	Brisbane, Australia
The Real World: London	Neil Forrester	24	Keynsham, England
The Real World: London	Jay Frank	19	Portland, Oregon
The Real World: London	Sharon Gitau	19	London, England
The Real World: London	Mike Johnson	22	St. Louis, Missouri
The Real World: London	Kat Ogden	19	Yelm, Washington
The Real World: London	Lars Schlichting	24	Berlin, Germany
The Real World: Miami	Flora Alekseyeun	24	Boston, Massachusetts
The Real World: Miami	Sarah Becker	25	Chicago, Illinois
The Real World: Miami	Mike Lambert	24	Jacksonville, Florida
The Real World: Miami	Melissa Padrón	22	Miami, Florida
The Real World: Miami	Joe Patane	25	Brooklyn, New York
The Real World: Miami	Dan Renzi	21	New Brunswick, New Jersey
The Real World: Miami	Cynthia Roberts	22	San Jose, California
The Real World: Boston	Jason Cornwell	24	Boulder, Colorado
The Real World: Boston	Sean Duffy	25	Hayward, Wisconsin
The Real World: Boston	Montana McGlynn	21	Manhattan, New York
The Real World: Boston	Genesis Moss	20	Gulfport, Mississippi
The Real World: Boston	Kameelah Phillips	19	San Diego, California
The Real World: Boston	Elka Walker	19	Brownsville, Texas
The Real World: Boston	Syrus Yarbrough	25	Santa Monica, California
The Real World: Seattle	Nathan Blackburn	21	Chesterfield, Virginia
The Real World: Seattle	Lindsay Brien	21	Aspen, Colorado
The Real World: Seattle	David Burns	21	Boston, Massachusetts
The Real World: Seattle	Janet Choi	21	Chicago, Illinois
The Real World: Seattle	Rebecca Lord	19	Charlottesville, Virginia
The Real World: Seattle	Irene McGee	22	Pleasant Valley, New York
The Real World: Seattle	Stephen Williams	20	San Diego, California
The Real World: Hawaii	Ruthie Alcaide	21	Honolulu, Hawaii
The Real World: Hawaii	Amaya Brecher	21	Oakland, California
The Real World: Hawaii	Margaret "Kaia" Beck	22	Chicago, Illinois
The Real World: Hawaii	Justin Deabler	21	Houston, Texas
The Real World: Hawaii	Tecumseh "Teck" Holmes, III	22	Peoria, Illinois
The Real World: Hawaii	Colin Mortensen	19	Thousand Oaks, California
The Real World: Hawaii	Matt Simon	22	Del Mar, California
The Real World: New Orleans	David Broom	22	Chicago, Illinois
The Real World: New Orleans	Melissa Howard	22	Tampa, Florida
The Real World: New Orleans	Kelley Limp	21	Fayetteville, Arkansas
The Real World: New Orleans	Jamie Murray	22	Wilmette, Illinois
The Real World: New Orleans	Danny Roberts	22	Rockmart, Georgia
The Real World: New Orleans	Matt Smith	21	Hiawassee, Georgia
The Real World: New Orleans	Julie Stoffer	21	Delafield, Wisconsin
The Real World: Back to New York	Rachel Braband	18	Chicago, Illinois
The Real World: Back to New York	Malik Cooper	23	Berkeley, California
The Real World: Back to New York	Kevin Dunn	22	Austin, Texas
The Real World: Back to New York	Nicole Jackson	22	Atlanta, Georgia
The Real World: Back to New York	Mike Mizanin	20	Parma, Ohio
The Real World: Back to New York	Coral Smith	21	San Francisco, California
The Real World: Back to New York	Lori Trespicio	21	Roseland, New Jersey
The Real World: Chicago	Chris Beckman	24	Brockton, Massachusetts
The Real World: Chicago	Kyle Brandt	23	Lincolnshire, Illinois
The Real World: Chicago	Tonya Cooley	21	Walla Walla, Washington
The Real World: Chicago	Aneesa Ferreira	20	Narberth, Pennsylvania
The Real World: Chicago	Keri Evans	22	New Orleans, Louisiana
The Real World: Chicago	Theo Gantt III	19	Riverside, California
The Real World: Chicago	Cara Nussbaum	22	Boston, Massachusetts
The Real World: Las Vegas	Trishelle Cannatella	22	Cut Off, Louisiana
The Real World: Las Vegas	Arissa Hill	22	Malden, Massachusetts
The Real World: Las Vegas	Steven Hill	23	San Marcos, Texas
The Real World: Las Vegas	Frank Roessler	22	Lewisburg, Pennsylvania
The Real World: Las Vegas	Brynn Smith	21	Portland, Oregon
The Real World: Las Vegas	Irulan Wilson	21	Bronx, New York
The Real World: Las Vegas	Alton Williams	22	San Diego, California
The Real World: Paris	Ace Amerson	24	Statesboro, Georgia
The Real World: Paris	Leah Gillingwater	22	Long Island, New York
The Real World: Paris	Adam King	23	Beverly Hills, California
The Real World: Paris	Simon Sherry-Wood	18	Dublin, Ireland
The Real World: Paris	Mallory Snyder	19	Ames, Iowa
The Real World: Paris	Chris "CT" Tamburello	22	Boston, Massachusetts
The Real World: Paris	Christina Trainor	24	Las Vegas, Nevada
The Real World: San Diego	Frankie Abernathy	23	Kansas City, Missouri
The Real World: San Diego	Randy Barry	24	Boston, Massachusetts
The Real World: San Diego	Jamie Chung	20	San Francisco, California
The Real World: San Diego	Cameran Eubanks	19	Anderson, South Carolina
The Real World: San Diego	Brad Fiorenza	23	Chicago, Illinois
The Real World: San Diego	Robin Hibbard	23	Tampa, Florida
The Real World: San Diego	Jacquese Smith	19	Paterson, New Jersey
The Real World: San Diego	Charlie Dordevich	18	Belgrade, Serbia
The Real World: Philadelphia	Shavonda Bilingslea	21	San Diego, California
The Real World: Philadelphia	Karamo Brown	23	Houston, Texas
The Real World: Philadelphia	Sarah Burke	23	Tampa, Florida
The Real World: Philadelphia	M.J. Garrett	23	Nashville, Tennessee
The Real World: Philadelphia	William "Willie" Hernandez	23	New York City, New York
The Real World: Philadelphia	Landon Lueck	24	Madison, Wisconsin
The Real World: Philadelphia	Melanie Silcott	21	Santa Cruz, California
The Real World: Austin	Wes Bergmann	19	Leawood, Kansas
The Real World: Austin	Johanna Botta	21	Riverside, California
The Real World: Austin	Lacey Buehler	23	Tallahassee, Florida
The Real World: Austin	Nehemiah Clark	19	Rancho Cucamonga, California
The Real World: Austin	Danny Jamieson	21	Billerica, Massachusetts
The Real World: Austin	Rachel Moyal	21	Valencia, California
The Real World: Austin	Melinda Stolp	21	Germantown, Wisconsin
The Real World: Key West	Janelle Casanave	23	San Jose, California
The Real World: Key West	John Devenanzio	23	Fullerton, California
The Real World: Key West	Tyler Duckworth	23	Minneapolis, Minnesota
The Real World: Key West	Zach Mann	22	Vashon, Washington
The Real World: Key West	Paula Meronek	24	Meriden, Connecticut
The Real World: Key West	Svetlana Shusterman	19	Richboro, Pennsylvania
The Real World: Key West	Jose Tapia	20	Brooklyn, New York
The Real World: Denver	Tyrie Ballard	23	Omaha, Nebraska
The Real World: Denver	Colie Edison	22	East Brunswick, New Jersey
The Real World: Denver	Jenn Grijalva	22	Martinez, California
The Real World: Denver	Brooke LaBarbara	24	Nashville, Tennessee
The Real World: Denver	Davis Mallory	23	Marietta, Georgia
The Real World: Denver	Stephen Nichols	22	Sacramento, California
The Real World: Denver	Alex Smith	22	Houston, Texas
The Real World: Sydney	Trisha Cummings	19	Fresno, California
The Real World: Sydney	Dunbar Flinn	22	Natchez, Mississippi
The Real World: Sydney	Kelly Anne Judd	20	Georgetown, Texas
The Real World: Sydney	Cohutta Lee Grindstaff	23	Blue Ridge, Georgia
The Real World: Sydney	Parisa Montazaran	21	Commack, New York
The Real World: Sydney	Isaac Stout	21	Cleveland, Ohio
The Real World: Sydney	Shauvon Torres	24	Sacramento, California
The Real World: Sydney	Ashli Robson	19	Huntington Beach, California
The Real World: Hollywood	Kimberly Alexander	25	Columbia, South Carolina
The Real World: Hollywood	Will Gilbert	24	Detroit, Michigan
The Real World: Hollywood	Greg Halstead	20	Daytona Beach, Florida
The Real World: Hollywood	Joey Kovar	24	Chicago, Illinois
The Real World: Hollywood	Dave Malinosky	22	Waynesboro, Pennsylvania
The Real World: Hollywood	Sarah Ralston	21	Phoenix, Arizona
The Real World: Hollywood	Brianna Taylor	20	Philadelphia, Pennsylvania
The Real World: Hollywood	Nick Brown	23	New Rochelle, New York
The Real World: Hollywood	Brittini Sherrod	22	Tempe, Arizona
The Real World: Brooklyn	Chet Cannon	23	Salt Lake City, Utah
The Real World: Brooklyn	Ryan Conklin	23	Gettysburg, Pennsylvania
The Real World: Brooklyn	Katelynn Cusanelli	24	West Palm Beach, Florida
The Real World: Brooklyn	Scott Herman	23	Salem, New Hampshire
The Real World: Brooklyn	J.D. Ordonez	22	Miami Beach, Florida
The Real World: Brooklyn	Sarah Rice	22	San Francisco, California
The Real World: Brooklyn	Devyn Simone	20	Kansas City, Missouri
The Real World: Brooklyn	Baya Voce	21	Salt Lake City, Utah
The Real World: Cancun	Bronne Bruzgo	21	Yardley, Pennsylvania
The Real World: Cancun	Derek Chavez	21	Phoenix, Arizona
The Real World: Cancun	Ayiiia Elizarraras	22	San Diego, California
The Real World: Cancun	Emilee Fitzpatrick	21	Boston, Massachusetts
The Real World: Cancun	Christian "CJ" Koegel	24	Boca Raton, Florida
The Real World: Cancun	Jonna Mannion	20	Tempe, Arizona
The Real World: Cancun	Jasmine Reynaud	22	Houston, Texas
The Real World: Cancun	Joey Rozmus	22	Lawrence, Massachusetts
The Real World: D.C.	Josh Colon	23	Philadelphia, Pennsylvania
The Real World: D.C.	Ashley Lindley	22	San Francisco, California
The Real World: D.C.	Mike Manning	22	Thornton, Colorado
The Real World: D.C.	Ty Ruff	22	Baltimore, Maryland
The Real World: D.C.	Emily Schromm	20	Kirksville, Missouri
The Real World: D.C.	Callie Walker	21	Galveston, Texas
The Real World: D.C.	Erika Wasilewski	21	Chicago, Illinois
The Real World: D.C.	Andrew Woods	21	Westminster, Colorado
The Real World: New Orleans	Jemmye Carroll	22	Starkville, Mississippi
The Real World: New Orleans	McKenzie Coburn	21	Jupiter, Florida
The Real World: New Orleans	Sahar Dika	21	Dearborn Heights, Michigan
The Real World: New Orleans	Ashlee Feldman	23	Boston, Massachusetts
The Real World: New Orleans	Ryan Knight	23	Kenosha, Wisconsin
The Real World: New Orleans	Ryan Leslie	21	Tempe, Arizona
The Real World: New Orleans	Eric Patrick	24	Arlington, Virginia
The Real World: New Orleans	Preston Roberson-Charles	22	Boston, Massachusetts
The Real World: Las Vegas	Naomi Defensor	22	Bronx, New York
The Real World: Las Vegas	Leroy Garrett	25	Romulus, Michigan
The Real World: Las Vegas	Nany Gonzalez	21	Jamestown, New York
The Real World: Las Vegas	Heather Marter	21	Delran, New Jersey
The Real World: Las Vegas	Michael Ross	23	Nokesville, Virginia
The Real World: Las Vegas	Adam Royer	22	Falmouth, Maine
The Real World: Las Vegas	Dustin Zito	24	Rayne, Louisiana
The Real World: Las Vegas	Heather Cooke	21	California, Maryland
The Real World: San Diego	Alexandra Govere	21	Los Angeles, California
The Real World: San Diego	Ashley Kelsey	24	Winsted, Connecticut
The Real World: San Diego	Sam McGinn	21	Chesapeake, Virginia
The Real World: San Diego	Priscilla Mendez	19	San Diego, California
The Real World: San Diego	Zach Nichols	23	Brighton, Michigan
The Real World: San Diego	Nate Stodghill	22	Grain Valley, Missouri
The Real World: San Diego	Frank Sweeney	22	Canastota, New York
The Real World: St. Thomas	La Toya Jackson	22	Petersburg, Virginia
The Real World: St. Thomas	Brandon Kane	24	Quincy, Massachusetts
The Real World: St. Thomas	Marie Roda	23	Staten Island, New York
The Real World: St. Thomas	Robb Schreiber	21	Bensalem, Pennsylvania
The Real World: St. Thomas	Brandon Swift	22	Edison, New Jersey
The Real World: St. Thomas	Laura Waller	22	Omaha, Nebraska
The Real World: St. Thomas	Trey Weatherholtz	23	Baltimore, Maryland
The Real World: Portland	Jessica McCain	21	Fayetteville, North Carolina
The Real World: Portland	Anastasia Miller	22	Livonia, Michigan
The Real World: Portland	Joi Neimeyer	22	Hansville, Washington
The Real World: Portland	Johnny Reilly	21	West Bridgewater, Massachusetts
The Real World: Portland	Averey Tressler	21	Phoenix, Arizona
The Real World: Portland	Marlon Williams	24	Pflugerville, Texas
The Real World: Portland	Jordan Wiseley	22	Mustang, Oklahoma
The Real World: Portland	Daisy (dog)	1	Phoenix, Arizona
The Real World: Portland	Nia Moore	23	Atlanta, Georgia
Real World: Ex-Plosion	Thomas Buell	21	Fort Worth, Texas
Real World: Ex-Plosion	Jenny Delich	23	Los Angeles, California
Real World: Ex-Plosion	Jay Mitchell	26	Bronx, New York
Real World: Ex-Plosion	Jamie Larson	22	Houston, Texas
Real World: Ex-Plosion	Ashley Mitchell	26	San Francisco, California
Real World: Ex-Plosion	Arielle Scott	24	San Francisco, California
Real World: Ex-Plosion	Cory Wharton	22	Los Angeles, California
Real World: Ex-Plosion	Ashley Ceaser	26	Oakland, California
Real World: Ex-Plosion	Brian Williams, Jr.	26	Kansas City, Missouri
Real World: Ex-Plosion	Hailey Chivers	21	Fort Worth, Texas
Real World: Ex-Plosion	Jenna Compono	20	Wantagh, New York
Real World: Ex-Plosion	Lauren Ondersma	23	Brooklyn, New York
Real World: Skeletons	Bruno Bettencourt	24	East Providence, Rhode Island
Real World: Skeletons	Sylvia Elsrode	25	Kansas City, Missouri
Real World: Skeletons	Jason Hill	24	Fayetteville, North Carolina
Real World: Skeletons	Violetta Milerman	23	Sarasota, Florida
Real World: Skeletons	Tony Raines	26	Metairie, Louisiana
Real World: Skeletons	Madison Walls	23	Austin, Texas
Real World: Skeletons	Nicole Zanatta	23	Staten Island, New York
Real World: Go Big or Go Home	Kailah Casillas	22	Fort Myers, Florida
Real World: Go Big or Go Home	Chris Ammon Hall	23	Brooklyn, New York
Real World: Go Big or Go Home	CeeJai' Jenkins	23	Atlanta, Georgia
Real World: Go Big or Go Home	Sabrina Kennedy	21	Topsfield, Massachusetts
Real World: Go Big or Go Home	Dione Mariani	24	Cape Cod, Massachusetts
Real World: Go Big or Go Home	Dean Bart-Plange	25	Los Angeles, California
Real World: Go Big or Go Home	Jenna Thomason	22	Easley, South Carolina
Real World: Go Big or Go Home	Dylan Moore	24	Charlotte, North Carolina
Real World Seattle: Bad Blood	Anika Rashaun	24	Harlem, New York
Real World Seattle: Bad Blood	Jordan Anderson	21	Chicago, Illinois
Real World Seattle: Bad Blood	Katrina Stack	23	Micanopy, Florida
Real World Seattle: Bad Blood	Mike Crescenzo	25	New York, New York
Real World Seattle: Bad Blood	Robbie Padovano	22	Morganville, New Jersey
Real World Seattle: Bad Blood	Theo Bradley	23	Kankakee, Illinois
Real World Seattle: Bad Blood	Tyara Hooks	21	Alpharetta, Georgia
Real World Seattle: Bad Blood	Anna Stack	25	Orlando, Florida
Real World Seattle: Bad Blood	Jennifer Geoghan	24	Hoboken, New Jersey
Real World Seattle: Bad Blood	Kassius Bass	21	Charleston, Illinois
Real World Seattle: Bad Blood	Kimberly Johansson	23	Atlanta, Georgia
Real World Seattle: Bad Blood	Orlana Russell	21	Ypsilanti, Michigan
Real World Seattle: Bad Blood	Peter Romeo	24	Deerfield Beach, Florida
Real World Seattle: Bad Blood	Will Groomes III	24	Philadelphia, Pennsylvania
The Real World: Atlanta	Arely Avitua	21	Midwest
The Real World: Atlanta	Clint Wright	28	Potterville, Michigan
The Real World: Atlanta	Dondre Randolph	25	Houston, Texas
The Real World: Atlanta	Justin Blu	26	Atlanta, Georgia
The Real World: Atlanta	Meagan Melancon	23	Baton Rouge, Louisiana
The Real World: Atlanta	Tovah Marx	27	Scottsdale, Arizona
The Real World: Atlanta	Yasmin Almokhamad	27	New York City, New York

^{^[I]} Cast member's age at the start of the season
