= Criticism of reality television =

Criticism of the reality television genre

The reality television genre, and specific reality television shows, have been subject to significant criticism since the genre first rose to worldwide popularity in the 1990s. Much of the criticism has centered on the use of the word "reality" and such shows' attempt to present themselves as a straightforward recounting of events that have occurred. Critics have argued that reality television shows do not accurately reflect real life; rather, they fabricate details via misleading editing, coaching participants on what to say and how to behave, generating storylines ahead of time and staging or re-staging scenes for the cameras.

Other criticisms of reality television shows include that they are intended to humiliate or exploit participants (particularly on competition shows), that they make celebrities out of untalented people who do not deserve fame and that they glamorize vulgarity and materialism. Actor and filmmaker Gary Oldman described reality television as "the museum of social decay", while journalist Ted Koppel questioned whether it marked "the end of civilization".

== "Reality" as misnomer ==
The authenticity of reality television is often called into question by its detractors. The genre's title of "reality" is often criticized as being inaccurate because of claims that the genre frequently includes premeditated scripting, acting, urgings from behind-the-scenes crew to create specified situations of adversity and drama, and misleading editing. For these reasons and more, there has been controversy over the extent to which reality television truly reflects reality.

In many cases, the entire premise of the show is a contrived one, based around a competition or another unusual situation. However, various shows have additionally been accused of using fakery in order to create more compelling television, such as having premeditated storylines and in some cases feeding participants lines of dialogue, focusing only on participants' most outlandish behavior, and altering events through editing and re-shoots.

The 2004 VH1 program Reality TV Secrets Revealed detailed various misleading tricks of reality TV producers. According to the show, various reality shows (notably Joe Millionaire) combined audio and video from different times, or from different sets of footage, to create a false chronology and distort participant behavior and actions.

An episode of the NBC drama Harry's Law used the industry jargon "Franken-bites" and gave an example of the audio-splicing trick, which is used to force dialogue that is needed for the drama/story/script, but not actually said by the cast members.

In docusoap programming, which follows people in their daily life, producers may be highly deliberate in their editing strategies, able to portray certain participants as heroes or villains, and may guide the drama through altered chronology and selective presentation of events. A Season 3 episode of Charlie Brooker's Screenwipe included a segment on the ways in which selective editing can be used to this end.

=== Unreal environments ===
In competition-based programs such as Big Brother and Survivor, and other special living environment shows like The Real World, the producers design the format of the show and control the day-to-day activities and the environment, creating a completely fabricated world in which the competition plays out. Producers specifically select the participants and use carefully designed scenarios, challenges, events, and settings to encourage particular behaviors and conflicts. Mark Burnett, creator of Survivor and other reality shows, has agreed with this assessment, and avoids the word "reality" to describe his shows; he has said, "I tell good stories. It really is not reality TV. It really is unscripted drama."

=== Wardrobe handling ===
Some shows, such as Survivor, do not allow the participants to wear clothing of their own choosing while on camera, to promote the participants' wearing of "camera-friendly colors" and to prevent the participants from wearing the same style and/or color of clothing. Additionally, some prohibit clothing with corporate logos.

=== Scripting and staging ===
Reality television shows have faced speculation that the participants themselves are involved in fakery, acting out storylines that have been planned in advance by producers. The Hills is one notable example: the show faced allegations that its plots are scripted ahead of time. During the second season of Hell's Kitchen, it was speculated that the customers eating meals prepared by the contestants were in fact paid actors.

Daniel Petrie Jr., president of the Writers Guild of America-West, stated in 2004, "We look at reality TV, which is billed as unscripted, and we know it is scripted. We understand that shows don't want to call the writers writers because they want to maintain the illusion that it is reality, that stuff just happens."

Various alumni of the MTV reality series The Real World have related incidents in which the producers staged or attempted to stage incidents for the cameras. During a reunion show featuring the first four Real World casts, Heather Gardner, of the original New York cast, questioned members of the San Francisco cast if their situations were real, noting that situations from the original season seemed to repeat themselves in subsequent ones. On an edition of the E! True Hollywood Story that spotlighted the series, cast member Jon Brennan revealed that he was asked by the producers to state on the air that he felt hatred towards housemate Tami Roman for her decision to have an abortion, and that he refused to do so, stating that although he disagreed with her decision, he did not feel hatred towards her. Lars Schlichting of The Real World: London related an instance in which roommate Mike Johnson asked a question when cameras were not present, and then asked the same question five minutes later when cameras were present, which Schlichting added was not typical of Johnson. Producers have also been accused of selectively editing material in order to give the false impression of certain emotional reactions or statements from the castmates. New York cast member Rebecca Blasband says producers paid a man $100 to ask her out on a date, and that she terminated that plan when she learned of it. She also says that a heated argument she and Kevin Powell had in the seventh episode of that season was edited to make both of them appear more extreme.

Various participants on the 2004-2007 show Pimp My Ride, which shows cars in poor condition being restored and customized in order to match their owners' interests, have stated that elements of the show were faked. These include cars getting their paint removed and additional litter put in before taping in order to make their starting condition look worse; cars getting outfitted with elements that were removed right after taping, like a robotic arm; and contestants being coached to act very enthusiastically after the final "reveal". Participants have also said that the overhaul process, implied in the show to last no more than a few days, actually lasted 6–8 months.

Professional wrestler Hulk Hogan, whose family starred in the reality series Hogan Knows Best and Brooke Knows Best, explains in his 2009 autobiography My Life Outside the Ring that paying unionized camera crews to film subjects continuously until something telegenic or dramatic occurs would be prohibitively expensive, and that as a result, such shows are "soft-scripted", and follow a tightly regimented shooting schedule that allows for typical work-related considerations such as lunch breaks. When filming soft-scripted shows, the subjects are given a scenario by the producers to act out, perhaps an exaggerated version of something likely to be encountered in their real lives, are informed of the outcome, and possible "beats" in between, and instructed to improvise, which Hogan says is a version of what he did as a professional wrestler. According to Hogan, this would result in behavior that members of his family would never exhibit in real life, as when his son, Nick tossed water balloons at neighbors from a window, or when his wife would wake up early to apply makeup and do her hair before camera crews arrived to film shots of the couple sleeping.

Multiple takes of scenes can be shot in reality shows. Known examples include scenes on Extreme Makeover: Home Edition in which families learn that they have been selected to receive a home makeover, and some scenes in The Real Housewives of New York City.

Mike Fleiss, creator of The Bachelor and The Bachelorette, as well as former contestants, have stated that both shows are scripted. The Bachelorette Season 4 winner, Jesse Csincsak, stated that contestants on those series are required to follow producers' orders, and that storylines are fabricated in the editing room. Season 13 participant Megan Parris related, "I don't think [the producers] showed any real conversation I had with anyone... The viewers fail to realize that editing is what makes the show... You'll hear someone make one comment and then they'll show a clip of somebody's face to make it look like that is their facial reaction to that statement, but really, somebody made that face the day before to something else. It's just piecing things together to make a story." Parris also stated that producers "bully" and berate contestants into saying specific things to the camera that the contestants do not wish to say. Fleiss stated in an appearance on 20/20 that he develops the show's contestants into characters that will cater to his audience's tastes and that they "need [their] fair share of villains every season." On February 24, 2012, during the filming of The Women Tell All episode of The Bachelor Season 16, what should have been a private conversation between contestant Courtney Robertson and one of the show's producers went public when the microphones were accidentally left on in between camera takes. The leaked conversation revealed the producer's role as an acting coach who was encouraging Robertson to fake certain emotions for the camera which she was not feeling.

The History series Pawn Stars depicts three generations of the Harrison family working at their family-owned Gold & Silver Pawn Shop in Las Vegas. However, as a result of the filming that takes place there, the four main cast members no longer work the counter, due to laws that require the identity of customers pawning items to remain confidential, and the tourists and fans taking photos and video in the showroom that would preclude this. When shooting episodes of the series, the shop is temporarily closed, with only a handful of customers allowed into the showroom.

Dave Hester, one of the stars of the A&E series Storage Wars, filed a lawsuit against A&E in December 2012, saying that he was fired after he complained to the network and the production company that produces the show that the series is staged. According to Hester, the items that are seen in the abandoned storage containers that are acquired by the series' cast are appraised in advance before being planted in the containers by A&E, which pays for storage lockers for "weaker" cast members, scripts the cast member interviews, and stages the auctions seen on the show. A&E denied the accusation, saying that the show is entirely authentic.

On February 4, 2013, Russell Jay, a producer on the series Keeping Up with the Kardashians, stated in a 165-page deposition in the divorce proceedings of star Kim Kardashian and her husband, Kris Humphries, that at least two of the scenes that were shot for that series were scripted, reshot or edited in order to cast Humphries in a negative light following Kardashian's decision to divorce him.

=== Misleading premise ===
The very premise of some reality shows has been called into question. The winner of the first season, in 2003, of America's Next Top Model, Adrianne Curry, claimed that part of the grand prize she received, a modeling contract with Revlon, was for a much smaller amount of work than what was promised throughout the show. During the airing of the first season of A Shot at Love with Tila Tequila, in which a group of both men and women vied for the heart of Tila Tequila, there were rumors that its star was not only heterosexual, but also had a boyfriend already. The show's winner, Bobby Banhart, claimed that he never saw Ms. Tequila again after the show finished taping, and that he was not given her telephone number.

The international franchise Dragons' Den, which shows entrepreneurs vying to get investments from wealthy businessmen, has sometimes been accused of misleading viewers as to the seriousness of the deals being made. A 2016 analysis of the American installment of the franchise, Shark Tank, found that, of 237 deals shown being made, 43% did not lead to any sort of investment, and another 30% did occur but under different terms than what was agreed to on the show. An analysis of one season (2017) of the Australian installment, also called Shark Tank, found an even worse outcome, with only 4 of 27 investment deals shown on the show actually coming to fruition. A 2019 analysis of two seasons of the British installment, Dragons' Den, found that nearly half of the deals made on the show did not result in any actual investment.

=== Counter-reasoning ===
Misha Kavka argues in the book Spectacle of the Real: From Hollywood to Reality TV and Beyond that even though the contestants are in a fabricated setting and the situation has been set up for a certain outcome, as in shows such as The Bachelor and The Bachelorette, what emerges on the screen is still grounded in reality. King writes:

I would argue, rather, that the simulated setting stimulates feeling, in part because the removal of the participants from their normal surroundings strips them to nothing but the space and affect of social interaction. The intimacy that arises out of this amplified situation is real – both for the participants and for the viewers.

== Well-being and treatment of participants ==
Reality shows have been criticized for their impact on the mental and emotional health of contestants, several of whom have attempted or committed suicide. Since 2018, the producers of Love Island have given contestants mandatory mental health assessments following the conclusion of the show, as well as the option to participate in eight counseling sessions.

=== Spectacle of humiliation ===
Some have claimed that the success of reality television is due to its ability to provide schadenfreude, by satisfying the desire of viewers to see others humiliated. American magazine Entertainment Weekly wrote, "Do we watch reality television for precious insight into the human condition? Please. We watch for those awkward scenes that make us feel a smidge better about our own little unfilmed lives." Media analyst Tom Alderman wrote, "There is a sub-set of Reality TV that can only be described as Shame TV because it uses humiliation as its core appeal." A particularly infamous example of this "Shame TV" trend is 2014's I Wanna Marry "Harry", in which a cast of women attempt to win the charms of who they believe to be Prince Harry, but who is actually lookalike Matt Hicks. Following the show's premiere and subsequent cancellation due to low ratings, the show's winner, Katherine Birch, came out to Splinter News about how she and the other contestants were effectively gaslighted to believe that Hicks was in fact the prince, including being isolated in hotel rooms with no means of entertainment or communication for the week prior to filming and having a therapist (actually a member of the production crew) come on set and consult with contestants who still weren't convinced of "Harry's" legitimacy. Television critic James Poniewozik has disagreed with this assessment, writing, "for all the talk about 'humiliation TV,' what's striking about most reality shows is how good humored and resilient most of the participants are: the American Idol rejectees stubbornly convinced of their own talent, the Fear Factor players walking away from vats of insects like Olympic champions. What finally bothers their detractors is, perhaps, not that these people are humiliated but that they are not."

Allegations of violations of human dignity and human rights during reality TV has been a concern addressed by the Council of Europe.

=== Participation of children ===
Criticism, and a legal inquiry, were raised regarding the participation of the Gosselin children in the 2007–2011 series Jon & Kate Plus 8 (later renamed Kate Plus 8), as to whether or not the children were exploited or were under emotional distress. At the time the show was being filmed there were no clear laws in Pennsylvania (where the Gosselins resided) regarding a child's appearance on a reality show. However, Pennsylvania law permits children who are at least seven years old to work in the entertainment industry, as long as certain guidelines are followed and a permit is obtained. For example, children may not work after 11:30 PM under most circumstances, or perform in any location that serves alcohol. Both parents defended the children's involvement, stating they were happy and healthy. TLC released a statement saying that the network "fully complies with all applicable laws and regulations" to produce the show.

The 2009 balloon boy hoax, in which a father pretended that his six-year-old son was caught in an out-of-control helium balloon, reportedly in order to get publicity in order to get the family back into the reality-show business (after two appearances on ABC's Wife Swap), also raised questions about the exploitation of children. In an interview with the Denver Post, child psychologist Alan Zimmerman said, "Using your family or children to please the masses, or producers of mass entertainment who want ratings and a good bottom line, is inherently risky […] They are by definition a commodity in a profit-oriented business." The same article quoted psychologist Jamie Huysman as saying, "It is exploitation […] Nobody wants to watch normal behavior. Kids have to be co-conspirators to get the camera to stay on."

=== Treatment of writers ===
Writers for reality television do not receive union pay-scale compensation and union representation, which significantly decreases expenditures for producers and broadcasters.

== Negative political and cultural impact ==
The Chinese singing competition Super Girl (a local imitation of Pop Idol) was criticized by the Chinese government for its political and cultural impact. After the finale of the show's 2005 season drew an audience of around 400 million people, and 8 million text message votes, the state-run English-language newspaper Beijing Today ran the front-page headline "Is Super Girl a Force for Democracy?" The Chinese government criticized the show, citing both its democratic nature and its excessive vulgarity, or "worldliness", and in 2006 banned it outright. It was later reintroduced in 2009, before being banned again in 2011. Super Girl has also been criticized by non-government commentators for creating seemingly impossible ideals that may be harmful to Chinese youth.

In Indonesia, reality television shows have surpassed soap operas as the most-watched programs on the air. One popular program is Jika Aku Menjadi ("If I Were"), which follows young, middle-class people as they are temporarily placed into lower-class life, where they learn to appreciate their circumstances back home by experiencing daily life for the less fortunate. Critics have claimed that this and similar programs in Indonesia reinforce traditionally Western ideals of materialism and consumerism. However, Eko Nugroho, reality show producer and president of Dreamlight World Media, insists that these reality shows are not promoting American lifestyles but rather reaching people through their universal desires.

== Product placement ==
Product placement, whereby companies and corporations pay to have their products included in television programming for marketing purposes, is highly prevalent in reality television.

The following is a list of prime-time television shows with the most instances of product placement during 2011, according to Nielsen Media Research. Nine out of the ten are reality television shows.

1. American Idol, 577 in 39 episodes
2. The Biggest Loser, 533 in 34 episodes
3. The Celebrity Apprentice, 391 in 12 episodes
4. Dancing with the Stars, 390 in 29 episodes
5. The X Factor, 312 in 26 episodes
6. Extreme Makeover: Home Edition, 224 in 31 episodes
7. America's Got Talent, 220 in 32 episodes
8. Friday Night Lights, 201 in 13 episodes
9. America's Next Top Model, 178 in 26 episodes
10. The Amazing Race, 161 in 11 episodes

== Undeserved celebrity ==
Reality television has the potential to turn its participants into national celebrities, at least for a short period. This is most notable in talent-search programs such as the Idol and X Factor series, which have spawned music stars in many of the countries in which they have aired. Many other shows, however, have made at least temporary celebrities out of their participants; some participants have then been able to parlay this fame into media and merchandising careers. Reality TV contestants are sometimes derided as "Z-list celebrities", "Bravolebrities", and/or "nonebrities" who are effectively "famous for being famous," yet who have done nothing to warrant this sudden fame. Some have been lampooned for exploiting an undeserved "15 minutes of fame". The Kardashian family is one such group of reality television personalities who were subject to this criticism in the 2010s.

== See also ==
- Quiz show scandals
- Great Reality TV Swindle
- List of reality television programs
- Low culture
- Media manipulation
- Scripted reality
