= Bill Richmond (director) =

American television director (born 1951)

- Born: William Wood Richmond Jr. 1958 (age 67–68); Huntington, New York, US
- Occupations: Television producer, director, editor, cinematographer

Bill Richmond (born 1958) is an American television producer, director, and editor. His work has appeared on MTV, VH1, Discovery, LOGO, CMT and NBC. Among other projects, he has served as producer, director, editor and/or cinematographer for numerous documentary episodes for MTV's True Life series including "True Life: I'm Gay and I'm Getting Married" and "True Life: I'm Working My Way Out of Poverty", NBC's "Last Comic Standing", Discovery channel's "Wreckreation Nation", Time-Life's "The History of Rock 'n' Roll - The 70's Have a Nice Decade" and the MTV documentary series Sex in the 90s.

In 2018, Richmond was the producer and director of photography for "Parkland Rising", which won the Audience Award for Best Documentary at the 2019 Woodstock Film Festival. He received an Emmy Award in 2009 for his work on MTV's True Life documentary series. He was awarded a GLAAD Award in 2005 for "True Life: I'm Gay and I'm Getting Married".

Richmond was a director on the first season of the MTV reality television series The Real World: New York in 1992. His association with that series came to an end when he moved on-screen and became romantically involved with one of the cast, Rebecca Blasband, when the show vacationed in Jamaica. This incident led to the establishment of a production rule preventing crew members from associating socially with the cast.
