= Larry Aubry =

American columnist and activist (1933–2020)

- Born: 1933; New Orleans, Louisiana, U.S.
- Died: May 16, 2020 (aged 86)
- Education: University of California, Los Angeles
- Occupations: Columnist, activist
- Spouse: Gloria Aubry
- Children: 5, including Erin Aubry Kaplan

Larry Aubry (1933 – May 16, 2020) was a columnist for the Los Angeles Sentinel for 33 years, and an African-American activist in South Central Los Angeles.

== Early life and education ==
Aubry was born in New Orleans in 1933 and moved to Los Angeles at the age of nine. He attended both Jefferson High School and Fremont High School, and later graduated from UCLA with a degree in psychology. He also did graduate work at the University of Southern California.

== Career ==
As an activist, Aubry focused his work on improving conditions for dangerously disenfranchised Black communities through coalition-building with other cultural and ethnic groups. His activism was spurred by his early experiences at Fremont High School in the 1940s, where he was one of the first Black people to attend. As Charlotta Bass also documents in her book, Forty Years: Memoirs from the Pages of a Newspaper, Black people were being hung in effigy from trees outside the school to protest integration. Aubry went on to become a social service worker, mainly in probation, but in a long career of community activism, at various times he was a member of the Inglewood School Board; a vice-president and education chair of the L.A. NAACP; a board member of Multicultural Collaborative and the Inglewood Coalition for Drug and Violence Prevention; a vice-president of the A. Philip Randolph Institute; and a member of the Reparations United Front and the committee to Save King Drew Medical Center. He also was involved in leadership positions with Advocates for Black Strategic Alternatives, the Black Community Clergy and Labor Alliance, and Black Lives Matter.

He began writing for the Los Angeles Sentinel in the early 1980s and was honored by the Southern California Library in 2005 in recognition of a lifetime of being unafraid to speak the truth, building bridges, and working to bring justice to Los Angeles through his outstanding journalism as a columnist for the Sentinel. Aubry regularly contributed articles about the lives of Black people living in Los Angeles to the LA Progressive, He was also a contributor to the LA Progressive until his death in May 2020.

== Personal life ==
Aubry was married to his wife Gloria for 64 years, and had five children including the writer Erin Aubry Kaplan
