= Ernie Paniccioli =

American hip hop photographer

- Born: February 26, 1947 (age 79); Brooklyn, New York, U.S.
- Other name: Brother Ernie
- Known for: hip hop photography
- Website: erniepaniccioli.com

Ernie Paniccioli (born February 26, 1947) is an American photographer of hip hop culture who lives in Jersey City, New Jersey. He was inducted into the Hip Hop Hall of Fame in 2014.

A Cree Native American, Paniccioli grew up in Brooklyn, New York. Paniccioli's photography of hip hop began in the 1970s with shots of graffiti in New York while working for the telephone company.

He was the chief photographer for Word Up! Magazine beginning in 1987, and his work has also appeared in The New York Times, Life, Rolling Stone, Spin, Ebony, and The Source.

Hip hop journalist Kevin Powell encouraged Paniccioli to make a book and in 2002 Who Shot Ya? : Three Decades of Hip-Hop Photography was published, followed by Hip-Hop at the End of the World: The Photography of Brother Ernie in 2018. He donated his photography archive to Cornell University's Hip Hop Collection in 2012 and it was made available online in August 2020.

== Personal life ==
Paniccioli grew up in Bedford-Stuyvesant, Brooklyn and left home as a teenager. He spent time in Greenwich Village and learned about art from singer Richie Havens. He was in the Navy for six years and returned to New York, marrying and having a child.

== Gallery shows ==
- "Hip Hop: A History in Photographs", Minor Injury, New York City. September 1992-January 1993. 12 images shown.
- "Roots, Rhymes, and Rage: The Hip Hop Story", The Rock and Roll Hall of Fame and Museum, Cleveland, Ohio. November 1999-August 2000. Approximately 25 images shown.
- "Hip Hop Nation: Roots, Rhymes, and Rage", Brooklyn Museum of Art, Brooklyn, New York. September–December 2000. Approximately 40 images shown.
- "When Angels Speak of Love", Prosper Gallery, New York City. April–May 2002. Approximately 30 images
- "100 Shots to the Dome", New York City Urban Experience Cultural Center and Art Gallery. October–November 2002. Approximately 100 images shown.
- "Who Shot Ya?", VH1 Corporate Headquarters Gallery, New York City. February–May 2003. 50 images shown.
- "Who Shot Ya?", APEX Museum, Atlanta, Georgia. May–June 2003. 50 images shown.
- "Saturday Night/Sunday Morning", Leica Gallery, New York City. May–June 2003. 2 images shown.
- "Who Shot Ya?", Punch Gallery, San Francisco, California. November–December 2003. 40 images shown.
- "Urban Blight: The Graffiti Photographs of Ernie Paniccioli," Eyejammie Fine Arts Gallery, New York, May 20-July 1, 2004.

"Roots, Rhymes, and Rage: The Hip Hop Story", The Rock and Roll Hall of Fame and Museum, Cleveland, Ohio. November 1999-August 2000. Approximately 25 images shown 40 Years of Hip Hop Photography, Gladstone • "Hip Hop: A History in Photographs", Minor Injury, New York City. September 1992-January 1993. 12 images shown. • Jersey City, City Hall, 2014
