= The Real World Homecoming: New York =

Spin-off miniseries of The Real World

- Season 1
- Starring: Norman Korpi; Julie Gentry; Becky Blasband; Kevin Powell; Andre Comeau; Heather Gardner; Eric Nies
- No. of episodes: 6

Release
- Original network: Paramount+
- Original release: March 4 – April 8, 2021

Season chronology
- Next → The Real World Homecoming: Los Angeles

The Real World Homecoming: New York is the 2021 first season of the spin-off The Real World: Homecoming miniseries of The Real World, that reunited the cast of the first season of the show to live in the same New York loft they lived in for the original series, nearly 30 years after filming ended.

This Homecoming edition of the show is the second reunion edition of the show (following Reunited: The Real World Las Vegas) and depicts the original cast members from 1992 moving back into the same loft in which they lived in 1992, with the exception of Eric Nies, who participated virtually after testing positive for COVID-19. Rebecca "Becky" Blasbard left the loft halfway through the season and did not return to it, though she appeared on the series for its entirety.

The cast members reflected on their time filming the first season and discussed ways in which their experiences affected their lives, and those of their families. The cast also discussed ways in which the culture had changed their views on things such as race relations from their time filming the inaugural season in 1992, and how society was reflected in the modern state of reality television, of which they expressed critical views.

== Episodes ==
No. overall	No. in season	Title	Original release date
1	1	"Back to Reality"	March 4, 2021
The cast reunites in the same loft where they lived together in the original series. Everyone is shocked to discover Eric is forced to participate remotely since he has contracted Coronavirus.
2	2	"The More Things Change..."	March 11, 2021
The cast watch a variety of clips from the original series together, including heated arguments between them about racism. Becky and Kevin begin to discuss the topic, and it becomes clear to the others that Becky has experienced limited growth on the topic.
3	3	"Listen"	March 18, 2021
After arguing once again about racism, Becky gets upset because castmates are not supportive of her views. She exits the show in anger.
4	4	"Starting Over"	March 25, 2021
After Becky's departure, the group talk about conflict resolution and some of the obstacles they have overcome in the last 25 years. Norm reveals that his art career has stalled and he is working in a bakery and living with family. Everyone rallies to figure out how they can help him.
5	5	"It's About All of Us"	April 1, 2021
The group continues to discuss Becky's departure. Julie has a brief visit with Becky outside of the house, and Becky continues to feel attacked. Norm discusses being one of the first openly gay people on television and how it affected his life. Kevin has a video chat with Becky, and she refuses to listen, causing Kevin to want to leave the show.
6	6	"From the Real World to the New World"	April 8, 2021
