= The Wedding Video =

The Wedding Video may refer to two films:

- The Wedding Video (2003 film), an American mockumentary
- The Wedding Video (2012 film), a British comedy film
