= The Real World: Paris =

Coordinates: 48°53′18″N 02°07′32″E

- Season 13
- The cast of The Real World: Paris
- Starring: Chris Tamburello; Adam King; Christina Trainor; Simon Sherry-Wood; Leah Gillingwater; Ace Amerson; Mallory Snyder
- No. of episodes: 24

Release
- Original network: MTV
- Original release: June 3 – November 4, 2003

Season chronology
- ← Previous; The Real World: Las Vegas Next → The Real World: San Diego

The Real World: Paris is the thirteenth season of MTV's reality television series The Real World, which focuses on a group of diverse strangers living together for several months in a different city each season, as cameras follow their lives and interpersonal relationships. It is the only season to be filmed in France.

The season featured seven people living in a four-story château and is the second of four seasons of The Real World to be filmed entirely outside of the United States after The Real World: London in 1995, and before The Real World: Sydney in 2007, and The Real World: Cancun in 2009.

The season was filmed over 120 days from January 19 to May 18, 2003. The season premiered on June 3 of that year and consisted of 25 episodes.

== Assignment ==
Almost every season of The Real World, beginning with its fifth season, has included the assignment of a season-long group job or task to the housemates, continued participation in which has been mandatory to remain part of the cast since the tenth season. The Paris cast was assigned to write reviews for Frommer's, reviewing various Paris bars, clubs and other attractions. A weekly bonus would be given to the housemates if they all completed their weekly assignments, which they rarely did. In fact, two of the castmates, Chris "C.T." Tamburello and Leah Gillingwater, were caught submitting fake reviews.

== The residence ==
The four-story 5,382-square-foot (500.0 m^{2}) Château was built in 1869, and is located in Le Vésinet, a commune of France in the western suburbs of Paris, France. It is located 10.2 miles (16.4 km) from the center of Paris. Le Vésinet is one of the wealthiest suburbs of Paris, known for its wooded avenues and bourgeois mansions built around boating lakes and English-Style gardens. In some of the rooms of the Château, fake walls were built to protect 18 carat gilding on the original surfaces. The Château includes a wine cellar.

== Cast ==
Cast member	Age^{1}	Hometown
Clyde Daryn "Ace" Amerson	24	Statesboro, Georgia
Ace is a senior marketing major in his sixth year at Georgia Southern University and a member of the Kappa Alpha Order fraternity. He co-owns three college bars back home where his girlfriend lives, and enjoys the drinking and partying that comes with that business. The death of his mother was a troubled time for him, but he has moved on.
Adam King	23	Beverly Hills, California
Adam is a graduate of Stanford University with a degree in communications, and an aspiring rap musician and lyricist who grew up in Beverly Hills, currently living in Los Angeles. His mother provided a stable home environment while his father, William King, toured with the 70's R&B group, The Commodores. A motivated and energetic young man, friends and family compare him to the Energizer Bunny. He is initially attracted to Mallory, though she does not reciprocate.
Chris "C.T." Tamburello	22	Methuen, Massachusetts
Chris, aka C.T., is currently pursuing a degree in Business Management at the University of Massachusetts Amherst and works nights as a bartender at a nightclub near his school. He believes there is nothing he cannot accomplish if he sets his mind to it. He is opinionated and confrontational and can have a very loose temper, at times to point of getting into fights with Adam, Christina, and Leah, and is a source for much tension in the house. C.T. and Christina do have a flirtatious relationship at one point, but it never comes into fruition.
Christina Trainor	24	Las Vegas, Nevada
Christina is a criminal justice graduate from the University of Nevada, Las Vegas. The child of a bi-racial relationship (her mother is Korean and her father is German), Christina is drawn to diversity in her life. With a stepfather in the military, Christina grew up a military brat and so has developed the ability to adapt to the environment around her. Her family moved away from Las Vegas, but she stayed and works as a cocktail waitress. She has breast implants. C.T. and Ace find her attractive, but nothing ever comes of it. She later becomes close friends with Mallory, Leah, and Simon.
Leah Gillingwater	22	Glen Cove, New York
Leah is a Long Island native and a graduate of the University of Maryland who aspires to a career in fashion and enjoys partying, shopping and expensive name brands. She is known as loud and boisterous, and is often the center of attention. She admits to at one time only dating men who drove expensive cars. Leah is first attracted to Ace, but he does not reciprocate. Known to be pugnacious, she ends up in fights with most of her roommates. Leah and Mallory click at first, but later their friendship seems to crumble, the height of their animosity coming to a head on their trip to Italy. Leah has a cancer scare though, which brings her close to Mallory and the rest of her roommates.
Mallory Snyder	19	Palatine, Illinois
Mallory is a 19-year-old freshman at Iowa State University. Described as "statuesque, athletic", her parents are pushing her to achieve in sports, but Mallory is struggling may want to explore life outside of athletics and gives up her soccer scholarship to move to Paris. She is single and is waiting to find love before she loses her virginity. Mallory's looks gain the attention of Adam and Ace.
Simon Sherry-Wood	18	Dublin, Ireland
A native of Ireland, Simon lives at home and goes to high school in a small village about an hour outside Dublin. His family's acceptance of his homosexuality has allowed Simon to live an open life; he has enjoyed the gay scene in Dublin since he was 16. Simon met his Spanish boyfriend on New Year's Eve, a few weeks before moving to Paris. Aware of the temptations of Paris nightlife, Simon plans to stay faithful. A working model with a flair for fashion, he intends to go to college, but has yet to apply to schools because he's unsure about his career goals.

^Note 1: Age at the time of filming.

== Episodes ==
No. overall	No. in season	Title	Original release date
263	1	"Episode 1"	June 3, 2003
The housemates arrive at their new Paris home. They include attractive Ace, 23; virginal Mallory, 19; Simon, 18, from Ireland; cocky Chris, 22; likeable Leah, 22; former cocktail waitress Christina, 24; and Adam, 23, whose father is in the Commodores. Discussions among the housemates discuss which couples will pair off.
264	2	"Episode 2"	June 3, 2003
The cast members head out to nightclubs to celebrate their first night in France. Leah finds herself attracted to Ace, but Ace is turned off by her smoking. Also, Adam is smitten with Mallory, but the infatuation fades when he learns the feeling isn't mutual.
265	3	"Episode 3"	June 10, 2003
The housemates learn that their jobs consist of putting together a student travel guide of Europe. Ace curses at a taxi driver and expresses his difficulty adjusting to France. Christina and C.T. flirt in the hot tub express their mutual attraction later that night.
266	4	"Episode 4"	June 17, 2003
Mallory and Ace try to escape from the cameraman shadowing them and share a kiss. Mallory also loses her purse, which contains Leah's passport, though she later finds it. Adam apologizes to Leah for his behavior in an earlier episode, when he humiliated her in front of the group by saying she wasn't good-looking enough to attract a guy like Ace.
267	5	"Episode 5"	June 24, 2003
C.T. has a run-in with Christina, who he believes is eating his food and drinking his alcohol. Christina and the other housemates comment on C.T.'s lack of manners and overall rude behavior. Meanwhile, Mallory frets about kissing Ace and finally gets things off her chest with Leah, telling her she has a crush on Ace.
268	6	"Episode 6"	July 1, 2003
Tension begins to build between Leah and Mallory. Leah's brother Pascual flies in to visit and is well liked by the other housemates, especially Mallory. After he leaves, Mallory and Leah begin to discuss their conflict, which ends in a hug.
269	7	"Episode 7"	July 8, 2003
The housemates begin their assignment for Frommer's, which is to research local nightclubs, restaurants, hotels, stores and landmarks, then write reviews for travelers their age. A crucial condition of the job is that they will not be paid unless all housemates contribute reviews. Adam spends his time flirting with girls on the street, then later bumps into a girl from high school, and spends some romantic time with her friend. Leah and Adam's contributions are submitted on time while C.T., Ace and Kristina miss their deadline, and Mallory and Simon are given a reprieve due to illness. Only Leah and Adam get the bonus, although all housemates get paid.
270	8	"Episode 8"	July 15, 2003
Leah and Christina are becoming increasingly annoyed with C.T.'s attitude and sloppy habits around the house. To make amends, a drunk C.T. asks his brother to order tulips for the girls on Valentine's Day. When he sees the flowers, C.T. does not remember them. Leah receives an email from her friend Chris in America asking if she got the flowers, prompting her to understand that the flowers are from him, and that C.T. is lying (despite the fact that Christina received some too, and Leah's friend did not send her any).
271	9	"Episode 9"	July 22, 2003
Adam spends some romantic time with a Canadian girl he meets in a disco. He sees her again but stresses that seeing her on a regular basis will compromise his freedom. Frommer's editor Brice asks Christina to resubmit a previous piece of work and turn it in with the others' weekly assignment coordinated by C.T. When she turns it in ahead of the others, it causes dissension within the group. Bryce tells the housemates that going forward all individual work must submitted as one submission or no one will be paid.
272	10	"Episode 10"	July 29, 2003
Christina and Ace snuggle in her bed at night. The next morning she becomes angry when she finds out that somebody ate two of her last three eggs. Ace confesses to it but puts a couple lemons back in the egg carton dressed up as eggs as a "peace offering", prompting Christina to laugh it off. The housemates again struggle to complete their assignment on time. Despite the looming deadline, C.T. and Ace stay up all night and into the morning playing a high-stakes game of pool, disrupting Christina's ability to sleep, as her bedroom lies beneath the pool table.
273	11	"Episode 11"	August 5, 2003
With seconds to spare, C.T. turns in his portion of the Frommer's assignment on time. However, Leah learns from Bryce that only five "Finds" were included with the assignment (10 Tips and 10 Finds were required). Bryce informs Leah that the group will not get their bonuses, infuriating Leah and Christina. Christina changes her bedroom due to the pool table being right over her bed, which frustrates and disappoints Ace.
274	12	"Episode 12"	August 12, 2003
Tired of being the odd-man out with Leah and the others, C.T. attempts to make amends. Meanwhile, Adam goes to a gay bar with Simon and Mallory. Simon's boyfriend visits.
275	13	"Episode 13"	August 19, 2003
Ace's girlfriend, Kate arrives for a visit, though Ace is irritated when she refers to him as her "kind-of boyfriend". He later gets in a drunken argument with a cab driver. Adam is smitten with a girl on whom he spends considerable money, prompting Ace and C.T. to worry that she is exploiting him. Leah and Christina insist that Mallory change to a more fashionable shoe.
277	14	"Episode 14"	September 2, 2003
The housemates begin an eight-day vacation that includes stops in the French Riviera, Rome, Florence and Switzerland. First, however, they must finish an assignment about Paris nightlife. They finish on time and get their bonuses. C.T. misses the train to Nice, but shows up the next day, to everyone's irritation. Mallory's cousin and aunt visit, and Ace celebrates his 24th birthday.
278	15	"Episode 15"	September 9, 2003
The housemates arrive in Florence, where Leah and Simon go sightseeing and shopping. Leah has a date with Giuseppe, a waiter she meets at a restaurant. C.T. alienates some of the others when he arrives for dinner drunk.
279	16	"Episode 16"	September 16, 2003
The housemates conclude their vacation with stops in Rome and Zermatt, Switzerland, where they go snowboarding. Leah personality grates on Mallory, Christina and Simon, leading to an argument among the four of them in a restaurant, and their ejection from that establishment.
280	17	"Episode 17"	September 23, 2003
The roommates react to U.S. President George W. Bush's speech urging Iraqi President Saddam Hussein and his sons to leave Iraq, and the impending Iraq War. Ace, fed up with the back-and-forth bickering of his roommates, contemplates leaving.
281	18	"Episode 18"	September 30, 2003
C.T. nearly gets in a fight with another patron at a bar. He then turns his wrath on Adam, accusing him of being "two-faced". He later is enthused by the arrival of his girlfriend Jamie and her friend Wendy for a visit.
282	19	"Episode 19"	October 7, 2003
Christina and Wendy share concerns about C.T.'s aggressiveness, which in turn concerns Jamie. C.T.'s cousin Mike visits and urges him to dump Jamie. Leah receives a present in the mail from Giuseppe and decides to visit him in Florence. Mallory and Simon don't want to go with her, but Christina accompanies her instead.
283	20	"Episode 20"	October 14, 2003
Adam's friend Samir visits, and becomes friends with Leah, who's just returned from her weekend with Giuseppe. C.T. takes Christina to lunch in an attempt to mend their relationship.
284	21	"Episode 21"	October 21, 2003
Adam learns his father has left his mother. Leah's friend Stephanie arrives for a visit carrying letters from Leah's mother and doctor concerning a check-up she had before she came to Paris, which suggests cancer. Leah and Mallory bond when Leah pours out her fears.
285	22	"Episode 22"	October 28, 2003
Adam's new beau Lamyae, a blonde from Germany with moderate English skills, will not have sex with him until he commits to a relationship. In the meantime he spends a romantic night with Ashley, an American vacationing in Paris. The roommates are given an assignment to stay overnight in a hotel and review different rooms. Adam asks Lamyae to stay overnight in his room, but she leaves when Adam confesses about his night with Ashley. The housemates invite Bryce and David over for dinner, for which the girls are excited to prepare a big feast. C.T. blunders by inviting Lamyae and her friend to attend the dinner, creating an awkward moment when Adam has to tell her on the phone there isn't enough food for two more people. The next night Lamyae and her friend visit the house, but Adam retires to his room, wounded when Lamyae remarks that he follows Ace around like a dog."
286	23	"Episode 23"	November 4, 2003
Ace receives an e-mail from Kate that ends their relationship. He resumes his flirtation with Mallory. Ace convinces her and several others to visit his favorite strip club, but Mallory becomes upset by the attention he gives the dancers. Chris and Leah are paired together on an assignment to review a chateau, but they decide not to make an on-site visit.
287	24	"Episode 24"	November 4, 2003
As end of the housemates stay in Paris looms, they are tasked to submit essays on their Paris experience. Bryce interviews each one and asks the same question: "Did you actually write and/or research everything you submitted?" C.T. is honest and admits to his plagiarism of the chateau review. Leah admits to not visiting the chateau, but states on camera that she researched and wrote her review. Ace, Adam, Christina and Leah enjoy a nude dip in the hot tub. Everyone but C.T. heads out for a last night on the town.

== After filming ==
Six months after the cast left the Real World house, six of them, except for Simon, who was there via telephone, appeared to discuss their experiences both during and since their time on the show, French Kissing and Telling: The Real World Paris Reunion which premiered on November 11, 2003, and was hosted by La La Vazquez.

At the 2008 The Real World Awards Bash, Mallory was nominated in the "Hottest Female" category, CT in the "Hottest Male" one, and Adam for "Best Dance-Off".

Mallory Snyder later became a Sports Illustrated swimsuit model. She posed for the 2005 and 2006 Sports Illustrated Swimsuit Editions, and has also modeled for Abercrombie & Fitch and J. Crew.

Chris Tamburello's son, Christopher Junior, was born in 2016 and also appeared in an episode of Invasion of the Champions. In 2018, Tamburello married Lilianet Solares and their wedding aired on MTV as a two-week special. That same year, he appeared on Fear Factor alongside Cara Maria Sorbello from Fresh Meat II. He also starred in the movie Habitual directed by Johnny Hickey, which was released on November 13, 2020, and also featured Emilee Fitzpatrick from The Real World: Cancun and Sabrina Kennedy from Real World: Go Big or Go Home. In 2022, Tamburello filed for divorce from Solares. In 2024, Tamburello competed on and won the second season of The Traitors.

Leah Gillingwater has a son named Griffin.

Simon Sherry-Wood appeared as a member of the Scruff Pit Crew during season 6 of RuPaul's Drag Race.

=== The Challenge ===
Cast member	Seasons of The Challenge	Other appearances
Adam King	Battle of the Sexes 2, The Gauntlet 2, The Gauntlet III, The Duel II, The Ruins, Rivals	—N/a
Chris "C.T." Tamburello	The Inferno, The Inferno II, The Duel, The Inferno 3, The Gauntlet III, The Duel II, Rivals, Battle of the Exes, Rivals II, Free Agents, Battle of the Exes II, Invasion of the Champions, XXX: Dirty 30, Final Reckoning, War of the Worlds, War of the Worlds 2, Total Madness, Double Agents, Spies, Lies & Allies, Battle of the Eras, Vets & New Threats, Cutthroat (2026)	The Challenge: Champs vs. Pros, The Challenge: Champs vs. Stars (season 1), The Challenge: Champs vs. Stars (season 2)
Christina Trainor	—N/a	—N/a
Clyde Daryn "Ace" Amerson	The Inferno, Battle of the Sexes 2, The Gauntlet 2, The Inferno 3	The Challenge: All Stars (season 1), The Challenge: All Stars (season 4)
Leah Gillingwater	The Inferno	The Challenge: All Stars (season 2)
Mallory Snyder	The Inferno	—N/a
Simon Sherry-Wood	—N/a	—N/a

Note: CT made an appearance on Cutthroat (2010) and Battle for a New Champion for an elimination, and on Battle of the Bloodlines for a challenge and an elimination.
