= Simon Sherry-Wood =

American television personality

- Born: Simon Sherry-Wood; November 7, 1984 (age 41); Dublin, Ireland
- Occupations: Reality television personality; model; actor
- Television: The Real World: Paris; RuPaul's Drag Race

Simon Sherry-Wood (born November 7, 1984) is an Irish-born American television personality and model, best known for his appearances on The Real World and RuPaul's Drag Race.

== Career ==
Sherry-Wood started his career on a reality television series Real World. He was a cast member of The Real World: Paris in 2003. He later joined RuPaul's Drag Race as a pit crew member.

== Personal life ==
Born in Dublin, Ireland, Sherry-Wood emigrated to the United States in his early 20s, and became a naturalized American citizen in 2020.

== Filmography ==
Year	Title	Role	Notes
2003	The Real World: Paris	Himself	Appeared in 25 episodes
2003	The Real World You Never Saw: Paris	Himself	Documentary
2014	RuPaul's Drag Race	Himself	Appeared in 10 episodes
2014	Reality Relapse	Himself	Guest
