= Ari Fitz =

American model and vlogger (born 1989)

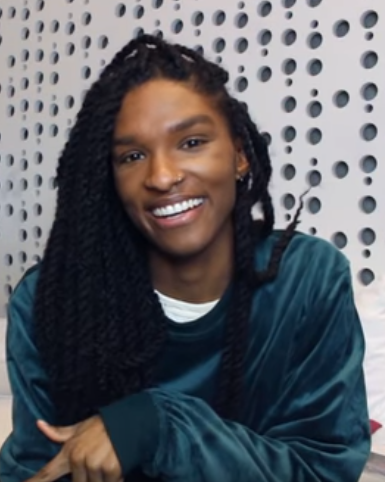
- Ari Fitz in January 2017
- Born: Arielle Scott; 1989 (age 36–37); Vallejo, California, US
- Occupations: YouTuber, model, film producer

YouTube information
- Channels: ARROWS; ARROWS
- Years active: 2013–present
- Subscribers: 251,000
- Views: 12,772,489 views

Arrows Fitz (born Arielle Scott; 1989), commonly known as Ari Fitz, is an American model, vlogger, television personality, and film producer. He (Note: Fitz uses he/him and they/them pronouns. This article uses he/him for consistency.) is best known for his YouTube channel Tomboyish, in which he explores topics related to being an androgynous person who presents as both masculine and feminine.

== Life and career ==
Fitz was born in 1989, in Vallejo, California. He attended University of California, Berkeley and received a degree in business, and began to model as an undergraduate. He has modeled for companies such as UGG and Kenzo, and appeared on a cover for Nylon.

Fitz created his YouTube channel when he was 23, and soon after appeared as a cast member on Real World: Ex-Plosion, at the time going by the name Arielle Scott. In 2016, Fitz moved to Los Angeles to pursue a full-time career in vlogging. Soon after arriving, he turned down a modeling contract at a well-known agency because the agency sought to control his YouTube content. Fitz began to vlog daily on his YouTube channel Tomboyish. The majority of the content is related to gender and sexuality. Fitz also produces short films that he posts to his channel, such as Bubbles, a scripted web series, and My Mama Wears Timbs, a short documentary about a masculine of center pregnant woman.

=== Accolades ===
Fitz received a nomination for Best Social Media in the LGBTQ+ YouTube Channel category at the 9th annual Shorty Awards. He was named on Pride.com's 2019 Pride 25 list.

== Personal life ==
Fitz is queer, transgender, and nonbinary. He uses he/him and they/them pronouns.
