= Mallory Snyder =

American TV personality and swimsuit model

Mallory Snyder (born January 7, 1984) is an American model and television personality best known for her participation on MTV's reality television program The Real World: Paris and her work as a swimsuit model for Sports Illustrated.

== Early life ==
Born in Palatine, Illinois Snyder is a 2002 graduate of William Fremd High School. Her father, Todd Snyder, played professional American football in the NFL for the Atlanta Falcons from 1970 to 1973.

== Career ==
=== The Real World ===
Snyder first appeared in the public eye when she appeared as a cast member on The Real World: Paris, which aired in 2003. Snyder was known on the show as a virgin who gave up her soccer scholarship at Iowa State University to participate in the taping of the show. Snyder's looks gained the attention of the males in the house, especially Adam King and Ace Amerson, the latter whom she eventually dated.

=== Modeling career ===
Upon returning from Paris, Snyder decided to try modeling and almost immediately found success, appearing in the 2005 and 2006 Sports Illustrated magazine's annual swimsuit issue. She has also modeled for the Abercrombie & Fitch and J.Crew clothing lines in addition to a 2006 appearance in Self magazine. In 2009 Mallory Snyder was voted USA Top Model of the year.

== Television appearances ==
Year	Title
2003	The Real World: Paris
2003	French Kissing and Telling: The Real World Paris Reunion
2004	Real World/Road Rules Challenge: The Inferno
