= The Wedding Video (2003 film) =

2003 film by Norman Korpi

- Directed by: Norman Korpi; Clint Cowen
- Written by: Norman Korpi; Clint Cowen
- Produced by: Sean Cooley
- Starring: Heather B. Julie Oliver; Norman Korpi; Rachel Campos-Duffy; Cory Murphy; Lars Schlichting; Mike Lambert; Sean Duffy; Syrus Yarbrough; Lindsay Brien
- Distributed by: TLA Releasing
- Release dates: April 10, 2003 (Philadelphia International Film Festival); May 21, 2003 (United States)
- Running time: 84 minutes
- Country: United States
- Language: English
- Budget: US$250,000 (estimated)

The Wedding Video is a 2003 mockumentary film starring, directed, and written by Norman Korpi and Clint Cowen. It was filmed in 1998 and completed in 2001, but was not released until 2003 by TLA Releasing.

The film stars a variety of alum from various seasons of the reality television show The Real World. Within the context of the film they ostensibly play themselves; however their "characters" (as perceived by viewers of The Real World) are exaggerated and various facts about their backgrounds and relationships with one another are altered or made fictional. The Real World itself is never mentioned.

== Plot ==
The film centers around Norman, who is soon to marry his boyfriend Sky. Norm's parents do not approve of this, but give him $10,000 to use for the wedding. With this money, he hires Clint, a professional wedding video director. He sends Clint out to videotape some of his best friends. This includes Julie, a naive country girl who is surprised to find out Norman is gay; and Heather B., a street-wise, egocentric African American woman who doesn't really care either way. The three were once roommates in New York City; they lived on Gay Street.

Other guests include Norm's Minnesotan lumberjack cousin Sean and his conservative-but-open-minded wife Rachel who is eight months pregnant, promiscuous stripper Cory, Norm's college buddy Syrus, and opinionated eurotrash DJ Lars. The group ultimately converges in Norm's castle in Los Angeles where pre-wedding festivities unfold.

Crises unfold when the wedding planner Norm has hired discovers he is gay and backs out; when her assistant secretly continues the gig, the planner cancels all of their catering and florists. Additionally it becomes evident to everyone at the wedding that Sky has a female mistress; Cory reveals that Sky is also a gay porn star.

Ultimately, the wedding goes off mostly without a hitch (thanks in part to Norman's obliviousness because he took ecstasy), and Clint edits the video down into a charming (if false) portrayal of a happy wedding.

== Cast ==
- Heather B. as Heather B.
- Lindsay Brien as Lindsay
- Sean Duffy as Sean
- Rachel Campos-Duffy as Rachel
- Norman Korpi as Norman
- Mike Lambert as Mike
- Cory Murphy as Cory
- Julie Oliver as Julie
- Lars Schlichting as Lars
- Syrus Yarbrough as Syrus
- Brien Perry as Sky
- Coral Smith as Coral
- Clint Cowen as Clint
- Pamela Blackwell as Pam
- Kirby Horwitz as Kirby
