= Norman Korpi =

American actor

- Born: Wakefield, Michigan, U.S.
- Occupations: Reality television personality, filmmaker, painter

Norman Korpi (born in Wakefield, Michigan) is an American painter, fashion designer, filmmaker and reality television star. He is best known for being one of the original cast members/roommates on the first season of the MTV reality show The Real World.

== Early life and career ==
Korpi grew up in Williamston, Michigan and began painting at an early age. By his early teens, he was painting murals on buildings in the city. He studied painting and photography at the Interlochen Arts Academy; and in 1985 he became a Presidential Scholar in the Arts. By the time of his graduation, one of his sculptures was a permanent part of the collection at the Grand Traverse Center for the Performing Arts.

Korpi studied photography at New York City's Cooper Union; and in 1988 he received full fellowship at Yale's Norfolk program.

In 1992, Korpi co-developed a clothing and furnishings design firm called Gouda. Their jacket outerwear line, called State to State, became popular enough to be sold at outlets like Sharper Image and Bloomingdales, and were worn in public by people including Barbara Bush and rapper Yo-Yo.

== The Real World ==
In May 1992, Korpi was chosen as one of the cast members on MTV's The Real World. The show was filmed in New York City, where Korpi was placed in a loft with six strangers (and his dog Gouda, the namesake of his design firm). His housemates included a female rapper, a fitness model, an alternative music singer and an aspiring dancer from Alabama. Korpi was one of the first openly gay people to appear on television, though the show portrayed him as being bisexual. One of the men Korpi dated was Charles Perez, who would later go on to host a talk show.

== After The Real World ==
Korpi has participated in a variety of Real World-related projects, including two seasons of The Real World/Road Rules Challenge.

He has branched off into commercial design. He began work in advertising and ultimately created Gay Entertainment Television. He has freelanced in production design for numerous television programs, including the Academy Awards.

In 1997, Korpi formed a production company called Fruit Films. Their first project was an independent film called The Wedding Video; it was a mockumentary about Korpi having a gay wedding, and the behind-the-scenes drama that unfolded. It featured many alumni of The Real World. The film was released in 2001.

Korpi revealed on episode four of The Real World Homecoming: New York that during the COVID-19 crisis of 2020 he had fallen into financial ruin, having lost all streams of income. At the time of filming he had lost his home and his possessions were being put on the street.
