= Hip Hop Hall of Fame =

Museum and educational institution in US

The Hip Hop Hall of Fame, also known as the Hip Hop Hall of Fame + Museum, is a New York chartered non-profit 501 c(3) museum and educational institution whose focus is hip hop music and culture from around the world.

== History ==
The Hip Hop Hall of Fame was founded in 1992 by Hip Hop Hall of Fame Awards creator and executive producer James 'JT' Thompson, a New York City native and Los Angeles-raised hip hop connoisseur. The Hip Hop Hall of Fame was launched globally in September 1995 at Sylvia's, which unveiled the plans for the museum, educational programs, and the BET Cable Network deal for the inaugural Hip Hop Hall of Fame Awards TV Show.

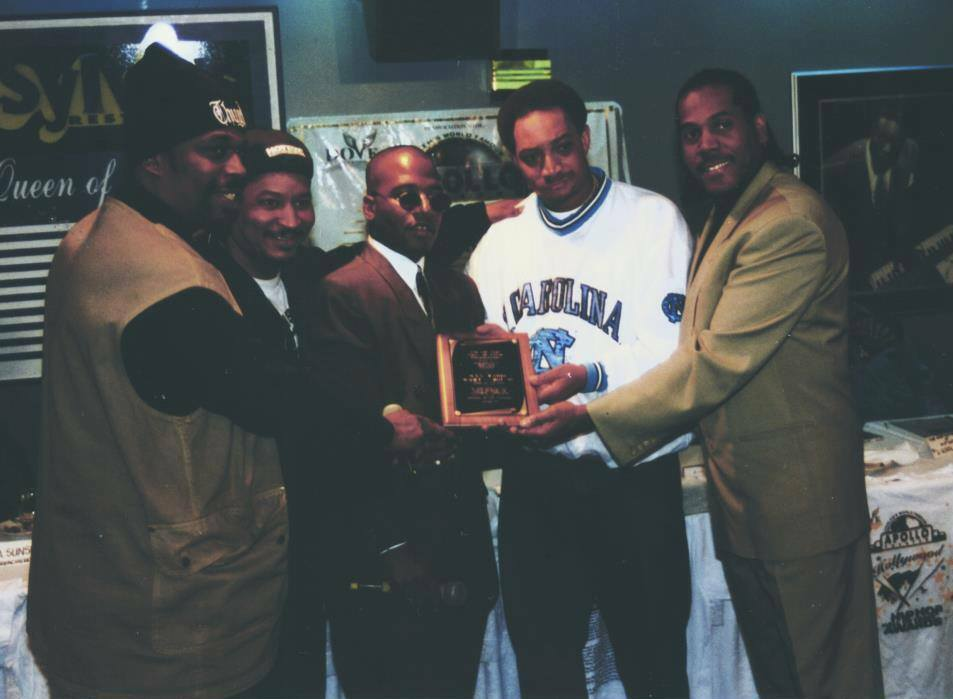
Hip Hop Hall of Fame Awards Launch in 1995 at Sylvia's in Harlem, NYC Announcing The Hip Hop Hall of Fame Museum! (L to R) Grandmaster Caz, Mr. Magic, Founder James 'JT' Thompson, Kool DJ Red Alert, and Easy AD of the Cold Crush Brothers.

The Hip Hop Hall of Fame Museum was to be funded by the Hip Hop Hall of Fame Awards TV Shows, modeled after the Rock n Roll Hall of Fame model. However, due to the artist beefs that led to the deaths of Tupac Shakur and the Notorious BIG after the show broadcasts, the Hip Hop Hall of Fame + Museum lost advertisers and sponsorship clients and could not return to the airwaves during that era, putting the museum building plans on hiatus. The Hip Hop Hall of Fame also attempted a re-launch in Los Angeles in 1997 that featured Kurtis Blow, Prince Whipper Whip of the Fantastic Five, Grandmaster Caz of the Cold Crush Brothers, founder and executive producer James 'JT' Thompson, The Watts Prophets, The Legendary Actor – Rapper 'Dolemite', Dominique DiPrima of The Beat & KJLH Radio, and more film and television personalities, but the awards still could not return to television until 2014.

=== Inductions ===
The Hip Hop Hall of Fame has held inductions in the 1990s on BET, and in 2014 from Stage 48 hosted by hip hop icon Roxanne Shante in NYC broadcast on Soul of the South TV network. The Hip Hop Hall of Fame holds its annual induction ceremony every November during Hip Hop History Month in New York City. Artists and culture element contributors are eligible for induction after 20 years from their initial record release, and contributors based upon merit and impact on hip hop music and culture that includes MCs, DJs, graffiti artworks, B-Boys/Girls dancers, executives, producers, labels, fashion, business, scholarship, and community.

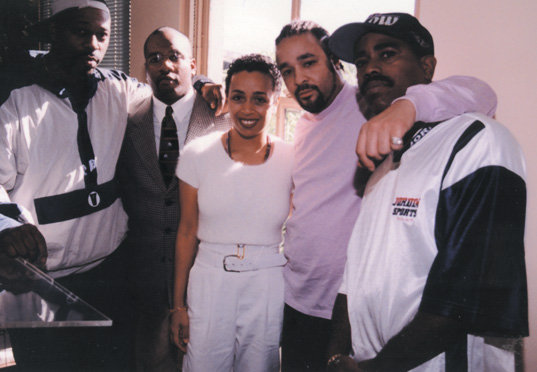
Hip Hop Hall of Fame Awards Re-Launch and Hip Hop Hall of Fame Museum 'Legends & Icons' Community Awards in 1998 at Hollywood Roosevelt Hotel in Los Angeles, Ca. (L to R) Grandmaster Caz, Founder James 'JT' Thompson, Radio Personality Dominique DiPrima, Prince Whipper Whip of the Fantastic 5, and Kurtis Blow.

== Museum ==
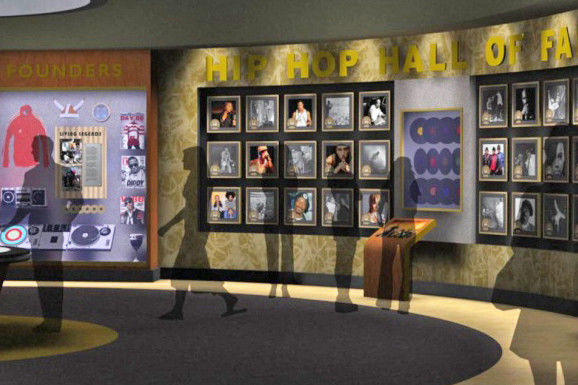
The Hip Hop Hall of Fame Exhibit Rendering

The Hall of Fame offices are currently headquartered in Harlem, New York City however no physical Hall of Fame exists as of 2023. Its community space is scheduled to feature hip hop art, music, digital video, dance, and community event space for its educational outreach with its partner organizations.

The new development project to house the Hip Hop Hall of Fame + Museum and a hotel entertainment complex was originally slated for 125th street in a 20-story facility that would include the actual Hall of Fame, a gift store, arcade, TV broadcast studios, a sports bar, restaurant and concert venue producing over 100 events annually. The Hip Hop Hall of Fame educational programming will include a youth arts and media training academy and will accommodate over 25,000 NYC public school kids on educational field trips and programs annually. The complex was scheduled for phase one in 2018 but that did not occur.

Future plans are unclear as to whether the museum, if it opens, will be in midtown or Harlem.

The Official Hip Hop Hall of Fame Museum & Hotel Mega-Entertainment Complex Night Rendering

== See also ==
- List of music museums
