= Rebecca Blasband =

Singer, songwriter

- Born: July 8, 1967 (age 59); New Hope, Pennsylvania, U.S.
- Occupations: Singer, songwriter, reality television personality

Rebecca Blasband (born July 8, 1967) is an American television personality and singer-songwriter, known as a cast member on The Real World: New York, the first season of MTV's reality television show The Real World.

== Early life and education ==
Rebecca Blasband was born and raised in New Hope, Pennsylvania, to a psychiatrist father and a German immigrant mother who runs an antique store in Philadelphia, to which her family moved to when Blasband was 13. She attended Tisch School of the Arts at New York University and worked as an actress with playwright David Mamet's theater company. Returning to music, she formed a band with Adam Schlesinger, the leader of Ivy, saying of the group's sound, "It was sort of Manchester-pop stuff. But after a while I started getting into Bob Dylan and things like that, and my direction kind of changed."

== Career ==
=== The Real World ===
In 1992, Blasband, then 24, was cast in The Real World: New York, the first season of MTV's long-running reality television series, The Real World, for which she was paid $2,500. She learned about the show from an acquaintance who was a casting director for it.

She was later cast in the 2021 reunion series, The Real World Homecoming: New York, in which the original cast were reunited in the same New York loft they originally lived in. After watching a clip from the original series in which Blasband and castmate Kevin Powell got into a heated debate about racism, the two again discussed the topic. Blasband reacted badly to criticisms from other castmates about her views on the topic, and walked off of the show in episode three.

=== Musician ===
Warner/Chappell Music signed Blasband to a publishing contract and financed an album entitled The Rebecca Blasband. This album went unreleased. She moved to Denver, Colorado in March 1995, and has opened for Edwyn Collins.

In 1997 she released the album Rapt on the Mercury label. Despite moderately positive critical reviews the album made no impact. In 2018 she self-released the album Here, which received little mainstream attention.
