= Erin Aubry Kaplan =

American journalist

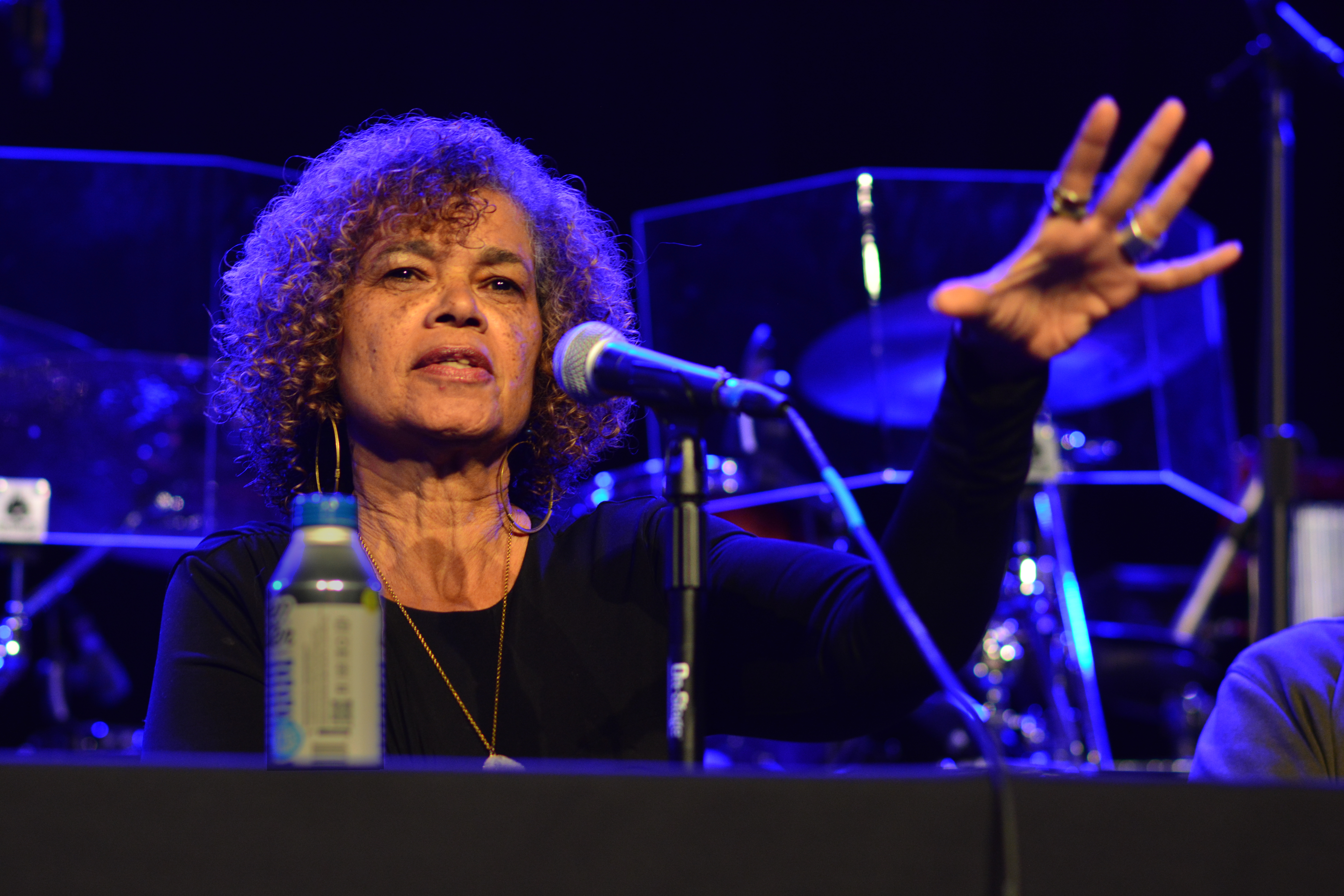
- Erin Aubry Kaplan, 2025
- Born: January 6, 1962 (age 64); Los Angeles, California, U.S.
- Education: University of California, Los Angeles (MFA)
- Occupation: Journalist
- Spouse(s): Alan Kaplan (b. 8/9/1955, d. 8/29/2015)

Erin Aubry Kaplan (born January 6, 1962) is a Los Angeles journalist and columnist who has written about black political, economic and cultural issues since 1992. She is a contributing writer to the op-ed section of the Los Angeles Times, and from 2005 to 2007 was a weekly op-ed columnist – the first black weekly op-ed columnist in the paper's recent history. She has been a staff writer and columnist for the LA Weekly and a regular contributor for many publications, including Salon.com, Essence, and Ms. Kaplan is also a regular columnist for make/shift, a quarterly feminist magazine that launched in 2007 and a contributing opinion writer for The New York Times.

Kaplan's essays have been anthologized in several books, including (as Erin Aubry) "Mothers Who Think: Tales of Real-Life Parenthood" (Villard, Washington Square Press), "Step Into A World" (Wiley & Sons) and "Rise Up Singing: Black Women Writers on Motherhood" (Doubleday). The last book's contributors include Maya Angelou, Gwendolyn Brooks and Alice Walker, and won an American Book Award in 2005. She won the PEN USA 2001 award for journalism.

Kaplan has published two books. Her first book was a collection of essays and reportage titled Black Talk, Blue Thoughts and Walking the Color Line: Dispaches From a Black Journalista, and was published in 2011. Her second, I Heart Obama, an extended essay about the cultural and personal meaning of the first black American president, was published in 2016.

Kaplan was born and raised in Los Angeles, though her family is originally from New Orleans. She married Alan Kaplan, a Los Angeles high school history teacher. He died in 2015. Kaplan holds an MFA from University of California, Los Angeles, and teaches creative writing at Antioch University Los Angeles.
