= The Real World: New York =

First season of The Real World

Coordinates: 40°43′27″N 73°59′52″W

- Season 1
- The cast of The Real World: New York
- Starring: Norman Korpi; Julie Gentry; Rebecca Blasband; Kevin Powell; Andre Comeau; Heather Gardner; Eric Nies
- No. of episodes: 13

Release
- Original network: MTV
- Original release: May 21 – August 13, 1992

Season chronology
- Next → The Real World: Los Angeles

The Real World (retrospectively referred to as The Real World: New York, to distinguish it from subsequent installments of the series) is the first season of MTV's reality television series The Real World, which focuses on a group of diverse strangers living together for several months as cameras follow their lives and interpersonal relationships. It was created by producers Mary-Ellis Bunim and Jonathan Murray.

The cast consisted of seven people, ranging in age from 19 to 26, most of whom were already living in New York City when the series taped. The cast was filmed living in a SoHo loft from February 16 to May 18, 1992, and the series premiered May 21 that year. The series consisted of 13 episodes. This is the first of three seasons to be filmed in New York City. In 2001, the show returned to the city in its tenth season, and again in 2008 for its 21st season, set in the borough of Brooklyn. In 2021, the original cast reunited for The Real World Homecoming: New York.

As the first season of one of the first series in what is now considered the reality television genre, The Real World: New York is sometimes credited with pioneering some of the conventions of the genre, including bringing together a group of participants who had not previously met, and the use of "confessional" interviews with participants to double as the show's narration (though in the first season, the confessional interviews were sparse and were not taped in a separate, private room, as would become common later). Some, however, have credited an earlier series, the 1991 Dutch TV show Nummer 28, for these innovations.

== Production history ==
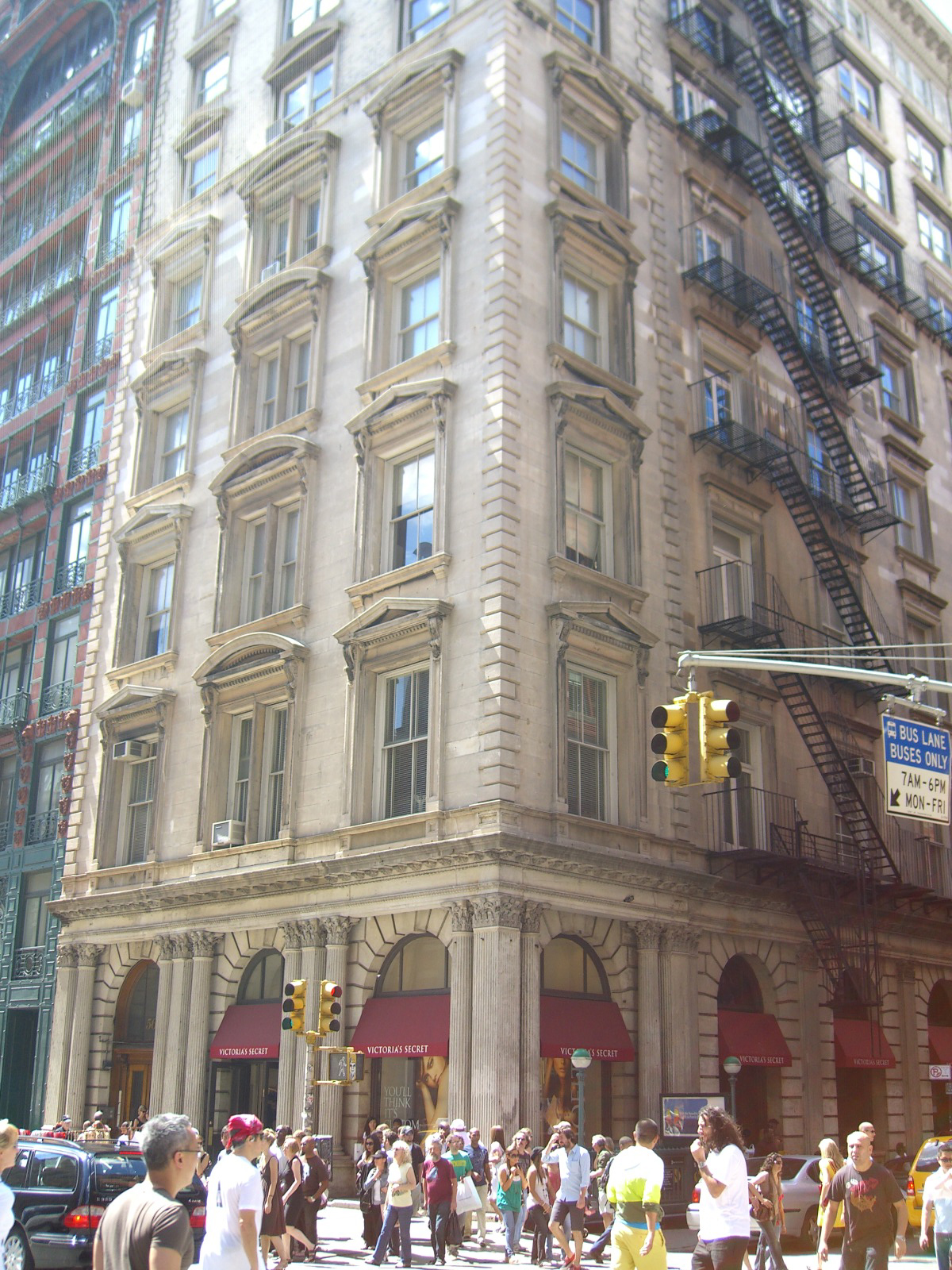
Co-op at 565 Broadway, where the season was filmed. The loft built for filming was on the second and third floors.

The Real World was originally inspired by the popularity of youth-oriented shows of the 1990s like Beverly Hills, 90210. Bunim and Murray initially considered developing a scripted series in a similar vein, but quickly decided that the cost of paying writers, actors, costume designers, and make-up artists was too high. Bunim and Murray decided against this idea, and at the last minute, pulled the concept (and the cast) before it became the first season of the show. Tracy Grandstaff, one of the original seven picked for what has come to be known as "Season 0", went on to minor fame as the voice of the animated Beavis and Butt-Head character Daria Morgendorffer, who eventually got her own spinoff, Daria. Dutch TV producer Erik Latour claims that the ideas for The Real World were directly derived from his television show Nummer 28, which aired in 1991 on Dutch television. Bunim/Murray decided upon the cheaper idea of casting a bunch of "regular people" to live in an apartment and taping their day-to-day lives, believing seven diverse people would have enough of a basis upon which to interact without scripts. The production cast seven cast members from 500 applicants, paying them $2,600 for their time on the show.

The production discovered a nine-story, ten-unit residential co-op building at 565 Broadway, at the corner of Prince Street, in Manhattan's SoHo district, after much searching, and converted the massive, 4000-square-foot duplex to be the residence and filming location. Walls separating two adjacent apartments on the second and third floors were removed in order to form a single 4,000-square-foot (370 m^{2}), four bedroom residence, and were renovated for the filming of the series. Production personnel, which included up to 13 people at one time, utilized a work space with a separate entrance. The cast lived in the loft from February 16 to May 18, 1992. The series premiered three days later, on May 21, 1992.

== Critical reception ==
At the time of its initial airing, reviews of the show were mostly negative. Matt Roush, writing in USA Today, characterized the show as "painfully bogus", and a cynical and exploitative new low in television, commenting, "Watching The Real World, which fails as documentary (too phony) and as entertainment (too dull), it's hard to tell who's using who more." The Washington Post's Tom Shales commented, "Ah to be young, cute, and stupid, and to have too much free time...Such is the lot facing the wayward wastrels of The Real World, something new in excruciating torture from the busy minds at MTV." Shales also remarked upon the cast members’ creative career choices, saying, "You might want to think about getting a real job."

Nonetheless, the series was a hit with viewers, and the initial seasons have come to be reassessed. Writing in 2011, Meredith Blake of The A.V. Club found the cast to be "ambitious, articulate, and thoughtful". Though she conceded that nearly all of the cast were pursuing careers as performers, and thus had ulterior motives for appearing on the show, she found their motivations "relatively noble" compared to that of later participants in reality TV shows, many of whom wanted simply to become famous by appearing on TV. She wrote that later seasons of The Real World had become "too much to bear" after "cast members figured out that the best way to get screen time was to act out - not to sit around having freshman dorm-room-style conversations about race relations." She wrote that, by contrast to more recent examples of reality TV, "The Real World: New York now seems incredibly, achingly earnest, bracingly raw, and sweetly idealistic."

== Cast ==
Cast Member	Age (Note: Age at the time of filming.)	Hometown
Rebecca "Becky" Blasband	24	New Hope, Pennsylvania
Becky is the daughter of a psychiatrist father and a German immigrant mother who runs an antique store in Philadelphia, to which her family moved when she was 13. She attended NYU Film School, and worked as an actress with playwright David Mamet's theater company, but eventually returned to her first love, music, and has been working as a folk singer. She now finds herself at a crossroads, as she knows she wants to do many things in her life but is unsure about which direction to take. Described by MTV as "moody" (a label affirmed by Kevin and Becky herself), she is searching for a mature relationship, and in Episode 8, begins seeing Bill Richmond, one of the show's directors.
Andre Comeau	23	Detroit, Michigan
Andre is a singer and guitarist in an indie rock band called Reigndance, with whom he has played with for three years, and with whom he moved to New York exactly one year prior to moving into the Real World loft in the season premiere. He says he grew up with music, as his mother, who had an album with Capitol Records, came from a musical family, a cross, Andre says, between The Manhattan Transfer and The Osmonds. Described by MTV as "the prototypical Gen-X guy," he and Reigndance make a video. He divides his time between Detroit and New Jersey. He rooms with Heather because both of them stay up late.
Heather B. Gardner	20	Jersey City, New Jersey
Heather is a hip-hop artist with the group Boogie Down Productions, who is on the verge of getting her big career break. She's toured, and has been on The Arsenio Hall Show, but says that in going solo, she has to start all over again. During the season, she is seen recording her album, The System Sucks. According to MTV's biography for her: "She has a lot of drive and dedication to whatever she is doing. She makes friends quickly and always speaks her mind regardless of the consequences." When discussing racial experiences in Episode 1, she says that after going to an entirely black high school, going to college with people of different ethnicities was a new experience for her. Because she says she stays up at nights, she rooms with Andre, who sleeps well into the day. She has a cat named Smokey who is sometimes shown in conflict with Norman's dog, Gouda. In Episode 2, she is seen recording for her album The System Sucks. She considers herself authentic, and thinks that Eric, by contrast, is too concerned with his image and what people think about him. In Episode 12, she and Eric have a discussion on her belief that he is insincere and expresses little of substance, and his complaint that she is unfeeling and dismissive, eventually coming to an understanding as friends.
Julie Gentry	19	Birmingham, Alabama
Julie, a Southern girl, is an aspiring dancer, though her father wants her to study to be a computer expert, in case her dance career doesn't work out. The youngest of the cast, her time on the show represents her first time in New York. According to MTV, her "innocence, engaging personality and desire to learn about the world make her the darling of the loft." She and Eric become especially close. She has not been successful in love, claiming that she could write a book on bad dates. Julie was cast to be a "fish out of water" whose first experiences in New York City could be the lens through which the viewers would be introduced to the series.
Norman Korpi	25	Wakefield, Michigan
Norman, who is of Sicilian descent, left Michigan to find a career in painting, and, with his partner, formed a company called Gouda named after Norman's dog. As the first openly LGBT Real World cast member, his sexuality becomes the focus of attention during the season, as when he has to deal with the issues that arise after he develops a serious relationship. MTV describes him as a free spirit who enjoys a good conversation, a joke, a story, or an anecdote at the drop of a hat, and who adds a lot of humor and heart to the show. Norman explains his bisexuality by saying that as a Pisces, he is always looking to be open-minded about whom to love. In Episode 3, Julie finds his manner of revealing his sexuality to be genuine and uncontroversial. Heather finds Norman to be authentic, as he does not care what others think, and says that he brings out the best in people, allowing them to feel a childlike sense of freedom. He is an avid Trekkie.
Eric Nies	20	Ocean Township, New Jersey
Eric is a print and TV model who has been working in New York for a year, having just recently begun doing commercials. His father, an NBA referee, was not always there for him growing up and as a result, he had a troubled youth. He is on probation after being arrested approximately a year and a half ago for possession of steroids. He considers himself a very sensitive person, and dislikes people who take advantage of him. He is close to his sister, Kim, and his mother. Understanding the importance of having strong role models, he volunteers to work with children in Episode 5. He is described by MTV as a "charismatic" man whose good looks easily get him attention from women. He rooms with Kevin, with whom he discusses their different views on race in Episode 5. In Episode 12, Heather and Eric have a discussion about her belief that he is insincere and expresses little of substance, as well as his complaint that she is unfeeling and dismissive. They eventually come to an understanding as friends.
Kevin Powell	26	Jersey City, New Jersey
Kevin, the oldest member of the cast, is a poet, writer and educator. He says that his father, who never married his mother, "disowned" him when he was about eight or nine years old. As a result of lacking a strong male role model, Kevin got into a lot of trouble as a teenager, which is why he now mentors a young man named Morris to help him fight negative influences from the streets. This allows Kevin to see that he shares common ground with Eric. He is now studying political science, having abandoned his initial thoughts of law school and moving to New York in 1990 to pursue writing. His publications include news articles and music reviews. He has a girlfriend named Kaseemi. Kevin has strong beliefs regarding issues of race, leading to heated arguments with his housemates. Kevin says that the racist treatment he has suffered by the police, and the atrocities endured by various peoples throughout American history, inform his anger, bitterness, and dismissal of the idea of the American melting pot. He concedes that he had his own prejudices when moving into the loft, some of which were disproven and some not. He sometimes finds it difficult to connect with his housemates, and after they play a prank on him, he leaves the loft, claiming after the prank's revelation that he had considered moving out. He rooms with Eric, with whom he discusses their different views on race in Episode 5. In Episode 11, he has an argument with Julie, who says he threatened her with a candlestick holder. He denies this and sees his cast members' taking her side as being influenced at least in part by race.

== Cameo appearances ==
Isiah Thomas, Dennis Rodman and Bill Laimbeer make cameo appearances in Episode 5, when castmates Eric Nies and Kevin Powell attend a New York Knicks game at Madison Square Garden. Larry Johnson appears in Episode 7 to meet castmates Heather Gardner and Julie Gentry, who attend a Hornets game at the Brendan Byrne Arena. Matt Pinfield, a radio host for 106.3 FM, has a cameo in Episode 8 when cast member Andre Comeau's band, Reigndance, appears for an interview with that station. In Episode 9, cast members attend a rally for 1992 U.S. Presidential candidate Jerry Brown, at which both Brown and Michael Moore are shown speaking.

== Episodes ==
No. overall	No. in season	Title	Original release date
1	1	"This is the True Story..."	May 21, 1992
As Julie prepares to leave Birmingham, she argues with her father. After the cast assembles at the loft, and Heather's beeper goes off, Julie jokingly asks her if she sells drugs, prompting the cast to discuss their experiences with race. The cast finds a copy of Gregory Stock's The Book of Questions: Love & Sex, prompting a discussion of those things. The cast later attends a performance by Becky. Julie goes out with Heather and Kevin, during which she is acquainted with the New York Subway system, and tells Kevin that she thinks he is bitter toward white people. Kevin believes that history gives him cause to bear anger towards whites, though he believes Julie to be open-minded for a white person, while Heather dismisses all racism as equally stupid.
2	2	"Julie and Eric...Could it be Love?"	May 28, 1992
The cast view a controversial Jōvan Musk commercial in which Eric appeared, and an episode of A Closer Look with Faith Daniels that discussed the matter, and offer their own thoughts on nudity. Heather thinks Eric cares too much about his image and what others think about him. Julie accompanies Heather to a recording for her album The System Sucks. Eric grows close to Julie, joining her at her hip-hop dance class, and later gets upset when Becky mentions arranging a blind date for Julie.
3	3	"Leather Chaps and Sequins? What is Eric Getting Himself Into?"	June 4, 1992
Andre worries his illness will hurt an upcoming basement performance, but its true roadblock is an appearance by the police, who respond to noise complaints. Julie seeks training at the Broadway Dance Center. After Eric does a steamy topless photoshoot with a beautiful British model named Taryn whom he is encouraged to kiss and caress, they date, but Eric doesn't share her taste in leather "rocker" clothing. Becky cooks a dinner party to help the cast bond. After Norman, Heather and Julie bond at a roller disco, Norman mentions his bisexuality in a way that Julie appreciates, and later invites Julie and Becky to an art opening. Andre dedicates the song "Redspot" to his housemates during a performance on Staten Island that the cast attends.
4	4	"Trouble Throughout the House"	June 11, 1992
The cast discusses their sexual experiences. Heather is unnerved by Becky's overtly sexual behavior at a Limelight party. The cast argues over household issues such as cigarette smoke, cleanliness, noise levels, the use of the phone. Kevin and Eric in particular argue about the overnight stay of Eric's sister, Kim. When Kevin writes a letter to Eric expressing his feelings that both Eric and the others read, Eric, who says Kevin was disrespectful to both him and Kim, is infuriated, as is Kevin (who did not intend the letter for others to read) by Eric's choosing not to come to him directly about the letter.
5	5	"Kevin and Eric Mend Their Relationship"	June 18, 1992
Continuing from the previous episode, Eric dismisses Kevin's attribution of their conflict to race and Kevin's more difficult life experiences, by saying that he, Eric, has been around black people his entire life, and by revealing that he is on probation after an arrest for steroid possession. During the course of their subsequent discussion, Kevin, who mentors a young man to steer clear of bad influences, comes to see that he has common ground with Eric, and the two make amends. Eric's past troubles spur him to apply to work in a volunteer program with children, and also affect his anticipation of a visit from Missy, his love since seventh grade. Eric also invites Kevin to a Knicks game, where the two meet Isiah Thomas, Dennis Rodman and Bill Laimbeer, and Kevin gains insight by watching Eric interact with his dad, an NBA referee whom Eric does not see often.
6	6	"Kevin...Come Back!"	June 25, 1992
Julie and Kevin grow close, and discuss the topic of love and sex. Julie is underwhelmed by her date with a painter. Kevin spends time with his girlfriend, Kaseemi, and talks about his relationship with his parents. Spurred by Julie's observation that they have not gotten to know one another that well, the cast resolves to spend Sunday dinners together, and prepare for the first one, which Kevin will cook for. But after a previously scheduled poetry reading that Kevin had forgotten about makes him absent, the cast responds with an April Fool's prank on him by switching personas, with Julie taking on an overly sexualized identity, Eric pretending to be gay, etc. When Kevin finally returns home, the prank is so successful in disturbing him that he leaves the loft.
7	7	"Heather Wants to Grab His Booty!"	July 2, 1992
Continuing from the previous episode, the cast is concerned over Kevin's abrupt departure, and relieved to inform him of the prank when he returns. Heather takes Julie to a Hornets game, where they meet Larry Johnson, with whom Heather is smitten. The women learn they will be sent on a group trip to Jamaica. Becky has a heated argument with Kevin over her viewpoint of American melting pot and Kevin's views of American imperialism and racism, which results in Kevin calling Becky a racist herself.
8	8	"Becky Falls into Troubled Love"	July 9, 1992
The girls head off to Jamaica, but are disappointed by the poor choice of men there, leading Becky into a relationship with Bill, one of the production's directors, who is fired as a result. Back home, Andre and Kevin bond during a night on the town. Andre's band, Reigndance, is interviewed by Matt Pinfield on 106.3 FM. Norman dates a man named Charles with whom he may be falling in love. When the women return home, Becky and Kevin make amends.
9	9	"Julie in a Homeless Shelter?"	July 16, 1992
In Central Park, Julie comes across a group of homeless people, one of whom, Darlene, she gets to know. The cast discuss their political leanings, and with the 1992 election upcoming, some attending a Jerry Brown rally at which Brown and Michael Moore speak. Julie, Andre, Heather, Norman and Norman's partner, Kim, then travel to the April 5, 1992 pro-choice rally in Washington, D.C., where Norman unexpectedly runs into Charles. Returning home, Julie spends a night with Darlene and the other people in Darlene's community. As the cast celebrates Norman's birthday, he discusses the gay bashing he suffered in high school, and how he defines his current purpose in life. Julie spends her first ever Easter away from home fulfilling her promise to see Darlene singing in her church choir, and is disturbed by Darlene's absence, and by Julie's investigation into her whereabouts.
10	10	"He's So Ugly He's Cute!"	July 23, 1992
The cast becomes attached to an ugly stray dog, eventually returning him to his owner. Julie's mother and his brother, Bill, visit New York. Julie laments not having a strong rapport with her mother, and the two discuss their relationship. By contrast, Andre is very close to his mother and family, who also visit and watch him perform.
11	11	"Julie Thinks Kevin is Psycho!"	July 30, 1992
A week and a half before they move out, the cast returns home to a tearful Julie, who says that Kevin, during a heated argument, threatened her with a candlestick holder and spit at her before storming out. Kevin denies this, saying that Julie's use of the phone jeopardized his livelihood and career prospects, but never threatened or spit at her before throwing out. The absence of the cameras during the incident turn it into a case of he said/she said, and Norman and Eric take Julie's side, explaining this in terms of a history of aggressive behavior on Kevin's part, but Kevin objects to what he sees as the knee-jerk nature of this conclusion, in which he feels race is a factor. He recounts the difficulty of being judged for his race by prospective employers in a poetry reading. He later tries to speak to Julie, and though they continue to argue, they both apologize for the way they conducted themselves and shake hands. Though Julie says she likes Kevin, she says she never wants to be alone with him ever again. At a party, a woman accuses Heather of assault, for which the police show up.
12	12	"WWF is in the House!"	August 6, 1992
Continuing from the previous episode, Heather, who says that the woman accusing of her assault hit Heather first, is questioned by police, but both women decline to press charges. Heather continues to record her music, while Andre's band makes a video with Bill Richmond, the former Real World director and beau of Becky's. Eric's complaints over Heather's cat, Smokey, lead to horseplay between the two housemates. They later exchange harsh words, with Eric saying that Heather is unfeeling and dismissive of his concerns, and Heather saying that Eric is insincere, and that for all his complaining, expresses little of substance. They eventually have a long talk, during which they make amends.
13	13	"Goodbye to the Big Apple!"	August 13, 1992
As the housemates prepare to move out, they playfully storm the production room in the loft, gaining perspective from the other side of the cameras, reflecting on how their time in the loft has changed them, and expressing their resolutions for the future.

== After filming ==
After filming the season, the cast reunited for the second-season premiere, and provided their predictions, advice and other thoughts regarding the Los Angeles cast. Heather Gardner predicted that someone would leave that cast. David Edwards eventually did so.

Warner/Chappell Music signed Rebecca Blasband to a publishing contract and financed an extended-play CD called The Rebecca Blasband. She moved to Denver, Colorado in March 1995, and has opened for Edwyn Collins and Squeeze.

Andre Comeau eventually left Reigndance and joined another band, River Rouge. In 2011 they released their third album, Not All There Anymore.

In 2002, Norman Korpi and Clint Owen wrote, produced and directed The Wedding Video, a spoof of The Real World that starred ten alumni of various seasons of The Real World that took the form of the video for Korpi's Beverly Hills wedding. Starring in the video along with himself were Julie Gentry and Heather Gardner, whose single "One Life", is featured in the film. As of 2008 Norman Korpi is an artist splitting time between California and Michigan.

Heather Gardner released her first album, Takin' Mine, in 1996. As of 2002 she was living in Jersey City, and had just released her album Eternal Affairs through SAI Records.

Julie Gentry returned to Birmingham. As of 2002, she had been married for four years, had recently become a mother, and was attending school and teaching dance class.

Eric Nies went on to host the MTV dance series The Grind, and also hosted and participated in a number of Real World/Road Rules Challenges. He also appeared in two episodes of Days of Our Lives, as well as bit parts in the films Above the Rim and The Brady Bunch Movie. He returned to reality television as a cast member in the 2009 VH1 series in Confessions of a Teen Idol.

Kevin Powell became a writer for Vibe magazine, an author, activist and a politician. His books include Who's Gonna Take the Weight? and Keepin' It Real, a collection of post-MTV reflections. Powell also lectures around the country about pop culture, politics, and social justice, and has unsuccessfully run for Congress three times in New York. In 2017, he married Jinah Parker.

At the 2008 The Real World Awards Bash, Eric Nies was nominated for the "Hottest Male" award, while Julie and Kevin were in the running for "Best Fight".

In 2021, the original cast reunited for The Real World Homecoming: New York in which the roommates moved back into the same loft in which they lived in 1992, with the exception of Nies, who participated virtually after testing positive for COVID-19. The cast members reflected on their time filming the first season, and discussed ways in which their experiences affected their lives, and those of their families. The cast also discussed ways in which the culture had changed their views on things such as race relations from their time filming the inaugural season in 1992, and how society was reflected in the modern state of reality television, of which they expressed critical views.

=== The Challenge ===
Cast member	Seasons of The Challenge
Andre Comeau	—N/a
Becky Blasband	Battle of the Seasons (2002)
Eric Nies	Road Rules: All Stars, Battle of the Sexes, Battle of the Sexes 2
Heather B. Gardner	Challenge 2000
Julie Gentry	—N/a
Kevin Powell	—N/a
Norman Korpi	Battle of the Seasons (2002), The Gauntlet

Eric Nies served as a host on Battle of the Seasons.
