= Kevin Powell =

American poet

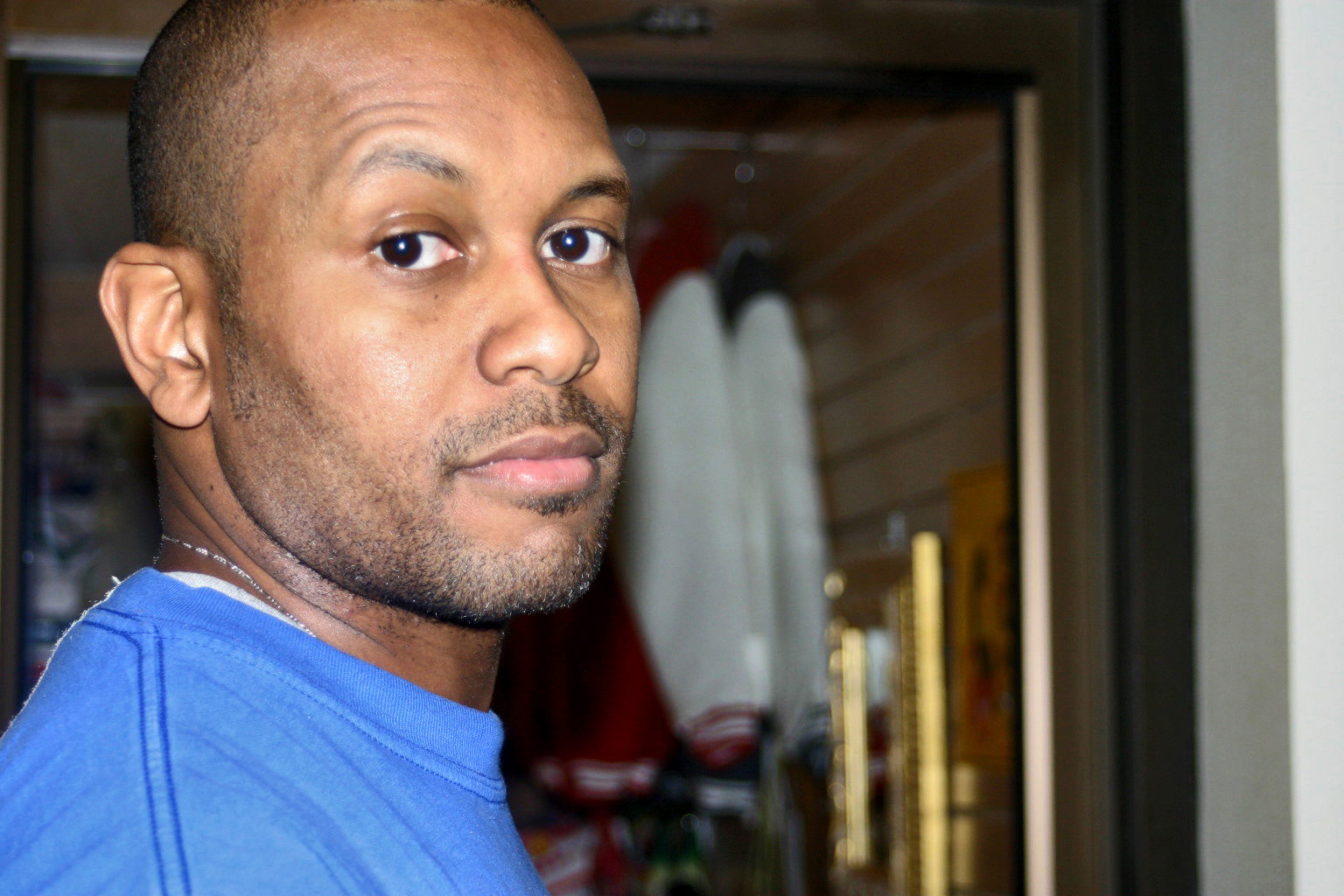
- Born: 1966 (age 59–60); Jersey City, New Jersey, United States
- Education: Rutgers University
- Occupations: Political activist, writer, reality television personality
- Spouse: Jinah Parker (m. 2017; div. 2020)

Kevin Powell (1966) is an American writer, activist, and television personality. He is the author of 14 books, including The Education of Kevin Powell: A Boy's Journey into Manhood and When We Free the World published in 2020. Powell was a senior writer during the founding years of Vibe magazine from 1992 to 1996. Powell's activism has focused on ending poverty, advocating for social justice and counteracting violence against women and girls through local, national and international initiatives. He was a Democratic candidate for the United States House of Representatives in Brooklyn, New York, in 2008 and 2010.

Powell was the curator for the first exhibit on the history of hip-hop in America at the Rock and Roll Hall of Fame in Cleveland, Ohio. In 2014, he was invited by the Welsh Government to the United Kingdom for a series of lectures and workshops on the 100th birthday of 20th-century poet Dylan Thomas. As a result, he was named the International Ambassador for the Dylan Thomas Centennial in America. Cornell University owns The Kevin Powell Archive, documenting his work to date in print, photos, videos, books, handwritten notes, speeches, and select memorabilia, beginning with his appearance in the first season of the first television reality series, MTV's, The Real World: New York in 1992.

== Early life and education ==
Powell was born in 1966 and raised in Jersey City, New Jersey, where his parents met after moving from South Carolina. Abandoned by his father, Powell was raised by a single mother from the South in the one-bedroom apartment they shared with his aunt and her son. Throughout a childhood marked by poverty, violence and abuse, Powell maintained a passion for reading and spent hours in the public library. He credits his mother with ensuring he received a better education than her own, and for instilling in him a commitment to learning. He and his cousin were the first in their family to graduate high school, and in 1984 Powell enrolled in Rutgers University through the Educational Opportunity Fund, a program created during the Civil Rights Movement to benefit poor youth. His memoir, The Education of Kevin Powell: A Boy's Journey into Manhood, tells this story of his upbringing.

At Rutgers, Powell studied political science, English and philosophy with the ambition of becoming a professional writer. Cheryl Wall introduced him to the critical study of Harlem Renaissance writers, including Richard Wright, Langston Hughes, Ralph Ellison, and black female authors such as Zora Neale Hurston. Becoming immersed in classic African-American books such as The Autobiography of Malcolm X, Manchild in the Promised Land, as well as poets from the Black Arts Movement such as Sonia Sanchez, Nikki Giovanni and Amiri Baraka, he was motivated to become an activist and student leader. He helped to organize support for the anti-apartheid movement, Jesse Jackson's 1988 presidential campaign and voter registration campaigns, and other social justice initiatives.

== Career ==
=== Early work ===
Powell began his journalism career while in college as a contributing reporter to the Black American newspaper, where he covered stories such as the racially motivated killing of Michael Griffith in Howard Beach, Queens. In 1992, Powell was an original cast member of The Real World: New York, the first season of the MTV reality television series in which a group of strangers live together for several months. During his stay in The Real World house, Powell sparked controversial discussions with his housemates, raising incendiary issues about racial stereotypes. In episode 11 of The Real World, the MTV production crew followed Powell to the Nuyorican Poet's Café, where he was a regular participant in the open mic Poetry Slam competition, created by the café's founder, Miguel Algarin. Powell had been presenting his poetry there since 1990 when he first attended an open mic to read a poem called "For Aunt Cathy". The episode is credited with bringing a national spotlight to the venue and popularizing the concept of a competitive poetry slam. MTV's producers cast Powell as the host of Straight from the Hood: An MTV News Special Report. Airing in 1993, it profiled the state of affairs for young people in South Central Los Angeles following the Rodney King verdict and riots.

=== Writing ===
While The Real World was still in production, Powell was tapped to join VIBE magazine, launched under the leadership of Quincy Jones. From 1992 to 1996, Powell worked as part of the magazine's editorial team. His cover story on the group Naughty-By-Nature appeared in the first issue of the publication. He wrote the magazine's first profile of Snoop Dogg and went on to report on notable figures in hip hop and black music, both in print and on television as host and producer of HBOs “VIBE Five” TV segments.

Powell wrote a series of cover stories on rapper Tupac Shakur. Of his relationship with Shakur, Powell explained: "He said to me in that first interview that he wanted me to be Alex Haley as in Alex Haley of Roots to his Malcolm X because I think he knew from the very beginning 'I have a very short window to live." Powell's first VIBE cover story on Shakur was the 1994, "Is Tupac Crazy or Just Misunderstood?" Powell's 1995 cover story on Shakur, "Ready to Live", – featuring an interview conducted while Shakur was jailed in Rikers Island – became one of the magazine's bestsellers. His third and last before the rapper's murder was the 1996, “Live From Death Row", a cover with Shakur, Suge Knight, Snoop Dogg and Dr. Dre in a shoot inspired by the movie poster for Goodfellas. In 2016, to commemorate the 20th anniversary of Shakur's death, VIBE published "Prayer, Passion, Purpose", Powell's previously unreleased interview following Shakur's release from Rikers Island in 1996.

Powell wrote for Esquire, Newsweek, The Washington Post, Essence, Rolling Stone, New York Amsterdam News, Ebony, TIME, CNN.com, ESPN.com, BBC, The Washington Post, The New York Times, and Huffington Post. Powell's articles evolved to draw connections between contemporary pop culture, and the heritage of black artists and writers, such as the Ebony magazine piece "Black Music's Bosses, Legends and Game Changers". He wrote the 2006 story of comedian Dave Chappelle's return to the public spotlight, in Esquire magazine: "Heaven Hell Dave Chappelle: The Agonizing Return of the Funniest Man in America".

Powell has also written reflections on his own history, such as "Letter to my Father", "Me and Muhammed Ali", published in ESPN's The Undefeated blog, and "The Sexist in Me", a piece that marked the beginning of his work around redefining black manhood and advocating for women and girls. Highlights of his articles and essays include: "Between Russell Simmons and The World and Oprah", examining the allegations of rape and sexual abuse against Simmons; his 2020 profile of Georgia politician Stacey Abrams in The Washington Post Magazine; The New York Times piece "A Letter from a Father to a Child", a message to his future child about surviving a world filled with fear, violence, sexism and racism; and The New York Times article "In Close Quarters, a Mother of 6 Battles Coronavirus", a look at the plight of an urban family facing the COVID-19 pandemic in the Bronx.

Since 1992, Powell has written 14 books. His first, In the Tradition: An Anthology of Young Black Writers, was co-edited with Ras Baraka and proclaimed "a new black consciousness movement", in response to the Black Power and Black Arts movements of the 1970s and 1980s. More than 50 writers contributed to the book, including Elizabeth Alexander, Gordon Chambers, Tony Medina, and Willie Perdomo. Powell's second book, recognize, was his first complete volume of poetry, published in 1995. In 1997, he followed with Keepin' it Real: Post MTV Reflections on Race, Sex and Politics, his first solo full-length volume, a collection of essays.

Powell's 2000 anthology, Step into A World: A Global Anthology of the New Black Literature, is a collection of work by more than 100 writers. Entries included pieces from Malcolm Gladwell, Daphne Brooks, Erin Aubrey, Scott Poulson-Bryant, Junot Diaz, Christopher John Farley, John Keene, Victor D. La Valle, Phyllis Alesia Perry, and Bernardine Evaristo.

In 2002, Powell returned as editor for Who Shot Ya?: Three Decades of Hip Hop Photography. It was the first major pictorial history of hip-hop culture, featuring more than 200 photographs by Ernie Paniccioli. A series of essay and poetry collections followed: Who's Gonna Take The Weight? Manhood, Race, and Power in America, also published in 2002; Someday We'll All Be Free in 2006; and No Sleep Till Brooklyn, New and Selected Poems in 2008. His 2008 The Black Male Handbook: A Blueprint for Life, edited with contributions from Lasana Omar Hotep, Jeff Johnson, Byron Hurt, Dr. William Jelani Cobb, Ryan Mack, Kendrick B. Nathaniel, and Dr. Andre L. Brown and a foreword by Hill Harper, tackled issues related to political, practical, cultural, and spiritual matters, and ending violence against women and girls.

In 2009, following the presidency of George W. Bush, Powell looked at America in the age of Barack Obama and questioned the long-term viability of a truly progressive, multicultural political coalition in his book of essays called, Open Letters to America. His next volume, Barack Obama, Ronald Reagan, and the Ghost of Dr. King, addressed the news headlines and the concerns of the times from the killing of Trayvon Martin to the Occupy Wall Street protests, the Penn State sex scandal.

Powell released a memoir, titled The Education of Kevin Powell: A Boy's Journey into Manhood, in 2015. According to Kirkus Reviews, "The author's story is powerful and unsparing. By the end, his narrative bears witness not only to the life of one black man, but to an American society still bound to a tragic history of racism. Raw-edged honesty at its most revealing and intense."

In 2018, he published My Mother, Barack Obama, Donald Trump and The Last Stand of the Angry White Man, in which he examines the major issues of the times, challenging society's complacency over the concerns that plague Black America, and turning an unflinching lens upon himself. In doing so, The Washington Post says: "He poignantly sketches his journey from a violent past that included physically assaulting his girlfriend and being placed under a restraining order, through reading feminist writers, speaking, writing, talking with circles of men and many hours of therapy to emerge as an introspective ‘man,' in the very best definition of that noun - even as he acknowledges that he is still a work in progress."

In 2020, Powell released When We Free the World, as an Apple Books e-book citing the desire to get away from "horrific" and "unfair" publishing industry contracts that had prevented him from earning any royalties on his prior books.

Powell curated a collection of essays, blogs, poetry, and journal entries that comprise the anthology, 2020: The Year that Changed America, published as an e-book in January, 2021. The book is dedicated to the memory of Miguel Algarín, the main founder of the Nuyorican Poets Café, to the victims and survivors of COVID-19, and to essential workers. Proceeds are being donated to the youth writing program, Urban World NYC.

In 2022, Powell published a poetry anthology entitled Grocery Shopping with My Mother. He appeared on National Public Radio's Weekend Edition in December of that year to discuss the book and his family history which inspired the title poem.

Powell's album version of Grocery Shopping with My Mother was nominated for a 2024 GRAMMY Award for Best Spoken Word Poetry Album.

=== Social activism ===
African-American social networking tool BlackPlanet featured Powell as "Riser of the Month" in February 2011 for his support of the African-American community.

=== Political aspiration ===
In 2006, Powell launched his first bid to unseat Edolphus Towns in New York's 10th congressional district, located in Brooklyn, discontinuing his campaign in July of that year. In 2008, Powell ran for Congress again, in a campaign that was backed by Chris Rock and what ABC News described as "big names from Brooklyn's 10th district". During the campaign, Towns made frequent reference to Powell's self-professed early history of violence against women. These references were addressed by Powell in an open letter to Ed Towns, where he also appealed to Towns to focus on issues. In a June 2008 interview with Theodore Hamm in The Brooklyn Rail, Powell addressed media coverage focusing on his past: "My issue of violence against women happened between 1987–1991, which is now seventeen years ago. I've written about it very prominently [...] I think if you're going to be a public servant, regardless if you're an elected official ... you have a responsibility to be transparent and accountable for everything you do."

Powell lost this race 67%–32%, receiving 11,046 votes compared to 22,586 for Edolphus Towns. Powell announced that he would run again in 2010. He lost again in 2010, and later ruled out running in 2012.

== Publications ==
- In the Tradition: An Anthology of Young Black Writers, Edited by Powell and Ras Baraka (1993) (ISBN 0-86316-316-5)
- recognize Poetry by Kevin Powell (1995) (ISBN 0-86316-324-6)
- Keepin' It Real: Post-MTV Reflections On Race, Sex, and Politics Essays by Kevin Powell (1997) (ISBN 0-345-40400-9)
- Step into a World: A Global Anthology of The New Black Literature Edited by Kevin Powell (2000) (ISBN 0-471-38060-1)
- Who Shot Ya? Three Decades of Hiphop Photography Photographs by Ernie Ernie Paniccioli, Edited by Kevin Powell (2002) (ISBN 0-06-621168-9)
- Who's Gonna Take The Weight? Manhood, Race, and Power in America Essays by Kevin Powell (2002) (ISBN 0-609-81044-8)
- Someday We'll All Be Free Essays by Kevin Powell (2006) (ISBN 1-933368-57-8)
- No Sleep Till Brooklyn, New and Selected Poems Poetry by Kevin Powell (2008) (ISBN 978-0-9796636-9-7)
- The Black Male Handbook: A Blueprint for Life edited by Kevin Powell (2008) (ISBN 978-1416592242)
- Open Letters to America: Essays by Kevin Powell (2009) (ISBN 978-1593762148)
- Barack Obama, Ronald Reagan, and the Ghost of Dr. King by Kevin Powell (2012) (ISBN 978-1105414091)
- The Education of Kevin Powell: A Boy's Journey into Manhood by Kevin Powell (2015) (ISBN 978-1439163689)
- My Mother, Barack Obama, Donald Trump and The Last Stand of the Angry White Man by Kevin Powell (2018) (ISBN 978-1982105259)
- When We Free the World by Kevin Powell (2020) (ISBN 978-1940939339)
- 2020: The Year That Changed America, Edited by Kevin Powell's Writing Workshop (2021) (AISN B08VCXK2HV)
- Grocery Shopping with My Mother by Kevin Powell (2022) (ISBN 9781593767433)
