= Deafening =

Deafening may refer to:

- An action causing deafness
- Deafening (novel), a 2003 novel by Frances Itani
- "Deafening", a song from the 2010 Disciple album Horseshoes & Handgrenades
- "Deafening", a song from the 2010 Far album At Night We Live
- "Deafening", a song by Pat Boone from the 1968 album Look Ahead
- "Deafening", a song by From Monument to Masses from the 2005 album Schools of Thought Contend
- "Deafening", a song by Bruce Bouillet from the 2013 album The Order of Control
