= The Pauses =

American indie rock band

- Origin: Orlando, Florida
- Genres: Indie rock
- Years active: 2009–present
- Labels: New Granada Records, Arctic Rodeo Recordings
- Members: Tierney Tough; Jason Kupfer; Nathan Chase
- Website: thepauses.com

The Pauses is an indie rock band from Orlando, Florida, formed in 2009 consisting of Tierney Tough, Jason Kupfer, and Nathan Chase. Their sound has been called indierocktronica due to its merging of genres. The band also playfully refers to their sound as "beep boop rock".

== History ==
The Pauses released their first album, A Cautionary Tale , in 2011 through New Granada Records.

The band funded the album via a Kickstarter campaign and recorded it with producer J. Robbins of Jawbox fame in Baltimore, MD, at The Magpie Cage. "Go North", the first planned single from that album, was added to the Rock Band Network.

In 2012, the band released a split EP with the Great Deceivers, that was engineered by Jim Nefferdorf at Major/Minor Studios, mixed by J. Robbins, and mastered by TJ Lipple (Aloha).

They released "Christmas Time Is Here" as a single in 2013, produced and mixed by bandmember Jason Kupfer at Deeb Studios.

Their second full-length album, Unbuilding, was released in 2018 on Arctic Rodeo Recordings. Crowdfunding was done via a well-crafted puppet video on Indiegogo to help fund the production costs. Produced and mixed again by J. Robbins, who, along with the album's cellist Gordon Withers, joined the band for their album release party at Orlando’s Park Ave. CDs. The album also features guest vocals by Janet Morgan (Channels), and trumpet by Patrick Newbery (Cursive).

Said BrooklynVegan of the release: “…it’s got a little of the off-kilter mathy guitars of the DC/Dischord scene that birthed J Robbins, plus bouncy Mates of States-y synths, and singer Tierney Tough has a delightfully dry delivery that brings to mind Speedy Ortiz or Liz Phair.”

In 2020, they released a split 7-inch of The Breeders covers with Omaha's The Good Life for Record Store Day.

== Live shows ==
In 2019, they toured with Jawbox, opening a handful of the band's reunion shows in Chicago, D.C., Dallas, and Austin, and were handpicked by the band to open the dates. In 2018, they were Jonah Matranga's backing band and opener for the 20th anniversary of Far's 'Water & Solutions' tour across the US. They have also toured extensively with Five Eight (band), and have been direct support for a ton of eclectic bands including Weezer, Metric, Silversun Pickups, Poppy, Ted Leo, Pylon Reenactment Society, Cursive, Angel Olsen, Sparta, and The Zombies.

The band also does annual throwback shows to the 1990s, starting with a 1994 tribute show in 2014.

Some of their live shows feature "Interact-O-Vision”, a keyboard system they invented to allow the audience to control the visuals projected onto the stage. The Knoxville News Sentinel said of the setup: “An audience-guided keyboard system projecting various clips in adjustable speeds as determined by different keys and dials, Interact-o-vision entices showgoers to choose their own adventure and shape their own concert experience.”

== Discography ==
A Cautionary Tale

- Released: March 8, 2011
- Label: New Granada Records
- Producer: J. Robbins

The Pauses / Great Deceivers 12-inch split

- Released: September 11, 2012
- Format: LP
- Label: New Granada Records

Unbuilding

- Released: June 22, 2018
- Label: Arctic Rodeo Recordings
- Producer: J. Robbins

The Pauses on Audiotree Live

- Released: August 14, 2018
- Format: Digital
- Label: Audiotree

Quarantunes EP (A collection of cover songs recorded individually at our respective homes during quarantine in March–April 2020.)

- Released: May 1, 2020
- Format: Digital
- Label: Self-released
- Writers: Harvey Danger, Dinosaur Jr., Fiona Apple

Breeders Covers Split w/ The Good Life (Record Store Day 2020)

- Released: September 26, 2020
- Format: 7"
- Label: Landland Colportage
- Writer: The Breeders
- Tracks: "Off You"
