= One Act Play (band) =

Post-rock band

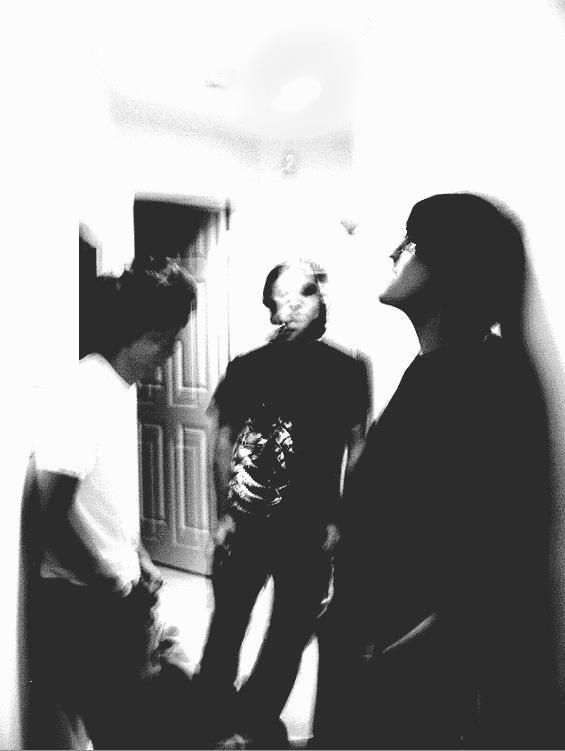

Background information
- Origin: Dallas, Texas, United States
- Genres: Post-rock, instrumental rock, indie rock
- Years active: 2003–2010
- Members: Christopher Sanchez; Matthew Vasquez; Roberto Aranda

One Act Play is an instrumental rock, post-rock band from Dallas, Texas. Heavily influenced by and often compared to bands such as Mogwai, Explosions In The Sky, and The Cancer Conspiracy, One Act Play has been known for their impassioned and diverse sound, from simple profound elements of post rock to off-the-wall psychedelic/progressive patterns.

== Biography ==
One Act Play was established in August 2003 by Chris Sanchez and Bob Aranda. After being introduced to each other through mutual friends, the band was formed after one practice session while both were still in high school. The band became complete when Bob's younger brother, Chito, received a low-budget beginner drum set for his 12th birthday. It was this first lineup that saw One Act Play began playing any shows possible throughout Dallas, usually making them an “oddball” band as they were commonly booked alongside hardcore, metal, and pop-rock bands. Nevertheless, the band's unique and refreshing sound, along with their ambitious attitudes, contributed to their local following and buildup. In June 2005, One Act Play released the "One Act Play EP", their first studio recording. In August 2005, Chito dismissed himself from the band, which left Chris and Bob to search for a replacement. Ironically with assistance from Chito, they found their new drummer, Matthew Vasquez, in March 2006. Over the course of the next two years, the band sporadically gigged while further developing their sound into something that was their own. In May 2008, the band commenced recording sessions for what was to be their first full-length. Having already written new music and recorded demos since Matthew's induction, the band found themselves at a new peak, creating anticipation amongst older fans, buzz within new fans, and landing them more gigs than ever before including some alongside From Monument to Masses and They Mostly Come Out At Night. In July 2009, the band's productivity began to decline as personal circumstances changed for some of the members and creative differences started to be presented within the internal functions of the band. Though they may have already been on hiatus, it wasn't until January 2010 that some sort of announcement was made referencing their inactive status.

== Members ==
- Christopher Sanchez (2003–2010) (electric guitar, acoustic guitar)
- Roberto Aranda (2003–2010) (bass guitar, electric guitar)
- Matthew Vasquez (2006–2010) (drums, percussion, keys)
- Ignacio Aranda (2003–2005) (drums)

== Releases ==
=== Demos & EPs ===
- One Act Play (2004 Demo) (2004)
- Incognito Blue (2004)
- One Act Play EP (2005)
- One Act Play (2007 Demo) (2007)
- Whatever Dreams May Come/Dead Can Dance (2009)
