= Attention (band) =

American alt-rock band from Minneapolis

- Origin: Minneapolis, Minnesota, United States
- Genres: Alternative rock
- Years active: 2001 – present
- Spinoff of: Gratitude, The Stereo
- Members: Jeremy Tappero; Eric Fairchild; David Jarnstrom; Derek Ritchison

Attention is a rock band from Minneapolis, Minnesota. Featuring former members of The Stereo, Gloria Record, New End Original and Gratitude, Attention is singer/guitarist Jeremy Tappero, drummer David Jarnstrom, guitarist Eric Fairchild, and bassist Derek Ritchison.

The band released their first album in 2003 with the LP Say What You Mean What You Say, which was released on Suburban Home Records. Attention played live both locally and on many national tours but was put on hiatus when Jeremy and David took over the guitar and drum duties in Gratitude. After the breakup of Gratitude, Jeremy and David returned to Attention in the later part of 2005 to record a new album. Yeah.. I'm Fine was released in Japan on Bad News Records. The band's involvement with Bad News Records gained them several live shows in Japan in December 2005. In 2007, Attention released a teaser EP titled Stand Strong featuring all new material. The Stand Strong EP was recorded is Los Angeles by producer Chris Testa (Jimmy Eat World, Dixie Chicks, Switchfoot) and mixed in Minneapolis by Grammy winner James Harley. After a 2008 UK tour Attention headed back into the studio to begin work on their next full-length album. Everything Takes Forever was released in June 2009. In January 2010, Attention returned to the studio to record a follow-up to Everything Takes Forever. It was recorded, mixed, and mastered over the course of 31 days. Through the Wire was released February 1, 2010. In the spring of 2012, they entered the studio to record Tattered Youth, which was released on May 22, 2012.

== Discography ==
- Attention (2001
- Say What You Mean What You Say (2003)
- Yeah...I'm Fine (2005)
- Stand Strong (2007)
- Everything Takes Forever (2009)
- Through the Wire (2010)
- Tattered Youth (2012)
