= Nick Driver =

American singer-songwriter

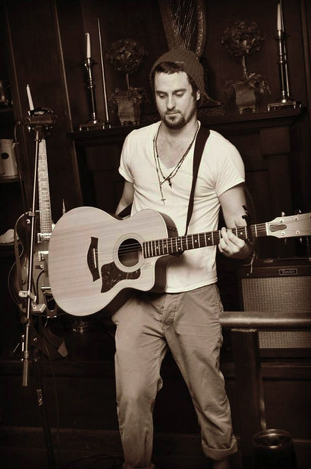

Background information
- Born: Zebulon, North Carolina, United States
- Genres: Rock, acoustic rock
- Occupation: Singer-songwriter
- Instruments: Guitar, vocals
- Years active: 2010–present
- Label: Talkback Records
- Member of: Nick Driver Band
- Website: www.nickdriver.org

Nick Driver is an American rock and Americana singer-songwriter, based in North Carolina.

In 2010, he released his debut solo album, Warm Is Your Color, which had a top-ten song hit on SiriusXM's The Coffee House radio station. Wildy's World stated about Warm Is Your Color that "Driver looks to bring the energy of punk to the finesse and precision of pop music." He has released several full-length albums and singles since, and his songs have been featured on the television shows Bad Girls Club: Atlanta, Kourtney and Kim Take Miami, The Real World: St. Thomas, and The Real World: Portland. On September 9, 2014, he released the EP Staring at My Ceiling in the Dark.

Driver tours and records as part of The Nick Driver Band, which has appeared at festivals such as FloydFest.

In 2011, he was nominated at the John Lennon International Songwriting Contest for folk, and in 2012, he was nominated for Humanitarian Songwriter of the Year at the Las Vegas Music Awards.

== Early life, education and early career ==
Driver was born in Zebulon, North Carolina, where he grew up on a farm. Driver has stated that "I wanted to play music for as long as I can remember. I guess around 1999 it hit me that [making music] is what I wanted to do. I never really turned back, and I never really had a back up plan." He started a rock band in high school, before moving to Raleigh, North Carolina, to attend North Carolina University.

While a student he studied classical vocals and guitar. He also played in a number of post-hardcore punk bands, which in both 2007 and 2009 were featured on the Vans Warped Tour.

== Music career ==
=== Warm Is Your Color (2010) ===
After playing heavy rock styles for close to a decade, Driver began writing music in a primarily acoustic style. His debut solo LP Warm Is Your Color was self-released on January 1, 2010. He toured the United States in support of the album, which had a top ten song hit on SiriusXM's The Coffeehouse, titled "Let's Stay Together."

Wildy's World gave Warm Is Your Color a positive review and 3/5 stars, calling it an "adroit turn" and stating that "turning to word-heavy light acoustic pop (ala Jason Mraz) and balladry, Driver looks to bring the energy of punk to the finesse and precision of pop music". The review praised the creativity of several songs in particular, but criticized others for not suiting Driver's style. "The more up-tempo acoustic pop songs work very well for Driver, whereas the slow ballads find Driver losing energy, focus and sound." Music Spectrum also compared Driver's style to Mraz, and stated, "Aside from the Mraz comparison, I also hear what's called Speedwood by the group Lost & Found. What they mean are some hard acoustic guitar lines—kind of a punk energy to folk music. Driver displays this on 'Young Beautiful,' with the guitar accentuated by congas."

=== Recent years ===
Driver went on to release several more solo albums after Warm Is Your Color. A Kinda Love This World Could Never Burn, his next, was released on April 12, 2011, on Talkback Records. His single off the album, "Spare Me Some Change", led to Driver being a finalist in the John Lennon Songwriting Award for Folk in 2011. Later that year, he released the EP Coffee House Hero: Live & Rare Acoustic B-Sides on Interscope Digital Distribution.

Driver self-released Poet's Corner, Vol. One on September 25, 2012. It received a positive review in Indy Week, which stated the album lacked adventure and is instead "a record of simple and openhearted tunes, and when it works, Driver offers the kind of amiable pop that Matt Nathanson would be proud to call his own, as with the endearing 'Collect the Rain'". Jonah Matranga sang backing vocals for Driver's song "Universal Love" on the album Poets' Corner Volume One in late 2012. In 2013, he independently released two albums: Folsom Prison Blues and The Nicky D LP.

Driver's songs have been featured on television shows, including Bad Girls Club: Atlanta on Oxygen Network, Kourtney and Kim Take Miami on E! Network, The Real World: St. Thomas, and The Real World: Portland.

On September 9, 2014, he released the EP Staring at My Ceiling in the Dark.

=== The Nick Driver Band ===
The Nick Driver Band
- Genres: Americana, rock
- Years active: 2010–present
- Members: Nick Driver, Darren Abbacchi, Mike Chidsey
- Past members: Jade Werth, Elijah Ott, Billy Hinnant, David Arn Jr., Jared Pyle
- Website: Nick Driver Band on Facebook

Formed to record on Driver's studio albums and perform live, early on The Nick Driver Band included Driver, Darren Abbacchi, Elijah Ott, Billy Hinnant, and Jared Pyle. Other past members include Jade Werth on guitar, keyboards, and harp. In 2012, The Nick Driver Band won "Best Rock Band in the Triangle" by The Independent Weekly in Raleigh.

The band has toured extensively throughout the United States, and opened for groups such as Edward Sharpe and the Magnetic Zeros, North Mississippi All-Stars, Pat Benatar, The Lumineers, Jonas Brothers, Demi Lovato, Less Than Jake, and Creed.

The band has performed at festivals, including the Warped Tour, The American Music Festival, Celebrate Fairfax, and Floydfest 2013.

Members as of 2014

- Nick Driver – vocals, guitars, songwriting
- Darren Abbacchi – drums
- Mike Chidsey – lead guitar

== Style ==
Driver uses few effects in his solo material, and mostly relies on acoustic instruments. While he incorporates the stylings of multiple genres, much of his music has an "Americana, singer-songwriter feel".

According to Driver, "Jamie King from Swift is a big influence on me and my music. He's the most talented producer I've ever worked [with]." Driver has also cited poets such as Sylvia Plath as influences on his lyrics, stating "She was intense. I make loads of sunshine type songs, but a lot of my influences have a tendency to be a little bit on the darker, edgier side of things." About his message, "I guess...I want to express that the simple things in life are the best. I want to make love and relationships sound like an interesting concept like they truly are."

== Personal life ==
Driver is based in Raleigh.

== Discography ==
=== Solo material ===
==== Albums ====
Full-length studio and live albums by Nick Driver
Year	Album title	Release details
2010	Warm Is Your Color	Released: January 1, 2010; Label: self-released; Format: CD, digital
2011	A Kinda Love This World Could Never Burn	Released: April 12, 2011; Label: Talkback Records; Format: CD, digital
2012	Poet's Corner, Vol. One	Released: September 25, 2012; Label: self-released; Format: CD, digital
2013	Folsom Prison Blues	Released: June 30, 2013; Label: self-released; Format: CD, digital
2013	The Nicky D LP	Released: December 31, 2013; Label: self-released; Format: CD, digital

==== EPs ====
EPs by Nick Driver
Year	Album title	Release details
2011	Coffee House Hero: Live & Rare Acoustic B-Sides	Released: September 12, 2011; Label: Interscope Digital Distribution; Format: digital
2014	Staring at My Ceiling in the Dark	Released: September 9, 2014; Label: self-released; Format: digital

==== Singles ====
Incomplete list of songs by Nick Driver
Year	Title	Album	Notes
2010	"Let's Stay Together"	Warm Is Your Color	top-ten artist on SiriusXM's The Coffee House radio station
2011	"Spare Me Some Change"	A Kinda Love This World Could Never Burn	Nominated – 2011 John Lennon International Songwriting – Folk
2011	"Fragile Hearts"	A Kinda Love This World Could Never Burn	The Real World: St. Thomas, episode "Paradise Found"
2011	"Everything Is Going to Be Just Fine"	A Kinda Love This World Could Never Burn	The Real World: St. Thomas, episode "Roommates Become Bed Mates"
2011	"Bad Bad Leroy Brown"	single only	Interscope
2012	"You Should Learn to Love Someone"	single only	self-released
2012	"Universal Love" (featuring Jonah Matranga)	Poets' Corner, Vol. One	Nominated – Humanitarian Songwriter of the Year by Las Vegas Music Awards
2012	"Collect the Rain"	Poets' Corner, Vol. One	Kourtney and Kim Take Miami, episode "Dragon Me Down"
2012	"It's a Beautiful Day"	Poets' Corner, Vol. One	Bad Girls Club, episode "Gone with the Weave" and "Anger Mismanagement"
2012	"Out Alive"	Poets' Corner, Vol. One	The Real World: Portland, episode "2808"
2012	"My Game Is Tighter than an Emo Kid's Jeans"	Poets' Corner, Vol. One	The Real World: Portland, episode "2807"

== See also ==
- List of people from North Carolina
- List of singer-songwriters
