= Gratitude (band) =

American alternative rock band

- Origin: San Francisco, California, U.S.
- Genres: Emo, alternative rock, pop punk
- Years active: 2003–2005
- Label: Atlantic Records
- Past members: Jonah Matranga; Mark Weinberg; Jeremy Tappero; Bob Lindsey; Robby Cronholm; David Jarnstrom; Thomas Becker

Gratitude was an American alternative rock band that existed from 2003 to 2005.

== History ==
Gratitude was formed in 2003 by Mark Weinberg (originally of the band Crumb) and Thomas Becker (originally of the Get Up Kids). Initially called the Collision, the band was joined by Bob Lindsey on bass and Robby Cronholm (also formerly of Crumb) on vocals. After touring in 2002 with New End Original, which featured Far alum Jonah Matranga and Jeremy Tappero, Cronholm left the band and was replaced by Matranga. When Matranga joined, the band changed their name from the Collision to Gratitude. After picking up Matranga and changing their name, Gratitude signed to Atlantic Records. The group picked up Tappero as second guitarist before going into the studio. After Becker left the band in the middle of recording the record, drummer David Jarnstrom joined the band before the release of their self-titled debut album (Becker and other session musicians fulfilled the drum role during the recording of the album).

Atlantic Records released Gratitude on March 8, 2005. The tracks "Drive Away" and "This Is the Part" were released as singles and received significant radio play both in the US and the UK. Gratitude's first tour for the album was in North America, supporting Jimmy Eat World (to whom the band has often been compared), and they were also on the bill for the 2005 Warped Tour and a leg of the 2005 Taste of Chaos.

The band faced many difficulties after their album's release — the commercial response was somewhat poor, and Weinberg left the band in June for personal reasons, thus forcing Gratitude to continue touring as a four-piece. Many show cancellations throughout the second half of 2005 and rumors of the band being dropped by Atlantic put the future of the band at stake. Eventually Gratitude released a statement on November 25, 2005, saying that they had in fact decided to split after playing one final show at the Ascot Room in Minneapolis two days earlier. Matranga stated the band ended when Weinberg quit the band and threatened to sue him if he continued using the name.

The members of Gratitude have gone on to various other projects, with frontman Jonah Matranga continuing with his solo work. Members, Jeremy Tappero and David Jarnstrom returned to their other band, Minneapolis rockers, Attention. In March 2007, bassist Robert Lindsey joined them. Mark Weinberg became a producer and writer. Former drummer Thomas Becker went to Harvard Law School and became a human rights lawyer. He currently plays in The Beautiful Bodies.

== Discography ==
=== Albums ===
- Gratitude (Atlantic Records, 2005)

=== Singles, EPs ===
- Drive Away - B-sides: CD Single "Sadie" (acoustic), 7" Pt. 1 "Drive Away" (acoustic), 7" Pt. 2 "Annelise Says"
- This Is Th EP Art - UK - Ltd. Edition 5" vinyl with B-side "If Ever" acoustic
