= Beautiful Bodies =

American alternative rock band

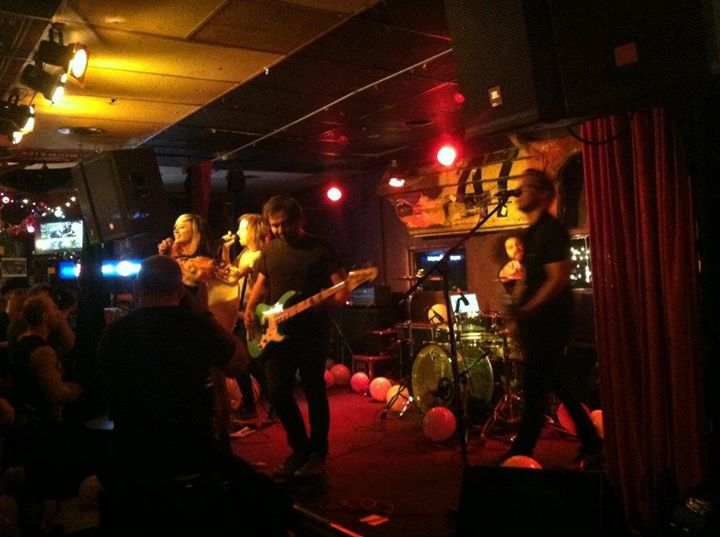
The Beautiful Bodies performing at The Brick in Kansas City, 2012

Beautiful Bodies were an American alternative rock band on Epitaph Records from Kansas City, Missouri featuring Alicia Solombrino, Thomas Becker (The Get Up Kids, Gratitude), Luis Arana, and Michael Stout.

== History ==
=== Formation ===
Beautiful Bodies developed as a band while the members resided in different countries. Becker, Harvard-educated human rights lawyer, was living in Bolivia, suing the former president for massacring protestors. Solombrino and Arana were based out of the United States, where they had previously played in bands together. Becker began demoing music with Solombrino, sending tracks back and forth via email, when one of the songs they recorded, "You're a Risk," was picked up by alternative rock station KRBZ and spread to other regional college and alternative stations, garnering label attention for the band. In response to the widespread label interest, industry magazine HITS Daily Double referred to Beautiful Bodies as "one [of] the biggest unsigned stories of the moment."

=== Epitaph signing and release of Battles ===
In 2013, Beautiful Bodies won Ernie Ball's Battle of the Bands for Warped Tour, beating out 32,000 artists in the world's largest battle of the bands. In May 2014, after talks with indie and major labels, the band signed a record deal with Epitaph Records and toured with Emarosa and Pvris later that year. They went into the studio with John Feldmann (Blink 182, The Used, 311, Five Seconds of Summer), and their debut album Battles was released on June 16, 2015. Their first single, “Capture and Release” received radio play on U.S. and European stations, including on radio giants KROQ and BBC Radio. In 2016, Kerrang! Magazine, the world's largest weekly rock magazine, nominated Beautiful Bodies for their Best New International Newcomer Award.

=== Touring ===
Known for their energetic live shows, the band toured extensively in North America and Europe, sharing the stage with alternative and punk bands, including The Smashing Pumpkins, My Chemical Romance, Jane's Addiction, and The Yeah Yeah Yeahs. The band was known to cross genres, however, playing with artists such as Dave Chappelle, Eminem, and Bebe Rexha. Beautiful Bodies were repeat artists on several festivals, including Warped Tour (U.S. and Europe) and SXSW, and the band's music has been featured in television commercials such as NFL advertisements and live events such as the World Series and New York Fashion Week.

=== Breakup and subsequent projects ===
The band announced they were to disband in 2017 via Solombrino's facebook account. Their last show was in Madrid, Spain with Mayday Parade. Solombrino has continued to make music under the name Alicia Solo, self-releasing her first EP Solo in 2017. Becker returned to law and in 2018 won the first human rights lawsuit in U.S. history against a living ex-president. He currently teaches at Harvard Law School, though he took a leave in spring 2019 to climb Mount Everest, which he successfully summited despite it being one of the mountain's deadliest years. Stout is working as a record producer. Arana continues to play music in Kansas City, including his work as the bassist in post-punk band New Obsessions.

== Band members ==
- Alicia Solombrino — vocals
- Thomas Becker — guitar, drums
- Luis Arana — bass
- Michael Stout — guitar
