= The Real World: Portland =

Coordinates: 45°31′32.4″N 122°40′47.6″W

- Season 28
- The cast of The Real World: Portland minus Daisy
- Starring: Anastasia Miller; Averey Tressler; Jessica McCain; Johnny Reilly; Joi Niemeyer; Jordan Wiseley; Marlon Williams; Nia Moore; Daisy Tressler
- No. of episodes: 12

Release
- Original network: MTV
- Original release: March 27 – June 12, 2013

Season chronology
- ← Previous; The Real World: St. Thomas Next → Real World: Ex-Plosion

The Real World: Portland is the twenty-eighth season of MTV's reality television series The Real World, which focuses on a group of diverse strangers living together for several months in a different city each season, as cameras follow their lives and interpersonal relationships. It is the seventh season of The Real World to be filmed in the Pacific States region of the United States, specifically in Oregon, and is also the second season to be filmed in the Pacific Northwest after The Real World: Seattle.

The season featured a total of eight human cast members over the course of the season, as one cast member was replaced after she voluntarily left the show, as well as a dog. Portland, Oregon was first reported as the location for the twenty-eighth season in a June 19, 2012 article on the website Byronbeck.com. MTV Head of Programming David Janollari confirmed that Portland would be the location for the twenty-eighth season on August 3, 2012, at the annual Television Critics Association Press Tour. Production started from August 2, 2012, and concluded on October 31, 2012. The season premiered on March 27, 2013, consisting of 12 episodes.

This is the last season of The Real World to use the cast narration "This is the true story...of seven strangers..." in the opening title sequence, before a new format was implemented beginning with the 29th season. It was later brought back on the 33rd season.

In 2019, the season was made available for streaming on Facebook Watch alongside The Real World: Austin and The Real World: Key West.

== Employment ==
Most seasons of The Real World since the fifth season have included the assignment of a season-long group job or task to the housemates, continued participation in which has been mandatory to remain part of the cast since the Back to New York season. However, no group assignment is given to the cast this season; the castmates are free to apply for jobs that production had pre-approved at local eateries. The cast ultimately were hired to and chose to work at a pizzeria/bar called Pizza Schmizza Pub & Grub and a yogurt shop called Cool Harry's. The cast also interviews at The Roxy, but none end up working there.

Joi expressed displeasure with the limited employment options to choose from and partly left the show due to this concern. Nia was dismissed from her work at the pizzeria, but because jobs this season were not a mandatory group assignment, she did not have to leave the show.

== Residence ==
The cast lived in a 20,000 square foot, two-story building at 338 NW 9th Avenue, at the corner of Northwest Flanders Street. Prior to being used as the season's setting, the property was on sale for $3.25 million USD. While commercial tenants occupied a portion of the first floor, the 10,000 square foot second floor loft was renovated for filming, along with an additional 7,000 square feet used by the production staff, which leased the loft for six months. The loft was designed by Rick Gonzalez. Filming ended in October 2012. That same month, the property was contracted to Raymond Management Co., a Middleton, Wisconsin-based hotel developer that planned to convert the site into a 220-room, eight-story hotel.

== Cast ==
Although previous seasons have depicted cast members keeping pets while living in the season residence, this is the first season of the show in which a non-human is listed as a cast member at MTV.com and credited in the title sequence, a Chihuahua/Jack Russell mix named Daisy. The Real World's sister show, Road Rules, included a dog as part of the cast of its X-Treme season. Cast members on prior Real World seasons have had pets in the house that were not credited as part of the cast.

Cast member	Age^{1}	Hometown
Anastasia Miller	22	Redford, Michigan
While she is described as having been "awkward and dorky" in high school, today the 5' 11" Anastasia, who describes herself as a "girly girl", and is characterized by Jordan in the premiere as a "Barbie doll", is a model who does promotional work and a singer. She was raised by her mother and grandmother, with whom she lives, while her alcoholic father, who spent time in and out of jail, was not a strong presence or influence in her life. In fact, she tells Jordan in Episode 7 that she did not get along with him because his behavior was so reminiscent of her father. Her nickname is "Bird", on account of both her sense of wanderlust and her height, which is evocative of the Sesame Street character Big Bird. She has a boyfriend that she has been dating since early 2012. MTV describes her as a nerd who loves The Lord of the Rings and Harry Potter. She graduated in 2008 from Redford High School in Detroit, and is majoring in journalism, with the hopes of obtaining a job where "her voice will be heard". MTV observes that while she may appear to be "light and goofy", she can also be quick to show anger when offended, and proves to be a good friend to her castmates. She becomes good friends with Averey.
Averey Tressler	21	Tempe, Arizona
Averey is originally from Tecumseh, Michigan, and is of Mexican, Native American and European heritage. She is proud of her job at Hooters, which allows her to live independently, though she dislikes when others focus on her looks, as she prefers to emphasize her other qualities, and rarely wears makeup or jewelry. Her alcoholic father was not a presence or influence in her life, a point of commonality with which she bonds with Anastasia in the premiere, and she harbors a strained relationship with her mother, whose abusive relationships led Averey to move in with a friend's family at age 15. She continues to have a relationship with her younger sister Jenna, however, whom she says she tried to defend from her mother's abuse when they were younger. She played volleyball and basketball at Britton High School, from which she graduated in 2009. As soon as she was able to, Averey moved to Arizona, where she was involved in a tempestuous relationship, and although she is no longer in it, the ordeal made it difficult for her to trust men, despite the fact that she considers herself "extremely sexual", open to trying new things, and is characterized by MTV as "insatiable". She brought her dog, Daisy, to live with her in Portland, and upon arriving there, develops a mutual attraction to Johnny, and the two become a couple. She also becomes close friends with Anastasia.
Daisy	1	Tempe, Arizona
Daisy is Averey's pet dog. Adopted at 5 months from a dog shelter, Daisy is a Chihuahua and Jack Russell mix breed. Cleaning up after her in the house becomes a source of conflict among the other roommates.
Jessica McCain	21	Fayetteville, North Carolina
Jessica sees herself as the "black sheep" of her conservative, half Hispanic, half Irish family due to her outgoing nature. She considers herself sensitive on account of having been picked on by her two brothers and sister. She also says that she has no friends back home, the only person she is close to is her mother, which is why she wants to be accepted in Portland. When she was 16, she and her then 26-year-old fiancée became engaged, but the relationship eventually ended. She and her boyfriend, James, broke up three weeks before she came to Portland because she says she was putting more into the relationship than he was, which makes it difficult for her when she begins dating a man in Portland named Tyler. Jessica says she tends to choose men who are unable to meet her needs, but she is still looking for the right man. According to MTV she is "feisty", and exhibits a "wide-eyed innocence" and a sense of "wacky levity", and her roommates sometimes perceive her to be akin to an "attention-seeking, annoying little sister". She was part of the Zeta Tau Alpha sorority at the University of North Carolina at Pembroke. Like Anastasia, she is also a model, and says she wanted to be a Playboy Playmate. She lives with her mother and stepfather, and came to Portland in order to explore who she is outside her sheltered life. Despite her apparently feminine sensibilities, describes herself as an adventurous tomboy who enjoys activities such as fishing, hunting, riding her several dirtbikes in motocross events and skydiving. She comes into conflict with Jordan early in the season, and later, with Averey, Anastasia and Johnny, for which Nia comes to her defense.
Johnny Reilly	21	West Bridgewater, Massachusetts
Johnny is the middle child of a boisterous blue-collar Irish family, and grew up in a small town "with more cows than people." He was a star hockey player at Coyle and Cassidy High School in Taunton, Massachusetts, where he graduated in 2009. When he realized he would not be able to make a career out it, he decided to refocus his studies in order to become a physical therapist or trainer. He has had to take a semester off due to financial expenses, and works as a short order cook at a local bar. MTV characterizes him as "the glue that holds his friends together", and says that he has always been the center of attention, and beloved by his friends for his charm and honesty. He enjoys partying, but gets into trouble when drunk. His social history is marked by a combination of both one-night stands and instances of falling in love, though his last committed relationship was two years ago, and he tends to suppress his emotions until they manifest in the form of jealousy. When arriving in Portland, he and Averey develop a mutual attraction, and become a couple.
Joi Niemeyer	22	Seattle, Washington
Joi, who has a Korean mother and a white military father, believes that many men who are not accustomed to tall Asian women are intimidated by her 5' 9" height. At Kingston High School, however, from which she graduated in 2008, her height helped her succeed in basketball, volleyball, and softball. She has diamond nipple piercings and tattoos, including a large one of an angel on her left side, which MTV says reflects her "edgy interior". At 19, she posed nude for Playboy, which caused a rift with her conservative parents that lasted for some time, and although she has mended her relationship with her parents, and formed a newly honest relationship with her father, she continues to be demure from sharing details of her sex life with her mother, and isn't certain if she still wants to become a Playboy Playmate. In 2012, she graduated from the University of Washington, where she majored in communications. Joi dates all types of men, but prefers black athletes. Disappointed by the job prospects in Portland, and after a talk with her father, she decides to return home in Episode 3. At the reunion special, however, Joi reveals that her boyfriend's recuperation from surgery back home was her main reason for leaving the house.
Jordan Wiseley	22	Mustang, Oklahoma
Jordan has participated in a number of different sports and activities, including motocross since age nine, and playing as captain of his football team at Mustang High School, from which he graduated in 2008. He has also won four different national championships in cheerleading, an activity he began on a dare. He is a 2008 graduate of Mustang High School, and attended Oklahoma State University, where he majored in business, and was the president of his wakeboarding club, an activity he began four years ago, and in which he is now a semi-professional. He was born without fingers on his left hand, but has never perceived it as a handicap, nor a hindrance to his physical activities, including socializing with women, and refuses to have fingers surgically constructed, because he feels that it would constitute giving up due to weakness. Jordan attributes his achievements to his father, Larry, who did not accept failure or excuses, and whose strict upbringing including corporal punishment involving hitting with his fists and a belt, but Jordan does not consider this abuse, but tough love that helped Jordan develop a thick skin during conflicts. Jordan's friend Blake, however, characterizes Larry as "the asshole who made [Jordan] who he is", and believes that Jordan strives to prove himself different from his father, despite Blake's observation that Jordan is exactly like his father. Jordan can be combative with those he disagrees with, which leads him to come into conflict with nearly the rest of the cast, in particular Jessica and Anastasia, and after Nia moves in, with her as well. When Anastasia reaches out to him in Episode 7 when she feels he is being scapegoated for his conflicts with others, Jordan reveals that his father was so degrading at times during his childhood that he contemplated suicide. He concedes that he is "way too much" like his father, and is "a hard person to live with [and] like", but that he has been the way he is for so long that he does not know how to change. Jordan is studying marketing at the University of Central Oklahoma. According to MTV, his deep ambition masks a deep insecurity and a fear of dying without making his mark on the world, which gradually reveals itself over the course of the season.
Marlon Williams	24	Lubbock, Texas
Marlon is a military brat whose world travels as a child taught him how to adapt to new environments, but which precluded his ability to form long-term friendships with people in whom he can confide. He is an only child who was sheltered by his "super-religious" family, which includes a pastor grandfather and a pastor father, the latter of whom raised him after his parents divorced when he was six months old. Though Marlon strives to please him, his strong religious upbringing can lead him to feel conflicted where his sex life is concerned. Marlon never saw his mother until her funeral when he was in the seventh grade. He excelled at football in high school, and was a linebacker at Texas Tech University, where he majored in civil engineering. Marlon twice received honorable mention for the All-Big 12 Conference team, and wanted to become a professional player, but his professional prospects faded after he was cut by the Canadian Football League during the 2010 NFL draft, a low point that led him into a depression. It also led to his acceptance into Austin's gay community, where he experimented with his bisexuality, though he now says that sex with men "wasn't for him". The last girlfriend he had was for six months in the seventh grade, and though he says he wants a girlfriend, he is averse to the large number of women he has encountered who demand that he spend money on them. His disposition has since improved, and he is majoring in industrial engineering, though he is irritated at being judged by the people of Lubbock for no longer playing football. He hopes that Portland will provide an opportunity for a fresh start, free of others' expectations and preconceptions about him. He is also pursuing a career as a rap musician.
Nia Moore	23	Powder Springs, Georgia
Nia moves into the house in Episode 4 to replace the departed Joi. She graduated by magna cum laude from Howard University, whose urban environment overwhelmed her. She majored in print journalism and political science, and aims to be a writer, philanthropist and model, but has been fired from four out of the five jobs she has had. Despite her parents' consternation at her professional status, Nia prefers to enjoy life than to worry about getting a regular job. The middle of three daughters, she lives with her mother, who does not approve of Nia's going to Portland, and though she and her younger sister are often mistaken for identical twins, she says both of her sisters are "goody two-shoes", which is the "opposite" of her. She is a fan of alternative, rock and country music, and is an avid fan of hip-hop star J. Cole. She currently works as a cocktail waitress in Atlanta. At 18, she became a victim of date rape, but her rapist was acquitted of the crime. As a result, she is cautious in terms of being sexually aggressive, and is protective of women, a trait that manifests itself in the form of a vendetta against Jordan, whom she perceives to be transgressive with the other women in the house. Jordan, however, takes issue with Nia's lack of a work ethic, pointing to the way in which she says she acquires money and other things she needs from men, and characterizing her as a "golddigger". During the season, Nia physically assaulted multiple roommates and even conspired to have Jordan attacked by a third party. She is often ranked as one of the worst Real World cast members.

^1 Age at time of filming

=== Duration of cast ===
Cast member	Episodes											
Cast member	1	2	3	4	5	6	7	8	9	10	11	12
Anastasia	Featured	Featured	Featured	Featured	Featured	Featured	Featured	Featured	Featured	Featured	Featured	Featured
Jessica	Featured	Featured	Featured	Featured	Featured	Featured	Featured	Featured	Featured	Featured	Featured	Featured
Jordan	Featured	Featured	Featured	Featured	Featured	Featured	Featured	Featured	Featured	Featured	Featured	Featured
Marlon	Featured	Featured	Featured	Featured	Featured	Featured	Featured	Featured	Featured	Featured	Featured	Featured
Nia				Entered (Note: Nia replaced Joi in Episode 4.)	Featured	Featured	Featured	Featured	Featured	Featured	Featured	Featured
Averey	Featured	Featured	Featured	Featured	Featured	Featured	Featured	Featured	Featured	Featured	Featured	Left (Note: Averey, Johnny, and Daisy voluntarily left the house in the season finale after multiple physical altercations with Nia who continued to threaten them, but the three stayed in a hotel for the rest of the season.)
Johnny	Featured	Featured	Featured	Featured	Featured	Featured	Featured	Featured	Featured	Featured	Featured	Left
Daisy	Featured	Featured	Featured	Featured	Featured	Featured	Featured	Featured	Featured	Featured	Featured	Left
Joi	Featured	Featured	Left (Note: Joi voluntarily left the house in Episode 3 due to personal reasons.)									

== Episodes ==
No. overall	No. in season	Title	Original release date	Viewers (millions)
542	1	"Bondage, Butts and Burlesque"	March 27, 2013	0.72
The cast members assemble at the season residence and become acquainted with one another. Jessica finds herself immediately becoming friends with Joi. Jordan is attracted to Anastasia, who has a boyfriend, while Johnny and Averey develop a mutual attraction that manifests itself when the cast visits a strip club. The cast reacts to learning that Joi posed for Playboy. Anastasia reacts negatively to Marlon's comments about women's physical attributes, and when Johnny and Marlon later bring home a trio of women that they subsequently evict in a nondiplomatic manner, Anastasia and Joi are angered, leading to a heated argument between them and Jordan.
543	2	"Hot Air Jordan"	April 3, 2013	0.96
Averey downplays her kiss with Johnny in the previous episode, but their relationship continues to develop and becomes sexual. Averey and Anastasia are unmoved by Jordan's attempt to discuss the previous night's argument. Jessica tries to talk to Jordan about the matter, and relates her childhood conflict with her three siblings, but Jordan, who feels that the harsh corporal punishment with which he was raised gave him a thick skin, sees this as play for sympathy on her part, characterizing Jessica as a "drama queen", particularly in light of her reaction to receiving an email from her ex-boyfriend, James. Marlon reveals that he has had sex with a man and is bisexual. Jordan and Jessica get into a heated argument over issues of money and happiness.
544	3	"Hot and Bothered"	April 10, 2013	0.99
Jordan's drunken behavior provokes conflict with other cast members. Most of the cast gets jobs at local eateries, but Joi, who sees the low pay at the available jobs to be a demotion from her previous work, decides to return home. Jessica begins dating a man named Tyler. Averey and Johnny's sex life continues, manifesting in the form of sex in the restroom on their first day of work at a pizzeria. The cast goes wakeboarding together, and later speaks to their new roommate, Nia, on the phone.
545	4	"New Chick, Little D***"	April 17, 2013	1.15
New cast member Nia moves in to replace the departed Joi, and becomes acquainted with the cast. She becomes close to Marlon in particular, who tells her about his once having had sex with a man, while she relates a time when she says she was allegedly date raped by a man who plied her with a date rape drug and was later acquitted of the charge at trial. Nia later confronts Jordan over his disrespect toward Jessica, but Jordan is unmoved. When Nia and Jordan later have a critical exchange themselves, Nia responds by questioning Jordan's manhood, and then offers to perform a sex act on him in front of the others.
546	5	"I Wanted Romance Not No Pants"	April 24, 2013	0.89
Continuing from the previous episode, Nia demures on her offer to perform a sex act on Jordan, later telling the women that she made the offer in order to confirm that Jordan harbors an inferiority complex about his penis, which she says is small, while Jordan criticizes Nia for trying unsuccessfully to embarrass him, and failing to follow through on her offer, and the others are made uncomfortable by the incident. Jessica tells Tyler that the lingering feelings from her breakup with her previous boyfriend make it difficult for her relationship with Tyler to move forward, as does her "no boys in my bed" policy. Averey is troubled by Johnny's association with other women, in particular one back home named Bridget from whom he receives an email, and by his behavior during the cast's snowboarding trip to Mount Hood with Olympic snowboarder Danny Kass.
547	6	"How To Play The Game"	May 1, 2013	1.02
Nia gets a job at the pizzeria, but her lack of commitment to the job fuels the latest iteration of her feud with Jordan. After excelling at go-kart racing during a cast trip, Jordan explains why he does not wish to have fingers on his left hand surgically constructed. Jordan's drunken behavior continues to cause friction with the others, as does Nia's flirtation with Jordan during these instances, which she does for purposes of manipulation, and which eventually leads to a physical altercation.
548	7	"The A-Nia-lation Proclamation"	May 8, 2013	0.90
The cast reacts to Jordan and Nia's fight from the previous episode, with Marlon angered by Jordan's racially provocative behavior, Jessica disturbed by Jordan's physical aggression with a woman, Anastasia concerned that Jordan is being made a scapegoat, and Johnny's anger at all concerned, which affects a cast trip to Bridal Veil Falls. When Jordan's friends, Blake, Tyler and Taylor visit, Anastasia perceives Taylor to harbor romantic feelings for Jordan, while Nia seeks Taylor's counsel on how to coexist with Jordan. Johnny's drunken behavior irritates Averey.
549	8	"Pantsfall"	May 15, 2013	0.91
Nia has a mishap with a kegel toning device. When she is later fired from the pizzeria for her lack of commitment to the job, she insults her boss, Brett, which draws the ire of her castmates, who criticize her for her rudeness and lack of gratitude for being given a job. Averey and Anastasia are alienated by what they perceive as Jessica's dominant behavior during group activities, and distance themselves from her, leading her to feel excluded. This leads to a series of heated confrontations that draw the involvement of Nia and Johnny. This episode is sometimes listed as "Pink Wigs, Pink Slips"
550	9	"Heartbreak Hotel"	May 22, 2013	0.80
Anastasia experiences disappointment over the high expectations of her relationships with her fellow housemates. Her boyfriend, Mark, visits, but things turn sour when he gets drunk at a club one night. The two eventually reconcile, leading her to question whether to leave the house or stay, though she ultimately stays. The cast accuses Nia of over-feeding Averey's dog, Daisy. Johnny issues an apology to Jessica for derogatory remarks that he makes to her in the previous episode.
551	10	"Sins of the Flesh (eaters)"	May 29, 2013	1.08
Marlon faces a conflict with his personal faith, after he has casual sex with a woman at a club. He also meets a record producer at a studio for whom he displays his rapping talent. Jessica looks forward to her seeing her boyfriend Tyler, but he breaks up her via email. Johnny becomes jealous after he sees Averey conversing with another man at a bar. They later work things out at a zombie-hunting mission.
552	11	"Welcome to the Sh*t Show!"	June 5, 2013	1.01
After breaking up with Tyler, Jessica vows to remain celibate until marriage and buys a purity ring. Anastasia confronts Jessica over her perception that Jessica seeks attention. The two eventually reconcile. The cast (excepting Nia and Jessica) go fishing at the Columbia River Gorge. Nia and Johnny get in a verbal argument over who should have to clean Daisy's excrement, which also draws in Anastasia, and later leads to a physical altercation between Nia, Johnny and Averey.
553	12	"Out With a Bang!"	June 12, 2013	1.05
After the brawl comes to a conclusion, the cast calls a meeting to decide if Nia should stay in the house for the remaining three days. Nia is ultimately allowed to stay. Johnny, Averey, and Daisy check into a hotel for the remainder of their stay but remain part of the show. Nia, angry about what she perceived as Jordan's involvement in the fight, arranges for her friend Dom to beat up Jordan, but Dom has a change of heart after talking to Marlon. Marlon performs his new songs at a club. Nia and Jordan reconcile. The roommates leave Portland and reflect on their experience.

== After filming ==
The Real World: Portland Reunion aired on June 12, 2013, following the season finale. It was hosted by The Real World: Back to New York alumna Coral Smith, and featured the entire cast, as they discussed their time during filming and their lives since the show ended.

Since filming ended, Jessica returned to North Carolina, where she enjoys ballroom dancing and plans to manage a nutrition shop, while Anastasia returned to Detroit, where she enjoys the music scene, plans to finish her bachelor's degree in broadcast journalism and is working on recording her album. Jordan returned to Oklahoma, where he mainly works for his father's construction company and enjoys the outdoors, while Nia returned to Atlanta, where she intends on finishing her book, and is working on a fitness product called "The Booty Belt" with her business partner, Dominic Banks. Marlon returned to Lubbock, Texas, where he hopes to start a clothing line, record an album and return to a fitness regimen. Averey initially returned to Arizona for two months prior to moving to Boston with Johnny, along with her dog Daisy. Averey stated that she regretted leaving her job as a Hooters waitress, but found a new occupation as a bartender in the Boston area, while also pursuing modeling as a hobby. Johnny returned to his restaurant job, while he also plays on a local hockey team and hopes to become a fitness trainer and a firefighter. Anastasia, Jessica, Jordan and Marlon each participated in The Challenge: Rivals II in Thailand after filming ended.

Among the topics discussed were the aftermath of the fight involving Nia, Johnny and Averey, with each roommate stating their own opinions as to whether or not Nia should have remained in the house, as well as the conflicts between Jordan and Nia, which resulted in a heated argument between Jordan and Anastasia, though Jordan and Nia made amends. Jessica's relationship with Tyler and Jordan's aggressive behavior were also discussed, and Anastasia revealed that she had a hidden crush on Jordan, despite having a boyfriend back home. Marlon and Anastasia discussed their personal struggles on the show, including Anastasia's struggle with her boyfriend's drug addiction as well as Marlon's insecurity over his Christianity and sexuality. Joi appeared during the reunion, and stated that her boyfriend's recuperation from surgery, more than her disappointment over her job prospects, was her main reason for leaving the show in the third episode. Joi now works at a bank, and despite not living in the house at the same time as Nia, the two have become close friends.

In 2013, on Rivals II, Marlon hooked up with cast member Derek Chavez from The Real World: Cancun and came out as bisexual to the camera in an interview. In the same year, he released his first album under the name Jay Dillinger titled Real World: True Story, that also featured Jessica, Nia and Anastasia. In 2019, he was cast on the fourth season of Ex on the Beach.

Since filming for Battle of the Exes II ended, Jordan has pursued a career in acting and had a recurring role on the OWN Network original series, Tyler Perry's If Loving You Is Wrong. In 2018, Jordan also appeared on MTV's Fear Factor alongside his then-girlfriend, Tori Deal from Are You the One?, whom he met on season 30 of The Challenge. Together they released two songs: "Work Song" and "Home". In 2019, the couple got engaged while filming season 34 of The Challenge. They ended their engagement in late 2020.

On June 18, 2020, Jordan and Nia reunited on Instagram Live to talk about their racial dispute in light of the Black Lives Matter movement, after MTV cut ties with fellow Total Madness cast member Dee Nguyen for controversial comments on the matter.

Johnny and Averey broke up in December 2013, after filming for the 25th season of The Challenge had completed. Reilly married Kimberly Lawlor on September 11, 2020. In 2025, Averey got engaged to Road Rules: The Quest cast member Adam Larson, whom she met on the fourth season of The Challenge: All Stars.

Jessica married baseball player Jonathan France on February 6, 2021.

On February 25, 2026, Averey Tressler confirmed that Daisy passed away on February 23.

=== The Challenge ===
Cast member	Seasons of The Challenge	Other appearances
Anastasia Miller	Rivals II	—N/a
Averey Tressler	Battle of the Exes II, Rivals III, Battle of the Eras	The Challenge: All Stars (season 4)
Jessica McCain	Rivals II, Free Agents, Battle of the Exes II, Rivals III	—N/a
Johnny Reilly	Free Agents, Battle of the Exes II, Rivals III	—N/a
Joi Niemeyer	—N/a	—N/a
Jordan Wiseley	Rivals II, Free Agents, Battle of the Exes II, XXX: Dirty 30, War of the Worlds 2, Total Madness, Ride or Dies, Battle of the Eras	The Challenge: Champs vs. Pros, The Challenge: All Stars (season 3), The Challenge: World Championship
Marlon Williams	Rivals II	—N/a
Nia Moore	Free Agents, Battle of the Exes II, Battle of the Eras, Vets & New Threats	The Challenge: All Stars (season 3), The Challenge: World Championship

Note: Jordan also appeared on Vendettas and Battle for a New Champion for an elimination
