= On Little Known Frequencies =

Studio album by From Monument to Masses
- Released: March 10, 2009
- Genres: Post rock, Alternative rock
- Length: 51:56
- Label: Dim Mak Records

From Monument to Masses chronology
Schools of Thought Contend (2005)	On Little Known Frequencies (2009)

On Little Known Frequencies is the fourth and final studio album by the post-rock band From Monument to Masses. Released on March 10, 2009, this album is the first album of new music released by From Monument to Masses since 2003, making it the band's fourth release on Dim Mak Records. As with other albums released by the group, sung lyrics do not play a part in the album, with numerous television, radio and film sound clips played within tracks.

== Track listing ==
1. "Checksum" - 6:26
2. "(Millions Of) Individual Factories" - 5:43
3. "Beyond God & Elvis" - 4:45
  - Contains quotations from the film Fast Food Nation
4. "A Sixth Trumpet" - 5:36
5. "An Ounce Of Prevention" - 9:20
  - Contains quotation from Mario Savio on the operation of the machine
6. "The First Five" - 3:02
7. "Let Them Know It's Christmastime" - 8:52
8. "Hammer & Nails" - 8:12

== Personnel ==
According to the album liner notes, the contributors were as follows:

- Francis Choung - Group Member
- Matthew Solberg - Group Member
- Sergio Robledo-Maderazo - Group Member, Design, Photography, Illustrations, Vocal Engineer, Photo Manipulation
- Matt Bayles - Production, Engineering, Mixing
- Ed Brooks - Mastering
- Princess Bustos - Vocals
- Joshua F. Castro - Vocals
- Carla Bayani Cienfuegos - Liner Notes
- Laura Dean - Assistant
- DJ Patrick - Turntables
- Drew Fischer - String Engineer
- Keith Freund - Editing
- Robin Landy - Guitar
- Ceceilia Madariaga - Cello
- Elizabeth Montgomery - Viola
- Liezel Rivera - Vocals
- Ota Yoshiharu - Photography
- Theo Zimmerman - Cello
