= Gratitude (Gratitude album) =

Studio album by Gratitude
- Released: March 8, 2005
- Recorded: April – June 2004
- Studio: Cello Studios; Hollywood, California
- Genre: Emo
- Length: 43:17
- Label: Atlantic
- Producer: Jim Scott

Gratitude chronology
Gratitude (2005)	This Is Th EP Art (2005)

Professional ratings
Review scores
Source	Rating
Allmusic	4/5 stars
AbsolutePunk	(70%)
Drowned in Sound	6/10 stars
Punk News	2.5/5 stars

Gratitude is Gratitude's first and only album. It was released on March 8, 2005, on Atlantic Records.

== Recording ==
Vocalist Jonah Matranga commented on the recording:

"[Producer Jim Scott] was friends with everyone, and the studio was buzzing all the time. Wendy from The Revolution stopped by. Mick Jagger walked through the vocal booth. Jimmy Eat World was recording there, Liz Phair was doing a guest vocal with them, Jon Brion was walking around the hallways. We were looking for a new drummer while we were recording, and Dave Krusen came in to try out."

The album features several guest drummers.

== Track listing ==
No.	Title	Writer(s)	Length
1.	"Drive Away"	Matranga, Weinberg	3:19
2.	"Last"	Matranga, Weinberg	3:23
3.	"All in a Row"	O'Brien	2:53
4.	"The Greatest Wonder"	O'Brien	4:11
5.	"This Is the Part"	Matranga, Weinberg	2:54
6.	"Feel Alright"	O'Brien	3:55
7.	"Sadie"	Matranga, Weinberg	3:46
8.	"Someone to Love"	O'Brien	4:36
9.	"Another Division Street"	Matranga, Weinberg	3:44
10.	"If Ever"	Matranga, Weinberg	3:39
11.	"Dream, Again"	O'Brien	3:09
12.	"Begin Again"	Matranga, Weinberg	3:48
13.	"Until When? (Always Waiting)" (UK Exclusive Track)	Tappero	4:16

== Personnel ==
- Bobby Lindsey - bass guitar
- Dave Jarnstrom - drums
- Jonah Matranga - vocals, acoustic guitar
- Jeremy Tappero - guitar
- Mark Weinberg - guitar

Additional musicians

- Kenny Aronoff - drums (2, 6, 10, 11)
- Thomas Becker - drums (1, 5, 7, 9, 13)
- Matt Chamberlain - drums (3, 4, 8, 12)
- Don Heffington - percussion (except 5)
- Greg Leisz - pedal steel guitar (4, 8)
- Patrick Warren - keyboards (4, 6, 9–12)
