= Coral Smith =

American reality television personality

- Born: Coral Jeanne Smith; January 19, 1979 (age 47)
- Occupation: Reality television personality
- Children: 1
- Website: http://www.doulacoral.com/

Coral Jeanne Smith (born January 19, 1979) is an American former reality television personality, known as a cast member on MTV's The Real World: Back to New York, and for her subsequent appearances on various seasons of The Real World's spin-off show, The Challenge. Her most recent Challenge appearance was on Real World/Road Rules Challenge: The Gauntlet III, which aired in early 2008.

On April 2, 2008, Smith appeared on the first Real World Awards Bash, winning the award for "Roommate You Love To Hate." In 2013, Smith returned to television and MTV as host of The Real World: Portland on-air aftershows and the season's reunion show.

== Career ==
=== The Real World: Back to New York ===
Smith was a 21-year-old part-time student and nanny living in San Francisco when she decided on a whim to audition for MTV's long-running reality TV series, The Real World and Road Rules. She and two dozen finalists were housed together for a casting special leading up to the selection. During her stay at the casting house, Smith came into conflict with finalist Ellen Cho. Smith was ultimately selected as a cast member for the tenth season of The Real World, which would be set in New York, the first season of the show since 1992 to be set there.

During Smith's season on The Real World, which aired in 2001, she came into conflict with Mike Mizanin over views he related to Smith from his uncle, who opined that black people were slow and uneducated. Although Mizanin attempted to disown the comments as merely those of his uncle, Smith and their other housemate, Malik Cooper, who are both black, were offended. Coral and the other housemates went on to teach Mizanin about black culture, such as the life of Malcolm X.

Observing that every season of The Real World features cast members in archetypal roles, Smith asserts that she was the "bitch" of her season, though she insists that her use of this label is meant to connote her assertiveness and outspokenness, and not lack of likability.

After filming The Real World, Smith went to work at a rape crisis center.

=== Reality television appearances ===
Smith has appeared on six seasons of the spin-off series Real World/Road Rules Challenge, and has made it to the final mission on four of those Challenges. During Fresh Meat, Smith's partner, Evan Starkman, developed an abdominal hernia. Smith herself sustained a leg injury, and the producers of the show removed them from the competition. This marked Smith's first Challenge in which she did not make it to the final mission.

Much curiosity and speculation has arisen over Smith's relationship with Abram Boise from Road Rules: South Pacific during Battle of the Sexes 2. In response to a question by an MTV rep, Smith said:

I wouldn't expect Abram to invest his time or pursue a woman like myself, that's so mouthy and such a feminist I believe that I'm a strong woman and I believe that a lot of my morals and how I live my life was completely opposite than his. I really feel like he has come into a reality about meeting new people with me and I'm happy to be in his life, and I'm happy to teach him and help him, but it's not hard. We're going through this weird racial thing. He doesn't bring it up and it's not an issue with us, which makes it even more wonderful. It's just right and it's something that happened naturally. He didn't have to fight against this racist thing. I give all the credit to Abram for his changes, and for who he is now. I believe that it was his ability to learn and be open to other people's words. We both get really angry and we both are really sensitive and we both put up this front and inside, I believe Abram is one of the kindest and most gentle people I've ever met. And I think it was his ability to get in touch with his own kind, gentle side that allowed him to like me anyway, despite my big giant mouth and how bitchy I can be. And I think that we found a common ground there, and because I was open to him, I feel like he was able to open up to me. And when Abram and I opened up to each other, it was a beautiful, beautiful friendship that I've never experienced before, ever. I've never met anyone like Abram. Never, and people underestimate him all the time.

However, Smith indicated in another interview that she and Boise were not involved in a romantic relationship, and that any appearance to that effect was engineered through the use of selective editing on the part of the show's producers in order to elicit ratings.

In 2005 Smith appeared on Battle of the Network Reality Stars. In January 2007 Smith appeared on the Fox Reality reality show, Camp Reality. In January 2008, Smith appeared on The Gauntlet III. She voluntarily left towards the end of the Challenge. This marked Smith's second Challenge in which she did not make it to the final mission. At the end of that season, at The Gauntlet III Reunion Special, Smith explained that she left because she was unwilling to tolerate what she perceived as disreputable behavior by her teammates; an observation that was corroborated by teammate Katie Doyle.

On April 2, 2008, Smith appeared on the first Real World Awards Bash, winning the award for the "Roommate You Love To Hate". In 2013, Smith served as host of The Real World: Portland's on-air aftershows and the season's reunion show.

== Personal life ==
Following her Challenge appearances, Smith moved to San Francisco, where she worked as a freelance writer and the host of an internet-based travel show.

Smith was present at a gay pride event at Paramount's Great America amusement park in 2007, which prompted in interview with OUTlook magazine in which she explained that her sexual orientation was at that time "very cloudy" and she was "venturing toward my lesbian qualities. It's been a long time coming."

Smith gave birth to her daughter, Charlie Beatrice, on June 22, 2013.

== Filmography ==
=== Television and video ===
- The Real World: Portland Reunion Special (2013)
- The Real World: Portland After Show (2013)
- The Real World: Hollywood Marathon (2008)
- Real World Awards Bash (2008)
- Real World/Road Rules Challenge: The Gauntlet III (2008)
- The Challenge: Top 25 Most Intense Moments (2008)
- Camp Reality: Fox (Jan. 30, 2007)
- Well Done: Fresh Meat Reunion (September 11, 2006)
- Fresh Meat: MTV The After Show guest of Blair (2006)
- Real World/Road Rules Challenge: Fresh Meat (2006)
- Coral accepts the award MTV's First Ever Reality Awards: Bad M*F* (2006)
- Coral's (Back to New York) Casting Couch: Your First Look at the Real World Key West (2006)
- All-Star Reality Reunion: MTV (2005)
- The Reality Show:MTV (Premier:September 13, 2005)
- Battle of the Network Reality Stars: Bravo (August 2005)
- TV Spring Break: Co-host with Mike Mizanin (2005)
- Best Week Ever:VH1 (Premiered: January 23, 2004)
- Real World/Road Rules Challenge: Battle of the Sexes 2 (2004)
- Montezuma's Revenge: The Inferno Reunion (2004)
- Real World/Road Rules Challenge: The Inferno (2004)
- Battle Scars: From the Gauntlet to the Inferno (2004)
- The Real World Hook-Ups (Premiered: November 11, 2003)
- Real World/Road Rules Challenge: The Gauntlet (2003)
- E! True Hollywood Story - Episode:The Real World (2003)
- Real World/Road Rules Challenge: Battle of the Seasons (2002)
- Road Rules: Desert Dueling (Premiered: Monday October 15, 2001)
- The Real World: Back to New York (2001)
- Real World and Road Rules 10th season casting special (June 26, 2001)
- The Real World - Decade of Bloopers (2006)
- Reality TV Secrets: How To Get On The Show! (May 1, 2003)
- Real World: Hook-Ups Coral hosts with Dan Renzi (2003)
- The Real World You Never Saw: Back to New York (December 4, 2001)

=== Film ===
- The Wedding Video (2003)

=== Radio and podcast ===
- KNGY Energy 92.7FM San Francisco Morning show DJ. Fernando and Greg in the Morning (November 2005-March 2006)
- Fishbowl Host (Wednesday November 3, 2004)

=== Print ===
- King (2006)
- King "Who you callin' a ..." (2006)
- GQ w/ Mike Mizanin and Melissa Howard (June 22, 2005)
- Sexiest Women of Reality TV Calendar (2005)
- MTV's Real World NY 24/7 by Alison Pollet (Author) Publisher: MTV (October 30, 2001)
- TV Guide (Fall 2001)
- Time Out New York (Fall 2001)
- Fitness (January 2000)
- Fitness (February 2000)
- Fitness (March 2000)
- Fitness (April 2000)
