= Water & Solutions =

Studio album by Far
- Released: March 10, 1998
- Recorded: April 1997
- Studios: Magic Shop, New York City
- Genres: Post-hardcore; emo; alternative rock; alternative metal
- Length: 41:10
- Labels: Epic; Immortal
- Producer: Dave Sardy

Far chronology
Tin Cans with Strings to You (1996)	Water & Solutions (1998)	At Night We Live (2010)

Singles from Water & Solutions
- 1. "Mother Mary" Released: 1998

Professional ratings
Review scores
Source	Rating
AllMusic	4/5 stars
Pitchfork	5.8/10
PunkNews	4.5/5 stars

Water & Solutions is the fourth album by American rock band Far. It was released on March 10, 1998 through Epic / Immortal.

== Background ==
The album was recorded in April 1997, nearly a full year before being released in March 1998. During the 11 month interval, the band released the promotional Soon EP in October 1997, which contained two songs from the upcoming album, as well as a cover of the Jawbox song "Savory", and an acoustic version of the 1996 track "Sorrow's End". That year, the band also released a 7" vinyl split with Immortal Records label mates Incubus, and performed several songs from the still unreleased Water & Solutions on tour.

== Release and reception ==
Stephen Thomas Erlewine of Allmusic gave Water & Solutions a positive four star review, stating it "finds the Sacramento-based alternative metal band coming into their own, creating a distinctive fusion of the sober, grinding guitars of Helmet and Tool" and that "the best moments of Water & Solutions show that Far have carved out their own alterna-metal niche." French publication Rocksound claimed in 1998 that the album's sound was "made up of the best elements of Deftones and Radiohead." In 1999, CMJ New Music Report referred to it as a "sonically flawless masterpiece."

More contemporary reviews have cited Water & Solutions as a progenitor to the 2000s emo rock movement, with PopMatters remarking in 2004 the record was "a few minutes before everything emo blew the hell up; the album and the band that made it disintegrated quickly after its release."

In 2018, Jonah Matranga went on a tour in honor of the album's 20th anniversary. The Pauses served as the opening act and Matranga's backing band.

== Track listing ==
All lyrics are written by Jonah Matranga; all music is composed by Far.

No.	Title	Length
1.	"Bury White"	3:09
2.	"Really Here"	2:44
3.	"Water & Solutions"	3:09
4.	"Mother Mary"	2:16
5.	"I Like It"	3:21
6.	"The System"	2:05
7.	"Nestle"	3:22
8.	"In 2 Again"	5:03
9.	"Wear It So Well"	3:30
10.	"Man Overboard"	4:57
11.	"Another Way Out"	2:59
12.	"Waiting for Sunday"	4:31

== Personnel ==
Far

- Jonah Matranga – vocals, guitar
- Shaun Lopez – guitar
- John Gutenberger – bass
- Chris Robyn – drums

Production

- Dave Sardy – production
- Greg Gordon – engineering
- Stephen Marcussen – mastering
- Don C. Tyler – digital editing
