= The Real World: Back to New York =

Coordinates: 40°44′18″N 74°00′19″W

- Season 10
- The cast of The Real World: Back to New York
- Starring: Coral Smith; Kevin Dunn; Nicole Mitsch; Rachel Braband; Mike Mizanin; Lori Trespicio; Malik Cooper
- No. of episodes: 22

Release
- Original network: MTV
- Original release: July 3 – December 4, 2001

Season chronology
- ← Previous; The Real World: New Orleans Next → The Real World: Chicago

The Real World: Back to New York is the tenth season of MTV's reality television series The Real World, which focuses on a group of diverse strangers living together for several months in a different city each season, as cameras follow their lives and interpersonal relationships. It is the second season of The Real World to be filmed in the Mid-Atlantic States region of the United States, specifically in New York after The Real World: New York.

The season featured seven people who lived in a four-floor loft at 632 Hudson Street in the Greenwich Village neighborhood of New York City. As its title indicates, Back to New York is the first season to take place in a city that had hosted a previous season, as the show's first season was set in New York in 1992.

The Back to New York season was filmed January 9 to June 2, 2001. It premiered July 3 of that year and consisted of 22 episodes.

The cast appeared in a cover feature in the Fall 2001 issue of Time Out New York.

== The residence ==
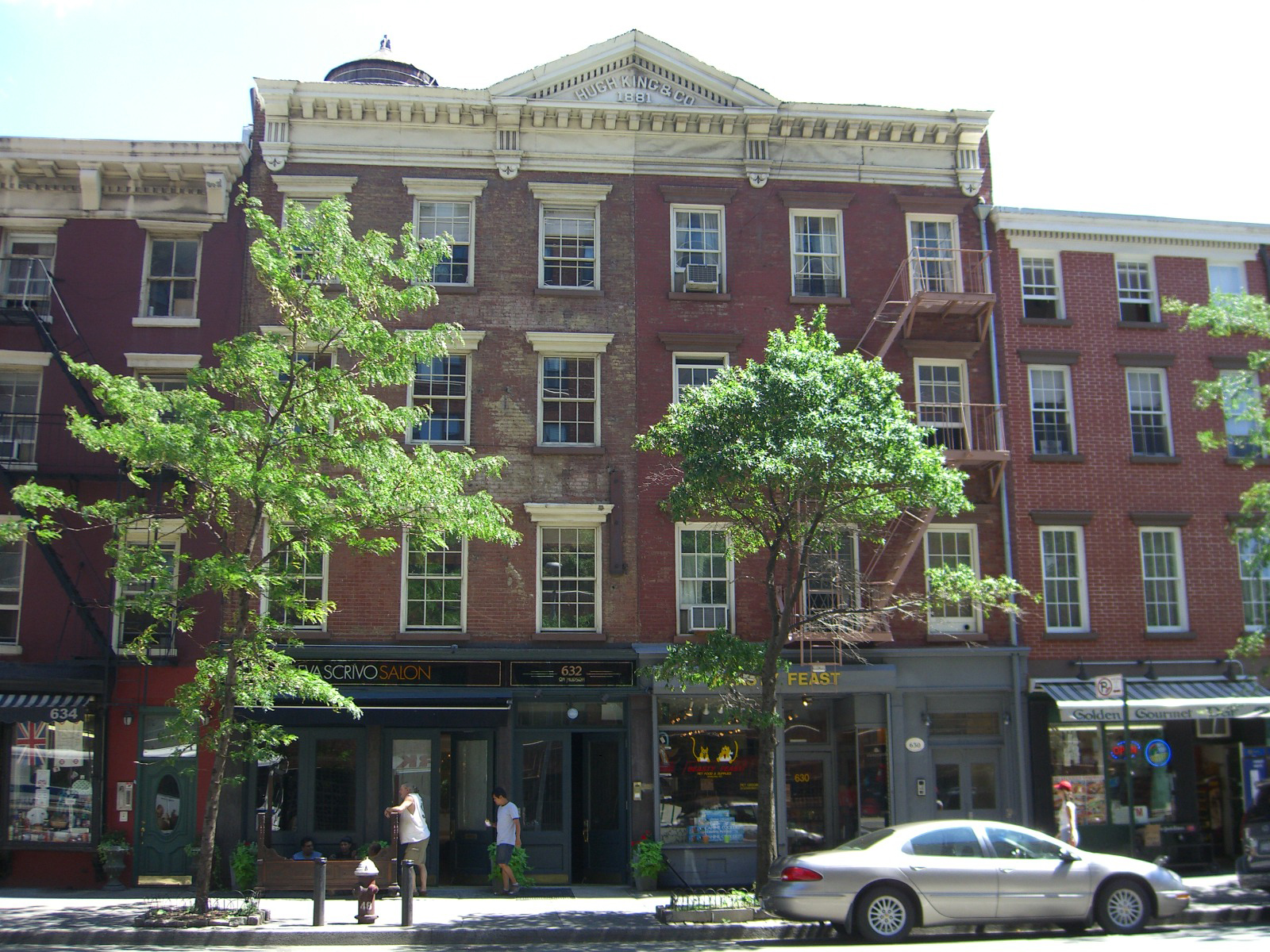
The loft at 632 Hudson Street in Manhattan's West Village where the cast lived.

The cast lived in an 8,000-square-foot (740 m^{2}), four story loft at 632 Hudson Street in Manhattan's West Village, just over a mile from the SoHo loft used in the filming of the first season. The building was built in 1847, and for forty years following World War II, housed a Spanish-style sausage factory called the Esteve Packing Corporation. The building was purchased in the early 1990s for $450,000. The 5,000-square-foot (460 m^{2}) third and fourth floors, which included the penthouse level and roof deck, were renovated for the series. The production equipment included 15 video cameras, 29 monitors, 142 studio lights, dozens of microphones, and a mile of cable. After completion of the season, the building was placed on the rental market for special events and short-term stays.

== Assignment ==
Participation in the assignment was mandatory for the cast, and a roommate who was terminated from the assignment would be evicted from the residence and from the cast. The Back to New York housemates were assigned jobs as receptionists for Arista Records during the day, and helped gain publicity for their up-and-coming bands at night.

== Cast ==
This season of Real World along with Road Rules: The Quest was the first and only season to be preceded by a casting special in which 27 potential cast members spent time together for a week to see how they interacted. Among the goings-on during the special was conflict between Coral and Ellen (who would eventually be cast on The Quest).

Cast member	Age (Note: Age at the time of filming.)	Hometown
Coral Smith	21	San Francisco, California
Coral is a 21-year-old part-time student and nanny living in San Francisco when she decided on a whim to audition for The Real World and Road Rules. Growing up, she experienced both privilege and poverty, living with her mother in government subsidized housing, and receiving an elite education through her father's savings. In the season premiere, she and Malik are offended at observations that Mike relates from his uncle about African Americans, and attempts to educate him by teaching him about people like Malcolm X.
Kevin Dunn	22	Austin, Texas
Kevin, who is described by MTV as popular, intelligent, athletic, and charming, was diagnosed with testicular cancer in his senior year in high school, and forced to reexamine things that others his age took for granted. His treatment and recovery endowed him with a "sharp sense of humor", as well as a deeper spirituality and sensitivity to others.
Nicole Mitsch	22	Atlanta, Georgia
Nicole is a graduating senior with a 4.0 grade point average at Morris Brown College. Her experiences include watching her mother suffer through a long, abusive relationship, and living in a government subsidized apartment, on which she pays $22 a month in rent. She is half African-American, half Caucasian, but is particularly proud of her African roots, and only dates black men.
Rachel Braband	18	Orland Park, Illinois
Rachel is an only child, raised by a single mom outside Chicago. MTV describes her as "wide-eyed, bubbly and ready for life". She is a pop-punk fanatic who loves concerts and buying CDs. She is still inexperienced in many ways, and looking to explore opportunities and new experiences while on the show, but sometimes experiences ridicule at the hands of Coral and Nicole.
Mike Mizanin	20	Parma, Ohio
Mike grew up as an only child with divorced parents in a predominantly white middle-class neighborhood in the suburbs of Cleveland. He found a sense of family within his college fraternity. He is sheltered due to growing up in a conservative part of the country and has never actively interacted with gays and African Americans. He dropped out of college in order to join the cast. While growing up, he says that his father was a racist. MTV describes him as a "fireball of energy" and a "chick magnet [who] is still naive about relationships, and has a deep need to be loved." Early in the season, he finds himself embroiled in debates with castmates Nicole and Coral over race. He exhibits a wrestler alter ego named "The Miz".
Lori Trespicio	21	Roseland, New Jersey
Lori, the winner of a MTV.com Online Casting contest that earned her a spot in the finalists' casting special pool, is half-Filipino, half-Irish, and the youngest of three daughters. An overachiever who excels at everything, her sisters labeled her early on as a "super star" child, though her passion is singing, and MTV describes her voice as "gorgeous". She was one of the lead vocalists in a Boston College singing group called the Bostonians. She is also a self-described "drama magnet" who gets bored unless she has some type of conflict in life. Lori developed feelings for Kevin, but he did not reciprocate the feelings beyond friendship. She was ranked #72 in Stuff Magazine's 2002 "102 Sexiest Women In The World".
Malik Cooper	23	Berkeley, California
Malik is the son of a white mother and black father. He is the first child in his family, and the only one of his friends, to attend college. He intends to graduate from the University of California at Berkeley, and is also a popular Bay Area club/party DJ. In one episode, Coral and Nicole are critical of Malik, who wears a Marcus Garvey t-shirt, but dates white women, which they see as a contradiction, since Garvey was against race mixing.

== Episodes ==
No. overall	No. in season	Title	Original release date
189	1	"Welcome to New York"	July 3, 2001
The cast members navigate New York City's subway system on their way to their home in Greenwich Village. As the roommates get to know one another, Lori's attraction to Kevin is obvious, and Mike unintentionally offends Coral, but hits it off with Rachel.
190	2	"Conveniently Single"	July 10, 2001
Mike offends Coral when he repeats an ignorant observation his uncle once shared with him. Also, Kevin continues to frustrate Lori with a series of mixed messages.
191	3	"Coral Vs. Mike"	July 17, 2001
Mike arouses Coral's wrath when he admits he doesn't know February is Black History Month; Nicole is attracted to a guy, but becomes turned off when she learns he voted for George W. Bush; and Malik's friend Namane visits---and judges Mike to be an okay guy, all things considered.
192	4	"Get a Nightlife!"	July 24, 2001
After her roommates persuade her to go out for a night on the town with a fake ID, Rachel meets a man who's too blunt for her tastes. Also, Kevin and Lori share a kiss, but he backpedals from its significance.
193	5	"Valentine's Day"	July 31, 2001
Mike and Coral butt heads over his visiting (female) friends, who are snubbed by all of the female roommates. Afterwards, at a house meeting, Mike and Coral have it out. Also: Mike tries to get into the girls' good graces by showering them with Valentine's Day gifts and cards.
194	6	"Get a Job"	August 7, 2001
The housemates learn what their new job entails: working as a "street marketing team" for Arista Records. Also: Coral is not pleased when, on their first day at work, she discovers she has to share a desk with Mike.
195	7	"Nicole vs. Malik"	August 14, 2001
Malik and Nicole argue over Malik's willingness to date outside his race, which Nicole does not condone. When Kevin attempts to stick up for Malik, Nicole turns her wrath on him.
196	8	"Lori's in a Band"	August 21, 2001
At home, Lori annoys her housemates with her singing. Meanwhile, on the job, the roomies are split into two teams responsible for recruiting focus groups to hear new rock artists. While Nicole, Rachel, Kevin and Malik don't take the work seriously, Mike, Coral and Lori do---and their effort shows. Also, Lori is invited to audition for a band.
197	9	"Coral and Nicole are Outkasts"	August 28, 2001
Nicole and Coral reduce Rachel to tears with their "teasing". Also, Nicole and Coral miss out on free concert tickets when they skip work to go shopping, then berate the others for their own miscue.
198	10	"Let's Go to Morocco"	September 4, 2001
The roommates travel to Morocco for a vacation, where they hook up with the "Road Rules" cast. Coral meets her match in Adam, who refuses to be bullied; and Rachel and Blair hit it off.
199	11	"Back to Reality"	September 18, 2001
Mike's friend Sarah visits from Ohio. In other events, a guitar-playing friend of Rachel's, on whom she has a crush, arrives in New York City, but the reunion turns awkward when he reveals he has a girlfriend.
200	12	"Lori Works It"	September 25, 2001
The roommates meet L.A. Reid, the president of Arista Records. Also: Coral and Nicole handle an in-store promotion by themselves; and Lori gives a demo CD to an Arista producer.
201	13	"Meet Mike's Parents"	October 2, 2001
Mike's parents visit and Kevin joins them for dinner. Also, Malik meets his father's family for the first time; and the roommates, except for Nicole (who's still not speaking to him), celebrate Malik's birthday.
202	14	"Virgin Margarita Party"	October 9, 2001
Fed up with being single, the female roommates vow to find dates for themselves before the month is out. Lori acts quickly, introducing herself to a cute doorman. Also: Rachel and Lori hang a special poster above Mike's bed, much to his dismay.
203	15	"Meet the Miz"	October 16, 2001
At work, the roommates compete in a window-display contest. Meanwhile, Mike and Nicole have an argument after Mike takes the van without telling her first; and, at home, Coral and Lori wrestle with Mike.
204	16	"Bobby Gets Puked On"	October 23, 2001
Nicole's friend Bobby visits, but her plan to seduce him takes a wrong turn when she indulges in too much alcohol and gets sick.
205	17	"Boston Road Trip"	October 30, 2001
Kevin meets a model named Beth; Lori and her housemates travel to Boston for her final show with her college singing group, the Bostonians.
206	18	"Jisela Rocks the House"	November 6, 2001
The "Road Rules" gang visits the house, and the casts of both shows head out for a night on the town. Also, Malik and Roadie Jisela get intimate; and Rachel and Coral butt heads over Rachel's unwillingness to clean.
207	19	"The Hamptons, Darling"	November 13, 2001
The housemates vacation in the Hamptons and are allowed to invite one guest each from the season's casting special. For Malik, that means Jisela ("Road Rules"); but his hopes for romance are dashed when Blair (also from "Road Rules") arrives. Also: Nicole invites her friend Bobby.
208	20	"Sex, Lies and Videotape"	November 20, 2001
In the Hamptons, Nicole makes no secret of her interest in Bobby. Also, Jisela's behavior makes Malik think twice about her and prompts a lecture from Coral; and Mike and Vanessa clown around in the shower, much to Rachel's chagrin.
209	21	"Hasta La Vista, Arista"	November 27, 2001
At work, the housemates are asked to persuade an NYC radio station to play a song by the rock band Adema. Also: Lori sings on a record producer's project; and the roomies head to CBGB.
210	22	"Bye, Bye NYC"	December 4, 2001
The housemates part ways, but not before reflecting on their time together. Mike and Coral come full circle, from squabbling to making peace, by sharing a pleasant dinner out. Also: tearful goodbyes as the various cast members leave the house; and "The Miz" takes one last run around the premises.

== After filming ==
At the 2008 The Real World Awards Bash, Coral won the "Roommate You Love to Hate" award.

After filming, Mike Mizanin parlayed his "Miz" persona into a career as a professional wrestler for WWE, where he has held several championship titles, including the WWE Intercontinental Championship, the World Tag Team Championship, the WWE Tag Team Championship, the WWE United States Championship, Unified Tag Team Championship, and the WWE Championship. He also main-evented WrestleMania XXVII defeating John Cena in 2011. Mizanin and Trishelle Cannatella of The Real World: Las Vegas appeared on Fear Factor, where they won first place. He currently stars on Miz & Mrs. alongside his wife, Maryse Ouellet. The couple welcomed two daughters: Monroe Sky Mizanin (born on March 27, 2018) and Madison Jade Mizanin (born on September 20, 2019). In 2021, The Miz competed on the 30th season of Dancing with the Stars.

Coral Smith gave birth to her daughter, Charlie Beatrice, in June 2013.

=== The Challenge ===
Cast member	Seasons of The Challenge
Coral Smith	Battle of the Seasons (2002), The Gauntlet, The Inferno, Battle of the Sexes 2, Fresh Meat, The Gauntlet III
Kevin Dunn	—N/a
Nicole Mitsch	—N/a
Rachel Braband	The Gauntlet
Mike Mizanin	Battle of the Seasons (2002), The Gauntlet, The Inferno, Battle of the Sexes 2, The Inferno II
Lori Trespicio	Battle of the Sexes
Malik Cooper	—N/a
