= Far (band) =

American rock band

- Origin: Sacramento, California, U.S.
- Genres: Post-hardcore; emo; alternative rock; alternative metal
- Years active: 1991–1999; 2008–2010
- Labels: Epic; Immortal; Vagrant; Bright Antenna
- Past members: Jonah Matranga; Shaun Lopez; John Gutenberger; Chris Robyn; Malcolm O'Keeffe

Far was an American rock band from Sacramento, California, formed in 1991. Although Far only experienced limited commercial success, the band had considerable influence on underground rock music. They are perhaps best known for their song "Mother Mary", from their record Water & Solutions.

== History ==
=== Original releases (1991–1998) ===
After a number of local releases including their first demo tape Sweat A River, Live No Lies (1991) and two independent albums Listening Game (1992) and Quick (1994) the band signed to Epic/Immortal Records and released their first major record. Tin Cans With Strings To You was recorded in September 1995 and released by Epic/Immortal on April 3, 1996. Their manager Troy Davis considers Tin Cans With Strings to be the first-ever screamo album. The song "Job's Eyes" was featured in an episode of Buffy the Vampire Slayer, titled "The Pack", which aired on April 7, 1997. Around this time, the band were being put on bills with artists such as Sepultura and Monster Magnet. Vocalist Jonah Matranga later recalled how the band would often get booed and abused by the audience at these shows.

Far's next release was a four-song EP titled Soon (1997), which featured two songs ("Bury White", "Mother Mary") that would later be included on their fourth and most popular album, Water & Solutions (1998). Water & Solutions was recorded in April 1997 and released on March 10, 1998. It was produced by Dave Sardy and attracted a strong cult following in the late 1990s, due mostly to the single "Mother Mary" and the band touring with longtime friends Deftones and Incubus. The more melodic sound showcased on this album is increasingly cited as an influence on alternative rock bands by the rock press, such as Papa Roach, Finch, and Funeral for a Friend.

=== Break-up and post-Far activities (1999–2007) ===
Since their 1999 split, the former members of Far have been involved in a number of projects, which were often experimental in nature. Frontman Jonah Matranga continued with his solo project Onelinedrawing and formed the now defunct band New End Original (an anagram of Onelinedrawing). Matranga "broke up" Onelinedrawing in August 2004. In 2005 the singer's new band Gratitude released their debut self-titled record on Atlantic Records. Gratitude, however, broke up near the end of 2005, playing their last US tour before splitting in December. He now plays music under his own name, with new work as well as music from his previous outings.

Guitarist and founder Shaun Lopez went on to form The Revolution Smile. The band has released two records and toured around the US and Europe. He also has his own studio where he has produced such bands as Trigger Point, Giant Drag, The X-Ecutioners, Deftones' fifth record Saturday Night Wrist, and Will Haven´s fourth record The Hierophant.

Bassist John Gutenberger is currently playing in a band with his wife, Caitlin, called Two Sheds.

Drummer Chris Robyn has since played several shows with Will Haven in 2000 when their drummer Wayne Morse left. He currently plays in the post-hardcore supergroup Black Map.

=== Reformation and second break-up (2008–2010) ===
In 2008, the band confirmed they will be reforming for a handful of US dates and a small UK tour. In 2010, Far's fifth and final studio album At Night We Live was released on May 25, 2010, through Vagrant Records.

On June 27, 2011, Jonah Matranga went on theFIVE10 Radio and said that it was not likely Far would be getting back together. He cited several problems but mainly that there was just "too much drama."

== Influences ==
Far have cited influences including Sunny Day Real Estate, Helmet, Fugazi, Led Zeppelin, the Promise Ring, Jawbox, Quicksand, Argent, the Revolution Smile, Strife, Snapcase, Neurosis, Jane’s Addiction, Rickie Lee Jones, Bad Brains, Neil Young, Prince and many of the bands on the labels Victory Records and Revelation Records.

== Members ==
- Jonah Matranga – vocals, guitar
- Shaun Lopez – guitar
- John Gutenberger – bass
- Chris Robyn – drums, percussion

== Discography ==
=== Studio albums ===
- Listening Game (1992)
- Quick (1994)
- Tin Cans with Strings to You (1996)
- Water & Solutions (1998)
- At Night We Live (2010)

=== Extended plays ===
- Soon (1997)

=== Singles ===
- "Pony" (2008)

=== Promos ===
- The System (with E-Bomb snippets) (1998)
- Mother Mary
- Love, American Style
- What I've Wanted to Say
- In the Aisle, Yelling (released on CD and cassette)
- Pony (one-track advance promo 4:23 on Vagrant) (2009)

=== 7"s ===
- Far Does Madonna (w/Sea Pigs)
- Boring Life
- Far / Incubus split w/ Water and Solutions
- Far / Incubus / Korn / Urge Split (Far song – In the Aisle Yelling) (1997 promo immortal)
- Far / Incubus Split (Far – Mother Mary; Incubus – Certain Shade of Green) (1998)
- Pony w/ Pony acoustic (2009)

=== Demos ===
- Sweat a River, Live No Lies (1991)
