= At Night We Live =

Studio album by Far
- Released: May 25, 2010
- Genres: Alternative rock, post-hardcore, emo
- Length: 41:51
- Label: Vagrant Records
- Producer: Shaun Lopez

Far chronology
Water & Solutions (1998)	At Night We Live (2010)

At Night We Live is the fifth and final studio album by American alternative rock band Far released on May 25, 2010. A few different pre-order packages were available, 500 of which included a limited-edition colored double LP.

The title track, according to frontman Jonah Matranga, was inspired by a dream he had, shortly following a hospital visit to see Deftones bassist Chi Cheng after he sustained severe brain trauma in a traffic accident.

== Track listing ==
All lyrics are written by Jonah Matranga; all music is composed by Matranga and Shaun Lopez, except where noted.

No.	Title	Length
1.	"Deafening"	3:10
2.	"If You Cared Enough"	3:37
3.	"When I Could See"	4:27
4.	"Give Me a Reason"	3:00
5.	"Dear Enemy"	3:33
6.	"Fight Song #16,233,241"	2:31
7.	"At Night We Live"	4:26
8.	"Burns" (Matranga)	2:27
9.	"Better Surrender"	2:59
10.	"Are You Sure?" (Matranga, Norman C. Brannon)	3:52
11.	"The Ghost That Kept on Haunting"	7:49
12.	"Pony" (Unlisted hidden track)

The European version also contains a cover version of PJ Harvey's "Long Snake Moan" from the album To Bring You My Love as track No. 13, plus one yet-unknown song at No. 12. "Pony", which is a Ginuwine cover, is not listed on the European version but appears as track No. 14.

== Personnel ==
- Jonah Matranga – vocals, guitar
- Shaun Lopez – guitar
- John Gutenberger – bass
- Chris Robyn – drums

== Critical reception ==
Professional ratings
Aggregate scores
Source	Rating
Metacritic	82/100
Review scores
Source	Rating
AllMusic	3/5 stars
Alternative Press	4.5/5 stars
Revolver	4/5 stars
Rock Sound	8/10
Sputnikmusic	4/5

The album was released to a positive reception by critics. As of August 2010, the album has received a 'Universal Acclaim' score of 82 on Metacritic.

Alternative Press stated, "It truly does feel as if they've been holding this emotion back since the day they parted and now unleashing everything in an explosion of creative energy, delivering a magnificent record that while fresh and exciting, could only be the work of far." BBC Music were equally full of praise; "At Night We Live is the best and the most confident album of their two-part career. It is also, admittedly, more commercial-sounding, but there’s no shame in that if it’s done with integrity, dignity and passion."

AllMusic were among those more reserved in their review, suggesting, "Perhaps the real issue here is that in their absence, the sound Far helped to push into the mainstream is now so common that they don’t feel as special as they once were. Fans of Far will be able to appreciate At Night We Live as a further evolution of Water & Solutions, but new listeners will have a hard time finding a fresh experience."
