= Jonah Matranga =

American musician (born 1969)

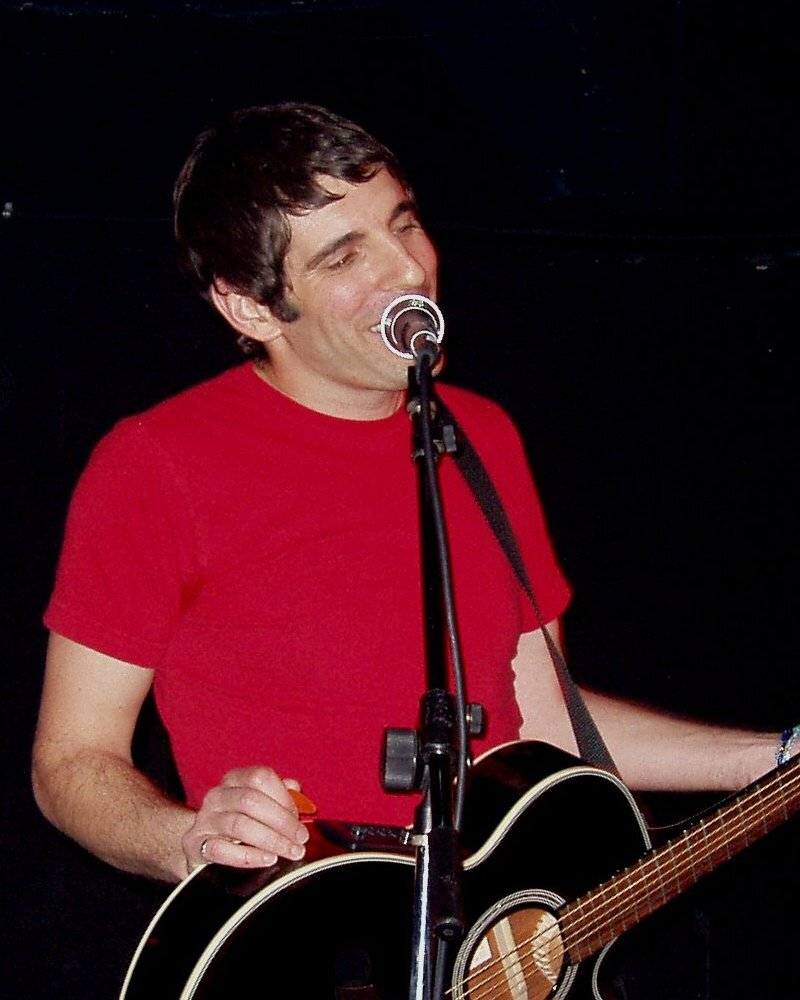

Background information
- Born: Jonah Sonz Matranga
- Origin: Brookline, Massachusetts, U.S.
- Genres: Alternative rock; indie rock; emo; post-hardcore; pop punk
- Occupations: Musician; songwriter
- Instruments: Vocals; guitar
- Years active: 1991–present
- Labels: Equal Vision; Jade Tree; Epic; Atlantic; Iodine
- Member of: Sons of Alpha Centauri
- Formerly of: Far; New End Original; Gratitude
- Website: jonahmatranga.com

Jonah Rzadzinski Matranga (born Jonah Sonz Matranga) is an American singer, songwriter and guitarist who has released a variety of solo material under his own name and onelinedrawing, and has previously been part of the bands Far and New End Original (an anagram of "onelinedrawing") and Gratitude. He now continues to work and tour under onelinedrawing.

== Biography ==
=== Early life ===
Jonah Rzadzinski Matranga grew up in Brookline, Massachusetts. He left in 1987 to attend Pitzer College in Claremont, California, where he majored in English and began making music by himself. After graduation, he moved to Sacramento to form Far in 1991.

They made four albums, including Water & Solutions, before disbanding in December 1998. During this time, Matranga married in April 1994, and his daughter was born that August. He divorced two years later. In 1999, he moved to the Bay Area. He currently lives in Portland, making music and raising his daughter.

=== Solo career and New End Original ===
After the demise of Far, Matranga began to perform with a tape recorder and touring under the name onelinedrawing, which had been the name of a cassette he had released on Kevin Seconds's Pop Rockit Records. He released two EPs in 1999 (Sketchy EP #1 and #2) of bedroom demos. He put out two further EPs in 2001 – Always New JanJun00 and Always New JulDec00.

In 2000, Matranga formed and fronted New End Original, a band that primarily performed full-band versions of onelinedrawing songs. With the lineup completed by Texas Is The Reason alumni Scott Winegard (bass) and Norman Arenas (guitar), and drummer Charlie Walker (ex-Chamberlain), they released one album, Thriller, and a single for "Lukewarm".

Much of his solo material has also been self-released, though often subsequently distributed through labels such as Crank! and Corrupted Image. However, Matranga's two full-length onelinedrawing albums, Visitor (2002) - a compilation of acoustic-based home recordings spanning a few years - and The Volunteers (2004) were released by Jade Tree Records.

The Volunteers possessed a more polished sound – courtesy of mixer Dave Sardy, who had previously worked with Matranga on Far's Water & Solutions.

Matranga retired the onelinedrawing moniker in 2004 and intended to put all future solo releases under his name. In December 2004, Matranga began offering custom-made recordings of songs by himself or others through his website, in order to offer a one-of-a-kind musical art piece.

In 2005, Matranga put out Sketchy EP #3, as well as a DVD, There's a Lot in Here, both of which were available on a sliding scale ("pay what you can") from Matranga's online store. The DVD There's a Lot in Here was re-released with a bonus CD on February 21, 2006, through Equal Vision Records.

Matranga's song "Crush on Everyone" was featured in the soundtrack to the 2008 John Humber film Dakota Skye, and "Got My List" was sung by the movie's protagonists.

=== Guest appearances ===
Matranga has contributed backup vocals to War All the Time (by Thursday) on the track "Steps Ascending", to the Deftones's acoustic remix version of "Be Quiet and Drive (Far Away)", and to a cover of Sade's song "No Ordinary Love", both of which the Deftones released as b-sides. Several Deftones members contributed to Far's cover of the Jawbox song "Savory".

Matranga has also contributed to previous Matt Nathanson releases, a song called "Swamp" for Tweaker (a.k.a. Chris Vrenna, former member of Nine Inch Nails), which ended up a b-side for the album The Attraction to All Things Uncertain, and to two Fort Minor songs for the album The Rising Tied: "Red to Black" with Kenna; and the single "Where'd You Go" with Holly Brook, where he also appears in the video. "Where'd You Go" reached the #4 spot on the Billboard Hot 100.

Matranga's name does not appear on the title card before and after the video, though he is credited on the album. He attributed his video anonymity (jokingly) to his name being too long and "music biz yuck". He often expresses his negative opinion of the music industry's business ethics.

In 2005, Matranga co-wrote "Calling" for Taproot, the first single from their album Blue-Sky Research. He also appeared on Food & Liquor, the debut album for Lupe Fiasco, on the track entitled "The Instrumental", which also appeared on the Madden NFL 07 soundtrack. Jonah sings a hook ("And he never lied, 'cause he never said anything at all") directly taken from the lyrics from "Nestle", a song from the Far album Water & Solutions. The track was produced by Mike Shinoda of Linkin Park and Fort Minor.

Matranga has also lent his vocals on Atlanta-based band [minus]'s (later changed to [minus driver]) song "Hesitant and Polite" which appeared on their album Structure of Simplicity.

Matranga returned to the onelinedrawing name in 2012 for Audio Antihero label's Some.Alternate.Universe compilation for the FSID charity. He contributed "Friendship Tango". Matranga sang backing vocals for Zebulon-Raleigh, North Carolina–based songwriter Nick Driver's independent release Poets' Corner Volume One track titled "Universal Love" in late 2012.

In August 2021, UK stoner/post-rock band Sons of Alpha Centauri released their album Push featuring Matranga as guest vocalist on all nine tracks. This was a notable departure from the band's formerly instrumental sound.

== Discography ==
=== Solo releases ===
- Jonah Sonz Matranga – Songs I Hope My Mom Will Like (1994)
- Jonah Matranga – Jonah's One-line Drawing (1998 Poprockit)
- Jonah's Onelinedrawing – Sketchy EP #1 (1999)
- Jonah's Onelinedrawing – Sketchy EP #2 (2000)
- onelinedrawing/Sense Field – Split EP (2000)
- onelinedrawing/Rival Schools – Rival Schools United by Onelinedrawing (2001)
- onelinedrawing – Always New Jan-Jun 2000 (online 2000, CD 2001)
- onelinedrawing – Always New Jul-Dec 2000 (online 2000, CD 2002)
- onelinedrawing – Always New 2001 (online 2001 only)
- onelinedrawing – Visitor (2002 Jade Tree)
- onelinedrawing – The Volunteers (2004 Jade Tree)
- Jonah Matranga – There's a Lot in Here (2005 Ewusl Vision)
- Jonah Matranga – Sketchy EP #3 (2005)
- Jonah Matranga / Frank Turner Split – Split 12 inch vinyl (2006)
- Jonah Matranga – The Three Sketchys (2006)
- Jonah Matranga – And (2007 Limekiln Records (USA)). (Also released on Blacktop in Canada, Arctic Rodeo in Germany, Daymare in Japan, Xtra Mile in UK and Yr Letter Records in France.)
- Jonah Matranga – And Furthermore (And B-Sides & Acoustic Versions)
- Jonah Matranga – Fort Teen (2009) 100 hand numbered, hand made cd of home recordings between 1984–87
- Jonah Matranga / Kevin Seconds – split 7 inch vinyl (December 2009) (Blacktop – Canada)
- Jonah Matranga – You're 16, You're 23, You're 32 (DIY boxset) (2009)
- Jonah Matranga – You're All Those Things And Then You're None (2010)
- Jonah's Onelinedrawing – Me and You are Two (2014)
- Jonah Matranga / Mikee J Reds Countrysides EP, "Sweet Life" "Secret World"
- Onelinedrawing - Tenderwild (2022)
- onelinedrawing - Rainbowmachine (2026)

==== The Three Sketchys ====
The Three Sketchys (1999-2005) is an anthology containing the contents of three albums:

- Sketchy EP #1 by Onelinedrawing (1999)
- Sketchy EP #2 by Onelinedrawing (2000)
- Sketchy EP #3 by Jonah Matranga (2005)

along with a bonus track: a new mix of "The Big Parade" from Sketchy EP #2. The recordings span 1999–2005 and are described by the artist as a collection of "homemade" tracks spanning several years. It was released in 2006 by OLD Records, a self-managed label by Jonah Matranga.

=== Band releases ===
- Far – Sweat a River, Live No Lies (1991 Enharmonik Studios)
- Far – Listening Game (1992 Rusty Nail Records)
- Far – Quick (1994 Our Own Records)
- Far – Tin Cans With Strings To You (1996 Epic/Immortal)
- Far – Soon EP (1997 Epic/Immortal)
- Far – Water & Solutions (1998 Epic/Immortal)
- Far – At Night We Live (2010 Vagrant)
- Far – Pony 7" on Bright Antenna (December 2009)
- New End Original' – Lukewarm single (2001 Jade Tree)
- New End Original – Thriller (2001 Jade Tree)
- Gratitude – Gratitude (2005 Atlantic)
- Gratitude – Drive Away single (2005 Atlantic)
- Gratitude – This Is the Part EP (written as This Is th EP Art) (2005)
- I Is Another – I Is Another (2013 Arctic Rodeo Recordings)
- Camorra – Mourning, Resistance, Celebration (2017 Arctic Rodeo Recordings)
- Sons of Alpha Centauri – Push (2021 Exile on Mainstream Records)
- Sons of Alpha Centauri – Pull (2024 Exile on Mainstream Records)

=== iTunes Releases ===
- I Believe Barack Obama 2009
- I Still Miss Someone (J.Cash Cover) 2009
- What Beyonce Said To Jay-Z Before She Left Him For Me (Irreplaceable Cover) 2009
- Live in Rotterdam December 15, 2007 (15 song set with new, old and cover songs) 2009
- Live at Hotel Cafe, LA, CA May 6, 2009 (various songs and various covers) 2009
- Live in Rotterdam DIY Download 2009-07-14 (17 song set with Iamani)
- Live in Amsterdam DIY Download 15/07/09 (14 song set)
- Live in Leuven DIY Download 2/03/09 (17 song set)
- Random Covers, Vol.1 DIY Download (11 homemade recordings of various covers) 2009

=== Books ===
- Jonah Matranga – Alone Rewinding: 23 Years of Fatherhood and Music (2017)

=== Television appearances ===
- The Classroom Series – Season 1: Episode 1 "Alone Rewinding with Jonah Matranga" (October 16, 2017) first aired November 6, 2017
