= From Monument to Masses =

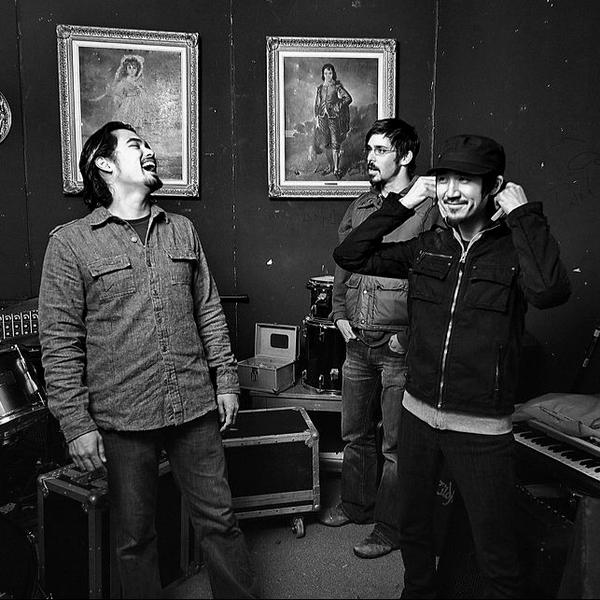

Background information
- Origin: San Francisco, California
- Genres: Post-rock, post-punk, ambient music, electronic music
- Years active: December 2000–2010
- Labels: Dim Mak (North America), Catune Records (Japan), Golden Antenna Records (EU), Audiolith Records (EU)
- Members: Francis Choung; Sergio Robledo-Maderazo; Matthew Solberg

From Monument to Masses was a politically charged post-rock band which was founded in San Francisco in late 2000. They have released four albums to date, the latest full-length of which was released through Dim Mak on March 10, 2009. They played their final show on August 28, 2010, at the Great American Music Hall in San Francisco, California.

== Overview ==
From Monument to Masses is an instrumental post-rock power trio composed of Francis Choung (drums, keys, programming), Sergio Robledo-Maderazo (bass, keys, samples), and Matthew Solberg (guitar, loops). From Monument To Masses is officially a "bi-coastal" band with two members living in the California Bay Area (Robledo-Maderazo, Solberg) and one residing in New York City (Choung). The band formed in 2000 in the San Francisco area, and eventually signed to Dim Mak Records in 2002. The band's first album, From Monument To Masses, was initially intended to be a demo recording to find a label; however, when Dim Mak's label owner Steve Aoki, who was also a long-time friend of Robledo-Maderazo from the Southern California Hardcore scene and his UCSB classmate, heard the recording, he signed the band and decided to release it as an eponymous debut LP.

The band name is a challenge to the "Great man theory" and a call for a paradigm shift. Rather than subscribe to the notion that "highly influential individuals" to whom monuments are built shape historical developments, the band name posits that it is actually the masses struggling for change who make history. In several interviews, that band has cited the American Civil Rights Movement as an example and note the hard work of hundreds of organizers that often gets overshadowed in history books by admittedly important individuals. The band members have often explained in interviews that their music is only one expression of their respective politics. Each member has been involved with various organizations throughout the life of the band, including the League of Filipino Students-SFSU, Challenging White Supremacy, Kalayaan School for Equity, BAYAN USA, and others.

== Members ==
- Francis Choung - drums, keys, programming
- Sergio Robledo-Maderazo - bass, keys, samples
- Matthew Solberg - guitar, loops

== Discography ==
=== Albums ===
- From Monument To Masses (album)|From Monument To Masses (2002)
- The Impossible Leap in One Hundred Simple Steps (2003)
- Schools of Thought Contend (December 31, 2005)
- On Little Known Frequencies (March 10, 2009)

=== Singles ===
- "Beyond God & Elvis" (2008)

== Influences ==
According to the band's MySpace website , the band culls their "sound" from several influences, some of which include:

- Refused
- Fugazi
- Godspeed You! Black Emperor
- DJ Shadow
- At the Drive-In
- Dead Prez
- Tortoise
- Radiohead
- Led Zeppelin
- Mogwai
- Don Caballero
- Rage Against the Machine
- Digable Planets
