= BLK (magazine) =

American LGBT magazine

- Editor: Alan Bell
- Categories: Newsmagazine
- Frequency: Monthly
- Circulation: 37,000 per month
- Publisher: Alan Bell
- First issue: December 1988
- Final issue: 1994
- Company: BLK Publishing Company, Inc.
- Country: USA
- Based in: Los Angeles
- Language: English
- Website: http://www.blk.com
- ISSN: 1043-0075

BLK was a monthly American news magazine,which targeted African-American LGBT readers.

Published in Los Angeles, the magazine was initially distributed free of charge to local black establishments frequented by lesbians and gay men, but distribution rapidly expanded to nearly all LGBT venues in Greater Los Angeles. Its early coverage of the local black LGBT scene soon expanded to a nationwide and international focus, and eventually to national and Canadian distribution.

Sub-titled "The National Black Lesbian and Gay Newsmagazine", with the motto "where the news is colored on purpose," BLK took its name from the standard abbreviation used in U.S. personal ads for "black".

== History ==
Alan Bell, an African-American graphic designer who had published Gaysweek for three years in New York City during the late 1970s, was urged to start a news periodical for black lesbians and gay men by black LGBT HIV/AIDS activists such as Phill Wilson. Bell initially hesitated to go back to publishing, but there was a dearth of reliable information in print about African-American LGBT people and the HIV crisis which he noticed at Black Jack, the black gay men's safer sex club that he had founded in Los Angeles. Eventually he concluded that the next step from the eight-page newsletter he was producing monthly for members of Black Jack was expansion, and BLK was born. Bell set out to establish BLK as a regular, predominantly hard news alternative to the infotainment-oriented publications that intermittently appeared in America's black gay communities.

Bell chose the magazine's name to adhere to a tradition among national African-American publications of employing racially indicative titles (e.g., Ebony, Jet, Sepia). Initially pronounced as is the word "black", use of the initials in spoken English gradually became customary.

Beginning as a 16-page black-and-white newsprint publication in 1988, it grew to 40 pages with glossy color covers, paid circulation, and national product advertising by the time it ceased publication in mid-1994.

== Content and coverage ==
Although the first issue had a beefcake cover (a muscular black man clad only in a Santa hat and whiskers, partially covered by the magazine's logo), subsequent covers usually pictured a prominent African-American LGBT person featured in the "BLK Interview" section, or illustrated a theme of the month.

Among those interviewed were singer Patti LaBelle (August 1990); porn star Randy Cochran (March 1989); poet Audre Lorde (April 1989); founder of the Minority AIDS Project Carl Bean (July 1989), Black AIDS Institute founder Phill Wilson (October 1990); activist Cleo Manago (March 1990); documentary filmmaker Marlon Riggs (April 1990); and Gay Men's Health Crisis CEO Marjorie Hill (August 1990).

== Complete list of cover stories ==
Date	Whole	Vol.	No.	Cover Story	Cover Person
December 1988	1	1	1	"Santa Claus"	
January 1989	2	1	2	"Remembering Sylvester"	Sylvester
February 1989	3	1	3	"J'ai, The Lady Sings the Blues"	J'ai
March 1989	4	1	4	"Randy Cochran"	Randy Cochran
April 1989	5	1	5	"Oh, Lorde"	Audre Lorde
May 1989	6	1	6	"Talking about Ayofemi"	Ayofemi Stowe Folayan
June 1989	7	1	7	"It Happened to Me"	Roger V Pamplin, Jr.
July 1989	8	1	8	"Rev. Carl Bean"	Carl Bean
August 1989	9	1	9	"James Baldwin"	James Baldwin
September 1989	10	1	10	"Working Inside"	Keith St. John
October 1989	11	1	11	"Black and Not Gay"	George Stallings Jr.
November 1989	12	1	12	"The Many Faces of Jewel"	Jewel Thais-Williams
December 1989	13	1	13	"Sgt. Perry Watkins"	Perry Watkins
January 1990	14	2	1	"Job Discrimination"	
February 1990	15	2	2	"Lavender Light"	
March 1990	16	2	3	"Cleo Manago"	Cleo Manago
April 1990	17	2	4	"Marlon Riggs"	Marlon Riggs
May 1990	18	2	5	"Volunteerism"	(Michael Jones)
June 1990	19	2	6	"Barbara Smith"	Barbara Smith
July 1990	20	2	7	"Pride at Home"	(Nedra Johnson and Dionne Freeny)
August 1990	21	2	8	"Climbing the Hill"	Marjorie Hill
September 1990	22	2	9	"Audre Lorde"	Audre Lorde
October 1990	23	2	10	"Phill Wilson"	Phill Wilson
November 1990	24	2	11	"The Road to Michigan"	(Lauren Metoyer and Yolanda Whittington)
December 1990	25	2	12	"All in the Family"	Ivy Young
January 1991	26	3	1	"Clauras and Wendies"	
February 1991	27	3	2	"Heading for Home"	James Cleveland
March 1991	28	3	3	"Tax Strategies"	(Mitchell El-Mahdy)
April 1991	29	3	4	"No Peace"	(Willis Oliver, Jr.)
May 2009	30	3	5	"Has Winnie Lost It?"	Winnie Mandela
June 1991	31	3	6	"Joe Simmons"	Joe Simmons
July 1991	32	3	7	"High Risk, Low Priority"	(Emanuel Tapp)
August 1991	33	3	8	"Young, Gifted and Fierce"	Pomo Afro Homos
October 1991	34	3	9	"La Belle Epoque"	Patti LaBelle
January 1992	35	4	1	"Steven Corbin"	Steven Corbin
May 1992	36	4	2	"Black Lesbian Women in the Wild"	(Lisa Mitchell and Titia Ingram)
September 1992	37	4	3	"Out of Fashanu"	Justin Fashanu
December 1993	38	4	4	"Rupaul: Gag on the Calendar"	RuPaul
January 1994	39	5	1	"Do They Know that the Mayor of Cambridge is Gay?"	Kenneth Reeves
February 1994	40	5	2	"Mandy Carter Anti-War Activist"	Mandy Carter
March 1994	41	5	3	"Must Men Who Love Boys Be Guilty?"	Michael Jackson

== Sister publications ==
The company that published BLK also published several other titles directed to the black LGBT community including Blackfire, an erotic magazine for men; Black Lace, an erotic magazine for women; Kuumba, a poetry journal; Black Dates, a calendar of events in Southern California, and The BLK Guide to Southern California for Black People in the Life. In 1999, the company acquired Mentor, a gay non-black publication focusing on adult intergenerational relationships. Blackfire and Kuumba are still in publication.
