= Gilberto Gerald =

Afro-Panamanian gay rights and AIDS activist

- Born: November 27, 1950 (age 75); Panama City, Panama
- Other name: Gil
- Citizenship: Panama (by birthplace), United States^{[explain status]}
- Known for: Gay rights and AIDS activism

Gilberto Gerald (born November 27, 1950), more commonly known as Gil, is an Afro-Panamanian activist, essayist and architect. He is known for HIV/AIDS activism, and LGBT rights in the United States.

== Life ==
Gerald was born on 27 November 1950, in Panama City, Panama. He was raised there before moving to Ghana, Trinidad and Tobago, and then finally to the United States at 17 years old, where he completed high school. He came out as gay while studying architecture at the Pratt Institute in New York City, where he was the president of a fraternity.

Gerald was born into a family of three brothers. His father is Alfred Nelson Gerald, the former Inspector General of Health of the Republic of Panama and former PAHO official, and his mother is Dorothy Whiteman Gerald. Roque Gerald, the former director of the Washington, D.C. Child and Family Services Agency, is one of his younger brothers. His older brother, Alpha Gerald, died in August 1985. His family spoke both Spanish and English while he was growing up.

After a process of four years, Gerald became a naturalized United States citizen in 1980.

Gerald retired in 2016 and lives in Palm Springs, California with his husband, Jeff. He is currently writing a memoir on his life and activism.

== Activism ==
After graduating from the Pratt Institute with a bachelor's degree in architecture, Gerald moved to Washington, D.C. and worked as an architect. He became involved with local activist organizations after being inspired by a chance encounter with ABilly S. Jones-Hennin.

Gerald was a co-founder of the National Coalition of Black Lesbians and Gays (NCBLG) in 1978 (initially named the National Coalition of Black Gays), alongside other activists including ABilly S. Jones-Hennin, Darlene Garner, Delores P. Berry, Louis Hughes, Rev. Renee McCoy, and John Gee. The goal of the organization was to support the interests of Black gays and lesbians, since many LGBTQ organizations were discrimatory towards them.

In 1979, Gerald and the NCBLG organized the National Third World Lesbians and Gays Conference during the first March on Washington for Lesbian and Gay Rights.

In 1983, Gerald was elected as the executive director of NCBLG. He organized a sit-in protest at the office of D.C. delegate Walter Fauntroy when the organizers of the 20th anniversary of the 1963 March on Washington were resistant to including LGBTQ organizations. This protest, and the arrests of activists Ray Melrose, Melvin Boozer, Phil Pannell, and Gary Walker, attracted the attention of civil rights figures like Coretta Scott King, Joseph Lowery, and Benjamin Hooks. Along with activist Virginia Apuzzo, Gerald helped ensure that Audre Lorde spoke at the march. Afterwards, King publicly endorsed the addition of gays and lesbians to the 1964 Civil Rights Act.

In 1986, the NCBLG held the National Conference on AIDS in the Black Community at the D.C. convention center, resulting in the creation of the National Minority AIDS Council in 1987, which Gerald founded alongside activists including Carl Bean and Craig G. Harris.

During the National Conference on AIDS in the Black Community, Gerald (with activists like Suki Ports and Carl Bean) spoke for two and a half hours with C. Everett Koop, the U.S. Surgeon General, who had not previously been aware of the disproportionate impact of AIDS on communities of color. This conversation resulted in additions to Koop's report, "Understanding AIDS," which was mailed to every home in the nation in 1988.

This same year, Gerald left the NCBLG, which disbanded a few years later. On the disbanding, Gerald said that he believed that the organization just hadn't been designed to address the issues of HIV/AIDS. The National Minority AIDS Council is still in operation.

Gerald was the director of minority affairs for the National AIDS Network in Washington, DC, focusing on the needs of Black and gay people living with HIV/AIDS. During this time, he spoke as an educator on AIDS in the gay community on multiple occasions.

After moving to Los Angeles, California in 1989, Gerald became the executive director of the National Minority AIDS Council when Carl Bean stepped down.

Gerald would continue to be a prominent organizer within HIV/AIDS and LGBTQ organizations in California, including the AIDS Project Los Angeles, Gentlemen Concerned, and the Black Coalition on AIDS.

He founded the LGBTQ consulting firm Gil Gerald & Associates, Inc. in 1991, which assisted non-profits and government agencies with LGBTQ topics until Gerald's retirement in 2016.

== Writing and appearances ==
Gerald's work, "The Trouble I've Seen" (1987), is included in Freedom in This Village: Twenty-Five Years of Black Gay Men's Writing, 1979 to the Present, a 2005 anthology of black gay male literature by E. Lynn Harris. His writing and essays have appeared in other anthologies and magazines, including several connected to activist and writer Joseph Beam, as well as the NCBLG's magazine Black/Out.

One of his presentations that Gerald made during his time with the National AIDS Network in Washington, DC, made at a seminar at the SUNY Health and Science Center at Brooklyn, was adapted into an article and published in the Journal of the National Medical Association in April 1989.

In January 2024, Gerald appeared on an episode of WNYC Studios' Blindspot podcast titled Mourning in America alongside people like Valerie Reyes-Jimenez, Phill Wilson, and Dr. Anthony Fauci to discuss the history of the HIV/AIDS crisis.

== Works (selected) ==
- "With My Head Held Up High" (In the life: a Black gay anthology, Joseph Beam, Alyson Publications, 1986, page 35)
- "Hey, Joe. You Have Got To Tell the Story: Recalling My Brother/Sister Joseph Beam" (Black gay genius: answering Joseph Beam's call, Vintage Entity Press, 2014, page 40)
- "The Trouble I've Seen" (Freedom in This Village: Twenty-Five Years of Black Gay Men's Writing, 1979 to the Present, E. Lynn Harris, Carroll & Graf, 2005)

== See also ==
- National Minority AIDS Council
- Black gay pride
- LGBT movements in the United States
- HIV/AIDS activism
