= Venus (magazine) =

LGBT magazine with African American readership

- Categories: Newsmagazine; Lifestyle magazine LGBT magazine
- Frequency: 4 - 6 times per year
- Founder: Charlene Cothran, publisher
- First issue: January 1995
- Final issue: 2006-2007
- Company: Cothran Publications
- Country: United States
- Based in: Atlanta, Georgia (1995-1997); Hastings-on-Hudson, New York (1998-2006)
- Language: English
- Website: www.venusmagazine.com (defunct)

Venus was an American newsmagazine targeted to LGBT people of color, particularly African-Americans. Established in 1995, Venus was the first national LGBT magazine founded by a lesbian, Charlene Cothran. The magazine was named in honor of Venus Landin (1961–1993), a friend of Cothran's who was murdered by her former lover. At its peak, Venus was distributed to seventy-two locations across the United States, Canada, and major cities in Europe. The magazine featured noteworthy commentary and ground-breaking articles on issues related to the African-American LGBT community. In 2006, the magazine and its founding publisher changed editorial focus and sexual identity. Following a decrease in advertising revenue, Venus ceased operations by 2007.

== History ==
In 1991, Charlene Cothran, Venus's founding publisher, participated in the annual National Lesbian Conference (NLC). The Atlanta event attracted 2,500 women, including artists and writers. Cothran, who served on the NLC hospitality committee, first discussed publishing a new LGBT magazine, specifically “by, for, and about lesbian, gay, bisexual, and transgender people of African descent, with a focus on African-American lesbians and Atlanta.”

=== Venus Landin ===
On March 2, 1993, Venus Landin, co-chair of the African-American Gay Lesbian Alliance of Atlanta, was murdered by her former lover, Bisa Niambi. Niambi fatally shot Landin three times, and then killed herself in a murder-suicide. Cothran was with Landin in the days preceding her murder and helped her friend to retrieve her personal belongings from her ex-lover's residence.

The 1993 Atlanta Gay Pride Festival and festivities were dedicated to the memory of Venus Landin (May 17, 1961 - March 2, 1993).

=== Venus Magazine ===
Venus was the first national LGBT magazine owned and operated by a lesbian, and after Landin's murder, Cothran dedicated and named Venus magazine to honor her friend.

The first issue of Venus was distributed in January 1995. The aim of the magazine was to be a platform for Black LGBT voices. A profile of Phill Wilson, a gay African-American HIV/AIDS activist and Grand Marshall of the 1995 Martin Luther King parade in Atlanta, appeared in the first issue. The magazine was available for free and placed in twenty locations in Atlanta, including LGBT bars, bookstores, and restaurants. By November 1995, Venus was available in seventy-two locations across the U.S., including distribution points in Atlanta, Los Angeles, New Orleans, and Philadelphia.

In 1996, Venus had a press run of 8,000 issues and was circulated in several cities with large LGBT populations. Venus publisher and editor-in-chief Cothran was featured in an episode of ”In the Life,” the longest running LGBTQ news magazine on television. That same year, a group of Black gay press editors and publishers gathered in Washington, DC, to network and to discuss the expansion of publications directed towards African-Americans LGBT citizens who may not respond to or subscribe to mainstream LGBT publications.

=== Venus moves to New York ===
In 1998, Venus moved its headquarters from Atlanta to the New York City area, and published four to six issues per year. An annual subscription to Venus would cost $14.95. The Washington Blade featured an article on Cothran and her efforts to promote and expand Venus.

In the late 1990s, Venus published “The Venus Healthy Living Pocket Guide,” a booklet that included health information targeted to the African-American community. The guide was distributed for free, and funded by Bristol-Myers Squibb.

Throughout its history, Venus’s goal was to provide news and information for LGBT people of color and to be a resource for the African-American LGBT community. Venus is considered one of the most influential Black LGBTQ periodicals.

In the early 2000s, Venus contributed magazines and materials to The Black Gay and Lesbian Archive Project. The project was donated to the Schomburg Center for Research in Black Culture in 2004, and later renamed the “In the Life Archive.” Venus is credited with donating issues and magazine records to the Auburn Avenue African American Lesbian and Gay Print Culture collection; the magazine's donation helped to establish the collection.

In 2006, Cothran changed the editorial policy of Venus and declared herself a former lesbian. LGBT advertisers dwindled, and Venus magazine ceased operations by 2007.

== Notable coverage ==
Venus was credited with breaking ground in several editorial areas, such as educational resources for HIV and AIDS prevention and care, dialogue between closeted and open LGBT populations, black gays and lesbians in corporate America, politics concerning homophobia, and the relationship between Christianity and homosexuality, among others.

Early issues of Venus documented several Atlanta LGBT organizations and social spaces, including the African American Lesbian Gay Alliance, Brothers Back-2-Back, Hospitality Atlanta, Loretta's, Marquette Lounge, Pearl Garden, SisterLove Inc., Sisters of 30 Something Special, Traxx, and ZAMI NOBLA, a national organization for Black lesbians over the age of forty. In 1995, Venus published information about Redefined Faith Unity Fellowship Church (later renamed Redefined Faith Worship Center), a group that is credited with being the first religious congregation designed for Black LGBTQ individuals in Atlanta. In addition, national gay religious leaders Carl Bean and Bishop Zachary Jones, the Unity Fellowship Church Movement, and Atlanta's Second Sunday Discussion Group were profiled in Venus.

In 1997, Venus co-produced, in conjunction with the Human Rights Campaign, Second Sunday, and ZAMI, the Bayard Rustin Rally in Atlanta to highlight activism and traditions of the Southern Black LGBT community. This rally laid the foundation for the annual Bayard Rustin/Audre Lorde Breakfast, which attracts several hundred people. An historical article on A'Lelia Walker, the daughter of Madam C. J. Walker, the first female self-made millionaire in the United States, appeared in a Venus issue. LaTanya Junior, an advertising agency CEO and a former executive with Stedman Graham and Partners, was featured on a Venus cover and profiled in a magazine interview.

In 1998, Venus published “Black Gays in Corporate America,” a seminal article that highlighted Ronald L. Moore, an executive at Hewlett-Packard, who, at the time, was recognized as the “highest-ranking, openly gay or lesbian African-American at a Fortune 500 company.” Two years after its original publication, Venus published a follow-up story, "Black and Gay in Corporate America." The next national magazine profile of African-American gay and lesbian executives would occur more than a decade later (see Black Enterprise, July 2011).

In a 2000 Venus issue, the magazine covered the National Association of Black and White Men Together’s protest of the Millennium March on Washington, and the event’s lack of black LGBT participation. Venus took the lead amongst LGBT publication in profiling the Mumia Abdul-Jamal murder trial and the April 2000 Madison Square Garden protest to demand justice for Abdul-Jamal, the former Black Panther who is an advocate for LGBT justice.

Tony Award-winning choreographer Bill T. Jones was profiled in and featured on the cover of Venus. A 1995 issue feature “Mary and Lou,” depicted a fictional story about a lesbian couple written by Shirlene Holmes. A story on Cleveland's black gay community, including the first Cleveland International Black Gay Film Festival and photos from the Gay Men of African Descent’s 7th annual benefit fashion show also appeared in Venus. Venus first reported on the planning for Atlanta's inaugural Black Gay Pride Celebration in 1995.

Venus profiled “10 Men You need to know!” in 1997, a cover story that included profiles of: Cordell Adams, MD; A. Cornelius Baker (1961–2024); Keith Boykin; Mario Cooper (1954–2015); Rodney Gooden; Cary Alan Johnson; Cleo Manago; H. Alexander Robinson (H Alexander Satorie-Robinson); Milton Simpson; and Steve Wakefield. That same year, Venus profiled the National Black Lesbian and Gay Leadership Forum (1988–2003) and its board of directors: Joy Barnes, Brenda Crawford, Joan Fountain, Sherry Harris, Ron Johnson, Rhonda Mundhenk, Steve Oxendine, Michael C. Piper, Debra Rose, and Steve Walker, as well as the organization's 10th anniversary conference in Long Beach, California.

In 1999, Venus profiled Ruth C. Ellis (1899–2000), the oldest known lesbian activist in the United States. The movie, "Living with Pride: Ruth C. Ellis @ 100," won several honors, including Best Documentary awards at the Austin and San Francisco film festivals.

== Notable contributors ==
Venus featured a diverse roster of writers, editors, designers, interview and profile subjects who represented all sexualities.

- Gaye Adegbalola
- Eric Bannister, graphic designer
- Alaric Wendell Blair (The End of Innocence)
- Michael Boatman (Spin City)
- Andre Bolla
- Geanie Bond, contributor
- Jeannetta M. Bushey, RN
- Don Charles
- Gene Stephens Connolly
- Charlene Cothran, founder, publisher, and editor in chief
- Lee Daniels
- Martina Downey
- Cheryl Dunye (The Watermelon Woman)
- Charles Easley, photo editor
- Ruth Ellis (1899–2000)
- Marian Farrah, contributing writer
- Laurence Fishburne
- Frankie Fitzgerald
- Jacqueline Francis
- Brandi E. Frederick
- Egypt Freeman, contributing writer
- Steven Fullwood, health and fitness
- Jeff Gamble, photography
- Ife George, marathon runner
- Jewelle Gomez (The Gilda Stories)
- James Earl Hardy (B Boy Blues)
- Raymond Harvey, conductor
- Dorinda Henry
- Shirlene Holmes (1958–2023),
- Greg Hutchings
- Kamau Ifoma, spirituality
- Joy Isoke, contributor
- Leonard Jack Jr., PhD, MSc
- Nigel Jackson, entertainment
- Cary Alan Johnson
- Anderson Jones
- Bill T. Jones
- Richard Charlton-Parris Jones, contributing editor
- LaTanya Junior
- Eartha Kitt
- Anthony B. Knight Jr.
- Sharon Lane
- Steve Langley, books editor
- Maysa Leak
- Thonnia Lee, contributing writer
- PJ Lewis
- Audre Lorde
- Dale Madison
- Lovonia Mallory
- Marques McClary
- Quohnos Mitchell
- Ernest Montgomery, style editor
- Chanté Moore
- Ronald L. Moore
- Meli'sa Morgan
- Meshell Ndegeocello
- Ann Nesby
- Kym-Kisha Nixon
- Gretchen Palmer
- Tina Paul, photography
- Donna Payne-Hardy
- Lincoln Pettaway, books editor
- Michael Pleasants
- Patrik-Ian Polk (Noah's Arc)
- Gary Rice
- Sally Riedel, etiquette coach
- Gaylon Roberson, contributor
- Carla Robinson, corporate editor
- Alvan Quamina
- Derieck Scott
- Milton Simpson, contributing editor
- Craig Stevens-Taylor, contributing writer
- Sweet Baby J'ai
- Michael Taylor, photography
- Deborah Thurston
- Jill Tracey, entertainment editor
- Urvashi Vaid
- Stuart Van de Zee, contributing editor
- Steve Wakefield
- Craig Washington
- Shelton Watson
- LeRoy Whitfield
- Karen Williams, comedian
- DeAlan Wilson, photography
- Gloria Woods
- Shay Youngblood (Talking Bones)

== Publication dates ==
The following is a partial list of Venus issues available in archives, libraries, or personal collections.

- 1995: vol. 1, no. 1, January 1995 (cover: Life in this closet .. A Sister's Story; Phill Wilson, Grand Marshall King Parade: Paving the Way; Relationships: Back to the Basics); vol. 1, no. 2, February 1995; vol. 1, no. 3, March 1995; vol. 1, June 1995; vol. 1, July 1995; vol. 1, August/September 1995 (cover: "A Lady and A Woman"); vol. 1, October 1995 (cover: Two Women and Motorcycle); vol. 1, November 1995 (cover: Audrey Lorde); vol. 1, December 1995
- 1996: vol. 2, Feb/Mar 1996; vol. 2 May 1996; vol. 2, No 6; vol. 2, no. 7, July 1996; vol. 2, no. 8, August/September 1996; vol. 2, November 1996
- 1997: vol. 3, no. 1 (cover: Ann Nesby); vol. 3, no. 2 (cover: Michael Boatman)
- 1998: vol. 4, no. ? (cover: Lesbian wedding photo); vol. 4, no. 3 (cover: Black Gays in Corporate America)
- 1999: vol. 5, no. 2 (Ruth Ellis article); vol. 5, no. 3 (cover: Gretchen Palmer); vol. 5, Winter 1999
- 2000: vol. 6, No 1 (cover: LaTanya Junior)
- 2001: vol. 7, no. 5 (October/November)
- 2002: vol. 8, no. 1; vol. 8, no. 2 (March/April); vol. 8, no. 3 (May); vol. 8, no. 4; vol. 8, no. 5
- 2003: vol. 9
- 2004: vol. 10, no. 1; vol. 10, no. 2
- 2005: vol. 11, no. 1
- 2006: vol. 12, no. 2; vol. 12, no. 4

== See also ==
- African-American culture and sexual orientation
- List of LGBTQ periodicals
