= Craig G. Harris =

African-American HIV/AIDS activist

- Born: April 8, 1958; New York City, New York, U.S.
- Died: November 26, 1991 (aged 33)
- Organization(s): National Minority AIDS Council; Minority Task Force on AIDS; Gay Men's Health Crisis
- Known for: HIV/AIDS activism

Craig G. Harris (April 8, 1958 – November 26, 1991) was an African-American writer, poet, health educator, and HIV/AIDS activist.

== Life ==
Harris was born on April 8, 1958, in the South Bronx, New York. He studied English and Education at Vassar College, graduating in 1980.

Harris was HIV positive during his time as an activist. He was diagnosed with pulmonary Kaposi's sarcoma in January 1991 and died on November 26, 1991. He was 33 years old.

== Activism ==
Harris began his AIDS/HIV activism when he moved to Washington, D.C. in 1986. He worked with the National Coalition of Black Lesbian and Gays (NCBLG) to organize the first National Conference on AIDS in the Black Community at the D.C. convention center in July 1986. This conference included over 400 people from all over the country who wanted to discuss how to address the impact of the AIDS epidemic within the Black community.

In 1987, the American Public Health Association held their annual convention with, for the first time, a focus on HIV/AIDS. Despite the disproportionate impact of AIDS on the Black community, particularly on Black gay men, they did not involve any panelists of color. During the conference, Harris rushed onto the panel and took the microphone while shouting, "I will be heard." He announced the formation of the National Minority AIDS Council to address HIV/AIDS in communities of color where the government would not.

The National Minority AIDS Council was founded in 1987 by Harris and other activists, including Paul Kawata, Calu Lester, Don Edwards, Suki Ports, Timm Offutt, Norm Nickens, Carl Bean, Gilberto Gerald, Marie St.-Cyr, and Sandra McDonald.

Harris worked with the National Minority AIDS Council and the Spectrum AIDS Project in Washington, D.C. until 1988, when he moved to New York to work as the Executive-Director of the Minority Task Force on AIDS.

The last position that he held was with the Gay Men's Health Crisis (GMHC), an organization that still assists and advocates for gay men with HIV/AIDS, particularly gay Black men.

Harris' work involved sexual health education, with a focus on helping people of color.

== Writing ==
Harris was a prominent writer and journalist in the Black gay community of the 80s and 90s. His articles, and essays were published in places like the NCBLG's Black/Out magazine, The Advocate, Ebony, Gay Community News, New York Native, Outweek, and The Washington Blade.

Harris was involved in the "Other Countries" writers collective in New York.

=== Poetry and stories in anthologies (selected) ===
- In the Life: A Black Gay Anthology, Joseph Beam, 1986
- New Men New Minds: Breaking Male Tradition, Franklin Abbott, 1987
- Tongues Untied (Gay Verse), Dirg Aab-Richards, 1987
- The Road Before Us: 100 Gay Black Poets, Assotto Saint, 1991
- Brother to Brother: New Writings by Black Gay Men, Exxex Hemphill & Dorothy Beam, 1991
- Freedom in this Village: Twenty-Five Years of Black Gay Men's Writing, E. Lynn Harris, 2005
- Persistent Voices: Poetry by Writers Lost to AIDS, David Groff & Philip Clark, 2010

=== Other works (selected) ===
- I'm Going to Go Out Like a Fucking Meteor! (Biographical essay)
- Black, Gay, and Proud (article in VENUS magazine, 1997)
- Hope Against Hope (unfinished final volume of poetry)

== Legacy ==
The Craig G. Harris Papers, 1986-1993 is a collection of Harris' poetry, articles, speeches, essays, and personal documents hosted by the New York Public Library. In addition, recordings of Harris's memorial service after his death and recordings from his life are held by the New York Public Library Manuscripts and Archives. A photograph of his dedicated AIDS memorial quilt, along with several other photographs from his life, are also included in the collection.

On June 27, 2017, the Counter Narrative Project hosted several events in Atlanta, Oakland, and Washington, D.C. for their I Will Be Heard National Day of Action in honor of Craig G. Harris and to commemorate National HIV Testing Day, including a theatre production by the Brave Souls Collective in D.C.

== See also ==
- HIV/AIDS activism
- LGBT Movements in the United States
- National Minority AIDS Council
