= Freedom in This Village =

2004 book by E. Lynn Harris

Freedom in This Village: Twenty-Five Years of Black Gay Men's Writing, 1979 to the Present
- Author: E. Lynn Harris (editor)
- Language: English
- Subject: Black gay men
- Genre: Anthology
- Publisher: Carroll & Graf Publishers
- Publication date: Dec 2004
- Publication place: United States
- Pages: 225 pp.
- ISBN: 0-786-71387-9
- OCLC: 57028432

Freedom in This Village: Twenty-Five Years of Black Gay Men's Writing, 1979 to the Present is a 2004 anthology edited by E. Lynn Harris. The book charts the development of black gay male literature from 1979 to the present. The book won the Lambda Literary Award for the Anthologies category at the 2006 Lambda Literary Awards.

Numerous writings from black gay men are included, from authors such as James Baldwin, Samuel R. Delany, Reginald Shepherd, Daniel Garrett, Essex Hemphill, Melvin Dixon, Marlon Riggs, Gary Fisher, Carl Phillips, Robert Reid-Pharr, Keith Boykin, Thomas Glave, Marvin K. White and John Keene.

== Contents ==
- James Baldwin, "from Just Above My Head"
- Sidney Brinkley, "Passion"
- Salih Michael Fisher, "Assumption about the Harlem Brown Baby"
- Joseph Beam, "Brother to Brother: Words from the Heart"
- Samuel R. Delany, "from Flight from Nevèrÿon"
- Isaac Jackson, "Michael Stewart is Dead"
- Reginald Shepherd, "On Not Being White"
- Jerry Thompson, "19: A Poem About Kenny/Portrait of a Hard Rock"
- Gilberto Gerald, "The Trouble I've Seen"
- Daniel Garrett, "Other Countries: The Importance of Difference"
- Donald W. Woods, "Couch Poem"
- Vega, "Brothers Loving Brothers"
- David Frechette, "Non, Je Ne Regrette Rien"
- Essex Hemphill, "The Tomb of Sorrow"
- Melvin Dixon, "Aunt Ada Pieces a Quilt"
- Marvin K. White, "for colored boys who have considered s-curls when the hot comb was enuf"
- Craig G. Harris, "I'm Going Out Like a Fucking Meteor"
- Marlon Riggs, "Black Macho Revisited: Reflections of a SNAP! Queen"
- Don Charles, Comfort"
- Randall Kenan, "The Foundations of the Earth"
- Robert E. Penn, "Mike #2"
- Larry Duplechan, "from Captain Swing"
- Steven Corbin, "from Fragments that Remain"
- Cary Alan Johnson, "Post-Nuclear Slut"
- Darieck Scott, "This City of Men"
- Cyrus Cassells, "A Courtesy, a Trenchant Grace"
- Don Belton, "Where We Live: A Conversation with Essex Hemphill and Isaac Julien"
- Assotto Saint, "Vital Signs"
- Forrest Hamer, "A Boy Doesn't Know"
- G. Winston James, "Uprising"
- James Earl Hardy, "from 2nd Time Around"
- Cy K. Jones, "Fantasy"
- Gary Fisher, "Arabesque"
- Bil Wright, "Your Mother from Cleveland"
- Donald Keith Jackson, "The Letter"
- Robert Reid-Pharr, "Living as a Lesbian"
- Brian Keith Jackson, "How to Handle a Boy in Women's Shoes"
- Carl Phillips, "Minotaur"
- L. M. Ross, "from A Long and Liberating Moan"
- Tim'm T. West, "Magnetix"
- Keith Boykin, "from Beyond the Down Low: Sex, Lies and Denial in Black America"
- Thomas Glave, "The Death and Light of Brian Williamson"
- John Keene, "Palimpsest"
- James Hannaham, "Game"
- Randy Boyd, "from Walt Loves the Bearcat"
- Bruce Morrow, "Infidelity"
- E. Lynn Harris, "What I Did for Love"

== See also ==
- African-American culture and sexual orientation
