= All Glocks Down =

Single by Heather B.

from the album Takin' Mine
- B-side: "All Glocks Down"
- Released: April 2, 1995
- Recorded: 1994

Heather B. singles chronology
"All Glocks Down" (1995)	"If Headz Only Knew" (1996)

"All Glocks Down" is the first single released from Heather B.'s debut album, Takin' Mine. It was released in 1995 and produced by Boogie Down Productions member Kenny Parker. "All Glocks Down" was a moderate success, making it to 15 on the Hot Rap Singles chart, becoming the most successful of the three singles released from the album.

A music video for the single was released.

== Single track listing ==
=== A-Side ===
1. "All Glocks Down" (Radio Version)- 4:09
2. "All Glocks Down" ("An L To The Neck" Version)- 4:32

=== B-Side ===
1. "All Glocks Down" (Extended Mixshow Version)- 5:44
2. "All Glocks Down" (Fort Rowdy Mix)- 4:09
3. "All Glocks Down" (Instrumental)- 4:07
