= If Headz Only Knew =

Single by Heather B.

from the album Takin' Mine
- B-side: "No Doubt"
- Released: April 16, 1996
- Recorded: 1995
- Genre: Hip hop
- Length: 4:41
- Label: EMI
- Songwriter: Heather B. Gardner
- Producer: Kenny Parker

Heather B. singles chronology
| "All Glocks Down" (1995) | "If Headz Only Knew" (1996) | "My Kinda Nigga" (1996) |

"If Headz Only Knew" is the second single released from Heather B.'s debut album, Takin' Mine. It was released on April 16, 1996 and produced by Kenny Parker. The single was a moderate success, peaking at 20 on the Hot Rap Singles chart, becoming her second straight top-20 single on that chart.

== Single track listing ==
=== A-Side ===
1. "If Headz Only Knew" (Radio Version)- 4:39
2. "If Headz Only Knew" (Main Version)- 4:42

=== B-Side ===
1. "If Headz Only Knew" (Instrumental with Chorus Version)- 4:42
2. "No Doubt" (Radio Version)- 4:00
3. "No Doubt" (Main Version)- 4:06

== Charts ==
| Chart | Position |
|---|---|
| U.S. R&B / Hip-Hop | # 63 |
| Hot Rap Singles | # 20 |
| Hot Dance Music/Maxi-Singles Sales | # 20 |
