= Charlene Cothran =

American journalist

Charlene E. Cothran is an American journalist, publisher of the magazines Venus (named after her friend Venus Landin, who was killed by an ex-girlfriend in 1993) and Kitchen Table News (not to be confused with the feminist, activist publishing company Kitchen Table: Women of Color Press), and a former Lesbian and Gay rights activist.

== Career ==
Cothran launched the first edition of Venus in January 1995. The magazine was based in Atlanta, Georgia, and distributed to seventy-two locations across the United States and Europe.

Venus was tailored to the interests of LGBT people of African descent. The magazine was credited with breaking ground in several editorial areas, such as educational resources for HIV and AIDS prevention and care, dialogue between closeted and open LGBT populations, politics concerning homophobia, and the relationship between Christianity and homosexuality, among others.

Venus featured a roster of significant writers, contributors, and interview subjects, including Cheryl Dunye (The Watermelon Woman), Jewelle Gomez (The Gilda Stories), James Earl Hardy (B Boy Blues), Shirlene Holmes (1958-2023), Patrik-Ian Polk (Noah’s Arc), and Shay Youngblood (Talking Bones).

Following a religious conversion in 2006, Cothran changed the editorial policy of Venus, and began to promote what is popularly called the ex-gay movement through the magazine. Cothran's abrupt renunciation of her historical views in favor of evangelical proclamations led to a decline in advertising revenue. Following these events, Venus Magazine ceased operations in 2007.

== Personal life ==
Charlene Cothran is a former lesbian.

Today I am celibate. Again, I don’t say I will never have a man in my life, I’m not saying I will never be married to a man. Who knows what the Lord has in store for me. But there is one thing I can say and one thing I will go on record and say—I will never be entangled with the bondage of lesbianism again.

— April 2007 interview

Cothran established The Evidence Ministry, Inc., an evangelical mission that encourages people to renounce homosexuality.
