= Invisible Life =

1991 novel by E. Lynn Harris

- First edition
- Author: E. Lynn Harris
- Language: English
- Genre: Young adult novel
- Publisher: Consortium Press
- Publication date: 1991
- Publication place: United States
- Media type: Print (Paperback)
- Pages: 236 pp
- ISBN: 978-0-963-17910-4
- OCLC: 28255600
- Dewey Decimal: 813/.54 20
- LC Class: PS3558.A64438 I58 1994

Invisible Life is a novel by American author E. Lynn Harris self-published in 1991, before being taken up by Anchor Books in 1994. The plot follows an African American man's journey of sexual discovery, in which he realizes he is gay. In 2010, the Los Angeles Times listed the novel as one of the top 20 "classic works of gay literature" ever written.

== Plot ==
Raymond Winston Tyler Jr. is an African American lawyer in a white-dominated workplace. The story starts in the 1980s. A popular senior at the University of Alabama, Raymond is dating the only black cheerleader on campus, Sela. Things change when he meets star football player Kelvin Ellis. Kelvin reveals that he is bisexual and asks if Raymond is open to new things. Raymond retreats but soon finds himself in a forced kiss with Kelvin. They then have sex in his dorm room. Kelvin assures him that one time with a man won't make him gay. Raymond continues this relationship with Kelvin until Kelvin insist that he live a heterosexual life, and they part ways. After graduating with his undergraduate degree, he decides to pursue his grad years at Columbia University and parts ways with Sela.

Years in the future, Raymond is still in the closet, or living an invisible life, as he calls it. His life consist of his friends JJ (a former one-night stand) and Kyle, Raymond's openly gay best friend. Kyle and Raymond converse at gay bars and then meet up with JJ for dinner. Kyle picks up a man and also introduces a man whom Raymond finds attractive. They meet again and go to Raymond's house. The man reveals himself as Quinn Mathis. They begin to have a sexual and indoor relationship, until Raymond finds a wedding ring in his bed. Quinn reveals that he is married but at the point of divorce. Raymond, unsure, complies. During a regular visit to Kyle's apartment, he finds a muscular caressing him. Raymond is confused but knows he looks familiar. He goes home to watch ESPN to find that it is John Basil Henderson, football player for the Warriors. Quinn assures him that many athletes fool around. During Christmas shopping for Kyle and his family, he runs into Kelvin. Kelvin is not only married but is a football coach in another city. The wife, oblivious to how they know each other, suggests they should get together sometime. Raymond also makes a visit back to his hometown. His family who is aware of his sexuality (except his little brother Kirby) welcomes him. His mother does; his father is not as welcoming to have a gay son and distances himself. He also hears that his hth (hometown honey) Sela is getting married. He soon meets up with her and has dinner. They exchange stories and they have reminiscent sex and express that their love hasn't changed and part ways. Back in New York, Quinn and Raymond begin to have more public activities as they feel more comfortable, and in secret Raymond is falling for him. Raymond questions Kyle about Basil with no avail. he soon runs into Basil and they talk. Although very handsome in every way. He is found to be very homophobic and in his right mind considers himself straight. He also admits that the way Raymond presents himself (non gay looking) makes him attractive, along with his looks. He also tells Raymond that only Kyle should tell him why they were meeting. The Kelvin family agree to a dinner with Raymond and bring a guest, Miss Nicole Springer, a broadway singer in the making. Raymond finds himself very attracted to her. To even the extent of Quinn and him hanging out less. After a passionate night, Nicole and he make love. Raymond feels that he is only in love with a man's body not the man itself and that he can kill his gay behavior. At one point in the story, Kelvin and Raymond are alone. He insists that he marry Nicole so they can pursue a relationship, Raymond is appalled and storms off. Also, he gets in argument with his father on his sexuality and how he should be with Nicole. Soon it's revealed that Kelvin's wife is sick and has AIDS. Raymond is contemplating telling Nicole that he is abstaining from men and that they should get married. Nicole asks if Kelvin was a DL male to which Raymond refuses to answer and then comes clean to which scares Nicole off (thinking she might share kelvin's wife candace's fate). It is also revealed that Kelvin has run way and can't be contacted.

Raymond goes home drunk and is comforted by Quinn, whom he had already called off telling him to stay with his wife. He also reconciles with his father whom visits after he does not answer his calls. He tells him that he may not he happy with his gayness, but he loves him dearly. Kyle reveals later that Basil requested him from an escort service. Raymond and Nicole reconcile through a promise of an AIDS test. The story ends in a letter from the beginning of the story that never reveals who it is being sent to. It is revealed that it is to Nicole, speaking of the possibilities of a perfect world.

== Television series ==
In May 2021, it was reported that HBO was in developing a television adaptation of novels. It will be produced by Harrison David Rivers, Proteus Spann and Tracy Edmonds.
