= Minority AIDS Project =

Nonprofit HIV/AIDS organization in Los Angeles

- Abbreviation: MAP
- Formation: 1985; 41 years ago
- Founder: Archbishop Carl Bean, D.Min (1944-2021), Jewel Thais-Williams, and members of the Unity Fellowship of Christ Church
- Type: nonprofit organization
- Legal status: 501(c)(3)
- Headquarters: 5149 West Jefferson Boulevard, Los Angeles, California, U.S.
- Revenue: $1,350,201 (2023)
- Expenses: $1,467,178 (2023)
- Website: minorityaidsproject.org

Minority AIDS Project (MAP) of Los Angeles was established in 1985 by Archbishop Carl Bean, D.Min, Jewel Thais-Williams, and members of the Unity Fellowship of Christ Church. MAP is a 501(c)(3) nonprofit organization that offers free of charge HIV/AIDS education, medical treatment, and support services to all people, regardless of age, gender, race, or other circumstances. MAP is the first community-based HIV/AIDS organization established and managed by people of color in the United States.

== History ==
Black men and women are disproportionately impacted by HIV/AIDS in the United States. In 1985, African American and Latino men and women accounted for three times as many HIV/AIDS cases as white men and women. After reading about Carl Bean, a representative from the National Institute of Mental Health called Bean with an idea to start a group that would address the prevalence of HIV/AIDS in the Black community. Bean worked with “a core group of black women in L.A.” (including local business owner Jewel Thais-Williams), to establish the Minority AIDS Project (MAP) in 1985. MAP is recognized as one of nation's first organization to serve AIDS patients in the Black community.

Bean and members of the Unity Fellowship of Christ Church, including Gilberto “Gil” Gerald, who succeeded Bean as executive director of MAP in 1989, organized MAP to provide HIV/AIDS education, HIV testing, medical treatment, and social services for Los Angeles residents, particularly Blacks and Latinos in Central and South-Central Los Angeles. MAP is the first community-based HIV/AIDS organization established and managed by people of color in the United States. In collaboration with Congresswoman Maxine Waters (D-CA), MAP and Carl Bean were instrumental in increasing funding for the federal Minority AIDS Initiative from $156 million to more than $400 million in 2025.

In 1987, KTTV produced for a 30-second PSA for MAP. “AIDS HOTLINE" aired on the Fox Network station in Los Angeles. That same year, MAP defended court challenges and accusations of “promoting homosexual activity” to receive a AIDS education grant from the Los Angeles County Board of Supervisors to serve the county's Black and Latino communities.

In 1988, MAP and Dionne Warwick hosted a special concert event, “Coming Home for Friends,” that featured performances by Al Jarreau, Natalie Cole, Patti LaBelle, and others, and raised $150,000 for the AIDS organization. The following year, MAP and Warwick partnered to host “Coming Home for Friends 2,” that featured entertainment by Natalie Cole, Clifton Davis, Howard Hewett, Thelma Houston, Keith Pringle and other celebrities.

In 1989, MAP began its needle exchange program. That same year, Bean and MAP were featured in a BLK (magazine) cover story.

In 1992, MAP launched Youth Employment Services (YES), a four-year gang prevention program funded by the federal government and Ice Cube. That same year, the Social and Public Art Resource Center sponsored and commissioned a community mural by artist Mary-Linn Hughes in collaboration with Tammy Moritz, Reginald Larue Zachary, and others, that appears on MAP's Jefferson Boulevard headquarters. In September 1992, the Los Angeles City Council approved a $594,000 loan to MAP for the Carl Bean AIDS Care Center, a 25-bed hospice in the West Adams District of Los Angeles. The Bean Center served primarily Black and Latino AIDS patients; approximately of MAP's clients are Chicano or Latino.

In 2005, MAP and the House of Rodeo co-hosted the “Love Is A Message Ball,” to celebrate the Ball culture and to raise money and awareness for HIV/AIDS services in Los Angeles. That same year, the Carl Bean AIDS Care Center ceased operations. At the time, the center was the only AIDS hospice and 24-hour residential HIV/AIDS nursing care facility in Los Angeles.

In 2011, artist and producer Ice Cube designed a set of limited edition prints that were inspired by his classic rap songs and albums and donated a portion of the prints’ proceeds to MAP.

On World AIDS Day, December 1, 2022, the Foundation for The AIDS Monument (FAM) and MAP co-hosted STORIES Circle #6, a FAM produced series that allows participants to share their HIV/AIDS stories and to network with others in the HIV/AIDS community. Beatitude Bishop Zachary Jones, an early MAP volunteer and staff member, and then MAP CEO Russell Thornhill were the featured speakers.

In June 2024, MAP hosted STORIES Circle #12, and announced plans for FAM's construction of the STORIES: The AIDS Monument in West Hollywood.

== Programs ==
The Minority AIDS Project (MAP) provides free of charge programs and services to all people, regardless of race. More than 250,000 people have benefited from MAP's services. The organization maintains an annual operating budget of greater than one million dollars.

MAP's programs include Benefits Specialty Services; Bilingual Mental Health Services; access to a Community Food Pantry; Community Service Program; Free HIV Home Test Kits; Health Education Activities; HIV Counseling and Rapid Testing; In-Home Registered Nurse Case Management; PrEP (Pre-exposure prophylaxis for HIV prevention) and PEP (Post-exposure prophylaxis) Referrals and Resources; Linkage To Care (LTC) Case Management Services; MAP Anti-Violence Intervention Program; and a Mobile Medical Street Team (MMST), in partnership with Charles R. Drew University and Kedren Medical Community.

MAP's case managers and volunteers help clients to obtain public benefits, individual and group counseling, job leads and employment, rental and mortgage assistance, financial support, and other social services.

MAP has managed a home for AIDS patients called Dignity House.

== Funders ==
MAP has received financial support from the City of Los Angeles; Los Angeles County; State of California; and government agencies.

In addition to government assistance, MAP has received donations from the California Community Foundation; David Bohnett Foundation; Elizabeth Taylor AIDS Foundation; Johnny Carson Foundation; Kaiser Permanente; Magic Johnson; Mary J. Blige; Silicon Valley Community Foundation; The Robert Nelson Foundation, and others.

== Notable people ==
- Archbishop Carl Bean, D.Min (1944-2021), co-founder, and executive director (1985-1989)
- Jewel Thais-Williams, co-founder
