= Daniel Junge =

American documentary filmmaker

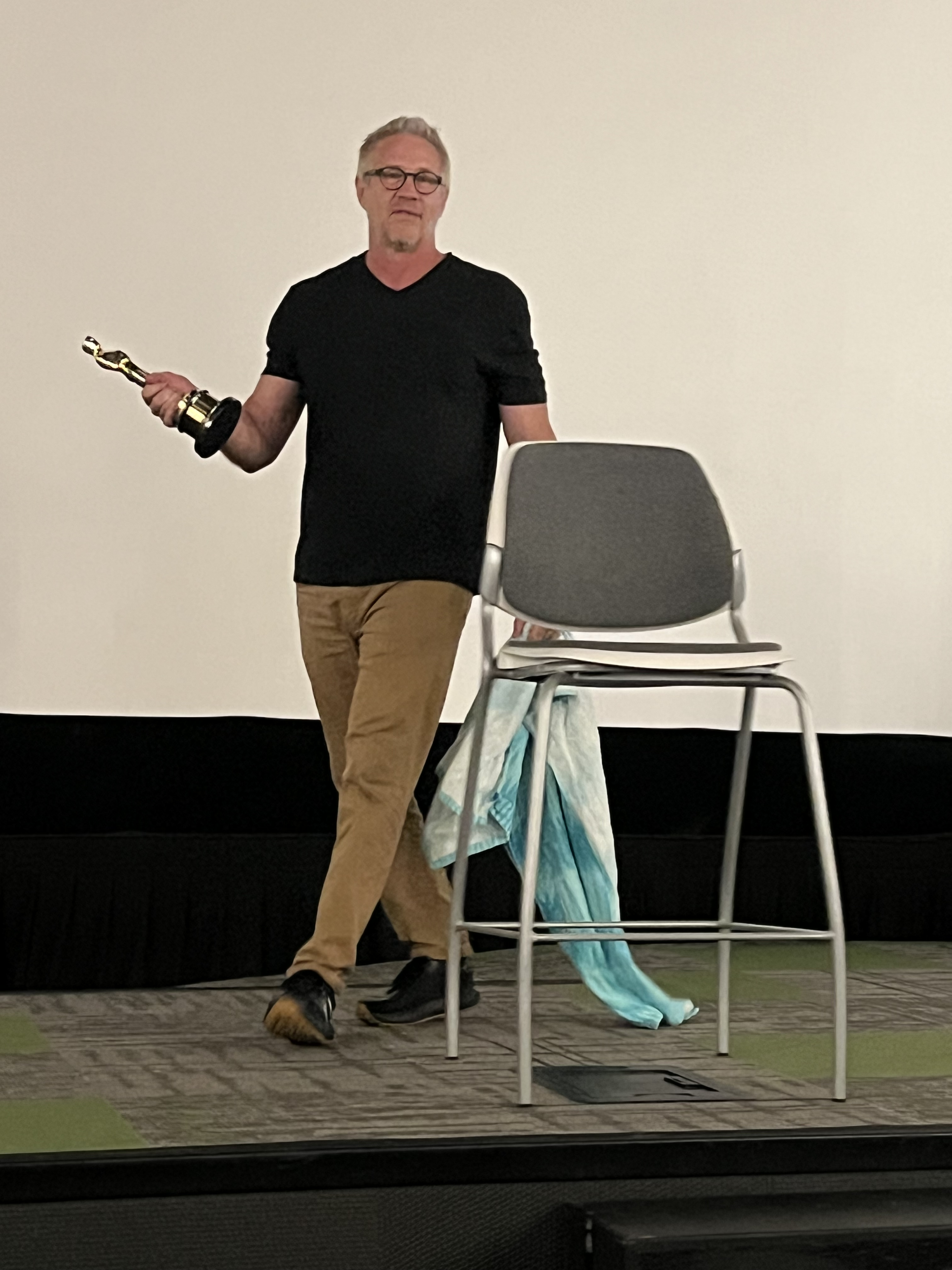
- Junge holding his Oscar in 2025
- Born: October 7, 1969 (age 56); Wyoming, United States
- Occupation: Film director

Daniel Junge (born October 7, 1969) is an American documentary filmmaker. On February 26, 2012, he won the Academy Award for Best Documentary (Short Subject) for the film Saving Face, which he co-directed along with Pakistani filmmaker Sharmeen Obaid-Chinoy. He lives in Los Angeles, CA.

== Life and career ==
Raised in Cheyenne, Wyoming, Junge is an alumnus of Cheyenne East High School and Colorado College and attended New York University's Tisch School of the Arts. Junge made his feature debut with Chiefs, a documentary about the Wyoming Indian High School basketball team. The film won the Grand Jury Award at the 2002 Tribeca Film Festival and broadcast on PBS's Independent lens. Junge was selected by Filmmaker Magazine as one of their "25 New Faces of Independent Film" in 2002.

Subsequent feature documentaries by Junge include Iron Ladies of Liberia] which premiered at the Toronto International Film Festival and aired on over 50 broadcasters as part of the "Why Democracy" series and They Killed Sister Dorothy which won both the Grand Jury Prize and the Audience Award at the SXSW Film Festival and broadcast on HBO. They Killed Sister Dorothy was also nominated for an Emmy for Best Long-Form Investigative Journalism.

In 2010, Junge received his first Academy Award nomination for Best Documentary, Short Subject for his film The Last Campaign of Governor Booth Gardner, about Washington’s former governor and his work on die with dignity legislation. It aired on HBO. His film Saving Face was also made for HBO and first aired on March 8, 2012. The film won the Academy Award for Best Documentary (Short Subject) and won the Emmy Award for Best Documentary Film of 2012.

In 2012, Junge became a member of The Academy of Motion Picture Arts and Sciences.

In 2014, Junge and Oscar-Nominated Director Kief Davidson co-directed A Lego Brickumentary with Jason Bateman as the narrator. The film premiered at the Tribeca Film Festival and distributed theatrically by Radius before airing globally on Netflix.

In 2015, Junge directed Being Evel, a documentary on the real story behind the myth of American icon Robert "Evel" Knievel and his legacy. The film features Johnny Knoxville, who also produced the film. The film premiered at the Sundance Film Festival, broadcast on The History Channel, and was nominated for an Emmy for Best Sports Documentary in 2016.

Junge also produced Liyana, a 2017 documentary following orphaned Swazi children as they create a narrative which is then brought to life using animation—and Hondros, on war photographer Chris Hondros.

In 2020, Junge served as Executive Producer and episode director on AMC's "Secret History of Comics." He also served as co-director and producer on the Netflix series Challenger: The Final Flight.

In 2021, Junge co-directed Season 2, Episode 2 of "Dogs", a documentary series celebrating the deep emotional bonds between people and their beloved four-legged best friends. Junge's episode centered around a former astronaut that hits the road with his Rhodesian ridgebacks on an emotional trip to honor his friends, the deceased crew of space shuttle Columbia.

In 2025, he released a documentary with Sam Pollard about Carl Bean, American LGBTQ+ and HIV/AIDS activist and singer called I Was Born This Way (2025). The documentary is named after Carl Bean's performance of the song I Was Born This Way (1975).
