= Stanley Bennett Clay =

American actor

- Born: March 18, 1950 (age 76); Chicago, Illinois, U.S.
- Occupations: Actor, writer, playwright, Film director
- Years active: 1969–2021
- Notable work: Ritual (play)
- Awards: NAACP Theater Awards

Stanley Bennett Clay (born March 18, 1950) is an American actor, writer, playwright, stage and film director, and producer based in Manhattan, New York. He is best known for his acting work in the films All the President's Men (1976), Minstrel Man (1977) and I, Robot (2004).

Though a lifelong actor, Stanley Bennett Clay has stated he prefers directing and producing: "I've always been the one in charge. I like the responsibility. At 12, I produced my first show: wrote it, composed the music, directed it, sold tickets, controlled the concessions—lemonade and cookies—and starred in it in my parents' living room. People from the neighborhood lined up to see it. Yeah, it's about control. I'm doing my own things, doing them the way I want them done."

== Career ==
Stanley received three NAACP Theater Awards for co-producing, writing, and directing the play Ritual, which he also adapted for film.

== Author ==
Stanley has written the novels Looker and In Search of Pretty Young Black Men, both published by Simon & Schuster and the novels Aching For It, Hollywood Flames and Madame Frankie published by Ellora's Cave.

== Tribute to E. Lynn Harris ==
Shortly after the sudden death of fellow author E. Lynn Harris, Stanley was contacted by the writer Terrance Dean, who felt compelled to write a tribute to the trailblazing Harris. Stanley agreed and, along with James Earl Hardy, penned Visible Lives: Three Stories In Tribute To E. Lynn Harris. Each story begins with the author reflecting on the impact E. Lynn Harris had on them as a writer.

== Private life ==
Clay was a long-time friend of actor Raymond St. Jacques and was one of the pall bearers at his funeral.
