= Don Belton =

African American author, editor and teacher

- Born: Donald Cornelius Belton; August 7, 1956; Philadelphia, PA.
- Died: December 27, 2009 (aged 53); Bloomington, Indiana
- Education: B.A. Bennington College, 1981; M.A. Hollins College, 1982
- Occupations: Author, professor
- Writing career
- Language: English

Donald Cornelius Belton (August 7, 1956 – December 27, 2009) was an openly gay African-American author, editor and teacher.

== Life ==
Don Belton was born on August 7, 1956, to Charles and Dora Belton in Philadelphia, Pennsylvania. Belton was raised by his grandmother in Newark, New Jersey. He received a scholarship to attend William Penn Charter School. While attending Bennington College Belton befriended James Baldwin, who encouraged him to write. He earned a B.A. from Bennington in 1981 and went on to receive an M.A. in creative writing from Hollins College in 1982. Belton worked as a reporter for Newsweek magazine.

In 1986 Belton's first novel, Almost Midnight was published by Beech Tree Books. Almost Midnight has been described as a "magical tale" chronicling the life of a preacher through the recollections of three women. W. Lawrence Hogue describes the novel as having been misunderstood by mainstream critics at the time of its publication and that Almost Midnight, like other novels Montgomery's Children by Richard H. Perry or Darryl Pinckney's High Cotton, did not fit the "aesthetic, political, and ideological criteria" of the canon of African American literature at the time. Critics have recently begun to consider Almost Midnight as a voodoo or hoodoo novel.

"Speak My Name cannot be understood unless we appreciate its historic contribution as an anthology of African-American male voices bearing witness to the enigma and promise of what it means to be a black man in the racialy charged miasma of North American society."

— G. Kasimu Baker-Fletcher, "Macho Deconstructed" CrossCurrents

Belton's anthology Speak My Name: Black Men on Masculinity and the American Dream was published by Beacon Press in 1995. Critics have called it "brilliant, bold" and "important" for celebrating black masculinity. In 2005 Belton's essay "Where We Live: A Conversation with Essex Hemphill and Isaac Julien" was anthologized in the Lambda Award-winning volume Freedom in This Village: Twenty-Five Years of Black Gay Men's Writing, 1979 to the Present.

Belton taught creative writing at Temple University, Shippensburg University, the University of Michigan, Macalester College, the University of Pennsylvania, and Indiana University, Bloomington. In the fall of 2009 he began a tenure track position at Indiana University.

On December 28, 2009, Belton was found dead in his home in Bloomington, Indiana. Ex-Marine Michael Griffin confessed to stabbing Belton and was convicted of murder in 2011. He was sentenced to 50 years in prison, which was reduced to 45 years on appeal. Shortly after Belton's death the website justicefordonbelton.com was established to commemorate Belton's life and work and as "a place to monitor the progress of the criminal case and the media coverage of this horrific act of violence against a member of our community." At the time of his death Belton was working on a second novel.

== Manuscripts and library ==
In 2010 Belton's manuscripts and ephemera, consisting of around 25,000 items, were acquired by the Lilly Library at Indiana University, Bloomington. This collection includes notebooks, correspondences with Chinua Achebe, Henry Louis Gates, Jr. and Jonathan Lethem, among others, as well as a preserved alligator head filed with flashcards, used as a teaching tool. Belton's personal library was acquired by the English Department at Indiana University, Indiana University Food Studies Department, as well as the Kinsey Institute Library.

== Awards ==
- Lila Wallace International Travel and Research Grant
- Bellagio/Rockefeller Foundation Fellowship
- MacDowell Artists Colony Fellowship
- Dance Advance/Pew Charitable Trust Grant for Dramaturgy

== Works ==
"The major themes of the work of African American writer and editor Don Belton include the gulf between real and represented masculinity, the impossibility of living without love, and home and the quest for sanctuary. His friendships with black gay writers James Baldwin, Melvin Dixon, Randall Kenan, Essex Hemphill and the filmmaker Marlon Riggs influenced the exploration of the potential of a range of caring relationships between men in his writing." – Emmanuel S. Nelson, Encyclopedia of Contemporary LGBTQ Literature of the United States

- Almost Midnight (1986)
- Speak My Name: Black Men on Masculinity and the American Dream (as editor, 1996)

Uncollected works

- "The Pentecostal Bridegroom", in Indiana Review 12.1. Winter 1988.
- "My Soul is a Witness", in Terry McMillan and John Edgar Wideman (eds), Breaking Ice: an Anthology of Contemporary African-American Fiction, New York: Viking, 1990.
- "Her Mother's Prayers on Fire" in Clarence Major (ed.), Calling the Wind: Twentieth-century African-american Short Stories, New York: HarperPerennial, 1993.
- "My Father's House", in Brian Bouldrey (ed.), Wrestling with the Angel: Faith and Religion In the Lives of Gay Men. Ed. New York: Riverhead Books, 1995.
- “Introduction", in Eve Kosofsky Sedgwick (ed.), Gary in Your Pocket: Stories and Notebooks of Gary Fisher, Durham: Duke University Press, 1996.
- “Voodoo for Charles", in Charles Johnson and John McCluskey, Jr. (eds), Black Men Speaking, Bloomington: Indiana University Press, 1997.
- "How to Make Love to a White Man", in Transition: An International Review, Volume 7.1 [Number 73] 1998, pp. 164–75.
