= National Coalition of Black Lesbians and Gays =

African American gay rights coalition

The National Coalition of Black Lesbians and Gays (formerly The National Coalition of Black Gays) was the United States' first national organization for African American and Third World gay rights.

While many Washington, D.C.-based gay rights organizations opposed the 1979 National March on Washington for Lesbian and Gay Rights, NCBG's support for the march smoothed the way for the event.

== History ==
=== Founding ===
In 1978, A. Billy S. Jones-Hennin, Darlene Garner, and Delores P. Berry organized the National Coalition of Black Gays (NCBG) in Columbia, Maryland, to provide a national advocacy forum for African American gay men and lesbians at a time when no other organization existed to express their views. The organizers, also including Louis Hughes, Gilberto Gerald, Rev. Renee McCoy, and John Gee, were motivated by a belief that existing gay and lesbian organizations did not represent the views and experiences of African Americans. In 1984, NCBG added Lesbian to its name in the 1980s to become the National Coalition of Black Lesbians and Gays. The organization's headquarters moved to Detroit, Michigan briefly in the mid-1980s.

=== Operation ===
NCBLG chapters existed in cities such as Philadelphia, New York, Norfolk, Minneapolis, New Orleans, Atlanta, Chicago, Portland, St. Louis, San Francisco, Washington D.C., Boston, Richmond, and others. The organization operated to highlight the concerns of the black LGBT community, provide previously nonexistent spaces for the community and its allies, and promote the artistic endeavors of its members, often coordinating social events and fundraisers to propel the collective forward.

=== Dissolution ===
NCBG added Lesbian to its name in 1984 to become the National Coalition of Black Lesbians and Gays, but by 1986, several key leaders left the organization, and eventually the group (without any official announcement) faded out of existence. By 1990, formal operations ended for the organization. As founding member A. Billy S. Jones described, "We just faded away. Some board members refused to acknowledge that it was time to say good-bye but folks just burned out and faded away."

== Advocacy ==
The organization was noted for its advocacy of LGBT parental rights, and Jones specifically organized groups to support gay and lesbian parents in Washington D.C. NCBLG was one of the first organizations to initiate HIV/AIDS prevention efforts in the black community, including pamphlets that used coded terms familiar in the black community with men who would never identify with the gay community. In addition, it sponsored two National Third World Lesbian and Gay Conferences and published a news magazine, Black/Out, which offered funding and support for the organization.

=== National Third World Lesbian and Gay Conference ===
The first National Third World Lesbian and Gay Conference took place in Washington D.C in 1979. The event took place in conjunction with the 1979 national March on Washington, and spurred more black LGBT people in the community to organize. The creation of Howard University's Lambda Student Alliance, the first openly LGBT organization at an HBCU, is one example of the event's influence. LGBT people of color from the United States, Mexico, Canada, and the Caribbean participated in the conference. It garnered more attendees than the second conference, held two years later in Chicago, although the 1981 conference was noted for its more diverse participants. The second conference's theme was "A United Rainbow of Strength".

=== Black/Out ===
Black/Out was a quarterly magazine first published by NCBLG in 1986 that offered funding and support for the organization. With Joseph Beam as its editor, the magazine considered itself to be "the voice of a new movement of Black Lesbians and Gays" and a "revolutionary publication" in the face of discrimination. It primarily focused on highlighting the erasure of black people from LGBT spaces, as well as offering discourse for race and sexual identity. The newsletter Habari-Habari predicated Black/Out as a bimonthly publication beginning in 1980.

== Notable members ==
- Michelle Parkerson
- Joseph F. Beam
- Audre Lorde
- Barbara Smith
- Essex Hemphill
- Gilberto Gerald
- Craig G. Harris
- Achebe Betty Powell

== See also ==
- African-American culture and sexual orientation
- Salsa Soul Sisters
