= I Was Born This Way =

1975 song

"I Was Born This Way" is a disco song written by Chris Spierer and Bunny Jones. The song was first recorded by Valentino in 1975, then by Carl Bean in 1977, and both artists released it through Motown Records.

The record was first released on the Motown-distributed Gaiee Records, and performed by Valentino (real name "Charles Harris"). Frankie Crocker of WBLS in New York first aired the song and it was an instant hit. For over 50 years since it was written, it has become an anthem for the gay community and has been on countless compilation albums as well as being (sampled) on other recordings many times.

== Background ==
The writers, Spierer and Jones, wanted to write a gay anthem and make the plight on gay issues known and bring it to the forefront.

The song's lyrics are about a man who proclaims that he's a homosexual and that he was "born this way". It was one of the first gay disco songs written specifically for the gay community, before the Village People wave.

== Success of each version ==
Valentino's version was a success in U.K. (where it was a #1 disco hit) and in the U.S.A.

In 1978, the Carl Bean version on Motown Records became a club hit on the Billboard National Disco Action, Top 40 chart, peaking at #15. The song was remixed by Shep Pettibone and Bruce Forest in 1986, and, along with a mix by Timmy Regisford, was re-released on Next Plateau Records. The "Better Days" mix became a huge club anthem during the 1980s. The song was also remixed again in 1995, for Next Plateau Records.

== Other recordings ==
- In 2005, the Pet Shop Boys' included it on their 20th anniversary album Back to Mine. West End Records released a CD mixed by DJ Gomi which included six versions of the song as well as a two-part 12" Vinyl Edition.
- In 2008, Magnus Carlsson, Sweden's popular gay male vocalist, re-recorded three versions of "I Was Born This Way" in addition to Paul Oskar of Iceland. Magnus Carlsson can be seen performing "I Was Born This Way" on YouTube as well as Marty Thomas of the hit Broadway musical Wicked.
- Two versions of "I Was Born This Way" (Bean's, and a newer recording by Jimmy Somerville) were featured in the 2006 independent film Another Gay Movie. Bean went on to entitle his autobiography I Was Born This Way (2010).

== Influence and samples ==
- In 2011, shortly after the release of the album Born This Way, the American singer and songwriter Lady Gaga revealed in an interview with radio show host Howard Stern that the album title, as well as the title track, were inspired by Carl Bean's earlier use of the expression.
- Producer Pal Joey using the alias Earth People sampled Born This Way on the track "Dance"
- It was also sampled in 1999 by Adam Blake and Stuart Price, using the alias Pour Homme, as "Born this Way". It was a tremendous hit in Europe.

== Documentary ==
In 2025, a documentary of the same name, I Was Born This Way, debuted at the Tribeca Film Festival. Directed by Daniel Junge and Sam Pollard, it spotlighted Carl Bean, as well as the history of the song and other people involved its creation and appreciation.

== See also ==
- Carl Bean
- Gay anthem
