= B-Boy Blues =

Drama film by Jussie Smollett

- Directed by: Jussie Smollett
- Written by: Jussie Smollett
- Based on: B-Boy Blues by James Earl Hardy
- Produced by: Jussie Smollett; Madia Hill Scott
- Starring: Timothy Richardson; Thomas Mackie; Landon G. Woodson; Brandee Evans; Michael Jackson Jr.; Marquise Vilson; Jabari Redd; Brian Lucas; Heather B.; Broderick Hunter; Ledisi
- Cinematography: Joe 'Jody' Williams
- Edited by: Jake Smollett
- Music by: Shajuan Andrews
- Production companies: Winnienoah Productions; A SuperMassive Movie
- Distributed by: BET+
- Release date: November 3, 2021; (American Black Film Festival)
- Running time: 103 minutes
- Country: United States
- Language: English

B-Boy Blues is a 2021 American comedy-drama film written and directed by Jussie Smollett (in his feature directorial debut) and based on James Earl Hardy's (who also co-wrote the script) 1994 book about the black LGBTQ+ community in New York. The film stars Timothy Richardson and Thomas Mackie, with Landon G. Woodson, Brandee Evans, Michael Jackson Jr., Marquise Vilson, Jabari Redd, Brian Lucas, Heather B., Broderick Hunter and Ledisi. It follows the relationship between Mitchell Crawford (Richardson), a 27-year old journalist, and Raheim Rivers (Mackie), a 24-year old bicycle messenger and Banjee.

The film was premiered at the 2021 American Black Film Festival on November 3, 2021, receiving nominations for Best Narrative Feature and Best Director, as well won Fan Favorite Narrative Feature Award. B-Boy Blues was released by BET+ on June 9, 2022. At the 34th GLAAD Media Awards it received nomination for Outstanding Film – Streaming or TV.

== Cast ==
- Timothy Richardson as Mitchell Crawford
- Thomas Mackie as Raheim Rivers
- Landon G. Woodson as Gene
- Brandee Evans as Michi
- Michael Jackson Jr. as B.D.
- Marquise Vilson as Babyface
- Jabari Redd as D.C.
- Brian Lucas as Angel
- Heather B. as Aunt Ruth
- Broderick Hunter as Adam
- Ledisi as Ann Walker
- Eric R. Williams as Gordon
- Otis Winston
- Tiesha Thomas as Anderson
- Jahleel Kamara as Junior
- Andre Virgo as Alvin
- Bry’Nt Bailey as Kareem
- Ilara Phoenix Williams as Angelica
- Sampson McCormick as Telly
