= Uriah Bell =

American poet

Uriah Bell (born December 28, 1978) is a poet, writer, publisher and founder of Rising Voices Press, and most recently, the editor in chief of TRUTH Magazine, a bi-monthly national publication for LGBTQ persons of color.

== Career ==
Bell began formally publishing his writing in 2008 with his freshman collection of poetry Mood Swings - where he decided to expose his personal self in an intimate collection. Although Bell intended Mood Swings to be his only publication, he was encouraged to continue sharing his story, and the stories of others through Mood Swings overwhelming response. In 2009, Bell founded Rising Voices Press, an independent publishing company focused on promoting and publishing the written voices of the Black LGBT community.

In 2010, Bell released his second collection of poetry Epiphany: Poems in the Key of Love (Rising Voices Press), a collection that explores the various platforms of love such as communal love between one and their community circles including the church, intimate love between two individuals and lastly self-love.

In 2011, Bell released his third collection of poems entitled Mood Swings: poems and other rants under Rising Voices Press.

== Activism ==
An activist in the struggle around HIV/AIDS, Bell is a 2011 fellow in the Black AIDS Institute's AAHU Community Mobilization College, a dedicated group working to develop mobilization campaigns to rally the Black community around ending and educating themselves on the disparities of HIV/AIDS and working to end the epidemic.

Bell has participated on national and international panels and has led discussions on HIV/AIDS in the Black community, living with HIV/AIDS and overcoming new diagnosis, homophobia in the Black community, LGBTQ youth suicide, the Black church, and segregation in the LGBTQ community.

Bell has held the position of chairman of the board of the Hispanic Black Gay Coalition, and sits on the board of directors for Fire and Ink, a non-profit for LGBTQ writers of African descent, and Shades of Pride / Triangle Black Pride in Raleigh, NC.

== Publications ==
In 2012, Rising Voices Press announced TRUTH Magazine published by Rising Voices Press, a national bi-monthly publication for and by LGBTQ people of color. Truth Magazine will focus on the needs of the gay and lesbian community of color via regular content on spirituality, men's and women's health, politics, social activism, wellness, travel, fashion, arts and entertainment and other issues affecting the community. Besides chief publisher, Bell serves as editor-in-chief of Truth Magazine.
