= Yolo Akili =

American activist and writer (born 1981)

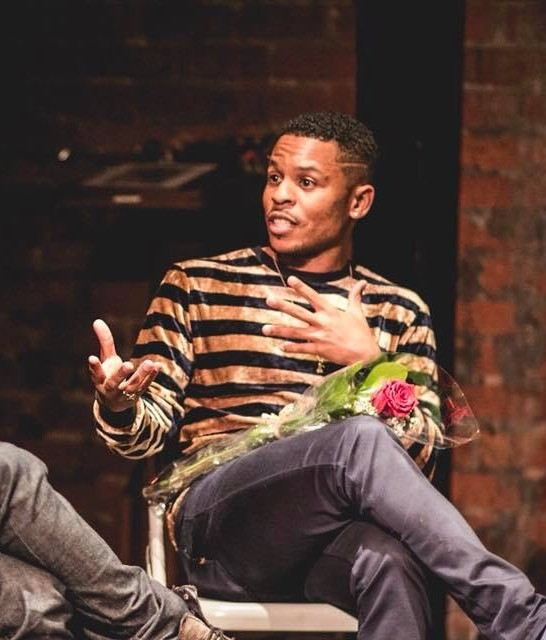
- Akili in 2016
- Born: Michael Todd Robinson Jr; October 14, 1981 (age 44)
- Other name: Yolo Akili Robinson
- Education: Georgia State University
- Occupations: Activist; writer; poet; counselor; community organizer

Michael Todd Robinson Jr. (born October 14, 1981), better known as Yolo Akili, is an American activist, writer, poet, counselor, and community organizer who advocates for addressing mental and emotional health needs in the Black community. He is the author of Dear Universe: Letters of Affirmation and Empowerment, and the founder and executive director of BEAM (Black Emotional and Mental Health Collective).

== Early career ==
After graduating from Georgia State University with a degree in Women's and African American Studies, Akili. After graduating, he adopted the name Yolo Akili. In the years following graduation, he worked as a counselor, yoga instructor and poet. During this period he released a spoken word album of poetic meditations ruminating on sexual identity called Purple Galaxy.

Moving into work as a community organizer, Akili joined AID Atlanta's HIV prevention team and served as a life support counselor at National AIDS & Education Services to Minorities (NAESM). Collaborating with Charles Stephens, Akili co-founded Sweet Tea: Southern Queer Men's Collective, a group of queer pro-feminist dedicated to combating sexism. As the regional training coordinator of Men Stopping Violence (MSV), Akili developed batterer intervention programs geared towards educating heterosexual African American men in their 40s about abetting violence and sexism against women.

In conjunction with this work, Akili began to focus on disentangling victims of violence from abusive patterns. Writing for Shondaland, Akili detailed his own struggle with overcoming domestic violence, the shame that afflicts members of the LBGTQ+ community who feel trapped in abusive relationships, and the need for victims of trauma to avoid normalizing destructive behaviour. During his time as a counselor, Akili saw that there were institutional barriers in place throughout the country that were preventing members of the Black community from engaging with their emotional healthcare needs, particularly after witnessing an HIV-testing counselor fail to connect a patient with care while working in Atlanta.

== BEAM ==
Seeking to address the disconnect between mental healthcare access in the Black community, and fed up with the failure of HIV/AIDS and domestic violence organizations to recognize the intersection between emotional trauma, recovery, and abuse, Akili founded BEAM, "Black Emotional and Mental Health Collective". Named in honor of Joseph Beam, the cultural and political activist who inspired Akili to reflect on his personal vulnerability as a Black gay man, BEAM works with a collection of artists, healers, advocates, legal professionals, activists, and religious leaders to provide mental and emotional healthcare to the historically marginalized and medically mistreated Black community. Akili has stated that BEAM's goal is to "remove the barriers Black people experience getting access to mental health care and healing". He has also cited the lack of emotional health support from licensed professionals as inspiration for training people in Black communities—from grocery clerks to aunties to barbers—to provide help where none would otherwise exist.

Through BEAM, Akili sponsors community engagement events that teach Black people how to recognize their emotional needs, develop self-care practices, and pinpoint specific organizations that offer help when trauma becomes unbearable. He also delivers grants to mental healthcare groups across the nation that engage with traditionally neglected communities. BEAM's outreach events have featured panels of notable mental health experts and activist including Jenifer Lewis, Raquel Willis, Patrisse Cullors, Vanessa Baden, Dr. Consuela Ward, Dr. Moya Bailley, Tre'Vell Andeson, James Bland, Nathan Hale Williams, Grant Emerson Harvey, Darryl Stephens, and Aaryn Lang.

== Other work ==
=== Advocacy and writing ===
Akili is an advocate for feminism, denouncing misogyny throughout the gay community, rejecting the agency that some gay men feel to fondle women's bodies, recognizing the need for therapy and addressing one's emotional well-being in the Black community (as opposed to self medicating or pushing through), embracing the "permission to get better: 'Healing is our birthright', and overcoming the vestiges of HIV/AIDS panic and trauma from the medical industrial complex in the Black community.

In 2015, Akili helped lead the Children's Hospital of Los Angeles' study into improving HIV treatment among young Black and Latino men (HYM). His writing has appeared in numerous publications including, TheBody.com, Essence, Everyday Feminism, The Atlanta Journal Constitution, Cassius, and Shondaland. As a contributor to HuffPost, he has challenged the power dynamics between sex roles in same-gender relationships, writing "...because a "bottom" still means weak, and "top" still means power — This is a call to become clearer to each other outside of checked boxes on Grindr or stats listed on Jacked", demanded that Black communities reject the narrative that "Black People are Deficient In Every Damn Thing and There are No 'Good' Black Men", and called for a "World Where Ending Partner Violence Was A Priority" in a "Black (Feminist) Future where Gendered socialization will be declared a public health emergency."

=== Media appearances ===
Akili has delivered keynotes, lectures, and led panels at National African American MSM Leadership Conference on HIV/AIDS and Other Health Disparities,Claremont McKenna College, AIDS United, Vanderbilt University, Ramapo College, Harvard University, University of Illinois Urbana-Champaign, Clayton State University, Baruch College, Agnes Scott College, Fordham University, Northern Illinois University, and Columbia University.

== Awards ==
Akili was awarded the Creative Leadership Award in 2009 by the Feminist Women's Health Center for his work promoting feminism. After releasing his book Dear Universe in 2013, Akili was recognized by BET as a "Health Hero" for his work addressing emotional health in the Black community. He appeared on NBC News in 2016 as a part of Jarrett Hill's Back to Reality podcast, to discuss popular culture in the Black community. He was recognized by Blavity as one of "28 Young Black Creators And Leaders Making History Today" in 2018. That same year, in recognition of his work promoting the intersection between mental health and social justice, he was nominated by AIDS United to the Robert Wood Johnson Foundation which awarded him its Health Equity Award. On the heels of this accolade, he was declared a "Health Equity Hero" by TheBody.com. In 2019 he was recognized by Essence Magazine as a part of their Black History Month coverage for his work "Aiding in The Resistance" in the Black LGBTQ+ community. On June 10, 2020, Jordan Peele announced that he was donating $1 million to five Black Lives Matter centered organizations through his production firm MonkeyPaw Productions, including Akili and BEAM which received $200K. That same month, Akili was celebrated for his work during BET's 2020 Music Awards, where it was announced that Well's Fargo Bank was rewarding Akili and BEAM $25K for their work.
