= Eternal Affairs =

Studio album by Heather B.
- Released: February 12, 2002
- Recorded: 2001
- Genre: Hip hop
- Length: 44:56
- Label: Sai Records
- Producer: Gordon Williams, Pete Rock, DJ Premier

Heather B. chronology
| Takin' Mine (1996) | Eternal Affairs (2002) |

Professional ratings
Review scores
| Source | Rating |
|---|---|
| Allmusic | 4/5 stars |

Eternal Affairs is the second album released by Heather B. It was released on February 12, 2002 through independent label Sai Records.

== Track listing ==
| No. | Title | Producer(s) | Length |
|---|---|---|---|
| 1. | "Live MC" | Luis "Sabor" Tineo, Gordon Williams (co.) | 4:45 |
| 2. | "Steady Rockin'" (featuring Twyla) | DJ Premier | 3:49 |
| 3. | "One Life" (featuring Horse) | Luis "Sabor" Tineo | 3:24 |
| 4. | "You Goin' Down" | Buddah, Shamello | 2:41 |
| 5. | "Gotta Love Me" | Buddah, Shamello | 3:42 |
| 6. | "Nobody Knows You" | Luis "Sabor" Tineo, Gordon Williams (co.) | 4:02 |
| 7. | "Eternal Affairs" | Gordon Williams | 1:46 |
| 8. | "What She Don't Know" | Luis "Sabor" Tineo, Gordon Williams (co.) | 4:44 |
| 9. | "I Will Never Change" | Chucky Madness, Prophecy (co.) | 4:19 |
| 10. | "More Than the Music" (featuring Nature) | Luis "Sabor" Tineo | 3:35 |
| 11. | "Dedicated" (featuring Pete Rock) | Pete Rock | 4:26 |
| 12. | "Young, Gifted & Black" | Ice Pirate, Gordon Williams (add.) | 3:43 |
