= E. Lynn Harris =

American novelist

- Born: Everette Lynn Jeter; June 20, 1955; Flint, Michigan, U.S.
- Died: July 23, 2009 (aged 54); Los Angeles, California, U.S.
- Education: University of Arkansas
- Occupation: Author

E. Lynn Harris (born Everette Lynn Jeter; June 20, 1955 – July 23, 2009) was an American author. Openly gay, he was best known for his depictions of African-American men who were on the down-low and closeted. He authored ten consecutive books that made The New York Times Best Seller list, making him among the most successful African-American or gay authors of his era.

== Biography ==
Harris was one of the first African-American students at Forest Heights Junior High and Hall High School in Little Rock. Harris had homes in Houston, Texas; Atlanta, Georgia; and Fayetteville, Arkansas.

In his writings, Harris maintained a poignant motif, occasionally emotive, that incorporated vernacular and slang from popular culture. Harris became the first black male cheerleader as well as the first black yearbook editor while attending the University of Arkansas. After graduation, he became a computer salesman with IBM, AT&T, and Hewlett-Packard for 13 years living in Dallas, Washington, D.C., and Atlanta. In 1990, Harris attempted suicide during a dark phase of depression and heavy drinking but later found the will to live through his writing. Harris relieved himself of his salesman duties and quit in order to begin writing his first novel.

In June 2019, Harris was one of the inaugural fifty American "pioneers, trailblazers, and heroes" inducted on the National LGBTQ Wall of Honor within the Stonewall National Monument (SNM) in New York City's Stonewall Inn. The SNM is the first U.S. national monument dedicated to LGBTQ rights and history, and the wall's unveiling was timed to take place during the 50th anniversary of the Stonewall riots.

== Death ==
Harris died on July 23, 2009, while in Los Angeles, California, for a business meeting. He was found unconscious at The Peninsula Beverly Hills, and was pronounced dead at Cedars-Sinai Medical Center in Los Angeles. According to the Office of the Los Angeles County Coroner, he died of heart disease complicated by hardening of the arteries and high blood pressure.

== Influence ==
A tribute anthology of stories called Visible Lives, by Terrance Dean, James Earl Hardy, and Stanley Bennett Clay, was published in 2010, inspired by Harris' novels.

== Bibliography ==
- Invisible Life (self-published 1991, mass-marketed 1994)
- Just As I Am (1995), winner of Blackboard's Novel of the Year Award
- And This Too Shall Pass (1997)
- If This World Were Mine (1998), winner of James Baldwin Award for Literary Excellence
- Abide With Me (1999)
- Not A Day Goes By (2000)
- "Money Can't Buy Me Love" (2000) (short story), in Got to Be Real – 4 Original Love Stories by Eric Jerome Dickey, Marcus Major, E. Lynn Harris and Colin Channer (2001)
- Any Way the Wind Blows (2002), winner of Blackboard's Novel of the Year Award*
- A Love of My Own (2003), winner of Blackboard's Novel of the Year Award
- What Becomes Of The Brokenhearted – A Memoir (2003)
- Freedom in This Village: Twenty-Five Years of Black Gay Men's Writing, 1979 to the Present (editor, 2005)
- I Say a Little Prayer (2006)
- Just Too Good To Be True (2008)
- Basketball Jones (2009)
- Mama Dearest (2009) (posthumously released)
- In My Father's House (2010) (posthumously released)
- No One in the World (2012) (posthumously released)
