= Ivy Joan Young =

American civil right activist

- A photo of Ivy Joan Young from 1990 taken by Dawn Lewis Photography
- Born: December 23, 1947; Washington, D.C.
- Died: April 24, 2023 (aged 75); Washington, D.C.
- Occupations: Journalist; activist; poet; photographer
- Years active: 1970s–c. 2015
- Known for: LGBTQ and civil and political rights activism in the United States

Ivy Joan Young (December 23, 1947 - April 24, 2023) was an African American lesbian journalist, activist, poet, and photographer who actively campaigned for improved LGBTQ and civil and political rights in the United States and beyond.

== Early life ==
Ivy Joan Young was born to Dorothy Elizabeth (Lewis) Young and Joseph Henry Young on December 23, 1947, in Washington, D.C.. She was the eldest of three children and graduated from Eastern High School in 1965.

== Career ==
Following her graduation from high school, Young moved to Chicago for a short time and worked at VISTA; she later moved back to Washington D.C. and worked at the Center for Black Education and Drum and Spear Book Store.

Her first venture into international activism was in 1970 when she traveled to Guyana as a part of the Guyana Co-Op Union in collaboration with African Society for Cultural Relations with Independent Africa (ASCRIA) where she farmed in Guyana's interior. To support international movements Young also traveled to Cuba in the 1970s with the Venceremos Brigade, participated in the 1974 Sixth Pan African Congress hosted in Tanzania, and the Southern Africa Support Project that stood against apartheid in that region, where she wrote for the Southern Africa News Collective. During this time she also worked at Astraea National Lesbian Action Foundation in New York.

Young's voice was her means of traversing life, she chronicled her experiences, passions, and loves through her writings, leaving behind a vibrant and substantial collection of poetry. Using her voice through her career in journalism, she was part of the Sophie's Parlor women's radio collective in the late 70's WPFW-FM Pacifica radio, where she interviewed Sweet Honey in the Rock (1977), and Alice Walker (1977) among other notable figures. She produced and reported news for WHUR-FM Howard University radio, and notably produced a short audio series in 1981 highlighting the experiences of Palestinian refugees in Lebanon and the Palestinian Diaspora as well as the events of the time conflict between Israel and Palestine and the factors that went into the experiences of Palestinian; and interviewed Hatem Ishaq Husseini and Yasser Arafat.

She also served as General Manager at WWOZ-FM jazz radio in New Orleans, LA, and as Public Affairs Director for WBAI-FM in NYC (1987).

Young was chosen as the Family Project Director, when the National Gay and Lesbian Task Force (NGLTF, now known as National LGBTQ Task Force) set in motion its first initiative in 1989 to secure rights for lesbian and gay people. While in this role, Young authored and published the first-ever Domestic Partners Manual. She also assisted by working and speaking at the Creating Change Conference throughout the 1990s. Much of her work in with the NGLTF is recorded in the Archival Collection of the National LGBTQ Task Force at Cornell University. During her time at NGLTF, Young spoke about how homophobia and racism manifests in the lives of LGBTQ+ people of color, as a multiply marginalized person on "Evening Exchange" on WHMM in 1990 with the host Kojo Nnamdi and fellow guest and activist Kevin Taylor and Jerrie Linder.

Young served as a U.S. delegate to the 1985 Third International Festival of New Song in Ecuador. She staffed both the Smithsonian Institution's Program in African American Culture, and the Center for Folklife and Cultural Heritage's Folklife Festival. Additionally, she served with the women's cultural production company that organized SisterFire concerts 1982–85 and the National Conference for Women in Radio. Young was administrator for Sweet Honey in the Rock (SHIR) 2001–2011, editor for the documentary, Gotta Make This Journey, wrote for SHIR's third album, Good News, and other SHIR initiatives.

== Filmography ==
- "6: It's a Wonderful In the Life". In The Life. Season 1. March 18, 1993 – via Internet Archive.: Guest/interviewee
- Evening Exchange: Interviewee
- Meanwhile (2024): Featured artist
- Again I Dream (in production): Featured archival subject

== Death and legacy ==
Young developed emphysema and spent the last three years of her life at home, dependent on oxygen. Some of this time was as part of a documentary film directed by her longtime close friend, Catherine Gund. Young died in 2023 and left behind an archival collection comprising papers, photographs, photo negatives, reel-to-reel audio, and video tapes.

Young's Archive was Acquired by Beinecke Rare Book and Manuscript Library at Yale in February of 2026, the Finding Aid is not yet available.

== Selected bibliography ==
- Bishop, Maurice (speaker); Young, Ivy (narrator). Grenada: the fall of the revolution. Pacifica Radio Archive – via Broadcast: KPFA (Radio station: Berkeley, Calif).
- Gund, Catherine (director) (2024). Meanwhile. Young, Ivy (featured artist).
- Haile, Mark (creator) (December 1990). All in the Family: Ivy Young works to secure recognition for lesbian and gay partners. BLK.
- "6: It's a Wonderful In the Life". In The Life. Season 1. March 18, 1993 – via Internet Archive.
- National LGBTQ Task Force records. Cornell University Library.
- Paredon Records. Archivo de Paredon Records. SOVA: Smithsonian Institution.
- Wax, Bill (producer); Berson, Ginny; Young, Ivy J. Women's equality, women's lives: Pacifica's live satellite coverage of N.O.W.'s Washington March. National Organization for Women, Pacifica Radio Archives.
- Young, Ivy (1981). E. Ethelbert Miller Papers. George Washington University.
- Young, Ivy (April 2021). "Interview with Ivy Young by Michelle Heleno" (Interview). Interviewed by Michelle Heleno.
- Young, Ivy. "Sweet Honey in the Rock Interview with Ivy Young and Jude Franco for 'A Woman's Story'". Pacifica Radio Archive (Interview). Interviewed by Jude Franco.
