= Black AIDS Institute =

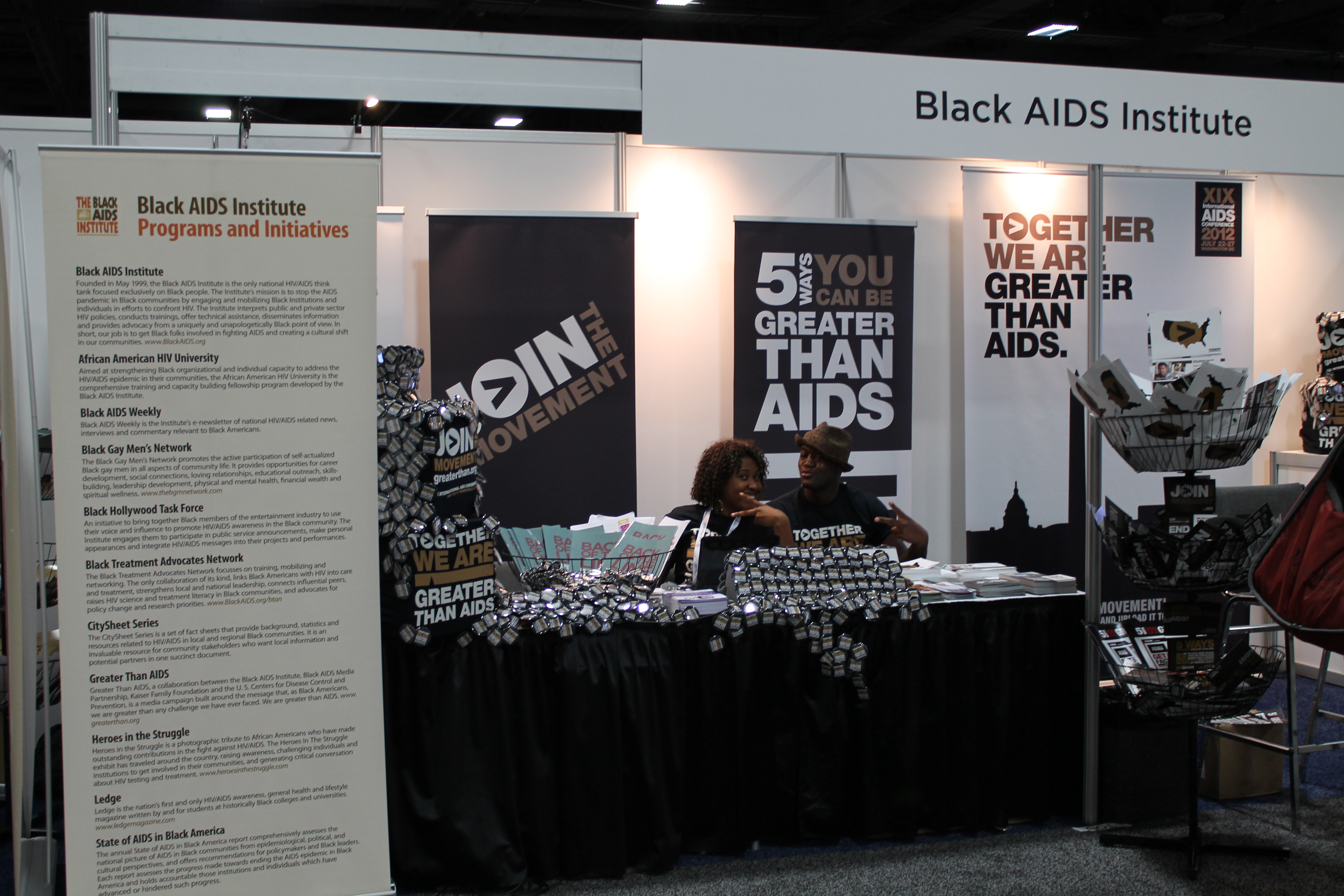
Black AIDS Institute booth at 2012 International AIDS Conference

The Black AIDS Institute (The Institute), formerly known as the African American AIDS Policy and Training Institute, is a non-profit charitable organization founded in 1999 by Phill Wilson to promote awareness and prevent the spread of HIV and AIDS by targeting African American communities. Their motto is "Our People, Our Problem, Our Solution." The Institute is very active in educating African American communities through their programs, like the Black Treatment Advocates Network and the African American HIV University. These two projects work with the communities to educate the people about the science of HIV, medical advancements, and prevention methods. The Institute has been received well through many other organizations providing funding to it. Some top funders include the Elton John AIDS Foundation, the Magic Johnson Foundation, Broadway Cares/Equity Fights AIDS and more.

== History ==
While white activists tended to target gay neighborhoods, Wilson decided to target the larger African-American community, since gay black men are "less likely to live in clusters and to seek gay services. In 1985, African-Americans accounted for a quarter of all new reported cases, and in 2001, they accounted for half. This is because black men are less likely to report that they have sex with other men. In a study done by the Centers for Disease Control in 2000, a quarter of black men who contracted HIV by having sex with another man considered themselves to be heterosexual, compared with 6% of white men. Wilson believes that AIDS is a black problem more than it is a gay problem. He has been cited as saying that he believes it is the black community's job to fight AIDS because "it is rarely possible for outsiders to come in and solve other peoples problems."

Wilson stepped down as President and CEO in 2019. He was replaced by Raniyah Copeland, who had joined the organization in 2008.

== Activities ==
=== Black Treatment Advocates Network ===
One of the projects done by the institute is the Black Treatment Advocates Network (BTAN). It was launched in 2010, in a partnership with Merck, and it seeks to educate people about the science of HIV and the advances in medicine in the way of treatment, as well as prevention methods. As of 2013, BTAN had trained more than 1,000 advocates to provide support for people living with HIV in 13 cities across the United States. These cities include Atlanta, Georgia; Baton Rouge, Louisiana; Chicago, Illinois; Ft. Lauderdale, Florida; Houston, Texas; Jackson, Mississippi; Los Angeles, California; New Orleans, Louisiana; Oakland, California; Philadelphia, Pennsylvania; San Francisco, California; and Washington, D.C.

=== African American HIV University ===
The institute has created a training program called the African American HIV University, which trains advocates who "work with churches, community centers, black businesses and the black media to influence policy, funding and research." This training is part of a two-year fellowship that includes a 30-day training with the AIDS Treatment College, as well as four internships completed in different cities around the country. Uriah Bell was a 2011 AAHU fellow.

== Funding ==
On their website, the Institute has listed Broadway Cares/Equity Fights AIDS, the Centers for Disease Control and Prevention, the Ford Foundation, Gilead Sciences, the Elton John AIDS Foundation, the MAC AIDS Fund, the Magic Johnson Foundation, the Janssen Research and Development, LLC, and the Bristol-Myers Squibb as some of their top funders.
