= Blackboard: African American Bestsellers =

Black Publishing Organization

BlackBoard: African American Bestsellers is an organization that promotes bestselling titles written by and about African Americans. The BlackBoard Bestsellers List was started in August 1991 by Faye Childs and Debbie Wade. The list appears monthly and is syndicated in newspapers. BlackBoard gathers bestseller information from African American bookstores. Each year, the organization announces a list of "Books of The Year," which features both fiction and nonfiction titles.

== History ==
After receiving rejections from literary agents for her own novel manuscript, told on some occasions "that there was no market for her story because African-Americans don't read," Faye Childs began the work of proving these agents wrong. She sought to "find out why so few African-American authors - other than Toni Morrison, Alice Walker and Alex Haley - ever appeared on the New York Times Bestseller List." After two years of research on the buying habits of Black readers, Childs founded BlackBoard with friend and business partner, Debbie Wade. BlackBoard aims to support Black writers, booksellers, and publishers, with the key mission to "stop the cyclical disappearance of books by or about people of African descent." Since the inception of BlackBoard in 1991, Childs has come to be recognized as an "[i]ndustry expert" on the publishing market of titles authored by Black writers.

As a newspaper-syndicated list, BlackBoard has appeared in numerous newspapers and magazines, and is regularly featured by Essence magazine and the American Booksellers Association (ABA). The ABA first ran the list in fall of 1991 in Bookselling This Week. Essence published the BlackBoard Bestsellers List regularly from 1992 to 2000, after which the magazine published its own bestsellers list. In 2001, at BookExpo America, Childs launched "the new incarnation" of the Bestsellers List in the form of "a four-page, biweekly standalone news publication," the BlackBoard Biweekly.

== Methodology ==
BlackBoard determines their bestsellers list by collecting data from Black booksellers and, more recently, public polling. With these data, BlackBoard generates a list of the top ten fiction and top ten nonfiction bestselling titles. Bestsellers are also delineated between hardcover and paperback publication.

Since the List's inception in 1991, technological advancements have allowed BlackBoard to utilize social media networks and online platforms for gathering the poll data used to generate the bestseller lists. In addition to a targeted email campaign, BlackBoard's website features a live, interactive "Best Seller Ballot" where visitors to the site can choose the ten titles they would like to see in BlackBoard's top 20. The ballot includes a mix of fiction and nonfiction titles.
