= Darlene Garner =

American activist (born 1948)

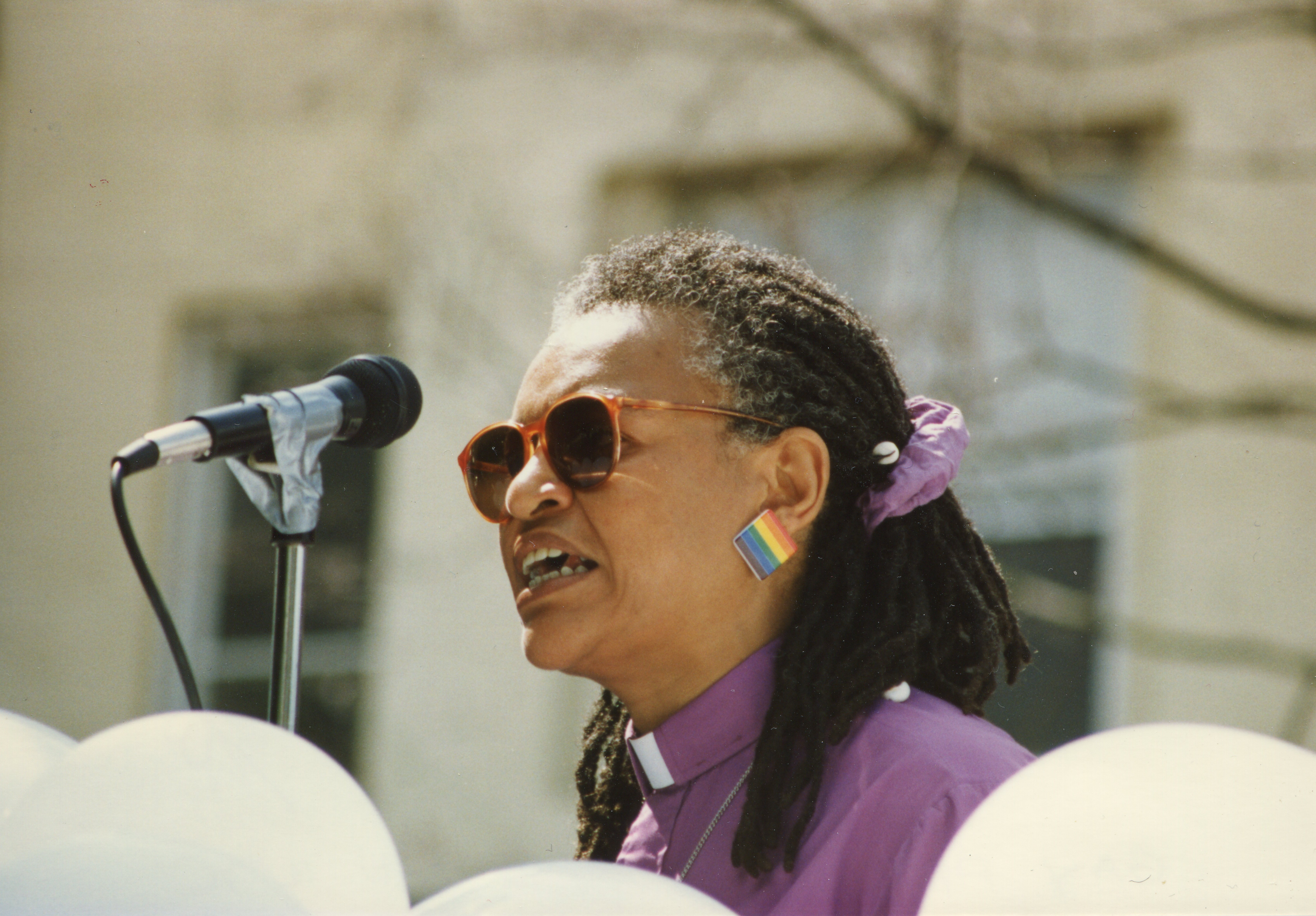
- Garner at the D.C. Gay Pride Parade, 1996.
- Born: September 28, 1948 (age 78); Columbus, Ohio
- Education: Ohio State University; Lancaster Theological Seminary
- Occupation: Minister
- Organization(s): National Coalition of Black Lesbians and Gays; Human Rights Campaign

Darlene Onita Garner (born September 28, 1948) is an American minister and LGBT activist, and a co-founder of the National Coalition of Black Lesbians and Gays (NCBLG). She was the first African-American elder in the Metropolitan Community Church (MCC) and she helped create (and now leads) the denomination's biannual Conference for People of African Descent (PAD). In 2008 and 2009, she served as MCC Vice-Moderator. She is a nationally recognized speaker on LGBTQ religious issues; for instance, she was invited to join several other nationally known speakers to announce the "American Prayer Hour", a gay-affirming alternative to the "National Prayer Breakfast". For her work in the LGBT community, Garner was credited in The African American Almanac as "contributing to the visible image of gays in society" and in 2010 was named a "Capital Pride Hero" by Capital Pride.

== Biography ==
=== Early life and religion ===
Garner is the oldest of five children. She is of African, Cherokee, and Irish descent. A native of Columbus, Ohio, Garner was brought up in the National Baptist Convention. She was baptized at age 7 at Union Grove Baptist Church in Columbus, Ohio. As a child, she attended public schools, was an active Girl Scout, and participated in the All-State Orchestra. Garner graduated from East High School in Columbus, Ohio in 1966.

Garner studied at the Ohio State University, Samaritan College, and Lancaster Theological Seminary. Having been raised in the Baptist church, she later attended the Episcopal Church and eventually joined the Metropolitan Community Church in 1976.

=== Personal life and sexuality ===
Garner married and had three children with her first husband. In 1973, she came out as a lesbian, at which point she relocated to Washington, D.C. with her three young children. She moved back to Ohio, married her second husband, and had her fourth child while identified as a lesbian.

On March 3, 2010, Garner and her partner, Rev. Lorilyn Holmes, were one of the first same-sex couples to apply for a marriage license in the District of Columbia. On March 9, 2010, Garner and Holmes were married along with two other couples at the Human Rights Campaign building. Garner and Holmes live in St. Petersburg, Florida with their dogs Joey and Micah.

== Career ==
From 1977 to 1980, Garner worked to help found the NCBLG, then known as the National Coalition of Black Gays (NCBG). She has described that experience as follows:

At that point in LGBT history, the needs and points of view of African Americans were not reflected in the agendas of other national organizations. We created the National Coalition of Black Gays and Lesbians (NCBGL, originally NCBG), organizing several chapters and transforming those chapters into a national organization. We knew that we were making history. What we were doing had the capacity to change the face of history. Our youth and naiveté helped us do it with a boldness. If we had been seasoned activists, we might not have taken it on. We know that if it was not us, there might be no one. So we took it on.

Before entering the professional ministry, Garner worked as the executive director of the Philadelphia Mayor's Commission on Sexual Minorities, beginning in 1987. She has served as the chaplain for an AIDS hospice and as President of the Board of Northern Virginia AIDS Ministry. Darlene has also served as a member of the Philadelphia Commission on Human Relations (hearing complaints of discrimination based on sexual orientation, race, gender, and national origin) and the West Hollywood Business License Commission.

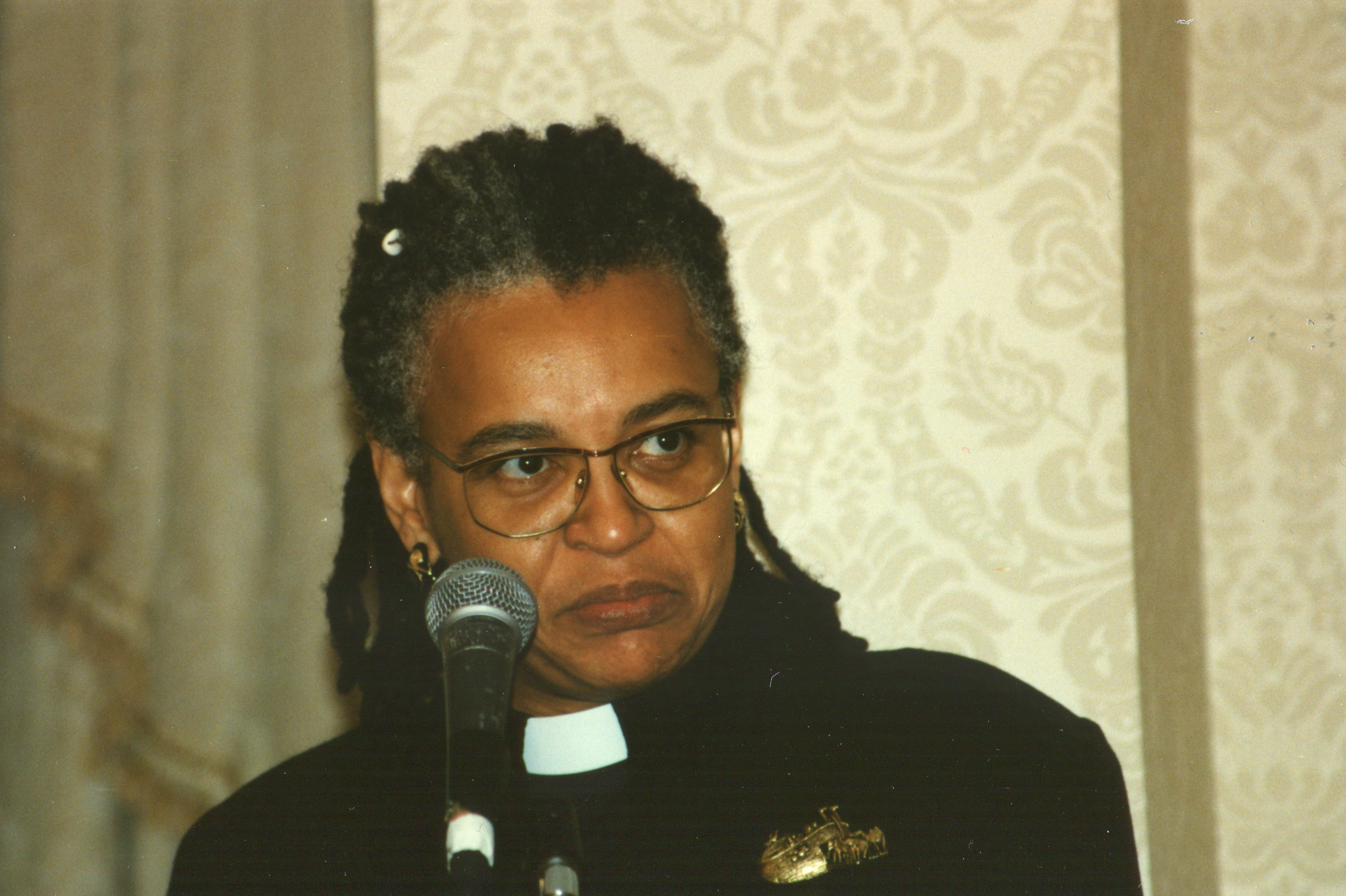
Garner at the Annual Black Lesbian & Gay Pride Prayer Breakfast in Washington, D.C., in 1996.

Garner was ordained in the Metropolitan Community Church in 1988. She has served as an associate pastor in the MCC in Philadelphia, Pennsylvania, and as an MCC pastor in Baltimore, MD, and northern Virginia from 1991 to 1998, during which time she was used as a source by U.S. News & World Report for stories on LGBTQ issues. Garner served MCCDC as Church Treasurer and Lay Delegate and later served MCC's former Mid-Atlantic District as assistant district coordinator. She now presides over MCC Region 6, which covers Latin America and southwestern United States.

Garner also sits on the Diversity & Inclusion Council and on the Religion Council of the Human Rights Campaign.
