= National Minority AIDS Council =

Non-profit organization in the USA

NMAC, formerly known as the National Minority AIDS Council, is a nonprofit organization that works for health equity and racial justice to end the HIV epidemic in America. The nonprofit organization, located in Washington, D.C. was founded in 1987. The organization changed its vision and mission in 2015 to reflect their efforts better. NMAC represents over 3,000 community and faith-based organizations across the US. The agency advances its mission by providing minority and minority-serving faith and community based organizations with capacity building assistance programs, online and classroom-based trainings, printed and electronic resources, grassroots organization and political advocacy. These activities improve the delivery of HIV/AIDS services, helping to mitigate the impact of HIV/AIDS in underserved and marginalized communities.

== History ==
Since AIDS symptoms were first described in June 1981 in the Morbidity and Mortality Weekly Report, AIDS has disproportionately affected minorities. A nurse named Joan Vileno, of Montifore, a health care facility in the Bronx, New York, recounted in Jane Gross' New York Times article, "The State of AIDS, 25 Years After the First, Quiet Mentions; The Nurse", that the majority of her patients in the early 1980s were drug users who were minority heterosexuals. Many delayed seeking medical care due to AIDS' close association with homosexuality. All of her patients died, many of them estranged from their families.

Leaders of prominent minority AIDS organization nationwide – including Paul Kawata, Calu Lester, Don Edwards, Timm Offutt, Norm Nickens, Craig Harris, Carl Bean, Gilberto Gerald, Suki Ports, Marie St.-Cyr and Sandra McDonald – started the National Minority AIDS Council (NMAC) in response to the American Public Health Association (APHA) decision to not invite anyone of color to participate on the panel of its first-ever AIDS workshop during the association's 1986 meeting. Harris, an African-American gay man living with AIDS, announced the formation of NMAC during that panel discussion after he rushed the stage while shouting, "I will be heard," and took the microphone away from Dr. Merv Silverman, then the San Francisco Health Commissioner.

NMAC then set about building awareness of the impact of HIV in communities of color. It met with US Surgeon General C. Everett Koop while he was writing his historic report about AIDS. Originally scheduled for just 15 minutes, Koop, who had not known about the disproportionate impact of HIV/AIDS among minorities, sat riveted by NMAC's representatives for nearly two and a half hours. The report would become the only publication, other than tax and census forms, to be mailed to every person in the United States.

The agency incorporated in 1987, and later launched the groundbreaking social marketing campaign, "Live Long Sugar," with Patti LaBelle, which alerted people of color living with HIV/AIDS about the dangers of the common HIV co-infection, Pneumocystis carnii pneumonia (PNP).

In 1989, NMAC partnered with the Centers for Disease Control and Prevention (CDC) to help build the capacity of small faith- and community-based organizations (F/CBOs) delivering HIV/AIDS services in communities of color. This changed the mission of the agency from raising awareness of the impact of HIV/AIDS among minorities, to building leadership within communities to address the challenges of HIV/AIDS.

Three decades after Vileno's writings, HIV still disproportionately impacts communities of color. African Americans and Latinos, who each represent 18% of the U.S. population, account for over 50% and 18% of all new HIV cases reported to the CDC each year, respectively. In 2008, according to the CDC, African-Americans accounted for 52% of all new HIV/AIDS infections. And AIDS is the leading cause of death among African American women aged 24–35. NMAC continues to work on minority communities' behalf with a community-based response of public policy education programs, conferences, treatment and research programs initiatives, trainings, and electronic and printed resource materials.

== Advocacy and public policy development ==
Through its Government Affairs and Communications division, NMAC promotes national, state and local HIV/AIDS, health and social policies; increases participation of people of color in policy debates and policy-making bodies; and mobilizes local grassroots advocacy efforts to bolster national, state and local policy, support programs and funding targeted to people of color.

== Sources of support ==
NMAC's work is sustained by cadres of dues-paying members and private donors. Dues-paying members receive regular updates on NMAC activities, programs and services. Members also are given preference for USCA conference scholarships and other awards.

Combined Federal Campaign (CFC) and United Way. Federal employees may support the "AIDS Programs of the National Minority AIDS Council" through the CFC, the annual fund-raising drive conducted in federal and military workplaces, from September 1 to December 15. NMAC's CFC Designation Code is 10557. Non-federal employees may give to NMAC through United Way, which is designated as #2504.

Federal grants. In addition, the organization receives nearly $5 million a year in grants from federal government agencies, such as the CDC, expressly for purposes of supporting the capacity-building efforts of community-based organizations.

== Outside partnerships ==
NMAC partners or consults with a number of HIV/AIDS coalitions. Here are a few examples:

National Minority HIV/AIDS Policy Partnership (NMAPP). This coalition, founded in February 2007, includes NMAC, the Asian American Justice Center, the NAACP, National Council of La Raza, the United Church of Christ, and several other organizations. The coalition members work together to develop and promote HIV/AIDS public policies that respond to the needs of communities of color in the local, state and national arenas.

The Minority AIDS Initiative. This is an initiative that the CDC launched in 1998 to enhance HIV/AIDS services within minority communities and to lower the disease's disproportionately high infection and death rates among ethnic minority populations. NMAC is one of the Minority AIDS Initiative's chief advisors.

National HIV Vaccine Research Education Initiative (NHVREI). Launched in 2001 by the National Institute of Allergy and Infectious Diseases, the NHVREI raises awareness among the U.S. public about HIV vaccine research. NMAC is one of five national NGOs that participate in NHVREI (it joined in March 2008) and promulgates marketing and outreach campaigns encouraging audiences to participate in trials, join community advisory boards, and donate funds to vaccine research projects.
