= Melvin Dixon =

American professor of literature, and an author, poet and translator (1950–1992)

- Born: May 29, 1950; Stamford, Connecticut, U.S.
- Died: October 26, 1992 (aged 42); Stamford, Connecticut, U.S.
- Education: Wesleyan University; Brown University
- Occupation: Academic
- Employer: Queens College
- Partner: Richard Horovitz

Melvin Dixon (May 29, 1950 – October 26, 1992) was an American Professor of Literature, and an author, poet and translator. He wrote about black gay men.

== Early life ==
Melvin Dixon was born on May 29, 1950, in Stamford, Connecticut. He earned a BA from Wesleyan University in 1971 and a PhD from Brown University in 1975.

== Career ==
Dixon was a professor of literature at Queens College from 1980 to 1992. He was the author of several books. In 1989, Trouble the Water won the Charles H. and N. Mildred Nilon Excellence in Minority Fiction Award. Vanishing Rooms won a Ferro-Grumley Award for LGBT Literature in 1992.

== Death ==
Dixon died of complications from AIDS, which he had been battling since 1989, in his hometown, one year after his partner Richard Horovitz.

== Bibliography ==
=== Collection of poems ===
- Change of Territory (1983)
- Love's Instruments (1995, posthumous)

Heartbeat

=== Textbooks ===
- Ride Out the Wilderness: Geography and Identity in Afro-American Literature (1987). ISBN 978-0-252-01414-7.

=== Novels ===
- Trouble the Water (1989)
- Vanishing Rooms (1990)

=== Collection of essays ===
- A Melvin Dixon Critical Reader (2010)
