= ABilly S. Jones-Hennin =

American activist (1942–2024)

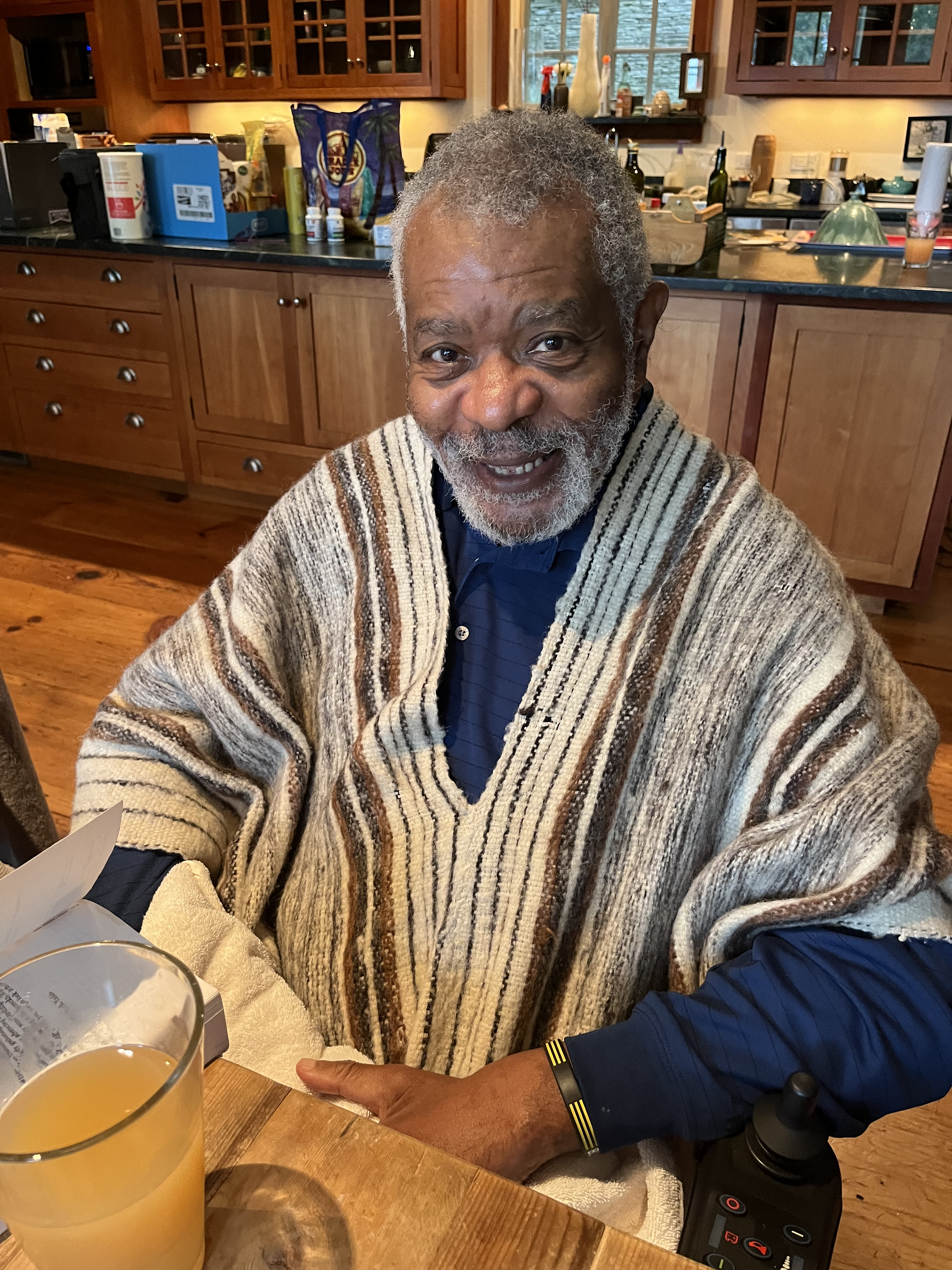
- Jones-Hennin in 2023
- Born: Lannie Bess; March 21, 1942; St. John's, British Leeward Islands
- Died: January 19, 2024 (aged 81); Chetumal, Quintana Roo, Mexico
- Other name: Allen Billy Scott Jones
- Education: Virginia State University; Howard University
- Spouse: Chris Hennin (2014–)
- Children: 3

ABilly S. Jones-Hennin (March 21, 1942 – January 19, 2024) was an American LGBT rights activist based in Washington, D.C.

Beginning in the late 1970s, Jones-Hennin was active in African-American LGBTQ organizing, helping to found a number of groups, and acted as the logistics coordinator for the first March on Washington for Lesbian and Gay Rights in 1979. In the 1980s, he was involved with HIV/AIDS education and helped to develop healthcare programs with the Whitman-Walker Clinic.

From the 1990s until his death, Jones-Hennin became involved with disability activism, speaking specifically about homophobia in healthcare settings.

== Early life and career ==
Jones was born Lannie Bess in St. John's, Antigua. He was adopted at age 3 by American civil rights activists and raised in Richmond, Virginia, with the name Allen Billy Scott Jones. He was raised alongside nine other adopted children in a home that his physician father turned into a "rehab and nursing center". As a teenager in the 1950s, he participated in lunch counter sit-ins, and, in 1963, he attended the March on Washington. After graduating from high school, he was briefly involved with the U.S. Marine Corps.

In college, he protested against the Vietnam War. In 1967, he graduated from Virginia State University with a degree in business and accounting. Later in life, he earned a master's degree in social work at Howard University. Jones-Hennin worked as a qualitative researcher.

== Activism ==
In 1978, Jones cofounded the National Coalition of Black Gays (NCBG) in Columbia, Maryland; the organization was the first national advocacy group of its kind for gay and lesbian African Americans. In 1979, he was the logistics coordinator for the first March on Washington for Lesbian and Gay Rights and helped organize the National Third World LGBT Conference at Howard University that same weekend. That same year, the NCBG organized the first delegation of gay people of color to meet with Presidential representatives, of which Jones was a member.

Jones also founded the Gay Married Men's Association (GAMMA), co-founded the D.C. chapter of Black and White Men Together, and founded the D.C. Coalition of Black Gays in April 1978. In the 1980s, Jones was a founding member of the Langston Hughes-Eleanor Roosevelt Democratic Club, an alternative to the Gertrude Stein Club.

Jones and his then-partner, Chris Hennin, worked with the Whitman-Walker Clinic during the HIV/AIDS crisis to develop healthcare programs, educate the public on the illness, and provide support to those diagnosed. In August 1989, he was made head of the Minority Aids Program in Washington D.C.

In the 1990s, Jones pivoted towards disability activism as he faced his own heath problems of spinal stenosis.

In spring 2007, the Rainbow History Project named Jones-Hennin a "Community Pioneer," RHP's most prestigious award. The RHP archives include a 1999 oral history interview with Jones, conducted by Genny Beemyn for their 2015 book "A Queer Capitol: A History of Gay Life in Washington, D.C." as well as a second 2004 interview.

In 2007, Jones was the chair of the DC Mayor's LGBT Advisory Committee.

Jones-Hennin remained involved with activism and local politics and spoke out about homophobia in healthcare in his later years.

== Personal life ==
Jones realized he was attracted to men early in his life and initially identified as gay, but chose to marry a woman on the advice of his father. He and his wife, who lived in Columbia, Maryland, had three children, but separated after seven years. He maintained joint custody of his children, who remained supportive of him throughout his life. After the separation, Jones moved to Washington D.C. in 1977; it was in D.C. that he began identifying as bisexual. By 2022, he also identified as queer. His parents remained supportive of him throughout his life, and after his father's death, Jones learned he had also been bisexual.

In the late 1970s, Jones met his partner and later husband Chris Hennin through the Gay Married Men's Association. The two married in 2014.

The A in Jones-Hennin's first name came from a godparent's initial; he chose to capitalize the first two letters of his name. Jones changed his surname to Jones-Hennin in 2008.

Jones-Hennin died due to complications from Parkinson's disease and spinal stenosis at his winter home in Chetumal, Mexico on January 19, 2024. He was 81.
