= Jewel Thais-Williams =

American businesswoman and activist (1939–2025)

- Born: May 9, 1939; Gary, Indiana, U.S.
- Died: July 7, 2025 (aged 86)
- Occupations: Activist, businesswoman
- Known for: Activism

Jewel Thais-Williams (May 9, 1939 – July 7, 2025) was an American businesswoman and LGBTQI+ activist based in Los Angeles, the original owner of the Catch One, then known as Jewel's Catch One, and the first black woman in the United States to own a LGBT nightclub.

== Early life ==
Originally from Arkansas, Thais-Williams' father, in search of employment and educational opportunities, moved their family to Gary, Indiana, where Thais-Williams was born on May 9, 1939. She was the fifth born of eight children. During World War II, several of her uncles and cousins were drafted into the navy and stationed in San Diego. These relatives sent back word of San Diego's excellent weather. Her family, wanting to leave Gary's harsh weather, relocated to San Diego. They lived with relatives for a short time before moving their large family into a one-bedroom residence.

Shortly after high school, Thais-Williams moved to Los Angeles and attended UCLA, eventually opening a clothing store alongside her sister. Despite having several intimate (though not explicitly sexual) encounters with other women, she did not realize that she was a lesbian until her mid-twenties. Her first date with a female was with a woman she worked with at a Safeway supermarket.

Having grown up black and in poverty, Thais-Williams felt that she would not be able to acquire personal wealth without starting her own business.

== Career ==
While clubbing in the early 1970s, Thais-Williams experienced discrimination in attempting to enter existing gay clubs, finding they would either refuse her entrance for being black and a woman or require two forms of identification to enter. In 1973, she purchased what was then the Diana Club on West Pico Blvd, opening it as Jewel's Catch One.

Soon after acquiring the club, white customers stopped patronizing the establishment, and employees quit, not wanting to work for a black woman. Despite these initial challenges, she was able to succeed. A man named "Tex", who Thais-Williams described affectionately as an old "redneck" from Texas, mentored her and helped her through the initial phases of setting up her business. Her bartender asked for his job back, and Thais-Williams obliged. Some white customers also returned and developed a strong relationship with her. Her club attracted mainly African American clientele, underserved by the nightclub industry at the time. The blue collar white clientele would visit the club by day, and the black community would be her primary customers at night.

== Advocacy ==
During the AIDS pandemic, Thais-Williams was an active advocate for people with HIV/AIDS, serving on the board of the AIDS Project LA and co-founding the Minority AIDS Project. She also co-founded Rue's House, a housing facility in the US for women with AIDS and their children.

While she was still the owner of the nightclub, Thais-Williams went back to school and got her Master of Science degree in Oriental Medicine from Samra University of Oriental Medicine in 1998. Due to the high rate of preventable diseases, such as diabetes and obesity, in minority populations, Thais-Williams opened a non-profit called the Village Health Foundation to educate lower-income communities on nutrition and live a healthier lifestyle.

== Legacy ==
To honor her contributions to the LGBT community, Thais-Williams was appointed the Grand Marshal of the 2016 Los Angeles Pride Festival.

In 2019, LA City Council President Herb Wesson renamed the intersection of Pico Boulevard and Norton Avenue—located directly in front of the Catch One disco—as Jewel Thais-Williams Square, in honor of her contributions and legacy.

== Death ==
Thais-Williams died on July 7, 2025, at the age of 86.
