= Joseph Beam =

American gay rights activist and writer (1954–1988)

Joseph F. Beam
- Born: December 30, 1954; Philadelphia, Pennsylvania, U.S.
- Died: December 27, 1988 (aged 33); Philadelphia, Pennsylvania, U.S.
- Resting place: West Laurel Hill Cemetery, Bala Cynwyd, Pennsylvania, U.S.
- Occupations: Writer; poet; activist

Joseph Fairchild Beam (December 30, 1954 – December 27, 1988) was an African-American gay rights activist, writer and poet. He was the editor of In the Life: a Black Gay Anthology, the first compendium of Black gay writing. He was a board member of the National Coalition of Black Lesbians and Gays and the founding editor of Black/Out magazine.

A second anthology, Brother to Brother: New Writings by Black Gay Men, was completed by Essex Hemphill and Beam's mother after his death in 1988 and was published in 1991.

== Early life and education ==
Beam was born in Philadelphia on December 30, 1954, to Sun Fairchild Beam, a security guard, and Dorothy Saunders Beam, a teacher and school guidance counselor. He was raised Catholic.

He attended parochial schools in the Philadelphia area including Malvern Preparatory School and St. Thomas More High School. Beam received a Bachelor of Arts degree from Franklin College in 1976 where he was an active member of the local Black Student Union. He helped to organize conferences on campus and was active in college journalism and radio programming. He was awarded the Omega Psi Phi Award for Broadcasting in 1974.

He remained in the Midwest after graduation and enrolled in a master's degree program in communications. He worked as a waiter in Ames, Iowa, and returned to Philadelphia in 1979.

== Career ==
In the early 1980s, Beam began working at Giovanni's Room, an independent gay and lesbian bookstore in Philadelphia while he wrote and was active in local and national efforts for acceptance, visibility, and social justice for the Black gay community. His writing was published in many newspapers and publications, including Au Courant, Black/Out, Blackheart, Changing Men, Gay Community News, Painted Bride Quarterly, Philadelphia Gay News, The Advocate, New York Native, The Body Politic, and Windy City Times.

Beam's short stories "Brother to Brother" and "No Cheek to Turn" were critically acclaimed. Beam had a large network of friends and correspondents which included Audre Lorde, Barbara Smith, Essex Hemphill, Daniel Garrett, Marlon Riggs, Sonia Sanchez, and Bayard Rustin. Beam also maintained ongoing correspondence with prisoners, which he later attributed to a "deep sense of my own imprisonment as a closeted Gay man and an oppressed Black man."

Through his writings, Beam aimed to alleviate the alienation of gay men of color, to help them create their own community, and to counteract the absence of positive images of them in the media and what he saw as their exclusion from the cultural world of white gay rights activists. Inspired by the humanism of the Black feminist and lesbian movement, he saw his work as part of a broad effort to "correct" and re-define the reality of race, sex, class, and gender in the United States.

The Lesbian and Gay Press Association awarded Beam a certificate for outstanding achievement by a minority journalist in 1984. In 1985, Beam became a consultant to the Gay and Lesbian Task Force of the American Friends Service Committee. In 1985, Beam joined the executive committee of the National Coalition of Black Lesbians and Gays, and became the editor of its journal, Black/Out. That same year, Beam was awarded the Philadelphia Gay News Lambda Award for Outstanding Achievement.

Beam was the editor of In the Life (1986), the first anthology of poetry and prose by Black gay men, for which he received a citation from the State House of Rhode Island in 1987 and a commendation from the City of Philadelphia. Beam began a second anthology, Brother to Brother, named after his earlier short story, but died before it was completed. Essex Hemphill and Beam's mother, Dorothy, completed the collection and it was published as Brother to Brother: New Writings by Black Gay Men in 1991.

== Death and legacy ==
Beam died of an AIDS-related illness on December 27, 1988. He was found dead on the floor of his apartment by friends and had been dead for several days. He was interred at West Laurel Hill Cemetery in Bala Cynwyd, Pennsylvania.

In 1992, Beam's mother donated her son's papers to the Schomburg Center for Research in Black Culture in New York. The donation led to the curation, by Steven G. Fullwood, of the center's In the Life archive dedicated to Black LGBTQ experiences. The correspondence includes letters to Black gay writers, including Audre Lorde, and also letters to people who were incarcerated, interviews with organizer Bayard Rustin and poet Pat Parker, as well as notes and manuscripts from Beam's journalism and gay rights work.

Yolo Akili founded BEAM (Black Emotional and Mental Health) in honor of Joseph Beam.

== Works ==
- In the Life: A Black Gay Anthology. Edited by Joseph F. Beam (Alyson Publications, 1986). ISBN 9780932870735
- Brother to Brother: New Writings by Black Gay Men. Edited by Essex Hemphill, conceived by Joseph Beam, project managed by Dorothy Beam (Alyson Publications, 1991). ISBN 9781555831462.
