= Takin' Mine =

Takin Mine

Studio album by Heather B.
- Released: June 11, 1996
- Recorded: 1994–95
- Studio: D&D (New York, NY); Giant (New York, NY)
- Genre: Hip hop
- Length: 40:44
- Label: Pendulum; EMI
- Producer: DJ Kenny Parker; Da Beatminerz

Heather B. chronology
Takin Mine (1996)	Eternal Affairs (2002)

Singles from Takin Mine
- 1. "All Glocks Down" Released: 1995; 2. "If Headz Only Knew" Released: April 16, 1996; 3. "My Kinda Nigga" Released: September 17, 1996

Takin Mine is the debut studio album by American rapper Heather B. It was released on June 11, 1996, through Pendulum/EMI America. The recording sessions took place at D&D Studios and Giant Recording Studios in New York. It was produced by Boogie Down Productions member DJ Kenny Parker, except for one song produced by Da Beatminerz. It features a guest appearance from M.O.P. The album was a minor success making it to No. 36 on the Top R&B/Hip-Hop Albums and No. 14 on the Top Heatseekers, and spawned three charting singles, "All Glocks Down", "If Headz Only Knew" and "My Kinda Nigga", each of which found decent success on the Hot Rap Singles chart.

== Critical reception ==
Professional ratings
Review scores
Source	Rating
AllMusic	3/5 stars
Entertainment Weekly	B+
RapReviews	7.5/10
The Source	3.5/5 stars

The Boston Herald labeled the album "solid but unexceptional" and "sassy and street smart."

== Track listing ==
No.	Title	Writer(s)	Producer(s)	Length
1.	"Da Heartbreaka"	Heather Gardner; Kenny Parker	DJ Kenny Parker	3:57
2.	"All Glocks Down"	Gardner; Parker; Thom Bell; Linda Creed; Ewart Dewgarde; Walter Dewgarde; Kenyatta Blake	DJ Kenny Parker	4:09
3.	"If Headz Only Knew..."	Gardner; Parker	DJ Kenny Parker	4:41
4.	"My Kinda Nigga" (featuring M.O.P.)	Gardner; Jamal Grinnage; Eric Murray; Parker	DJ Kenny Parker	4:18
5.	"Takin' Mine"	Gardner; Parker; Luther Vandross	DJ Kenny Parker	3:49
6.	"Mad Bent"	Gardner; Parker	DJ Kenny Parker	4:19
7.	"Sendin 'Em Back"	Gardner; Parker; Eric Brooks; James Robinson; Rico Smith; Joseph Kirkland	DJ Kenny Parker	3:25
8.	"No Doubt"	Gardner; Parker; Christopher Wallace; Osten Harvey; Hal David; Burt Bacharach	DJ Kenny Parker	4:05
9.	"Real Niggaz Up"	Gardner; E. Dewgarde; D. Dewgarde; Parker; Tim Perkins; F. Rhett	Da Beatminerz	3:40
10.	"What Goes On"	Gardner; Parker; Robert Bell; Ronald Bell; Dennis Thomas; Robert Mickens; Charles Smith; George Brown; Richard Westfield; Alton Taylor	DJ Kenny Parker	4:21
Total length:				40:44

Sample credits

- Track 2 contains samples from "People Make the World Go Round" performed by the Stylistics and written by Thom Bell and Linda Creed, and "How Many MC's" performed by Black Moon
- Track 5 contains portions of "Promise Me" written by Luther Vandross
- Track 7 contains a sample from "The Next Level" performed by Tha Alkaholiks and Diamond D
- Track 8 contains portions of "Warning" performed by Notorious B.I.G. and written by Christopher Wallace, Osten Harvey, Hal David and Burt Bacharach
- Track 10 contains portions of "Summer Madness" written by Alton Taylor, Robert "Spike" Mickens, Robert "Kool" Bell, Dennis "Dee Tee" Thomas, Ricky Westfield, George Brown, Charles Smith and Ronald Bell

== Personnel ==
- Heather B. Gardner – vocals
- Jamal "Lil' Fame" Grinnage – vocals (track 4)
- Eric "Billy Danze" Murray – vocals (track 4)
- Kenny Parker – producer (tracks: 1–8, 10)
- Ewart "DJ Evil Dee" Dewgarde – producer (track 9)
- Walter "Mr. Walt" Dewgarde – producer (track 9)
- Gail D. Butler – executive producer, management
- Charles Dixon – executive producer
- Tom Coyne – mastering
- David Carpenter – engineering
- Dexter Thibou – engineering
- Kieran Walsh – engineering
- Luis Tineo – engineering
- Max Vargas – engineering
- Lu Ann Graffeo – art direction
- Randall Martin – design
- Carl Posey – photography

== Charts ==
Chart (1996)	Peak position
US Top R&B/Hip-Hop Albums (Billboard)	36
US Heatseekers Albums (Billboard)	14
