= Carl Bean =

American Protestant clergy and HIV/AIDS activist (1944–2021)

- Born: May 26, 1944; Baltimore, Maryland, U.S.
- Died: September 7, 2021 (aged 77); Los Angeles, California, U.S.
- Occupations: Minister, singer, and HIV/AIDS activist
- Organization: Minority AIDS Project
- Known for: HIV/AIDS activism
- Notable work: I Was Born This Way
- Title: Reverend

Carl Bean (May 26, 1944 – September 7, 2021) was an African-American singer and activist who was the founding prelate of the Unity Fellowship Church Movement, a liberal Protestant denomination that is particularly welcoming of lesbians, gay and bisexual African Americans.

== Life and activism ==
Bean was born on May 26, 1944, in Baltimore, Maryland. Before founding the first church of the denomination, the Unity Fellowship Church, Los Angeles, in 1975, Bean was a Motown and disco singer, noted particularly for his version of the early gay liberation song "I Was Born This Way". It inspired Lady Gaga's 2011 album and song of the same name. He was openly gay.

In 1982, Bean became an activist, working on behalf of people with AIDS in Washington, D.C., and Los Angeles, coinciding with the rise of the AIDS epidemic. He was involved with several activist organizations, including the National Minority AIDS Council, which he co-founded alongside activists like Gilberto Gerald, Craig G. Harris, Paul Kawata, Calu Lester, Don Edwards, Suki Ports, Timm Offutt, Norm Nickens, Marie St.-Cyr, and Sandra McDonald in 1987.

Bean founded the Minority AIDS Project in Los Angeles with the goal of supporting people with AIDS, especially young African-American men. It is still in operation.

In 1992, the AIDS Healthcare Foundation named an AIDS hospice center in South Los Angeles after him. It was in operation from 1992 to 2006.

Bean's autobiography, I Was Born This Way, came out in 2010. The film biography directed by Daniel Junge and Sam Pollard, "I Was Born This Way" premiered at the Tribeca Film Festival on June 5, 2025. He died at the age of 77 on September 7, 2021.

== Books ==
- Bean, Reverend Carl (June 1, 2010). I Was Born This Way. Simon & Schuster. ISBN 978-1-4165-9282-2. – Bean's autobiography
