= James Earl Hardy =

American playwright, novelist, and journalist

- Born: 1966 (age 59–60); New York City, U.S.
- Education: St. John's University; Columbia University Graduate School of Journalism
- Occupations: Playwright; novelist; journalist

James Earl Hardy (born 1966 in Bedford-Stuyvesant, Brooklyn, New York) is an American playwright, novelist, and journalist. Generally considered the first to depict same-sex love stories that take place within the hip-hop community, his writing is largely characterized by its exploration of the African-American LGBTQ experience. Hardy's best-known work is the B-Boy Blues series. The B-Boys Blues series comprises six novels and one short story. B-Boy Blues was adapted into a play in 2013 and into a film, directed and co-written by Jussie Smollett, in 2021.

Hardy attended undergraduate school at St. John's University and afterward went on to graduate from the Columbia University Graduate School of Journalism in 1993. From 1992 to 1994, he wrote for Entertainment Weekly as a music journalist.

== Bibliography ==
- Men of the House: A B-Boy Blues Novel (2018)
- B-Boy Blues (2013) (play), Downtown Urban Theater Festival "Audience Award " winner
- Can You Feel What I'm Saying?: An Erotic Anthology (2012), Rainbow Award Finalist for Best LGBT Erotica
- "Pride" (short story), in For Colored Boys Who Have Considered Suicide When the Rainbow is Still Not Enough: Coming of Age, Coming Out, and Coming Home (2012)
- “Is It Still Jood To Ya?” (short story), in Visible Lives: A Tribute To E. Lynn Harris by Stanley Bennett Clay and Terrance Dean (2010), African American Literary Award nominee
- Confessions of a Homo Thug Porn Star (2010) (play), Downtown Urban Theater Festival "Best Dramatic Short" winner
- A House Is Not a Home: A B-Boy Blues Novel (2005)
- Love the One You're With: A B-Boy Blues Novel (2002)
- The Day Eazy-E Died: A B-Boy Novel (2001)
- Fag Gags: Reads By, For & About The Children (2000) (satire)
- If Only for One Nite (1998) (novel), American Library Association LGBT Caucus Honoree
- Back 2 Back: An Anthology Featuring the Best-Sellers: B-Boy Blues and 2nd Time Around (1997)
- 2nd Time Around (1996) (novel)
- Boyz II Men (1996) (biography)
- "Take the 'A' train" (short story), in Shade: An Anthology of Fiction by Gay Men of African Descent (1996)
- B-Boy Blues: A Seriously Sexy, Fiercely Funny, Black-on-Black Love Story (1994), Lambda Literary Award (Lammy) finalist for Best LGBT/Small Press Title
- Spike Lee (1991) (biography)
