= Phill Wilson =

American AIDS activist

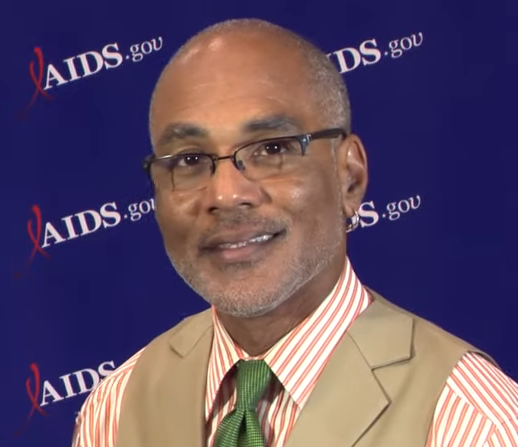
- Phill Wilson at AIDS 2014
- Born: Chicago, Illinois, U.S.
- Education: Illinois Wesleyan University (BA)
- Occupation: AIDS activist
- Years active: 1986 – present

Phill Wilson is an American activist who founded the Black AIDS Institute in 1999, and served as its CEO, and is a prominent African-American HIV/AIDS activist.

== Career ==
Phill Wilson's career in activism started after he and his partner, Chris Brownlie, were both diagnosed with HIV in the early 1980s. This was at a time when the AIDS epidemic was just starting in the United States, and Wilson has said he did not feel like anyone was bringing together the black community to solve the problem. The country believed that AIDS was a gay disease, and outreach was primarily focused in white, gay communities, when Wilson believed that AIDS affected the black community much more. When his partner died of an HIV-related illness in 1989, Wilson channeled his grief into activism.

In 1981, Wilson was already involved in the gay community in Chicago through sports activities and social activities. He attended Illinois Wesleyan University, where he earned his B.A. in theater and Spanish. When he graduated, he moved to Los Angeles in 1982, and became involved with the National Association of Black and White Men Together. His first jump into the activist lifestyle came in 1983, when he read the poem "Where will you be when they come?" at a candlelight vigil for AIDS victims, which he also helped organize.

After organizing the candlelight vigil in 1983, Wilson began working as the Director of Policy and Planning for the AIDS Project in Los Angeles. During this time he was also the AIDS Coordinator for Los Angeles. From 1990 to 1995, Wilson served as the co-chair of the Los Angeles HIV Health Commission. In 1995, he became a member of the HRSA AIDS Advisory Committee. Wilson took a break from work in 1997, when his disease became too immobilizing. Wilson went back to work in 1999, when he founded the Black AIDS Institute. In 2010, Wilson became appointed to President Obama's Advisory Council on HIV/AIDS, becoming the co-chair of the disparities subcommittee. During his career, Wilson has also worked as a World AIDS Summit delegate. Also during his career, he, along with other Black AIDS activists, "urged the Centers for Disease Control and Prevention to provide additional funding to African American groups eager to educate and mobilize their community around HIV/AIDS issues. The result was the announcement of a 5-year domestic 'Act Against AIDS' campaign that resulted in 14 Blacks organizations, including the National Newspaper Publishers Association, being awarded grants to hire an AIDS coordinator to expand their work."

In December 2018, Wilson stepped down as CEO after nearly twenty years, in order to better allow the organization to plan for the future. He was replaced by Raniyah Copeland.

Wilson has said that when he dies, he hopes people will remember him for not giving up. His biggest fear is that the black community will give up fighting against this disease.

== Published works ==
Wilson has published articles in The New York Times, the Los Angeles Times, LA Weekly, Essence, Ebony, Vibe, and Jet and POZ.

== Awards and honors ==
In 1999 Wilson was inducted into the Chicago Gay and Lesbian Hall of Fame. In 2001, he was given the Leadership for a Changing World award by the Ford Foundation. In 2004, he was the recipient of the Discovery Health Channel Medical Honor. He was also "named one of the '2005 Black History Makers in the Making' by Black Entertainment Television." Wilson also received the Delta Spirit Award from the Delta Sigma Theta Los Angeles chapter. In July 2016, it was announced he would win GLAD Legal Advocates & Defenders’ 2016 Spirit of Justice Award.

In June 2020, in honor of the 50th anniversary of the first LGBTQ Pride parade, Queerty named him among the fifty heroes “leading the nation toward equality, acceptance, and dignity for all people”.
