= African-American LGBTQ community =

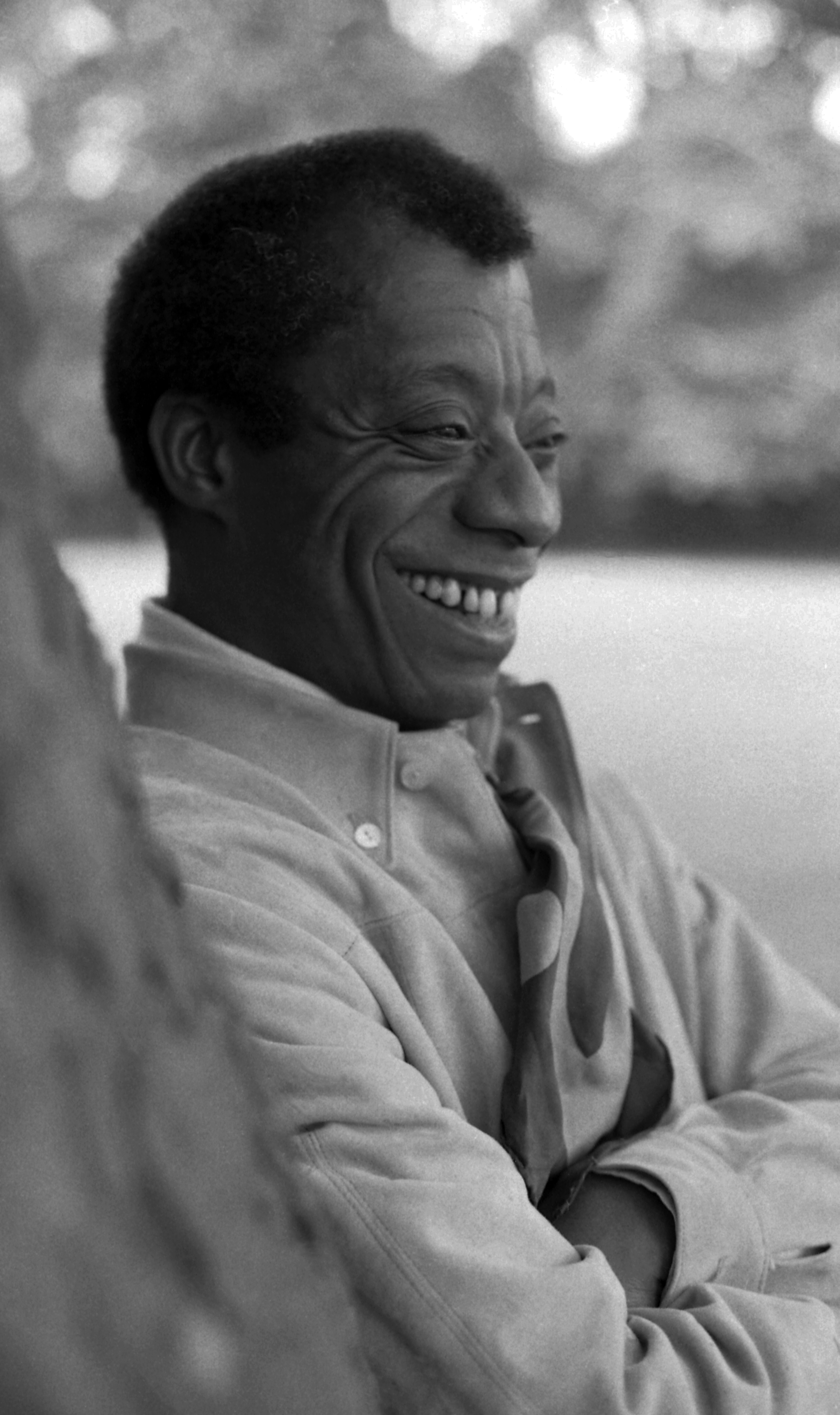
American writer and civil rights activist James Baldwin in Los Angeles, 1964. Baldwin was a prominent trailblazer of LGBTQ literature in the 20th century, particularly his 1956 novel Giovanni's Room

The African-American LGBTQ community, otherwise referred to as the Black American LGBTQ or Black Queer community, is part of the overall LGBTQ culture and overall African-American culture. The initialism LGBTQ stands for lesbian, gay, bisexual, transgender, and queer.

A landmark event for the LGBTQ community, and the Black LGBTQ community in particular, was the Stonewall uprising in 1969, in New York City's Greenwich Village, where Black activists including Stormé DeLarverie (who instigated the uprising) and Marsha P. Johnson (who was in the vanguard of the later pushback against the police) played key roles in the events.

Following Stonewall, the 1996 legal precedent Romer v. Evans also had a major impact. Ruling in favor of Romer, Justice Kennedy asserted in the case commentary that Colorado's state constitutional amendment denying LGBTQ people protection from discrimination "bore no purpose other than to burden LGB persons". Advancements in public policy, social discourse, and public knowledge have assisted in the progression and coming out of many Black LGBTQ individuals. Statistics show an increase in accepting attitudes towards lesbians and gays among general society. A Gallup survey shows that acceptance rates went from 38% in 1992 to 52% in 2001. However, when looking at the LGBTQ community through a racial lens, the Black community lacks many of these advantages.

4.6% of African Americans self-identified as LGBT in 2016. African American women are more likely to openly identify as LGBTQ than African American men. Surveys and research have shown that 80% of African-Americans say gays and lesbians endure discrimination compared to 61% of White Americans. Black members of the LGBTQ community are not only seen as the "other" due to their race, they are also seen as the "other" due to their sexuality, as a result, they occasionally hear both racist and anti-LGBTQ rhetoric.

== History ==
=== Before Stonewall ===
The first African-American person who was known to describe himself as a drag queen was William Dorsey Swann, born enslaved in Hancock, Maryland. Swann was the first American on record who pursued legal and political action to defend the LGBTQ community's right to assemble. During the 1880s and 1890s, Swann organized a series of drag balls in Washington, D.C. Swann was arrested in police raids numerous times, including in the first documented case of arrests for female impersonation in the United States, on April 12, 1888.

Trans woman Lucy Hicks Anderson, born in 1886 in Waddy, Kentucky, lived her life serving as a domestic worker in her teen years, eventually becoming a socialite and madame in Oxnard, California, during the 1920s and 1930s. In 1945, she was tried in Ventura County for perjury and fraud for receiving spousal allotments from the military, as her dressing and presenting as a woman was considered masquerading. She lost this case but avoided a lengthy jail sentence, only to be tried again by the federal government shortly thereafter. She too lost this case, but she and her husband were sentenced to jail time. In the trial of Hicks Anderson, the testimonies of five doctors was included all of which attested that "Hicks Anderson 'was definitely a man.'" In defense, Hicks Anderson rebutted stating that they had 'hidden organs,' which could only be seen through autopsy following death. To avoid incarceration, Hicks Anderson pledged her corpse for indefinite medical use and experimentation. After serving their sentences, Lucy and her then husband, Ruben Anderson, relocated to Los Angeles, where they lived quietly until her death in 1954.

==== Harlem Renaissance ====
During the Harlem Renaissance, a subculture of LGBTQ African-American artists and entertainers emerged, including people like Alain Locke, Countee Cullen, Langston Hughes, Claude McKay, Wallace Thurman, Richard Bruce Nugent, Bessie Smith, Ma Rainey, Moms Mabley, Mabel Hampton, Alberta Hunter, and Gladys Bentley.

Places like Savoy Ballroom and the Rockland Palace hosted drag-ball extravaganzas with prizes awarded for the best costumes. Langston Hughes depicted the balls as "spectacles of color". George Chauncey, author of Gay New York: Gender, Urban Culture, and the Making of the Gay Male World, 1890–1940, wrote that during this period "perhaps nowhere were more men willing to venture out in public in drag than in Harlem".

=== The spark of the Stonewall riot ===
The Stonewall riots began when butch lesbian Stormé DeLarverie fought back against the police who were violently brutalizing her. She was very adamant on not allowing the police to discriminate against LGBTQ people, especially anyone who she considered her family, specifically butch lesbians and street kids. She walked around with a hidden rifle and referred to herself as the "guardian of the lesbians in The Village." Even as an octogenarian she still felt it was her civic duty to protect anyone who she felt was in danger of being brutalized by the police. Oftentimes they would arrest people for violating the "three piece rule." A common law cited during arrests was "three articles," meaning that an individual had to be wearing at least three items of clothing that matched their assigned sex at birth. The police used these as grounds to arrest trans people on multiple occasions. It was still an active law up until recently in 2011 when it was finally repealed. DeLarverie was constantly being arrested for "impersonation of a male" because she was always dressed in masculine presenting clothing. During the '50s and '60s, any hint of homosexuality or gender deviance was grounds for arrest, losing your job and often your life. Stormé DeLarverie was a Black/biracial singer, drag king and MC, originally born and raised in New Orleans. She started singing in New Orleans clubs at 15, and soon after began touring around Europe, eventually landing in New York City and hosted at the Apollo Theater. After the uprising was underway, African-American drag queens Marsha P. Johnson and Zazu Nova were "in the vanguard" of the pushback against the police.

LGBTQ African Americans and Latinos were among the protestors, notably the LGBTQ youth and young adults who slept in nearby Christopher Park.

It was a rebellion, it was an uprising, it was a civil rights disobedience – it wasn't no damn riot.

— Stormé DeLarverie

=== Post-Stonewall riot - timeline ===
In 1979, the Lambda Student Alliance (LSA) was established at Howard University. It was the first openly Black LGBTQorganization on a college campus.

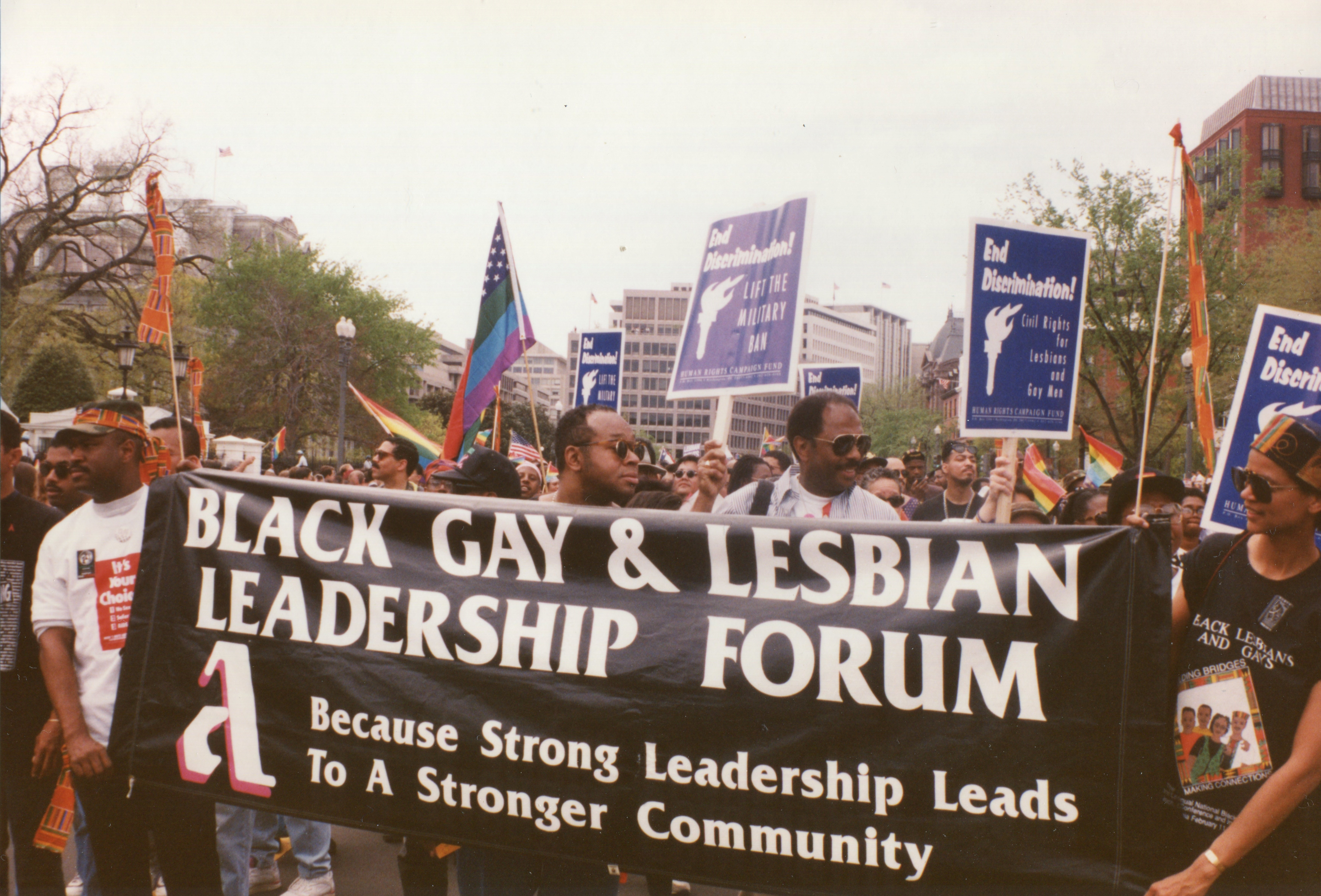
The Black Gay & Lesbian Leadership Forum at the 1993 March on Washington for Lesbian, Gay and Bi Equal Rights and Liberation

In 1983, after a battle over LGB participation in the 20th anniversary March on Washington, a group of African-American leaders endorsed a national gay rights bill and put Audre Lorde from the National Coalition of Black Gays as speaker on the agenda. In 1984, Rev. Jesse Jackson included LGB people as part of his Rainbow/PUSH.

In 1989, Kimberlé Crenshaw coined the term "intersectionality," to show how different aspects of one's identity, including race, sexuality, gender, etc., combine to affect their life.

In 1993, William F. Gibson, national chairman of the board of NAACP, endorsed the March on Washington for Lesbian, Gay and Bi Equal Rights and Liberation and also supported repealing the ban on LGB service in the military.

On February 2, 2009, the first episode of RuPaul's Drag Race aired, normalizing and promoting drag, and winning many awards.

On May 19, 2012, the NAACP passed a resolution in support of same-sex marriage. That same month and year, President Obama became the first sitting president to openly support same-sex marriage.

In 2013, the Black Lives Matter movement was established by three Black women, two of whom identify as queer. From its inception, the founders of Black Lives Matter have always put Black LGBTQvoices at the center of the conversation.

In 2017, Moonlight, a Black queer centric film, won several highly acclaimed awards.

In 2018, the critically acclaimed TV show Pose premiered, which is the first to feature a predominately people of color LGBTQ cast on a mainstream channel.

In 2019, Atlanta's mayor Keisha Lance Bottoms became the first elected official to establish and host an annual event recognizing and celebrating the Black LGBTQ community. Also in 2019, Spelman College which is part of the Atlanta University Center, became the first historically Black college or university to fund a chair in queer studies. The endowed chair is named after civil rights activist and famed poet Audre Lorde and backed by a matching gift of $2 million from philanthropist Jon Stryker. And also in 2019, Chicago's mayor Lori Lightfoot became the first openly queer Black person elected to lead a major city.

In 2020, Ritchie Torres and Mondaire Jones became the first openly queer Black members of the United States Congress.

== Cultural ==
=== Performances and social practices ===
==== Ballroom ====
"Ball culture", "drag ball culture", the "house-ballroom community", the "ballroom scene" or "ballroom culture" describes a young African-American and Latin American underground LGBTQ subculture that originated in New York City, in which people "walk" (i.e., compete) for trophies, prizes, and glory at events known as balls. Ball culture consists of events that mix performance, dance, lip-syncing, and modeling. Attendees dance, vogue, walk, pose, and support one another in numerous drag and performance competition categories. Categories are designed to simultaneously epitomize and satirize various genders and social classes, while also offering an escape from reality.

The culture extends beyond the extravagant events as many participants in ball culture also belong to groups known as "houses", a longstanding tradition in LGBTQcommunities, where chosen families of friends live in households together, forming relationships and community to replace families of origin from which they may be estranged.

Typically, installed in these houses are family dynamics based on a gender-sex system curated by the community itself. "Mothers" are roles taken by more feminine presenting members of the house, typically known as "Butch queens up in drags/drag queens" (feminine-presenting gay men), or "Femme queens" (transgender women). "Fathers" are roles given to masculine presenting members, such as "Butches" (transgender men), and "Butch queens" (gay men). This form of family dynamic provides a sense of "home" for outcast Black LGBTQ+ youth, many using ballroom spaces and their houses as a replacement for the biological families. This idea extends further than Ballroom, as Black scholars also refer to this form of queer found-family as "kinship", substituting ballroom terms like "mother" and "father" for "play aunties", "school moms", and "everybody Grandma".

===== Kiki scene/Kiki-balls =====
The "Kiki-scene" is an extension of Ballroom. While Ballroom is closely associated with competitions and performances, the Kiki scene refers to a subsection of Black queer culture which focuses on youth resources and social services, yet also serves as a practice area for the younger participants to compete. "Kiki-balls" are held and cater to LGBTQ+ youth and teens, and members of the Kiki-scene usually will graduate from Kiki-balls and advance to compete into the "Main-scene", being Ballroom. Due to this, Ballrooms will usually have higher stakes and subjective to bigger prizes.

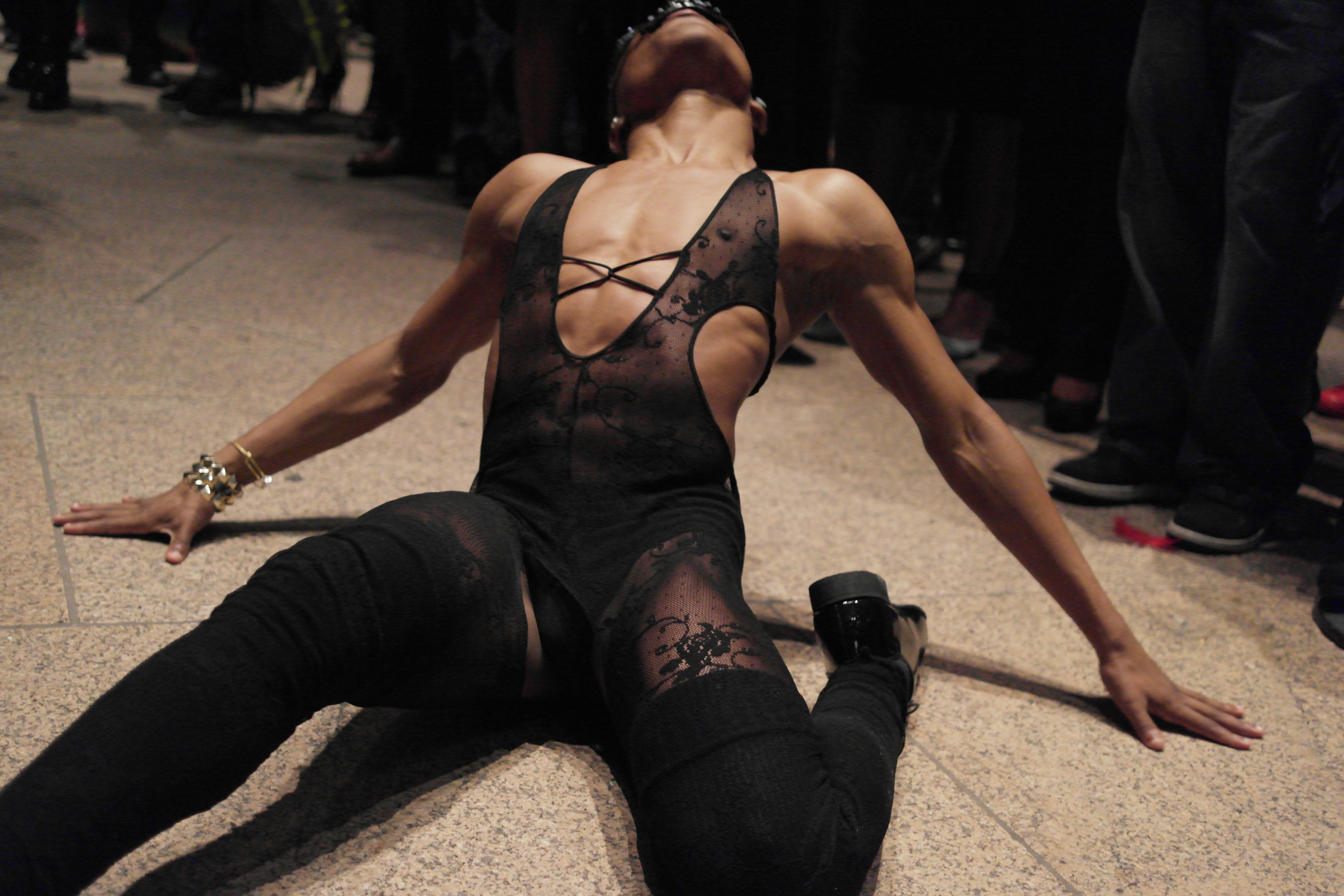
A person participating at a ball

==== Black gay pride ====
Several major cities across the nation host Black gay pride events focused on uplifting and celebrating Black LGBTQ community and culture. These events are held separately from White dominated and/or corporate pride celebrations in order to highlight the specific histories of Black-queer people have endured. Many of these celebrations are funded through the International Federation of Black Prides, an umbrella organization for Black Pride organizations throughout the world.

==== Voguing ====
Voguing is a style of dance that arose from Harlem ballroom cultures, as danced by African-American and Latino gay/trans people, from the early 1960s through the 1980s. The drag competitions that began during this time eventually shifted from elaborate pageantry to vogue dance battles. Inspired by the style of Ancient Egyptian hieroglyphs and the famous images of models in Vogue magazine, voguing is characterized by striking a series of poses as if one is modeling for a photo shoot. Arm and leg movements are angular, linear, rigid, and move swiftly from one static position to another.

Dance competitions often involved throwing "shade," or subtle insults directed at one another to impress the judges and the audience. The competition style was originally called "presentation" and later "performance." Over the years, the dance evolved into the more intricate and acrobatic form that is now called "vogue".

=== Language ===
Language specific to Black American LGBTQ communities has been documented as early as 1920s Harlem Renaissance and has made its way into mainstream culture in the form of slang. Queer slang commonly used in the 21st century takes roots in Black history and culture – including theater, ballroom, and drag.

The terms and phrases used in everyday speech and language are largely taken from the Black and Latinx queer communities and, more specifically, come from large "house names" like Crystal LaBeija, Dorian Corey, Paris Dupree, Kim Pendavis, Junior LaBeija, and many other house members, each of whom not credited with the origin of common slang terms and phrases.

The Harlem Renaissance in the early 1900s was a pivotal moment in the dissemination of language. According to Wallace Thurman, Harlem attracted people from not just the American South, but the British West Indies, Africa, and South America. This meant that Harlem brought forward not only an American/Western form of language, but an array of different dialects, languages, and ways of speech which formulated the Black/Queer vernacular during its time.

Black and Latinx queer people were historically discriminated against and/ or excluded from predominately white balls leading to the creation of the Harlem ballroom culture that permeates throughout mainstream culture today. At these Black and Latinx balls, the dynamics within mainstream language were explored and challenged to allow for creative expressions of gender and sexuality. Language used within the Black queer community is often co-opted and described as "gay" language due the common positioning of a gay person as being white by default. This association comes from the longtime tradition of excluding Black people from academia and simultaneous lack of research on non-white communities.

Black-American authors such as Alain LeRoy Locke and Thurman were crucial to the recording of Black linguistic writing and vernacular culture, equally alike were the queer musicians who carried their language through the music they curated. Black-queer vernacular is rooted in many queer artists' lyrics of the Harlem Renaissance, an example being sapphic blues singer Lucille Bogan who wrote "B.D. Woman's Blues" in 1935. "B.D." stands for "bulldyke", or "bulldagger", which in the early 19th century was used to refer to Black butch lesbians, better known in the 21st century as a "stud".

Later on in the 1960s, The Stonewall riots served as a time for reflection on common LGBTQ terms and slurs. The Stonewall riots led to people critically think about queer people's discriminatory placement in society and queer people and allies began reevaluating this language in attempts to reclaim it.

Other pivotal moments include prominent ballroom scenes across the country and popular queer media like the movie Paris is Burning and hit reality TV show RuPaul's Drag Race. Due to the heavy overlap between drag and Ballroom, contestants on RuPaul's Drag Race use Black queer language despite being non-Black. As this lexicon has become more mainstream, Black queer vernacular is found throughout Western media and often labeled without credit to its Black queer origins, such as in art and music, U.S. television and entertainment, and 21st century popular western-centered speech and slang.

==== Terms and phrases ====
Below are terms and phrases that originated in AAVE, the Black queer community, and Ballroom spaces; they have been appropriated by mainstream society and described as slang or Gen Z internet talk.

- Boots/the house down

An intensifier that evolved from drag and ballroom culture used to add emphasis or affirm a compliment given to someone. "The house down" is often paired with this term to add even more emphasis.

Examples: "your makeup is flawless boots" or "your show was fierce the house down boots" or "fierce boots the house down"

- Gagged or gagging

An adjective or verb used to describe a situation in which you are shocked, surprised, amazed, etc. to the point of speechlessness. This term has been appropriated and brought into mainstream society and is often classified as Gen Z Slang but it has origins in Black Queer drag and ballroom spaces

Examples: "omg your outfit has me gagged", "they will be gagging when I pull up to the event"

- Read or Reading

Noun: an insult, observation, or comment skillfully and playfully crafted to exaggerate a flaw in someone or something directly; these are usually rooted in some level of truth and done in a creative or funny way.

Verb: to accentuate or expose someone's flaws; to insult or playfully jab at someone.

- Read for filth/Read to filth

Idiom: reading someone in a much more harsh and disrespectfully thorough way; "to/for filth" adds a more intense meaning in comparison to simply reading someone

- Shade or Throwing shade

Noun: the statement or look someone gives to imply dissatisfaction or insult; these are often done as backhanded compliments to spread disdain.

Verb: evolving from reading, but statements are more nuanced or indirect ways of expressing criticism.

- Stud

A stud is a term used for Black lesbians who dress or are perceived as masculine. This title stems from racial-sexual stereotypes dating back to the period of slavery where Black women were placed into labor alongside men, tasked to complete "masculine" presenting roles and jobs. This furthered their inability to access their "gender and sexuality".

Outdated terms that refer to masculine-queer persons like "stud" also include "bulldaggers" and "bulldykes", either due to their physical masculine appearance, or dressing in masculine clothing.

- Down-low

In the United States, down-low or DL is an African-American slang term specifically used within the African-American community that typically refers to a subculture of Black men who usually identify as heterosexual but actively seek sexual encounters and relations with other men, practice gay cruising, and frequently adopt a specific hip-hop attire during these activities. They avoid sharing this information even if they have female sexual partner(s), they are married to a woman, or they are single. Some even publicly surround themselves with excessive amounts of females to cover up their true sexual identity. The term is also used to refer to a related sexual identity. Down-low has been viewed as "a type of impression management that some of the informants use to present themselves in a manner that is consistent with perceived norms about masculine attribute, attitudes, and behavior".

- Kiki

A "Kiki" is a get-together of friends for gossiping and chit-chat, usually inferring to have fun. Is also used in reference to the "Kiki-scene", which emphasizes its relation to ballroom culture.

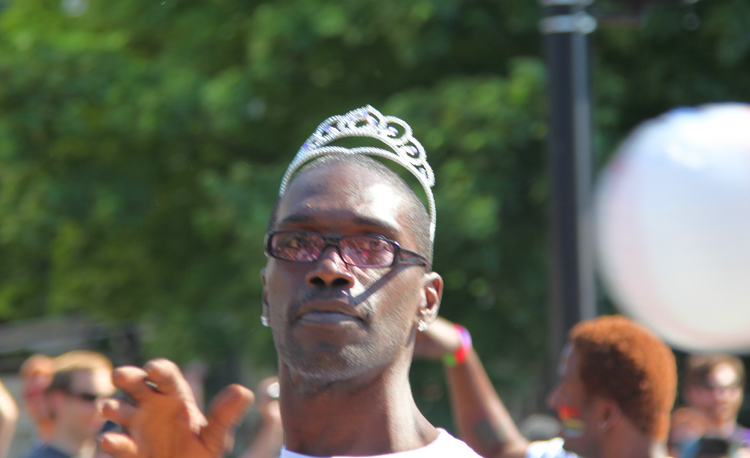
African American man shows his pride wearing a tiara at Capital Pride in Washington, D.C.

== Persecution inside the Black community ==
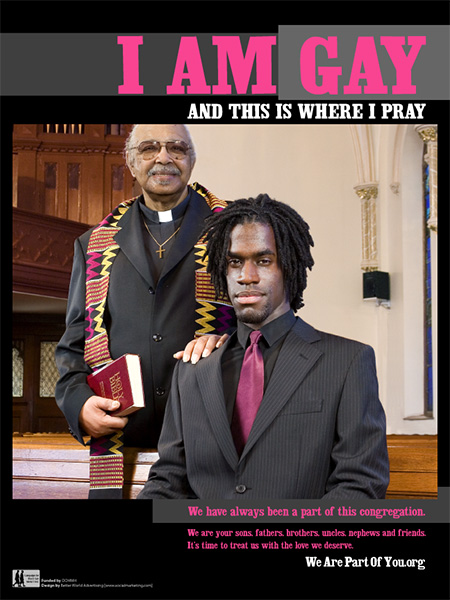
A campaign ad used to combat church homophobia

It has been asserted that the African-American community, according to e.g. Don Lemon and the portrayal of 2011 film Pariah, is largely homophobic. However, as of 2024, a majority in the African-American community supported Black LGBTQ+ rights, including a majority of church-attending Black respondents. Posited reasons for homophobia in the community, past or present, include the image young, Black males are expected to convey in the public sphere; that homosexuality is seen as antithetical to being Black in the African-American community; and the high association of the African-American community with the church in the United States.

In the past, it has been reported that African Americans disagreed with LGBTQ civil liberties more than their white counterparts; some theorize this is because of conservative churches' role in advocating for African-American civil liberties and that this advocacy has expanded into the LGBTQ population. African-American LGBTQpeople may identify more with their racial/ethnic category rather than their sexual orientation as a main identity reference group. They can be hesitant about revealing their sexuality to their friends and families because of homosexuality's incompatibility with cultural gender roles.

=== Religion ===
In addition to facing discrimination for being Black outside their racial community, Black LGBTQ people have to deal with discrimination for being LGBTQ inside their religious community, a.k.a. the Black church. The Black church is often noted as a pillar of the Black community.

Due to the history of slavery in the United States, Black people were often denied the freedom to choose their sexual partners. Sticking to these heteronormative ideas set by slave owners fostered a notion of "respectability politics". Specifically, to be respected, one must not stray from typical gender and sexuality. Additionally, the Black church continued to emphasize heterosexual marriage. Despite the emphasis of "personal freedom and social justice" in the Black church, members tend to stick to this conservative family view, which is "linked to intolerance of gays and lesbians".

Studies have revealed the fact that Black LGBTQ individuals who were inculcated with homophobic beliefs developed increased and internalized homonegativity. Additionally, being exposed to homophobic imagery impacts the mental development of Black LGBTQ youth.

=== Youth homelessness ===
Black LGBTQ youth are disproportionately homeless, often because they run away from home or are forced out. Black youth made up 14% of the total youth population in 2014, but 31% of the homeless LGBTQ population that year. A major reason ball culture became popular in the Black LGBTQ community is because some of the competing houses provided shelter and food to homeless LGBTQ youth actively participating in the ballroom scene. Additionally, most major cities have non-profit homeless shelters that specialize in helping LGBTQ youth.

=== Education ===
Education has an impact on homophobic attitudes and views of sexuality within the Black community. This follows a nationwide trend; more educated people are likely to be more accepting of non-heterosexual sexuality. Better education typically means less affiliation to conservative religions or denominations, which limits the influence of socially conservative ideas.

Barack Obama acknowledged homophobia within the African-American community and said; "If we are honest with ourselves, we'll acknowledge that our own community has not always been true to Martin Luther King's vision of a beloved community ... We have scorned our gay brothers and sisters instead of embracing them".

=== Hip-hop ===
Hip hop has long been one of the least LGBTQ-friendly genres of music, with a significant body of the genre containing homophobic views and anti-gay lyrics. Attitudes towards homosexuality in hip hop culture have historically been negative. Gay slurs like "no homo", and "pause" can be heard in hip hop lyrics from the industry's biggest stars. According to the Los Angeles Times, these slurs were used to put "queerness as a punchline". Artists like Lil Nas X and Kevin Abstract have been changing the face of hip-hop to make it more inclusive. On March 9, 2021, Lil Nas X released the song and music video for the song "Montero". Both the song and music video depict the struggles of being gay while within a homophobic culture and society.

== Economic disparities ==
The current federal law, that is enforced by the Equal Employment Opportunity Commission, prohibits employment discrimination. The federal law specifies no discrimination because of race, color, religion, sex, national origin, age, disability, or genetic information. The current federal law does not specify sexual orientation. There is legislation currently being proposed to congress known as the ENDA (Employment Non-Discrimination Act) that would include hindering discrimination based on sexual orientation, too. Most recently, the Equality Act would do this as well. However, current policies do not protect sexual orientation and affect the employment rates as well as LGBTQ individual's incomes and overall economic status. The Black population in the United States of America as of the 2010 consensus is 14,129,983 people. Out of that, it is estimated that 4.60 percent of the Black population identify as LGBT.

Within the Black LGBTQ community many face economic disparities and discrimination. Statistically Black LGBTQ individuals are more likely to be unemployed than their non-Black counterparts. According to the Williams Institute, the vast difference lies in the survey responses of "not in workforce" from different populations geographically. Black LGBTQ individuals, nonetheless, face the dilemma of marginalization in the job market. As of 2013, same-sex couples' income is lower than those in heterosexual relationships with an average of $25,000 income.

For opposite-sex couples, statistics show a $1,700 increase. Analyzing economic disparities on an intersectional level (gender and race), a Black man is likely to receive a higher income than a woman. For men, statistics shows approximately a $3,000 increase from the average income for all Black LGBTQ identified individuals, and a $6,000 increase in salary for same-sex male couples.

Female same-sex couples receive $3,000 less than the average income for all Black LGBTQ individuals and approximately $6,000 less than their male counterparts. (Look at Charts below) The income disparity among Black LGBTQ families affects the lives of their dependents, contributing to poverty rates. Children growing up in low-income households are more likely to remain in the poverty cycle. Due to economic disparities in the Black LGBTQ community, 32% of children raised by gay Black men are in poverty. However, only 13% of children raised by heterosexual Black parents are in poverty and only 7% for white heterosexual parents.

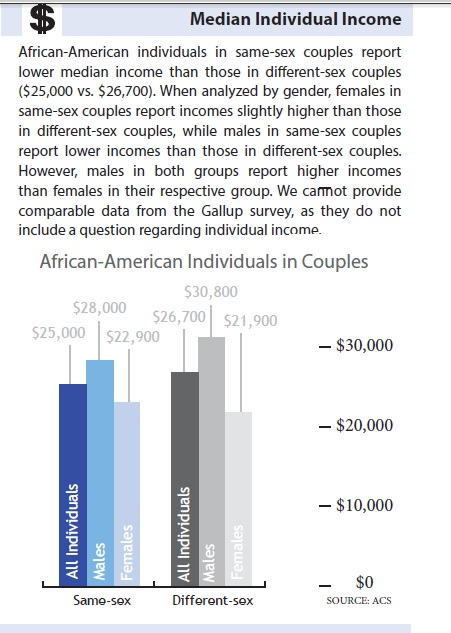
Median Incomes for African American Individuals

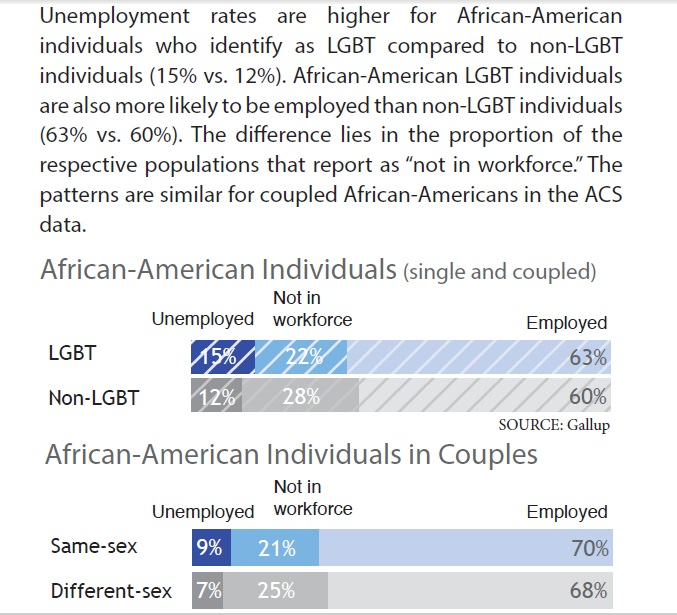
Chart of unemployment percentages of couples and single African American individuals.

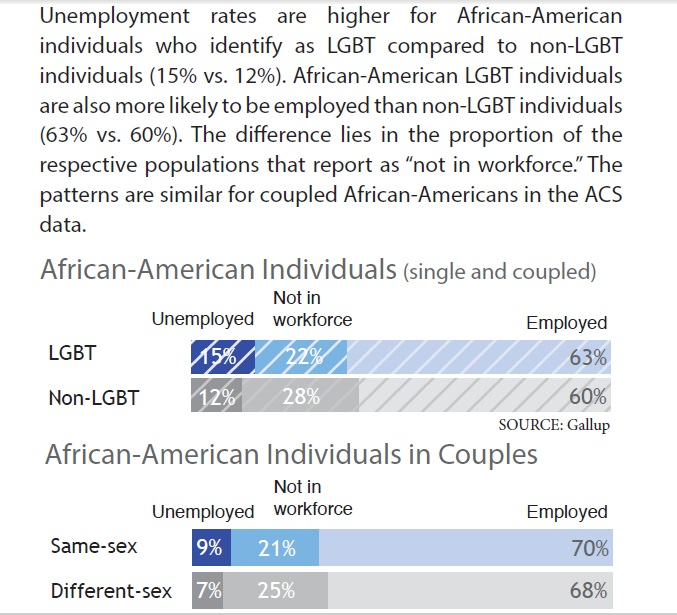
African Americans and Same-Sex Couples

Comparatively looking at gender, race, and sexual orientation, Black women same-sex couples are likely to face more economic disparities than Black women in an opposite sex relationship. Black women in same-sex couples earn $42,000 compared to Black women in opposite-sex relationships who earn $51,000, a twenty-one percent increase in income. Economically, Black women same-sex couples are also less likely to be able to afford housing. Approximately fifty percent of Black women same-sex couples can afford to buy housing compared to white women same-sex couples who have a seventy-two percent rate in home ownership.

== Black transgender people ==
Black trans flag created by Raquel Willis

Black transgender individuals face higher rates of discrimination than Black gay, lesbian and bisexual individuals. While policies have been implemented to inhibit discrimination based on gender identity, transgender individuals of color lack legal support. Transgender individuals are still not supported by legislation and policies like the wider LGBTQ community is. New reports show vast discrimination to the Black transgender community. Reports show in the National Transgender Discrimination Survey that Black transgender individuals, along with gender non-conforming individuals, have high rates of poverty.

Statistics shows a 34% rate of households receiving an income less than $10,000 a year. According to the data, that is twice the rate when looking at transgender individuals of all races and four times higher than the general Black population. Many face poverty due to discrimination and bias when trying to purchase a home or apartment. 38% of Black trans individuals report in the Discrimination Survey being turned down property due to their gender identity. 31% of the Black individuals were evicted due to their identity.

=== Violence ===
Black transgender individuals also face disparities in education, employment, and health. In education, Black transgender and non-conforming persons face brutish environments while attending school. Reporting rates show 49% of Black transgender individuals being harassed from kindergarten to twelfth grade. Physical assault rates are at 27% percent, and sexual assault is at 15%. These drastically high rates have an effect on the mental health of Black transgender individuals.

As a result of high assault/harassment and discrimination, suicide rates are at the same rate (49%) as harassment to Black transgender individuals. Employment discrimination rates are similarly higher. Statistics show a 26% rate of unemployed Black transgender and non-conforming persons. Many Black trans people have lost their jobs or have been denied jobs due to gender identity: 32% are unemployed, and 48% were denied jobs.

== Black lesbian culture and identity ==
=== Black lesbian identity ===
Historically, lesbian spaces have been characterized by racism and racial discrimination. Racial and class divisions sometimes made it difficult for Black and white women to see themselves as on the same side in the feminist movement. Black women faced misogyny from within the Black community even during the fight for Black liberation. Homophobia was also pervasive in the Black community during the Black Arts Movement because "feminine" homosexuality was seen as undermining Black power.

Black lesbians especially struggled with the stigma they faced within their own community. With unique experiences and often very different struggles, Black lesbians have developed an identity that is more than the sum of its parts–Black, lesbian, and woman. Some individuals may rank their identities separately, seeing themselves as Black first, woman second, lesbian third, or some other permutation of the three; others see their identities as inextricably interwoven.

=== Gender roles and presentation ===
The gender relations perspective is a sociological theory which proposes that gender is not just a state of being but rather a system of behavior created through interactions with others, generally to fill various necessary social roles. Same-sex-attracted individuals are just as impacted by the societally reinforced need for these "gendered" roles as heterosexuals are. Within Black lesbian communities, gender presentation is often used to indicate the role an individual can be expected to take in a relationship, though many may also simply prefer the presentation for its own sake, assigning less significance to its association with certain behaviors or traits. According to sociologist Mignon Moore, because Black lesbians generally existed "outside" of the predominantly white feminist movement of the 1960s and 70s, the community was less affected by the non-Black lesbian community's increased emphasis on androgyne as a rejection of "heterosexual" gender norms.

Instead, they adapted the existing butch/femme dichotomy to form three main categories:

- The terms stud or aggressive (AG) was used to refer to more masculine-presenting lesbians. Stud fashion is generally more in-line with trends popular among Black men, rather than the styles typical to non-Black butches.
- Individuals now commonly called stems – whom Moore referred to as "gender blenders" – differed from androgynous lesbians by combining aspects of both masculinity and femininity instead of de-emphasizing them.
- Black fems were generally more consistent with white femmes in their feminine expression, though in the modern day, their styles also often align more with the fashion of other Black women.

== Health disparities ==
Black LGBTQ individuals face many health risks due to discriminatory policies and behaviors in medicine. Due to lack of medical coverage and adequate medical treatment, many are faced with heath risks. There is no current legislation fully protecting LGBTQ individuals from discrimination in the public sphere concerning health care. President Barack Obama wrote a memo to the Department of Health and Human Services to enact regulations on discrimination of gay and transgender individuals receiving Medicare and Medicaid, as well as to permit full hospital visitation rights to same-sex couples and their families. The United States of Housing and Urban Development proposed policies that would allow access and eligibility to core programs regardless of sexual orientation and gender identity. The Affordable Care Act (ACA) is currently working to be inclusive, as courts have recently passed interpretation of the ACA to prohibit discrimination against transgender individuals and gender non-conforming persons.

=== HIV/AIDS ===
One of the major concerns in the Black LGBTQ community are the high rates of sexually transmitted diseases (STDs), and the most concerning STD impacting the Black LGBTQ community is HIV/AIDS. In 2016, the Centers for Disease Control and Prevention (CDC) predicted 50% of Black LGBTQ men will contract HIV in their lifetime primarily due to condomless anal sex which was the highest predicted rate among any racial group of men. In 2024, CDC researchers noted a decline in new infections for Black LGBTQ men between 2017 and 2021 so they dropped the lifetime risk to 33% but it is still the highest predicted rate among all men demographic groups. Black people account for 44% of new HIV infections in both adults and adolescents. For Black LGBTQ men, 70% of the population accounts for new HIV infections for both adults and adolescents. The rates of HIV for Black LGBTQ men are notably higher than their non-Black counterparts. The high infection rates are caused by a high lack of usage of antiretroviral therapy among Black LGBTQ men.

Black trans women have the highest likelihood of contracting HIV/AIDS in the U.S. In a 2021 CDC study, 62% of Black trans women surveyed had contracted HIV/AIDs which was the highest rate for any demographic group. Black trans women have a high likelihood of contracting HIV/AIDs primarily due to their higher participation in sex work.

Black LGBTQ people are more likely to experience housing instability than the general population which increases their risk of contracting HIV/AIDS. Black LGBTQ people experiencing housing instability are less likely to use condoms, get tested, or take HIV medications. Also they are at higher risk for rape due to housing instability. Black trans women have the highest rates of housing instability with an estimated 40% experiencing it in their lifetime.

As of 2024, Black LGBTQ men are six times more likely than non-Black LGBTQ men to die from HIV-related complications. The South is the region with the highest fatality rate for Black LGBTQ men with HIV. The South is also the region with the highest concentration of openly Black LGBTQ people in the U.S.

There are several prominent HIV/AIDs treatment and prevention programs that focuses on helping and educating Black LGBTQ people.

=== Mental health ===
Black LGBTQ individuals are disproportionately affected by mental illness compared to other LGBTQ people. Black LGBTQ individuals are also more likely to experience poor mental health than Black heterosexual people. Although researchers have stated a need for more research in this area, several studies have shown links between the minority stress that comes from belonging to these two marginalized groups and mental illnesses such as anxiety or depression.

Black LGBTQ self-identified people are more likely to be unemployed, have a lower annual income, struggle with food and housing insecurities, and lack proper healthcare than Blacks living a heterosexual lifestyle. These factors are major reasons for stronger mental health issues among Black LGBTQ people.

Black LGBTQ people diagnosed with HIV often struggle with mental health at higher rates. The social and political stigmas associated with HIV and the medical process to manage the virus can usually feel overwhelming and depressing.

Furthermore, this occurs for reasons such as difficulty navigating their communities and similarly a lack of acceptance. Research tends to show that the less social support Black LGBTQ individuals receive, the higher chance that they will report symptoms of depression. Additionally, LGB Black people reported higher rates of "suicidal ideation, suicide planning and substance use than Black heterosexual participants." These trends were observed even stronger for emerging adults in the Black LGBTQ community, as they have to cope with the stress of adulthood along with their sexual and racial identity. Research also suggests a link between general and cyber based victimisation in these low mental health outcomes for young Black LGBTQ people.

In addition to being disproportionately affected by mental illnesses, Black LGBTQ people were among the least likely to pursue mental health services. This was due to multiple factors such as care providers' lack of proficiency in treating patients with sexual identity and racial identity struggles. Due to these disparities being rooted in systematic racism, large-scale structural and systematic interventions are needed to address these poor mental health outcomes.

== Depiction in popular culture ==
African-American LGBTQ culture has been depicted in films such as Patrick Ian Polk's Noah's Arc and Punks, Dee Rees' Pariah, and Barry Jenkins' Moonlight, which not only has the main character as a gay African-American but is written by an African American and is based on a play by Black gay playwright Tarell Alvin McCraney.

Queen Sugar, a critically acclaimed show about the Black experience in America that ran from 2016 to 2022, depicted several Black LGBTQ characters, including one of the first trans male characters to be played by a transgender actor on television.

In 2018, the critically acclaimed TV show Pose premiered. It was the first show on a mainstream channel to feature a cast composed predominantly of LGBTQ people of color.

== Notable people ==
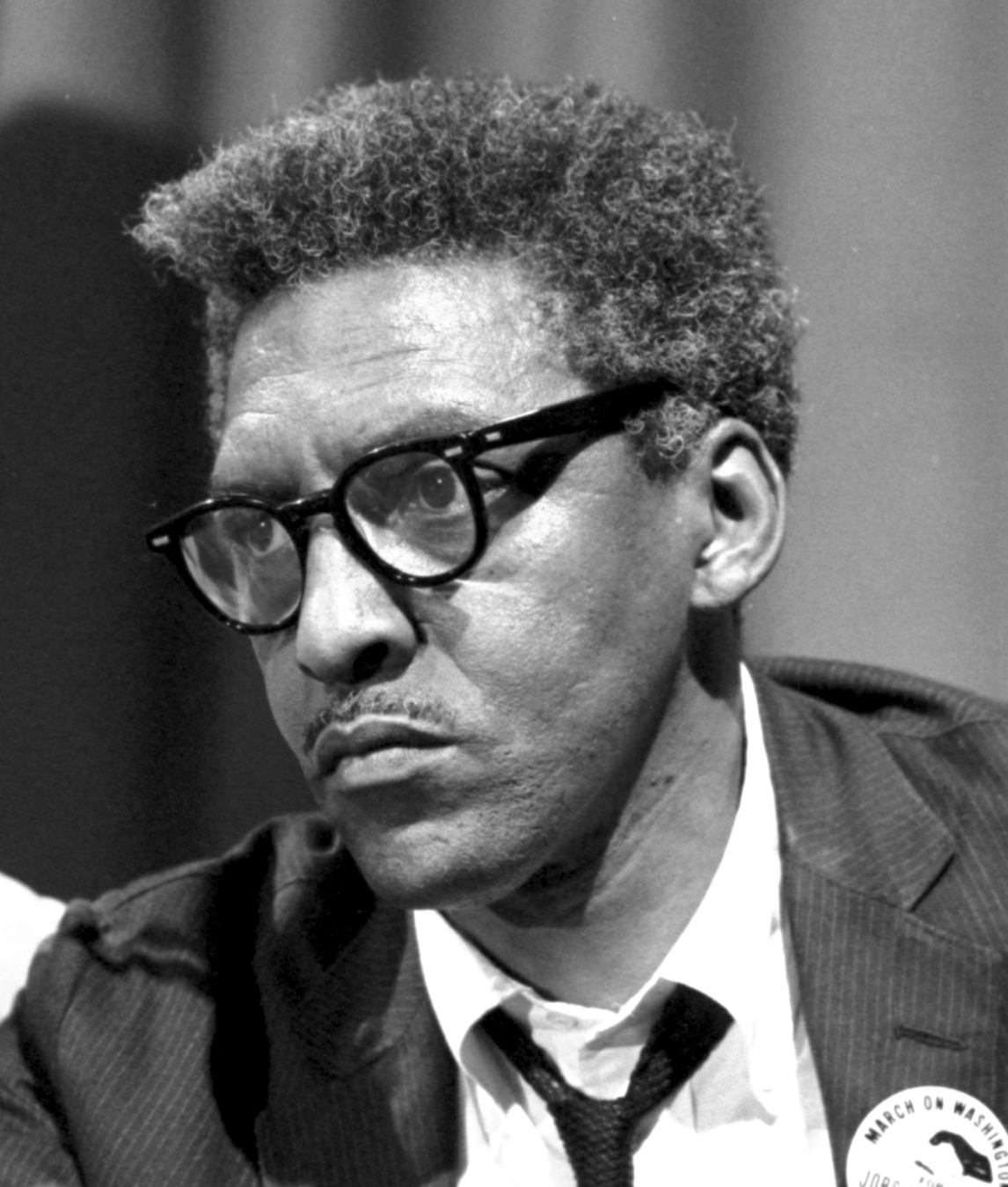
Bayard Rustin

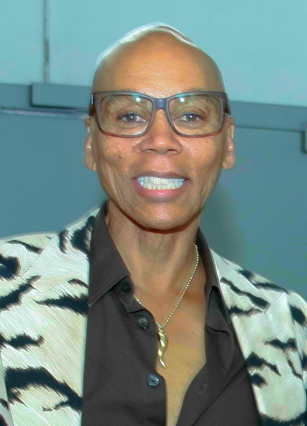
Rupaul

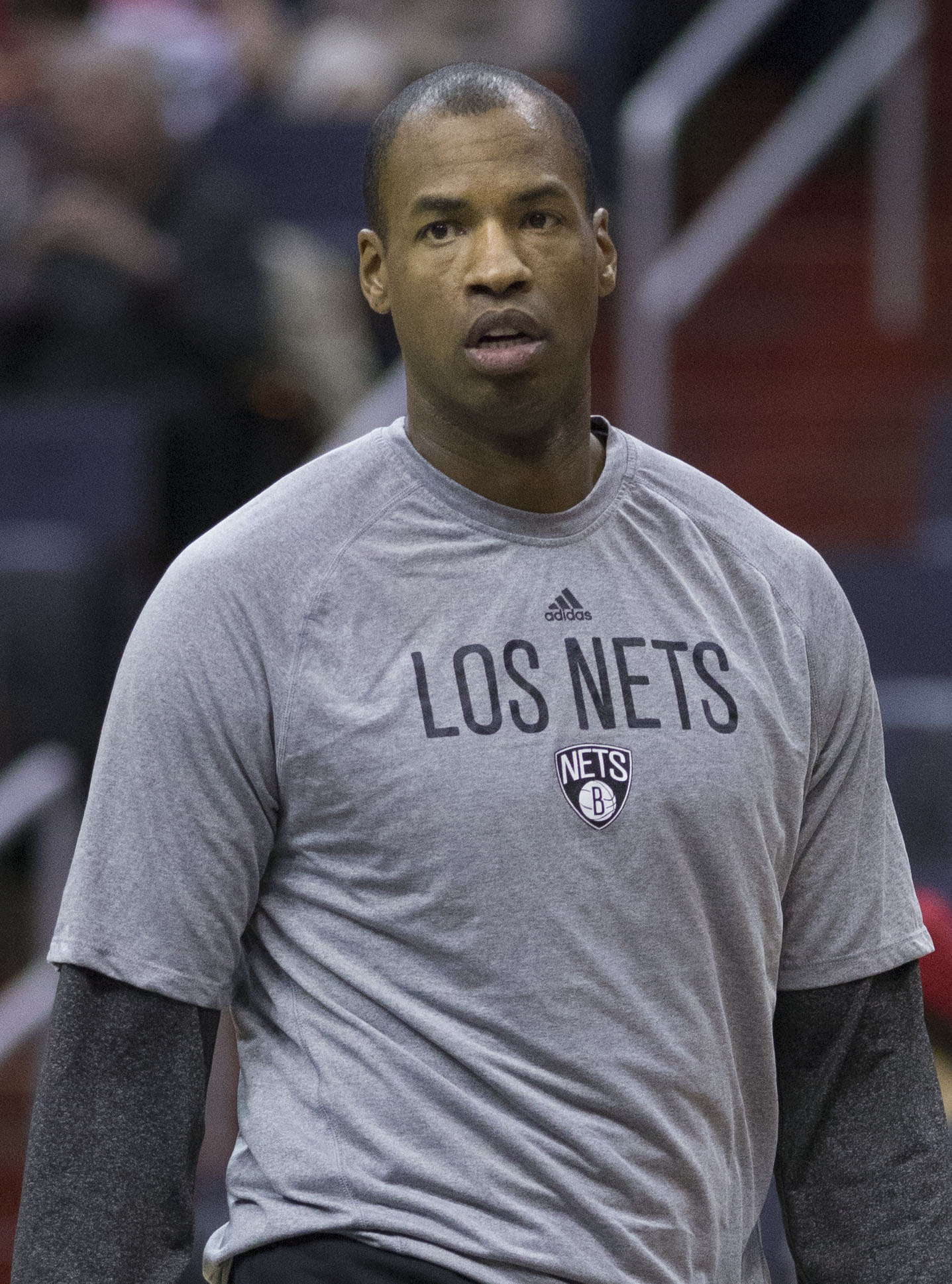
Jason Collins

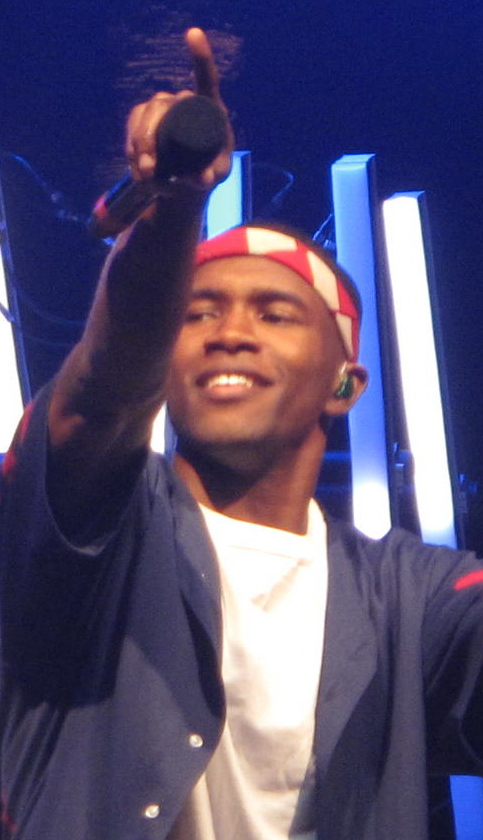
Frank Ocean

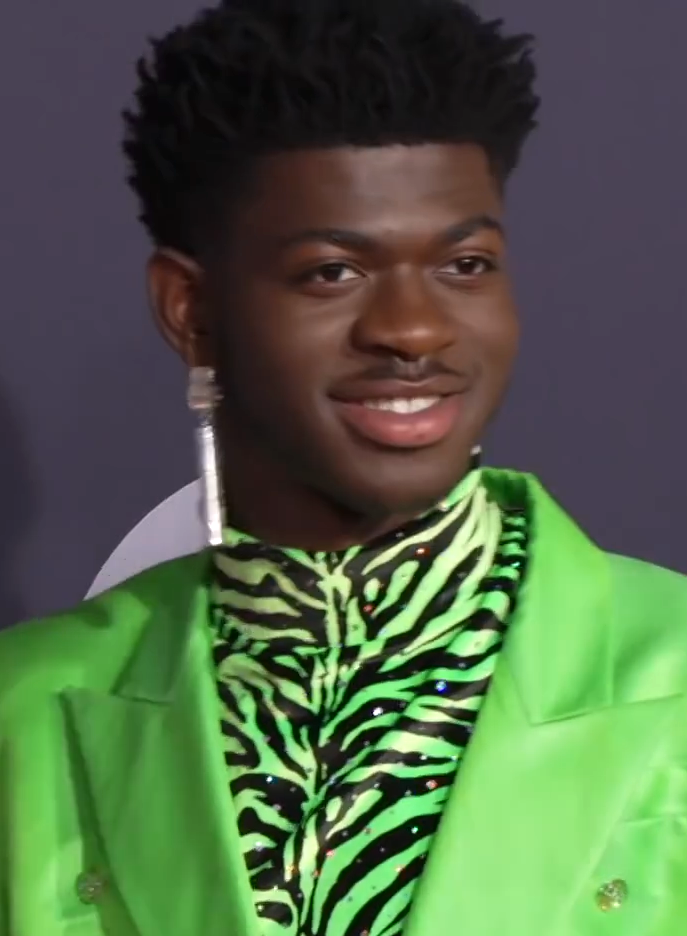
Lil Nas X

=== Gay and bisexual men ===
- August Alsina
- Lee Daniels
- Khalid
- Jonathan Capehart
- Tramell Tillman
- DeRay McKesson
- Tevin Campbell
- Bebe Zahara Benet
- Colman Domingo
- Isaiah Rashad
- Taylor Bennett
- E. Lynn Harris
- Durand Bernarr
- Bayard Rustin
- Glenn Burke
- Johnny Mathis
- Keith Boykin
- Darrin P. Gayles
- Countee Cullen
- Ryan Jamaal Swain
- Ritchie Torres
- Langston Hughes
- J. August Richards
- Wilson Cruz
- Alvin Ailey
- Larry Levan
- Frankie Knuckles
- Tony Humphries
- Billy Porter
- Karamo Brown
- Mel Tomlinson
- Clark Moore
- Jason Collins
- Michael Sam
- Jussie Smollett
- Yazz the Greatest
- iLoveMakonnen
- Sean Bankhead
- John Ameachi
- James Baldwin
- Paris Barclay
- Charles M. Blow
- Jericho Brown
- Eugene Daniels
- Terrance Dean
- Anye Elite
- Willi Smith
- Michael Arceneaux
- David Hampton
- Marcellas Reynolds
- Ryan Russell
- Freddie Pendavis
- LZ Granderson
- Essex Hemphill
- Don Lemon
- Darryl Stephens
- Bruce Nugent
- Saeed Jones
- Tarell Alvin McCraney
- Patrick Ian Polk
- EJ Johnson
- Alain LeRoy Locke
- Frank Ocean
- Destin Conrad
- Marlon Riggs
- Shaun T
- Harrison David Rivers
- RuPaul
- Justin Simien
- Andrew Gillum
- Joshua Johnson
- Daryl Stephens
- Sylvester
- Andrew Leon Talley
- Tyler The Creator
- Lil Nas X
- Wentworth Miller
- Saucy Santana
- Kevin Abstract
- Isaiah Rashad
- Steve Lacy

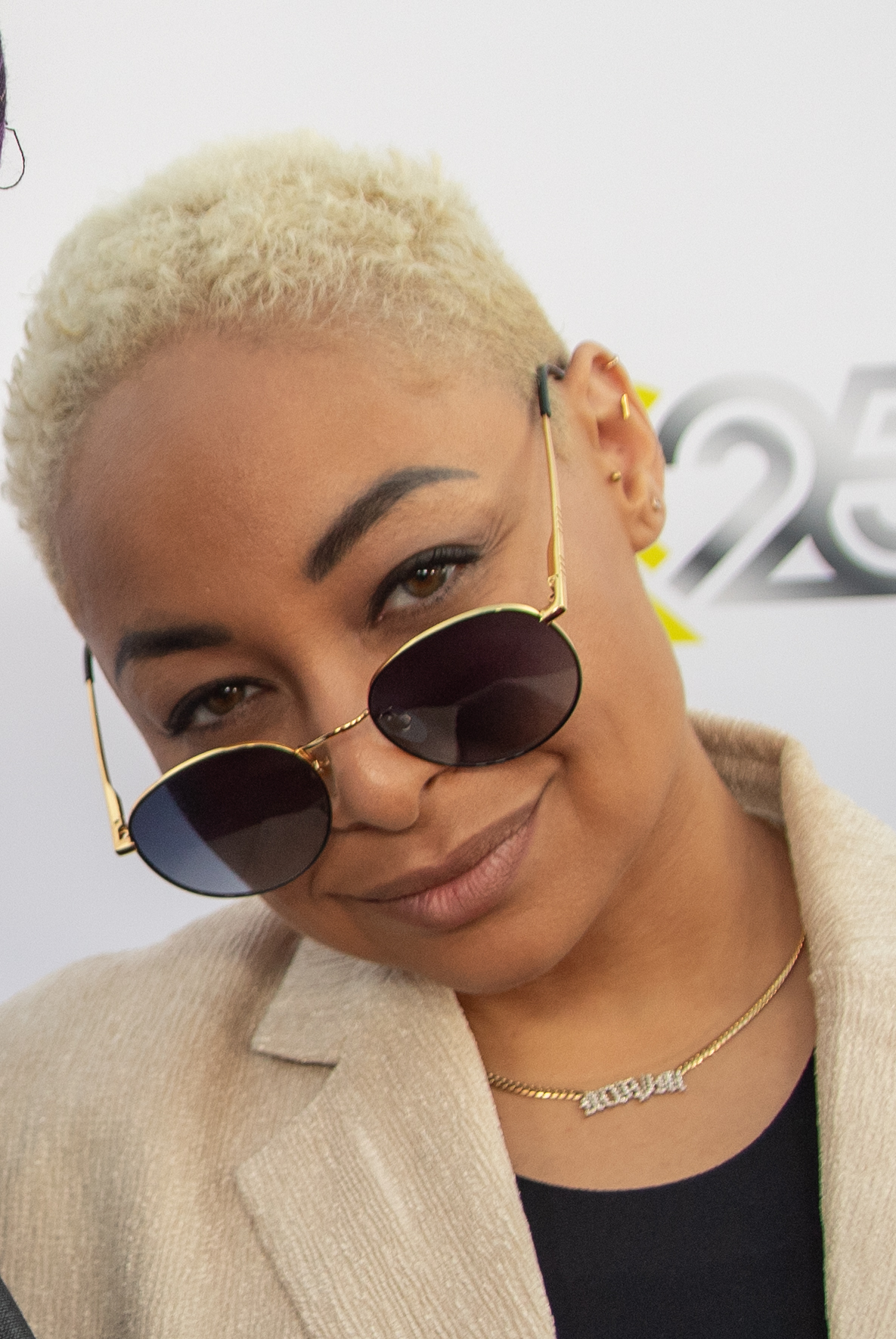
Raven-Symoné

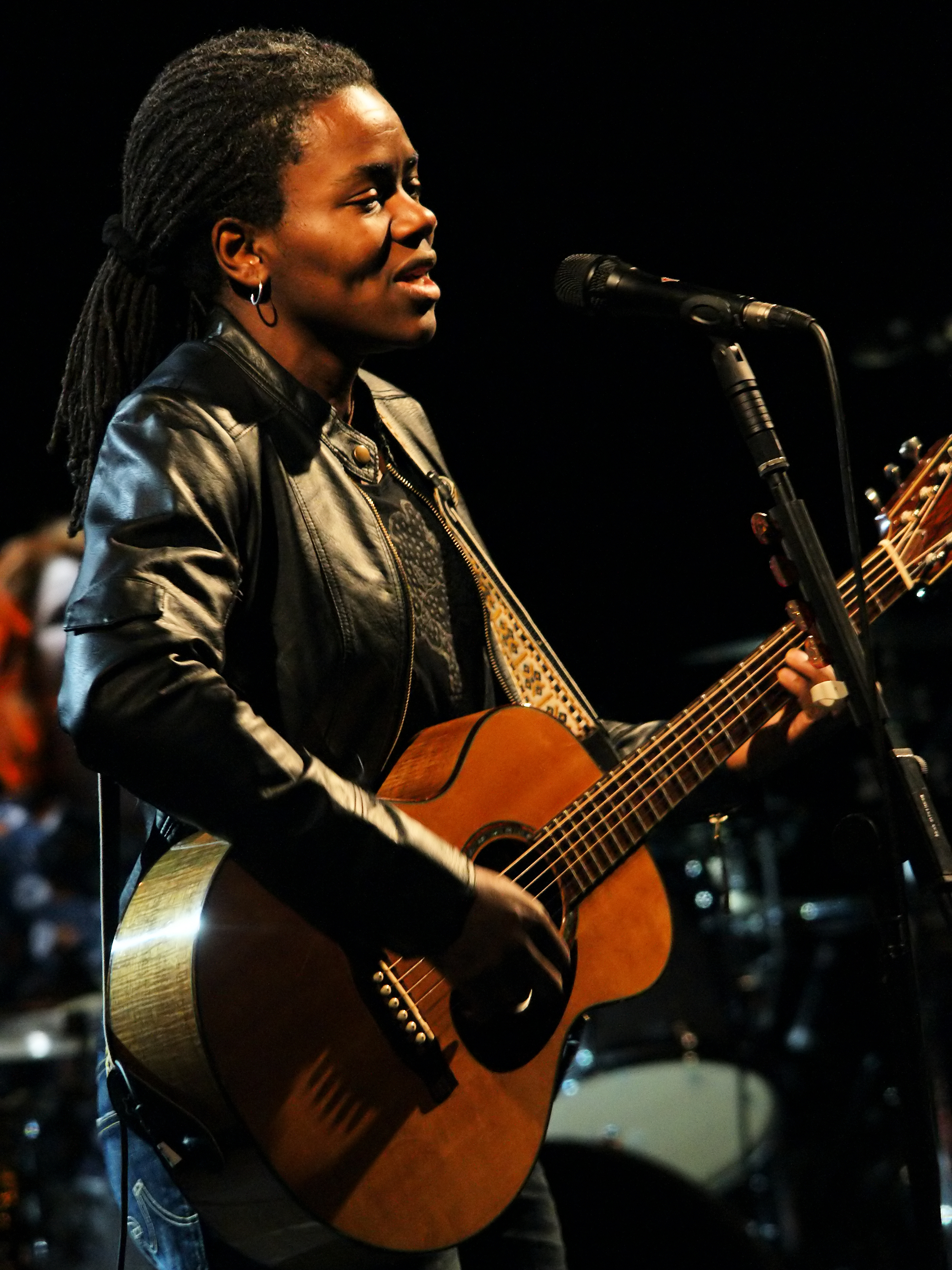
Tracy Chapman

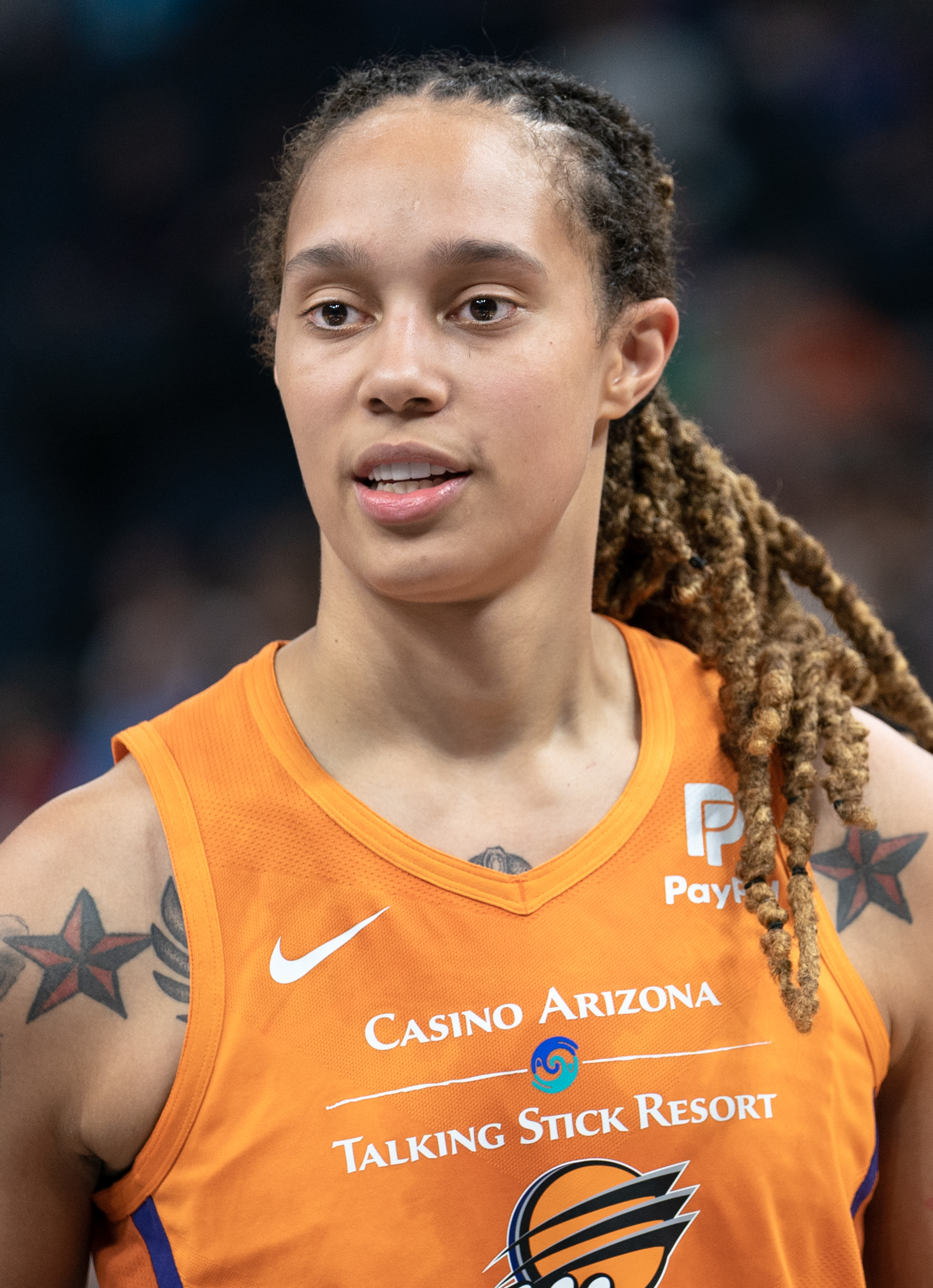
Brittney Griner

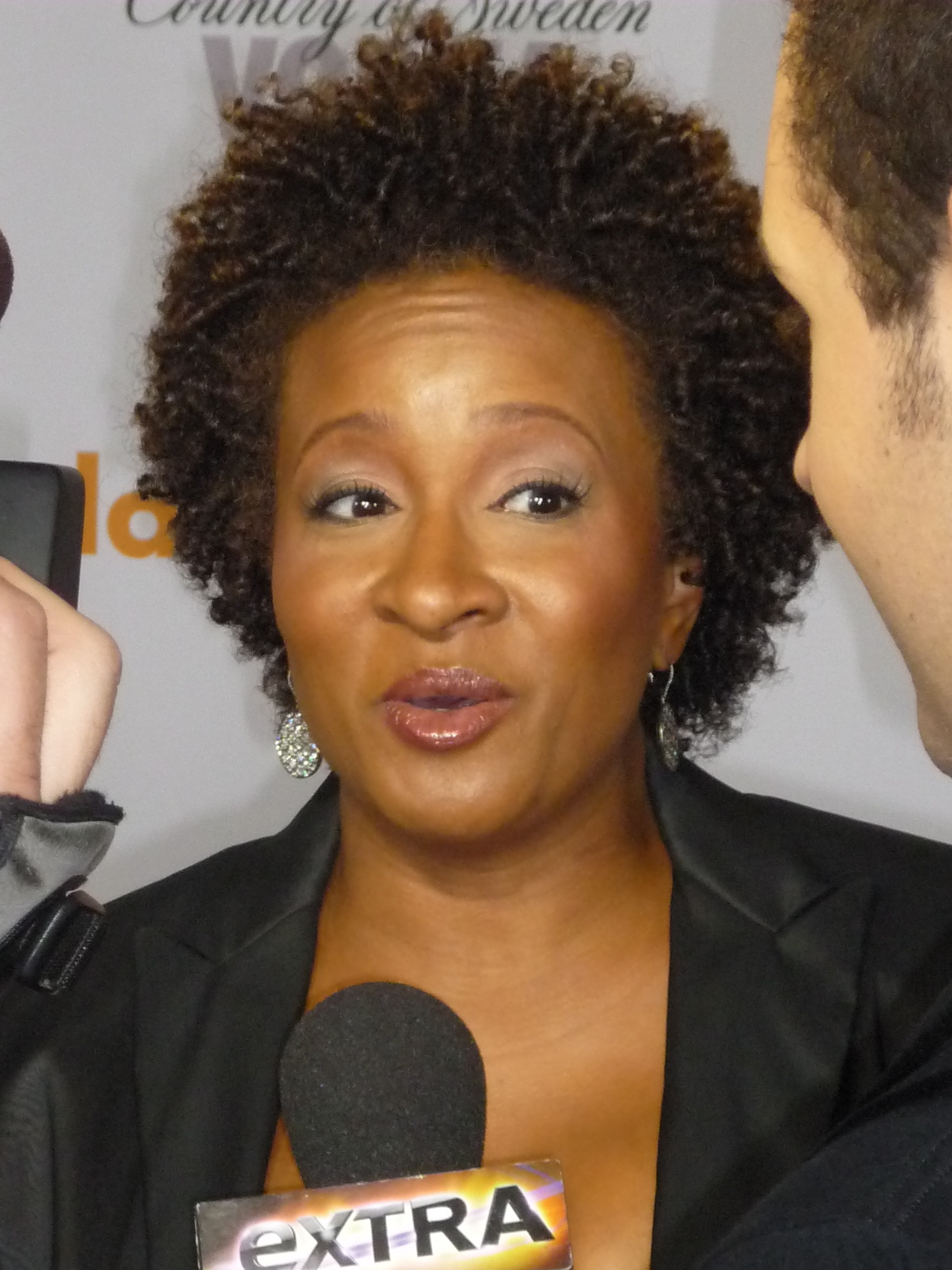
Wanda Sykes

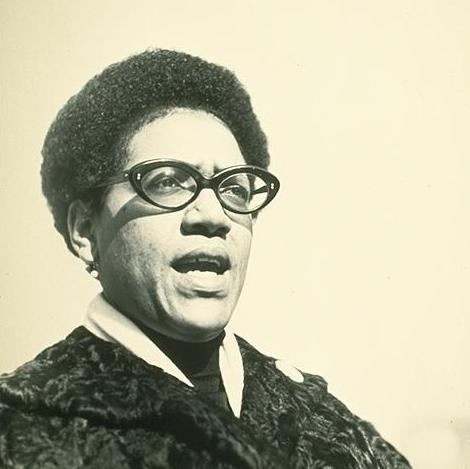
Audre Lorde

=== Lesbian and bisexual women ===
- Queen Latifah
- Keke Palmer
- Victoria Monet
- Kandi Burruss
- Porsha Williams
- K. Michelle
- Doechii
- Yung Miami
- Ariana DeBose
- Candace Parker
- Sha'Carri Richardson
- Niecy Nash
- Deborah Batts
- Dej Loaf
- Miss Cleo
- Lori Lightfoot
- Nikki Giovanni
- Tessa Thompson
- Barbara Jordan
- Willow Smith
- Raven-Symoné
- Tyra Bolling
- Brittney Griner
- Seimone Augustus
- Erica Banks
- Angel McCoughtry
- Samira Wiley
- Young M.A.
- Robin Roberts
- Barbara Jordan
- E. Denise Simmons
- Da Brat
- Karine Jean-Pierre
- Josephine Baker
- Laphonza Butler
- Octavia Butler
- Gladys Bentley
- Angela Davis
- Lorraine Hansberry
- Mabel Hampton
- Audre Lorde
- Meshell Ndegeocello
- Ma Rainey
- Monifah
- Moms Mabley
- Wanda Sykes
- Lena Waithe
- Rebecca Walker
- Nell Carter
- Ethel Waters
- Alice Walker
- Tracy Chapman
- Mimi Faust
- Bessie Smith
- Janelle Monáe
- Kehlani
- Alice Dunbar Nelson
- Azealia Banks
- Halsey (singer)
- Megan Thee Stallion
- Cardi B
- Angel Haze
- Amandla Stenberg
- Felicia Pearson
- Doja Cat
- Lakeyah
- Ice Spice

=== Pansexual ===
- Janelle Monáe
- Bob the Drag Queen
- Angel Haze
- Wayne Brady

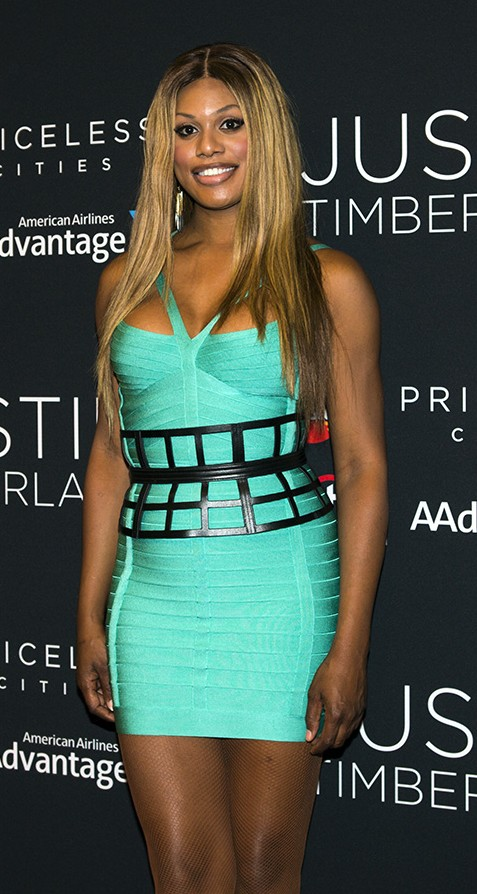
Laverne Cox

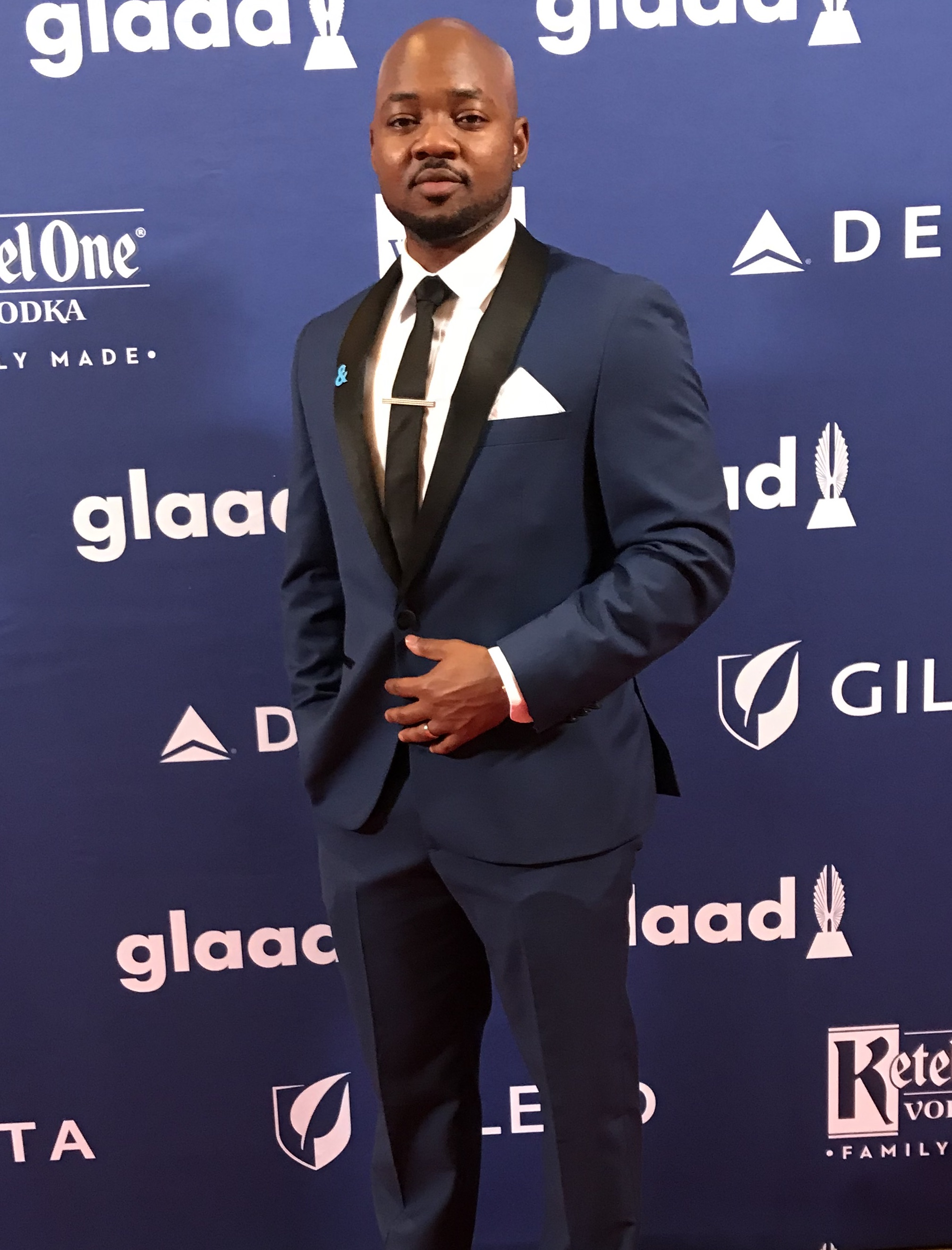
Brian Michael Smith

=== Transgender ===
- Amiyah Scott
- Angelica Ross
- Dominique Jackson
- Patricio Manuel
- Kye Allums
- Laverne Cox
- Ts Madison
- Sir Lady Java
- Isis King
- CeCe McDonald
- Janet Mock
- Kortney Ryan Ziegler
- MJ Rodriguez
- Mykki Blanco
- Brian Michael Smith
- Kat Blaque
- Nahshon Dion

=== Gender non-conforming ===
- Ryann Holmes
- Marsha P. Johnson
- Saucy Santana
- Pauli Murray

== Some first African-American LGBTQ holders of political offices in the United States ==
=== State legislature (partial list) ===
==== Rhode Island ====
1. Gordon Fox (D)
  - 1st gay African-American member of the Rhode Island General Assembly
  - 1st gay African-American Speaker of the Rhode Island House of Representatives
  - 1st gay African-American member of the Rhode Island House of Representatives from the 4th and 5th district

==== Georgia ====
1. Rashad Taylor (D)
  - 1st gay African-American member of the Georgia General Assembly
  - 1st gay African-American member of the Georgia House of Representatives from the 55th district

==== Massachusetts ====
1. Althea Garrison (R)
  - 1st transgender woman African American member of the Massachusetts General Court
  - 1st transgender woman African American of the Massachusetts House of Representatives from the 5th Suffolk District

==== Nevada ====
1. Pat Spearman (D)
  - 1st lesbian African American member of the Nevada Legislature and 1st lesbian African American member of the Nevada Senate from the 1st district

==== North Carolina ====
1. Marcus Brandon (D)
  - 1st gay African-American member of the North Carolina General Assembly and 1st gay African-American member of the North Carolina House of Representatives from the 60th district

==== Texas ====
1. Barbara Jordan
  - 1st African American woman to serve in the Texas House of Representatives (1966)

=== Mayoral ===
==== California ====
1. Ron Oden (D)
  - 1st gay African-American United States mayor and 1st gay African American mayor of Palm Springs, California

==== New Jersey ====
1. Bruce Harris (R)
  - 1st gay African-American mayor of Chatham Borough, New Jersey

=== Legislative ===
==== New York ====
1. Keith St. John (D)
  - 1st gay African-American public office holder
  - 1st gay African-American member of the Albany Common Council Alderman of the 2nd ward

=== Judicial ===
==== Federal ====
1. Darrin P. Gayles (D)
  - 1st gay African-American male United States federal judge
  - 1st gay African-American United States District Court for the Southern District of Florida

== Works ==
- Black is... Black Ain't
- Paris Is Burning
- How Do I Look
- Mississippi Damned

== See also ==
- House music
- J-Setting
- Homophobia in ethnic minority communities
- Racism in the LGBT community
- Timeline of African and diasporic LGBT history
- Black lesbian literature
- UK Black Pride
- Down-low (sexual slang)
- Media and LGBT youth of colour in the United States
- Queer culture in the Southern United States
- Black mecca
- Lesbian bars
- Gay bars

General information:

- LGBTQ people in the United States
