= Ryann Holmes =

American consultant and co-founder of bklyn boihood

- Born: Ryann Makenzi Holmes; 1984 (age 41–42); Washington, D.C.
- Education: Baruch College (MBA)
- Years active: 2009-present
- Known for: bklyn boihood co-founder

Ryann Holmes (born 1984) is an American consultant and the co-founder of bklyn boihood, a collective that empowers "masculine of center bois, lesbians, queers, trans-identified studs, doms, butches and AGs of color". Holmes' work has been recognized by Brooklyn Magazine, the Brooklyn Community Pride Center, and in a short documentary film, Portrait of Ryann Holmes.

== Early life and education ==
Holmes was born in Washington, D.C. in 1984 and raised in Maryland. They stated in an interview that growing up, they experienced rigid standards surrounding gender presentation that did not allow room for fluidity. They are non-binary and use they/them pronouns. Holmes moved to Brooklyn in 2006. They hold an MBA in social entrepreneurship from Baruch College.

== Career ==
Holmes worked as the director of community programs at the MoCADA from 2012–2015. In 2016, Holmes was featured in a short film called Portrait of Ryann Holmes, produced by Chanelle Aponte Pearson.

=== bklyn boihood ===
Holmes founded bklyn boihood in 2009 with close friend Genesis Tremaine after a conversation on the lack of masculine of center representation in queer and organizing spaces and media. The collective developed a 2010-2011 calendar with pictures of masculine of center bois of color and has since been produced annually. bklyn boihood regularly hosts queer-centered parties, and holds workshops on accountability, femmephobia, and developing healthy masculinity. In 2015, the collective released an anthology series called Outside the XY: Brown Queer Masculinity, written by masculine of center queer people and transgender men of color.

== Accolades ==
- 100 Most Influential People in Brooklyn Culture, Brooklyn Magazine, 2016
- Community Leadership Award, Brooklyn Community Pride Center, 2019

== See also ==
- Transmasculine
- African-American LGBT community
- Gender diversity
