= Media and LGBTQ youth of colour in the United States =

In the United States, LGBT youth of colour are marginalized adolescents in the LGBT community. Social issues include homelessness; cyberbullying; physical, verbal and sexual abuse; suicide; drug addiction; street violence; immigration surveillance; engagement in high-risk sexual activity; self-harm, and depression. The rights of LGBT youth of colour are reportedly not addressed in discussions of sexuality and race in the larger context of LGBT rights.

Specific issues primarily stem from the framework of intersectionality. LGBT youth of colour may experience sexism, homophobia, transphobia, racism, heterosexism, white supremacy or poverty, sometimes simultaneously. Concerns for marginalized individuals in an already-marginalized community include intercultural competence, the school-to-prison pipeline, and school expulsions.

Activities aimed at providing safe spaces and support for LGBT youth of colour activities are generally held in libraries, schools, non-profit agencies and designated community spaces. These activities, which provide practical sex education, mental-health support, empowerment and positive role models, usually require state funding as HIV/AIDS prevention.

== Bullying ==
LGBT youth are two times more likely to be involved in cyberbullying and face to face bullying encounters, than youth who do not identify with the LGBT community. Bullying takes a toll on youth lower self-esteem, and lower GPA's have been reported effects of LGBT youth subjected to such encounters. Bullying that LGBT youth have reported being involved in include but are not limited to physical, verbal, relational, and sexual forms. For youth that come out and identify themselves within the LGBT community lose their sense of safety within their schools and homes. It is not unusual for LGBT youth of color to lose friends or be bullied. Several youth who are a part of the LGBT community have reported having suicidal thoughts and actions as a result of bullying (online or in person). Within the United States there is anti-bullying legislation, however, no anti-bullying law. This means that bullying within schools is not illegal. In many cases bullying is also referred to as harassment on various levels. By participating in the act harassment you are breaking a federal law. Counselors work to defend LGBT youth on a day-to-day basis, with no concrete legislation to back them up to make major changes within bullied children's lives. There is limited support offered to the LGBT students of colour.

== Activism through media ==
The rise of activism within our society today has become incredibly prevalent through various media platforms. Social movements that are primarily based, or heavily advertise themselves through media are proven to reach a greater amount of youth. This increased connection with youth results in greater organizational involvement, as youth are quite active on social media.

Theater, drag shows and street theater have been used as resources for queer communities in response to LGBT rights, such as during the AIDS crisis in the United States during the 1980s and 1990s. The 1980s and 1990s HIV/AIDS crisis demonstrated how queer activism and intersectional voices are a vital aspect of society, culture, social movements, and the shaping of history. LGBT youth of colour have been using performances to tell their stories, in addition to social media, video production, blogging, and podcasting.

== Media initiatives ==
There has been an increase in media initiatives to include youth who identify as members of the LGBT community. Many platforms have channels which can be considered safe or welcoming for LGBT youth of colour.

=== Hashtags ===
The hashtag #morecolormorepride celebrates the addition of brown and black stripes, changing the rainbow flag designed by Gilbert Baler. The stripes were added to make the LGBT community more inclusive and advocate against racial discrimination.

Philadelphia City Hall pride flag

The hashtag #VisibleMe was created to highlight stories from LGBT youth worldwide. The hashtag was used by a diverse community on a number of platforms, including Instagram, Facebook, Twitter and YouTube. Many young teens shared their stories and created an Instagram channel. Movements such as the #40toNoneDay raised awareness regarding youth-of-color homelessness, particularly in the LGBT community. Sara Ramirez, who plays a bisexual doctor on Grey’s Anatomy, advocates the movement to bring attention to the 40 percent of homeless youth who identify as part of the LGBT community; LGBT youth are less than seven percent of the general youth population.

The hashtag #BlackLivesMatter started as a social media movement that was created after the murder of 17 year old Trayvon Martin. The movement is unique due to its compelling efforts to incorporate the intersection of both race and sexuality, often applying a queer framework to an issue surrounding blackness. The social media hashtag turned historical activist movement centers around anti-black racism while simultaneously challenging societal norms of blackness and queerness, straying from the attitude of ‘were all in this together’ which is framed heavily by whiteness. This social media movement exemplifies how social media movements can transition into grander in-person action that greatly influence societies discourse surrounding intersectionality.

=== Blogs ===
Representations of, and expressions by, LGBT youth of colour can be found in blog posts. Author and transgender activist Janet Mock began blogging in 2010, and writes about gender, race and representation. Mock was named as one of Time magazine's 30 most influential people on the Internet. Her blog has a number of posts relevant to teens, ranging from bullying to the phenomenon known as Black Girl Magic.

Black Girl Dangerous, a social-justice blog written from a QTPoC perspective, was begun by Mia McKenzie in 2011. The blog has featured over 300 queer and transgender writers who have contributed their voices to topics like the queer male gaming experience. With over seven million readers, Black Girl Dangerous ended its online publication on July 31, 2017.

The social-networking site Tumblr has a number of blogs geared towards LGBT youth of colour, including Fuck Yeah Queer People of Color and LGBT + PoC. The blogs provide a space for LGBT youth of colour to contact other LGBT PoC youth.

=== Podcasts ===
With the rise in popularity of podcasts, the LGBT-of-colour community has connected with one another and discussed the triumphs and issues they face. In Louisville, Kentucky, Kaila Story and Jaison Gardner (two black members of the LGBT community) discuss a variety of topics weekly on their Strange Fruit podcast. Some, such as “politics, pop culture, and black gay life", appeal to many youth. Nia King produces the podcast We Want the Airwaves, which focuses on queer and transgender people of colour (particularly artists). In an interview, King focused on fighting oppression of this marginalized group and raising awareness of queer and transgender artists of colour. The Trans Youth Equality Foundation funds a podcast, TransWaves, which emphasizes education, advocacy and support for transgender youth and their families. Focusing on popularizing the trans-child movement, the podcast has interviews and anonymous advice for listeners.

=== Advocates for Youth ===
Advocates for Youth, an online activism and resource portal for all youth, emphasizes initiatives for LGBT youth. One of its segments is Youth Resource, a website "created by and for gay, lesbian, transgender, and questioning young people" which encourages online peer educators to create an inclusive space. One of the most successful features of Youth Resource has been MyStoryOutLoud, a digital storytelling campaign for LGBT youth of colour to use technology to allow their voices to be heard and raise awareness of the need for safe spaces in communities. Using platforms such as Tumblr, Twitter and Instagram, LGBT people of color can highlight their experiences in video or written narratives or other forms of art (including poetry and pictures). Another resource, Amplify (sponsored by Advocates for Youth) is an "online youth activism hub." Advocates for Youth also has a cultural advocacy and mobilization initiative to empower youth through leadership training and encourage them to educate the community about safe spaces.

== Media impact ==
Studies of racism, hetero- and homonormativity and positive role models for queer youth in media indicate that the lack of LGBT people of colour in media can affect LGBT youth of colour in coming out and their psychological development.

According to the northwestern journal of law and social policy homelessness has risen over the years in the U.S., and homelessness has been addressed providing services and programs to help homelessness youth, however, these improvements regarding homelessness have not considered the differences among this population, the LGBT youth of color. According to Alone Without a Home, which reviewed state by state laws affecting unaccompanied youth, one of the biggest reasons for LGBT youth of color homelessness is that when the person decides to open up and say how they feel, their families turn against them and do not accept them; because of this, 20% of the youth have ended up leaving their houses.

Homeless LGBT youth of colour rely on media (such as cellphones) for jobs, Internet access, resisting police harassment and documenting police misconduct.

Media not only allows information to reach individuals faster, it facilitates a collaborative platform for social movements. These collaborative platforms lead to the circulation of the movement's intents and societal objectives, allowing followers and the general public to learn the meanings and backgrounds to the movement. This form of media can create the potential for sed movements to transition beyond social media and create significant societal change at a much quicker rate.

== Notable figures ==
=== Transgender ===
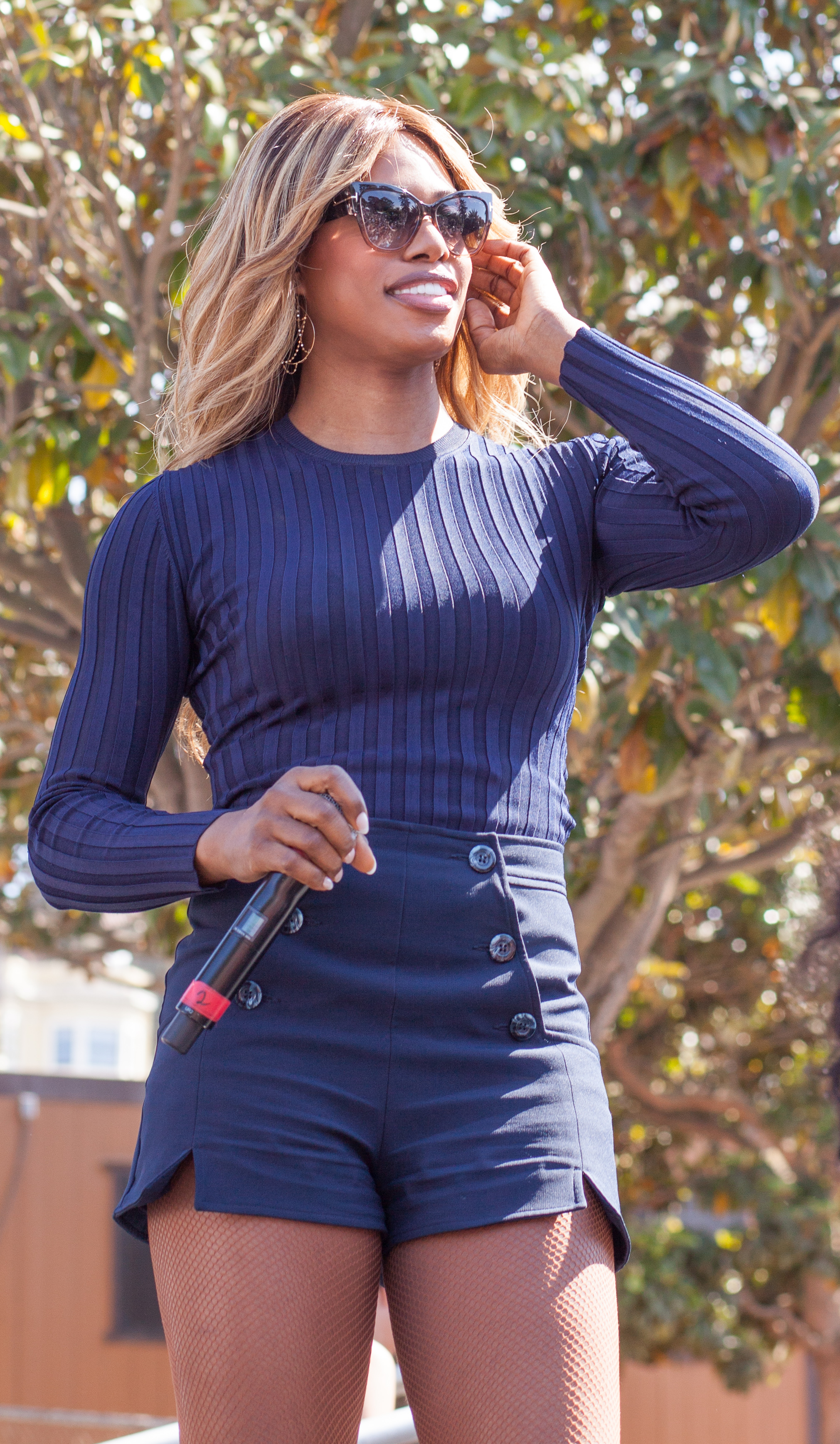
Laverne Cox at the 2015 San Francisco Trans March

Actress Laverne Cox, a black trans woman, has supported trans-youth rights on- and offscreen. With a spot on Time's 100 Most Influential People List and an icon of LGBT History Month, she has used her fame and success to influence policy and increase acceptance. In speaking engagements and a documentary, Cox has created a dialogue for youth of colour and provided support and resources to her young transgender followers. In the midst of building her success, Laverne Cox was the first transgender woman to ever be on the cover of TIME Magazine. Then, most recently on July 10, 2014, she made history once more in the entertainment world when she became the first transgender actress to receive an Emmy nomination.

=== Gay and bisexual men ===
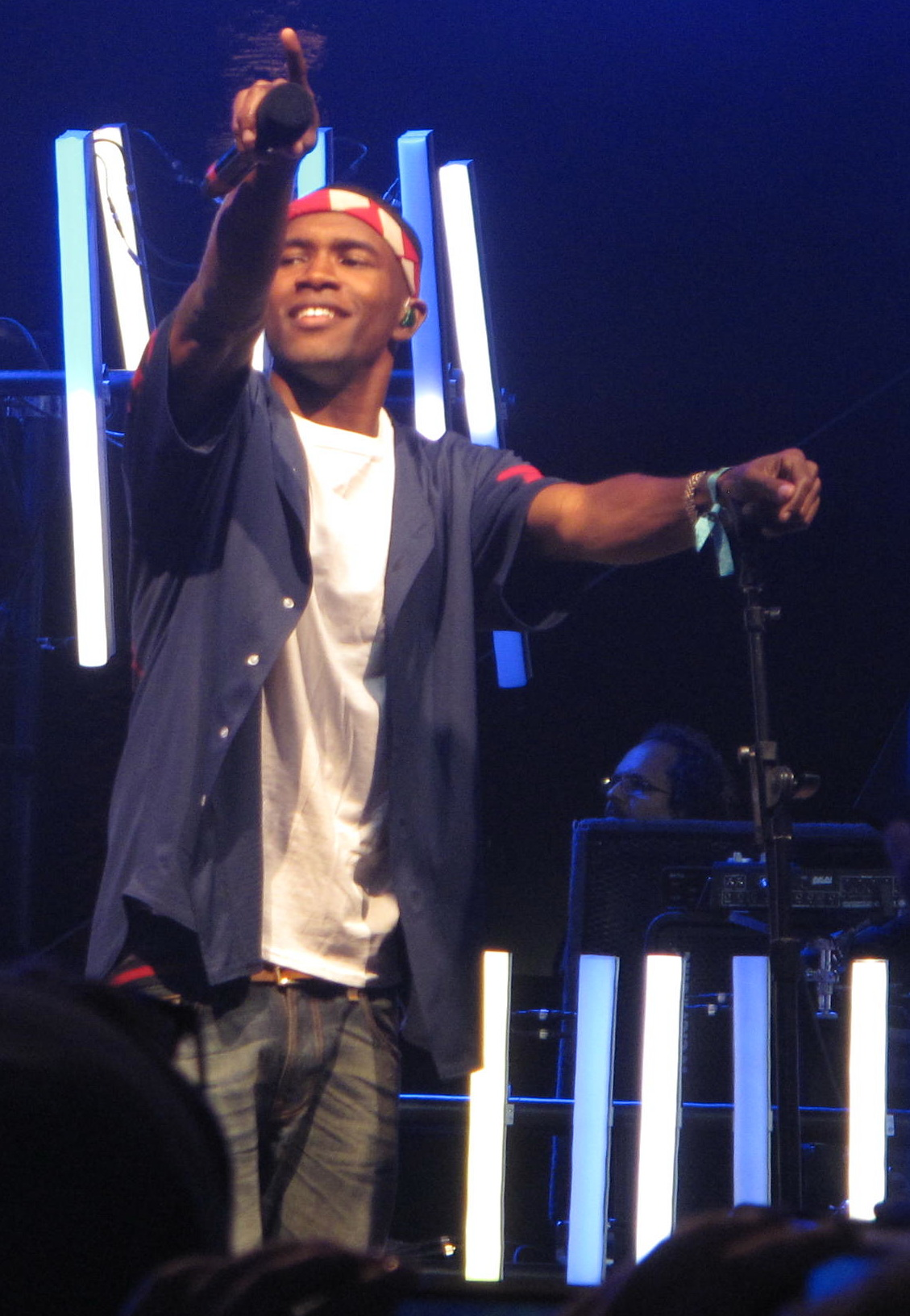
Frank Ocean at Coachella 2012

RuPaul became known for his drag-queen performances, his 1993 single "Supermodel" and the reality-TV RuPaul's Drag Race. On the show other drag queens lip-sync to remain in the competition, and it examines the issues of masculinity, male femininity, living with HIV, recovering from addiction, the transgender community and the fight for marriage equality.

Hip hop singer and songwriter Frank Ocean released his debut studio album, Channel Orange, in 2012. Days before the album's release, Ocean used Tumblr to post an open letter reminiscing about his feelings for another young man.

Channel Orange received critical praise and six Grammy Award nominations. Def Jam Records co-founder Russell Simmons and other music-industry figures voiced support for Ocean. As one of the first openly-gay hip hop artists, he is credited with breaking barriers in hip hop and R&B (which have had a history of homophobia).

== Film and television ==
=== Kiki culture ===
Inspired by New York's underground drag ballroom culture, Kiki is a subculture of the ballroom scene (which is spearheaded by LGBT youth of colour). Less formal than the ballroom scene, it provides a space for LGBT youth of colour to express themselves through performance and allows them to meet other LGBT youth. Kiki culture differs from ballroom culture in its focus on political and social activism, bringing attention to LGBT issues such as homelessness and HIV. It was brought to mainstream media through the documentary, Kiki, written by Sara Jordenö and Twiggy Pucci. The band Scissor Sisters have also helped bring Kiki culture into the mainstream with their song, “Let’s Have a Kiki” which was released in September 2012 and was covered on the Fox television show Glee.

=== Documentaries ===
Laverne Cox’s Emmy-winning documentary, The T Word, focuses on the transgender community. The documentary examines the lives of seven teens and young adults who identify as transgender, sharing their experiences and daily struggles and focusing on campus bullying, attempts to change gender pronouns, family issues, relationships and sex. A second documentary examines the problem of youth homelessness in the LGBT community. About 500,000 youth experience homelessness, and 200,000 identify as part of the LGBT community; over 70 percent of homeless LGBT youth are people of colour. The documentary follows Beniah, Noel, Giovanno, Benjamin, Danielle and Zaykeem over and 18-month period; Noel and Danielle are women.

Jennie Livingston’s award-winning documentary, Paris is Burning, examines closely the drag ball culture of New York City in the 1980s. This documentary interviews members of this community within their family units or houses, which are primarily occupied by gay and trans youth many of who are from the coloured community, or who have been rejected by their families and forced out of their homes. Paris is Burning, allows for youth who identify as LGBT to create an alternate reality out of their own fantasy to escape their personal lives. This film is still used today as a learning tool and resource, for students to see a powerful representation of oneself. Paris is Burning, demonstrates how trauma and struggle can transform into agency of oneself.

=== Characters ===
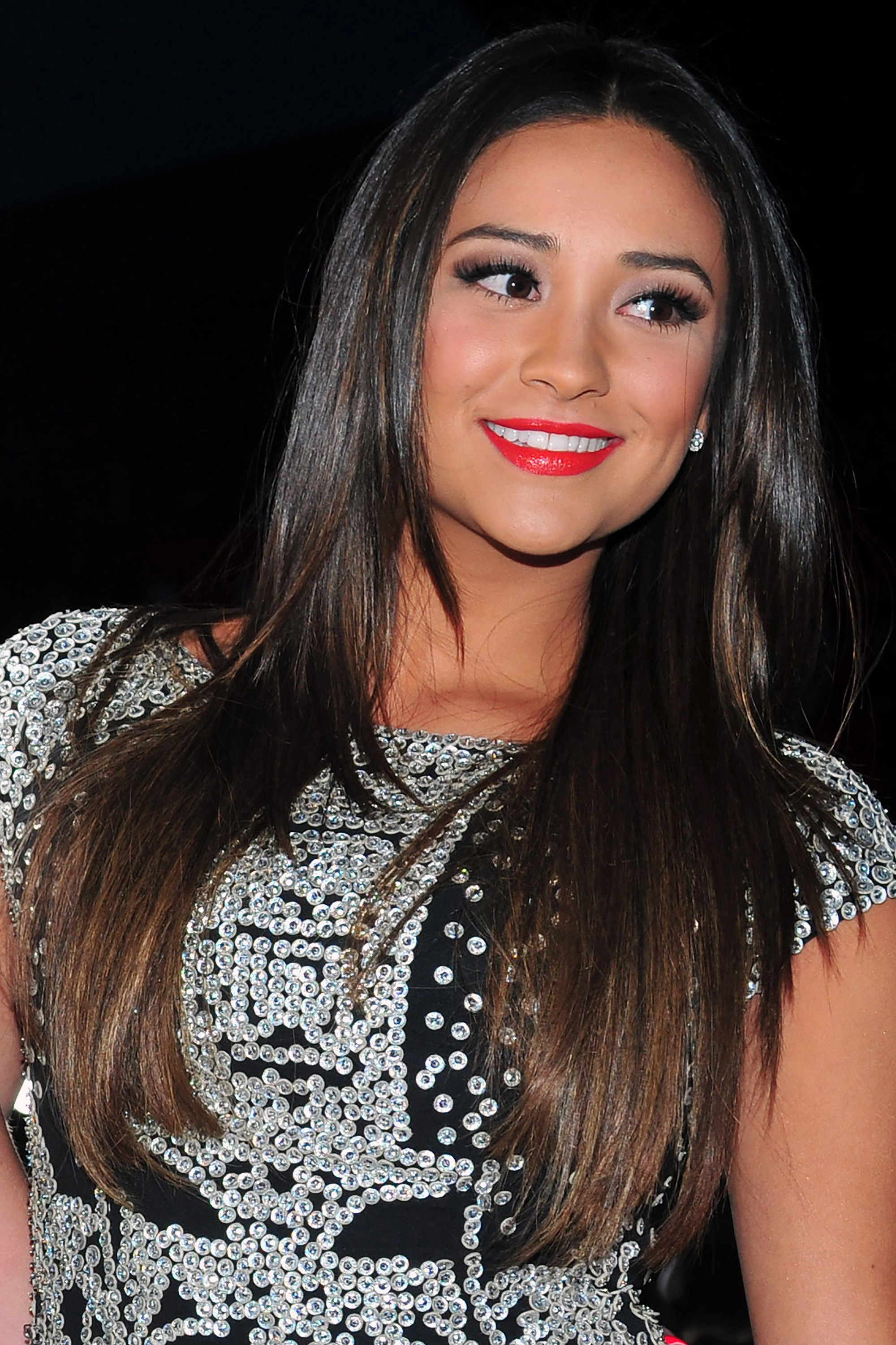
Shay Mitchell plays Emily Fields on the ABC Family series, Pretty Little Liars.

Netflix's Orange Is the New Black includes a number of characters who identify as LGBT or question their sexuality in the penitentiary. Poussey Washington (Samira Wiley) is a black lesbian who was open about her sexuality before her incarceration. During the series, she develops a relationship with Brook Soso (Kimiko Glenn). Although Brook dated men before entering prison, she pursues a relationship with her fellow inmate. Sophia Burset (Laverne Cox) is a trans woman who is harassed and struggles to obtain her necessary hormones.

ABC Family's Pretty Little Liars has a main character—Emily Fields (the multiracial Shay Mitchell)—who is in a relationship with a black lesbian, Maya St. Germain (Bianca Lawson). Emily later becomes engaged to Alison DiLaurentis in the series.

The Netflix series 13 Reasons Why includes the gay Hispanic Tony Padilla (Christian Navarro), a main character and distributor of the tapes. Tony comes out to Clay (the main character) near the end of the season, mentioning a lack of acceptance by his Catholic family, and dates Brad (another character).

Unique Unique Adams (Alex Newell) is a young black trans woman on Fox's musical comedy-drama television series, Glee, which aired from 2009 to 2015. Glee touched on the school's bathroom policy, shedding light on a transgender issue, and Unique offers pivotal support of Coach Beiste after his sex reassignment surgery.

== See also ==
- African-American LGBT community
