= LGBTQ culture in Nashville =

LGBT culture in Nashville consists of the LGBT friendliness, resources, communities, activities for the LGBT community in Nashville and the surrounding areas.

== LGBT-friendly local resources ==
Some longstanding resources include the Nashville Association of Professional People (NAPP) in 1998 and Diversity Builder, Inc. a local resource organization for referrals and LGBTQIA+ training company. NAPP later evolved into the TN Pride Chamber and a member of the National LGBT Chamber of Commerce in 2007. See Certified LGBT Business Enterprise below.

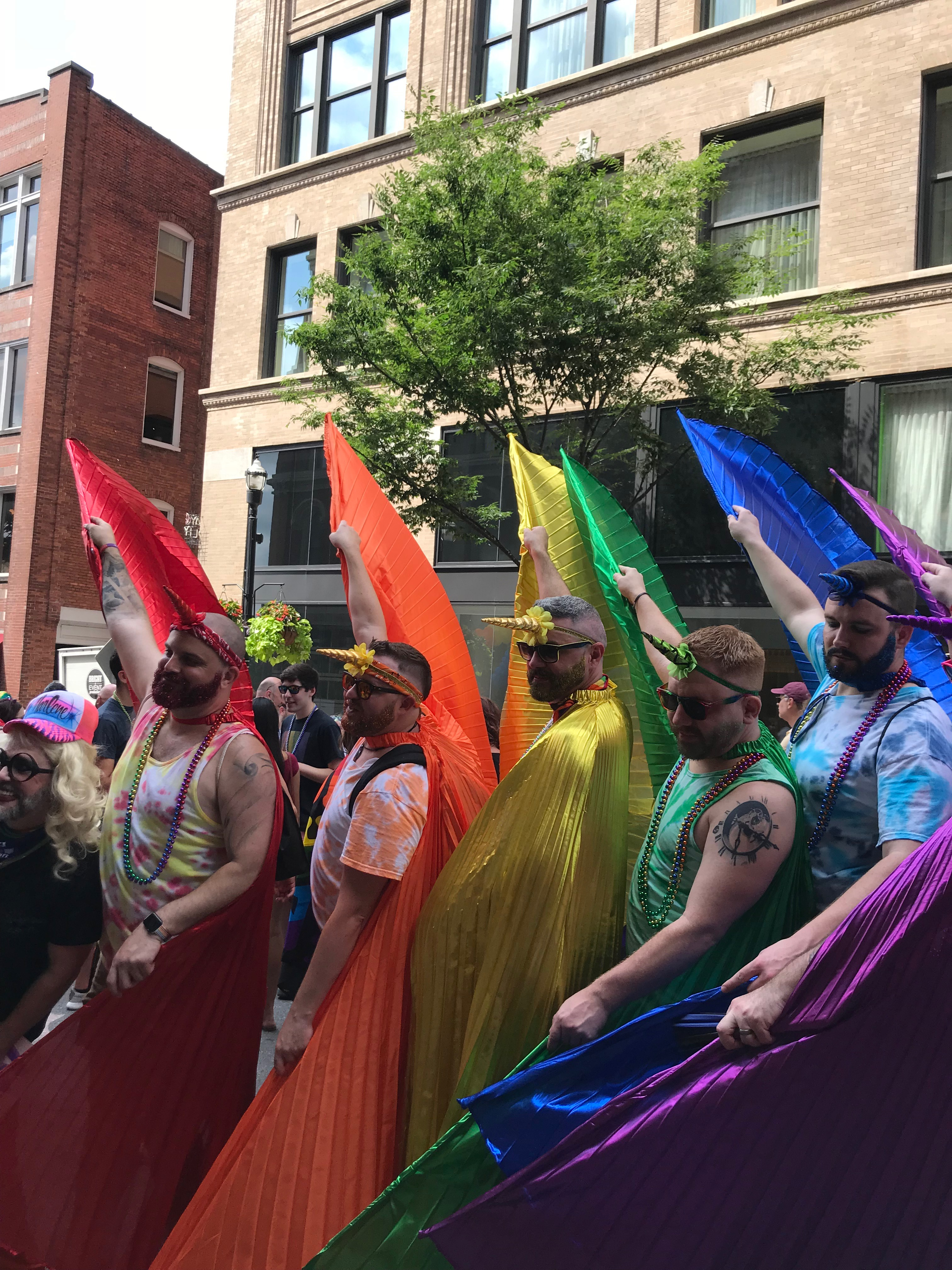
Photo taken at Nashville Pride

== LGBT friendliness ==
Each year, since 2012, The Human Rights Campaign rates cities based on five attributes that a city may or may not have, non-discrimination laws, the municipality as an employer, municipal services, law enforcement, and the city leadership's public position on LGBTQ equality. In 2019, they rated 506 cities, Nashville being one of them. Nashville scored higher than average (60 points out of 100), with 70 points out of 100. The city ranked the highest out of the eight cities that were ranked in Tennessee, which included Chattanooga, Clarksville, Franklin, Johnson City, Knoxville, Memphis, Murfreesboro, and Nashville.

== LGBT friendly areas ==
As a result of the partnership between OkCupid and Trulia in 2017 cities across the United States were given a "Pride Score" that determined the most LGBT friendly communities on a point-based scale. The highest Pride Score in Nashville was given to zip code 37206, an area that largely consists of East Nashville.

Along with East Nashville, Church Street is commonly known as "the center of gay life in Nashville." 2nd/4th Avenues are also considered LGBT friendly parts of Nashville.

== LGBT friendly businesses ==
=== Cafe Coco ===
Cafe Coco is 24-hour LGBT friendly cafe that serves a varied menu, including coffee, beer, sandwiches, pizza, pasta, and desserts.

=== Canvas ===
Canvas is a small gay-friendly bar on Church Street that holds up to 85 people. The bar features a small menu and quirky decor accented by warm lighting.

=== D'Andrews Bakery & Cafe ===
D'Andrews is an LGBT-owned bakery and cafe certified by the National LGBT Chamber of Commerce. The bakery/cafe is known for their build-your-own salad bar and their house-made dressings.

=== Lipstick Lounge ===
Lipstick Lounge is a lesbian-owned, predominantly, lesbian/girl bar in East Nashville.

=== The Turnip Truck ===
The Turnip Truck is an LGBT-owned natural grocer certified by the LGBT Business Enterprise.

== Resources ==
=== LGBT+ Resources ===
- Vanderbilt University medical center offers a variety of services to members of the LGBT community. Their LGBT health services include HIV care, intersex health, mental health, and a Trans Buddy Program. The Trans Buddy Program offers transgender people the opportunity to have someone help them make important medical decisions and be there for them before, during, and/or after their transition.
- Vanderbilt offers many student groups for the attendees of the university. One of these, Out in Engineering, provides the opportunity for students to make connections with other members of the more niche community of LGBT engineers.
- On their website Vanderbilt provides resources for students and faculty/staff who are looking for LGBT friendly housing off-campus.

We Are One Recovery

- "WeAreOneRecovery.org". is the state of Tennessee's first and only LGBTQ2iA+ recovery residence for mental health & addiction. They are permanent housing that offers free case management, peer counseling, and support groups. They are the leading organization for LGBT+ addiction support in Tennessee. They are a registered 501c3 and you may make a tax-deductible gift on their website.

== LGBT friendly media outlets ==
Name	Type of Media Outlet
Out & About Nashville	Magazine
Connect Magazine	Magazine
Nashville Lifestyles Magazine	Magazine
LGBTQIA Hub	Website
NewsChannel 5 Network	Television News

== HIV/AIDS prevention and care services ==
- Nashville CARES
- Street-Works Outreach Program
- My House
- Vanderbilt Comprehensive Care Clinic
- Music City PrEP Clinic
- Planned Parenthood of Tennessee and North Mississippi

== Communities ==
=== Certified LGBT Business Enterprises ===
Nashville businesses whose owners are members the LGBT community have the opportunity to become certified with the National LGBT Chamber of Commerce through the local Nashville LGBT Chamber of Commerce. According to the Chamber, Nashville's LGBTBEs are as follows:

- Abel McCallister & Abel
- BAM! Social Business
- Brandagement, LLC
- Brinnovate Digital Brand Marketing
- Clifton+Leopold
- D'Andrews Bakery & Cafe
- Diversity Builder, Inc.
- Dog and a Duck
- Doggie Doo's
- Force 1 Solutions
- Good Neighbor Festivals
- HelmsBriscoe
- Park Hill Realty Group
- MediCopy Services, Inc.
- Out & About Nashville
- Proudly Market
- Push the Marketing, LLC
- Ron Sanford Productions
- Schmidt Government Solutions
- Schooley Mitchell
- Social Link
- Southport Solutions
- STF Events & Catering, Inc.
- The Computer Butler, LLC
- The Turnip Truck
- TN Event Designs
- Tonda McKay Photography
- uBreakiFix
- Yuletide Office Solutions

=== Nashville in Harmony ===
Nashville in Harmony is a diverse and inclusive choir.

=== Oasis Center ===
Oasis Center is a youth center. Their Just Us program focusses on supporting and advocating for LGBT youth in Nashville.

=== Nashville LGBT Gaymers ===
Nashville LGBT Gaymers is a Facebook community of LGBT gamers within the Nashville area.

=== LGBT-affirming religious institutions ===
Name	Type of Institution
Christ Lutheran Church	Lutheran Church
Congregation Micah	Reform Synagogue
Covenant of the Cross	Non-denominational Church
Edgehill United Methodist	United Methodist Church
First Unitarian Universalist Nashville	Unitarian Universalist Church
Glendale Baptist	Baptist Church
Glendale United Methodist Church	United Methodist Church
Second Presbyterian Church	Presbyterian Church
The Table	Lutheran Church
Mt. Pisgah Fellowship
Belmont United Methodist Church	United Methodist Church
West End United Methodist Church	United Methodist Church

== Activities ==
=== Nashville Pride ===
Nashville Pride is an annual pride festival held in Nashville that includes a parade, vendors, and performances from music artists and other performers.

=== Nashville Black Pride ===
Nashville Black Pride hosts several annual pride events specifically for black members of the LGBT community, although all races and sexualities/orientations are welcome.

=== HotMess Sports ===
HotMess Sports is an LGBT sports league that plays a variety of sports such as dodgeball, kickball, and volleyball.

=== Metro Nashville Softball Association ===
MNSA is the local softball league and member of the national iPride organization. MNSA has teams spanning multiple divisions based on skill level, competing each Spring and Fall. Additionally, they play host to the Music City Classic Tournament each July where teams from across the US are invited to compete.
