= Brooklyn Community Pride Center =

501(c)(3) nonprofit LGBTQ+ community center in Brooklyn, New York, USA

Coordinates: 40°40′7″N 73°57′19″W

- Formation: 2008; 18 years ago
- Type: Community center
- Legal status: Non-profit organization
- Location: Brooklyn, New York
- President of the Board: Sonelius Kendrick-Smith
- CEO: Kenrick Ross
- Website: https://lgbtbrooklyn.org

Brooklyn Community Pride Center is a 501(c)(3) nonprofit LGBTQ+ community center in Brooklyn, New York. Incorporated in 2008, it was the first LGBTQ+ center in Bedford–Stuyvesant, Brooklyn.

== History ==
Brooklyn Community Pride Center was the first LGBTQ+ center in Bedford–Stuyvesant, Brooklyn. As of 2020, it remains the only LGBTQ+ center there.

Erin Drinkwater was executive director from 2012 through 2014. During this time, the center moved from its 600-square-foot walk-up quarters to a 1,600 square-foot facility. In 2014, Deborah Brennan joined the center's board of directors and in 2015 became president of the board. She then recruited Floyd Rumohr as the center's new chief executive officer. In January 2021, Deborah Brennan transitioned off the board and Sonelius Kendrick-Smith was elected president. Jessica Greer Morris, was interim executive director until August 29, 2023. She stepped in following the departure of Floyd Rumohr who was chief executive officer until September 2022. On October 2, 2023, Kenrick Ross assumed the leadership of the Center.

In 2020, the center signed a 30-year lease for a new headquarters, to be located inside a section of the Bedford Union Armory in Crown Heights. The new space is to contain Brooklyn's "first dedicated mental health LGBTQ clinic", while the old space will be retained and dedicated to youth programming and services.

== Projects ==
- LGBTQ New Americans Project, an oral history project of lesbian, gay, bisexual, transgender, and queer immigrants living in New York City launched in 2016 in collaboration with Immigration Equality

== Programs and services ==
Services and programs provided by the center include:

- Health and wellness services for youth, the elderly, and transgender and gender-nonconforming individuals, as well as Brooklyn's first clinic devoted to LGBTQ mental health
- Homelessness and housing including a laundry facility for use by LGBTQ homeless persons
- Pride Path Workforce Development
- Social Isolation
- Immigration
- Racial Justice
