= LGBTQ culture in San Antonio =

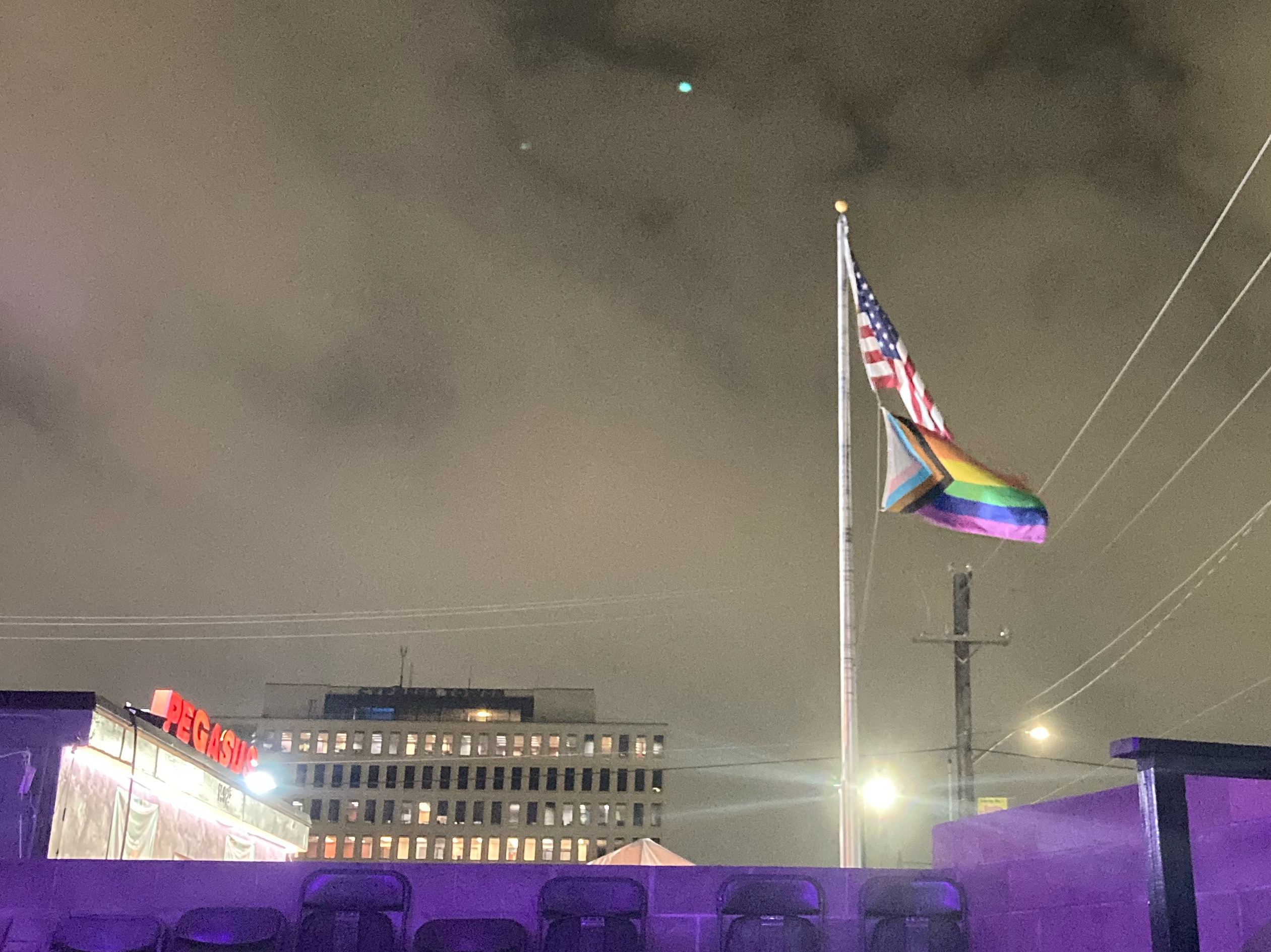
American and LGBT pride flags over Pegasus Nightclub, San Antonio, 2025

LGBTQ+ culture in the U.S. city of San Antonio, Texas, is prevalent within the city, especially the Downtown area. There is a large LGBTQ+ Latinx population in the city. LGBTQ+ people have been present in the area since the 1930s. San Antonio Country was a popular gay bar in the 1970s.

There is a large concentration of LGBTQ+ people, especially gay people in St. Mary's Strip, colloquially referred to as "The Strip". Several recent policies electing openly LGBTQ+ officials and supporting the city's LGBTQ+ community have been enacted within the past few years.

== History ==
=== 1930-1940s ===
Male cross-dressers or "female impersonators" performed in several San Antonio bars and venues across the 1930s into the 1940s. In 1935, a group of male cross-dressers were arrested and eventually let out of jail on orders to leave the city, then arrested again several days later when they refused to do so. Their trials and various escapades were covered in local news and garnered public attention.

=== 1950s-1960s ===
Between 1951 and 1964, gay designers and scriptwriters helped create "Corny-ation" as a new performance in the annual Fiesta San Antonio, which included a performance style that used camp and coded gay language in its scripts. Many gay men and lesbians also performed in the show. Corny-ation was a purposeful caricature and critique of the Coronation of the Queen of the Order of the Alamo, with the courts and crowned queens of Corny-ation being linked to humorous and common things, like scarecrows and cracked salad bowls. The event was heavily covered by local newspapers and eventually included on official programming, with the audience and participants being mostly middle or lower class. The performance was ended in 1964 by the San Antonio Conservation Society, despite outcry from the wider public.

=== 1960s-1970s ===
Several notable gay bars were open around this time for gay and lesbian patrons. The most well-known was a bar called "The Country" or Paul's Grove. The Country was located on the outer edges of the city, in an attempt to prevent frequent raiding, though raids on the bar still occurred. The Country also allowed for same-sex couples to dance together, publicly.

Another notable gay and lesbian bar was Mary Ellen's Top Hat, which also doubled as an interracial bar. The bar was owned by and named after a straight Black women, Mary Ellen.

In 1973, the first San Antonio Pride Parade was held with a small crowd of roughly 35 people.

=== 1980s-90s ===
In 1982, the first official San Antonio Pride week was held, moving it to the city instead of having participants travel to Houston.

In 1991, the trial for the murder of Charles Reséndez, a gay Latino substitute teacher, by visiting marine Nicolo Giangrosso sparked outrage among gay and Latino organizations after Giangrosso was sentenced to ten years of probation on a guilty verdict after pleading on a gay panic defense. Several large rallies in San Antonio were held following the news of the sentencing and later joined with an ongoing, larger gay rights movement in Texas during 1994.

== Organizations ==
The Happy Foundation is a community formed archive now housed at the University of Texas San Antonio, managed by Melissa Gohlke. The archive includes all kinds of materials related to LGBTQ+ history in San Antonio, including home videos, pamphlets, and zines.

== Policy ==
The Pride Cultural Heritage District was established in 2025.

San Antonio elected its first openly lesbian Mayor, Gina Ortiz Jones, in 2025.

The city council of San Antonio instated pride flag sidewalks following the ordered cleaning of rainbow crosswalks by the Texas State government. The sidewalk also includes the colors for the trans, nonbinary, and people of color flags alongside the rainbow colors.

Thrive Youth came to an agreement to raise money for the building of a transitional supporting house for at-risk and homeless LGBTQ+ youth in the next few years, which would be the first of its kind in the state of Texas.
