= Keith St. John (politician) =

American politician (born 1957)

Keith C. St. John

Albany Common Council Alderman, 2nd Ward
- In office 1990–1998

Personal details
- Born: August 5, 1957 (age 68)
- Party: Democratic Party

Keith C. St. John (born August 5, 1957) is an American politician. He is the first African American openly gay person elected to public office in the United States.

He started his legal career in Albany, New York in 1985.

On November 7, 1989, St. John won the election for Common Council Alderman in the 2nd Ward of Albany, New York. On November 2, 1993, he was reelected to another 4-year term.
