= Down-low =

Down-low (also "on the down low" or "on the DL") may refer to any activity or relationship kept discreet.

It may also refer to:

- Down-low (sexual slang), men who identify as heterosexual but secretly participate in sexual activity with other men

== Music ==
- Down Low (rap group), a rap/hip hop group
- "On the DL", a 1992 song from the album Bizarre Ride II the Pharcyde
- "On the DL", a song by Caviar on their 2004 LP The Thin Mercury Sound
- "Down Low (Nobody Has to Know)", a 1995 song by R. Kelly
- "Down Low", a song by Doja Cat from her 2018 album Amala
- "Down Low", a 2017 song by Hypno Carlito
- Down Low (album), a 2005 album by Betzefer

== Film and television ==
- "The Down Low", the 11th episode of House season 6
- Down Low (film), a 2023 comedy film

== Books ==
- On the Down Low, a non-fiction book written by J. L. King
