= Men on... =

Television comedy sketch

Title card for the first "Men on ..." sketch, "Men on Films", broadcast April 15, 1990

"Men on..." (colloquially and more commonly known as the subtitle of their most frequent theme of sketches Men on Films or sometimes billed Men on Film) is the umbrella title for a series of comedy sketches that first appeared in episodes of the Fox sketch comedy series In Living Color, and also later occasionally on the NBC sketch comedy series Saturday Night Live.

The sketch features two African-American, gay, reporters, Blaine Edwards (Damon Wayans) and Antoine Merriweather (David Alan Grier). In each sketch, they review popular movies and television series, give their opinions and critique of recent pop culture and celebrity news, and also talk about lifestyle, leisure, literature, and art topics.

"Men on ..." first appeared on the premiere episode of In Living Color and continued throughout Wayans's tenure on the series. The sketch was revived on the late-night comedy series Saturday Night Live when Wayans hosted.

"Men on ..." engendered controversy for its portrayal of black gay men. Both Blaine and Antoine were portrayed as extremely effeminate. Some LGBT people and organizations felt this portrayal was insulting to gay men, although response within the community was split. Cultural critics have identified "Men on ..." as having affected how African American men view homosexuality within their communities.

== Format ==
Blaine Edwards (left) and Antoine Merriweather make their debut in "Men on Films".

"Men on Books", six weeks later, shows how in just a short time Blaine and Antoine became much more stereotypically flamboyant.

The first installment of "Men on ...", "Men on Films", established the basic pattern for the sketch series. Over the strains of "It's Raining Men" by The Weather Girls, an announcer introduces the public access program "Men on Films". Hosts Blaine Edwards and Antoine Merriweather introduce themselves and explain that they will be discussing films of the day "from a male point of view".

They review Do the Right Thing, The Karate Kid Part III and Great Balls of Fire! and upcoming video releases for Black Widow, Miss Firecracker and Dangerous Liaisons. In each instance the film is reviewed with an extreme gay male interpretation regardless of any actual gay content or sensibility; in some cases, the review of the film is based solely on the film's name or the name of its stars. Do the Right Thing is praised for its supposed message of "Do the right thing, come on out the closet, don't be afraid to be who you is", whereas Karate Kid is panned for not exploring the possibility of a pederastic relationship between Mr. Miyagi and Daniel LaRusso.

Black Widow and Miss Firecracker, both of which feature women in the leading roles, are dismissed with a simple "Hated it!" Blaine initially praises Dangerous Liaisons for its courage in casting Glenn Close in a female role; Antoine informs Blaine that Close is actually a woman, prompting Blaine to exclaim "Clutch the pearls, what a sneaky thing to do!" The pair signify approval of a film by giving it "two snaps up!"

Subsequent sketches would explore other aspects of popular culture, including art, books and television. With each installment the sexual puns would become cruder and more abundant, the costumes would become more flamboyant and the "snaps up" (Men on Film) would become more and more elaborate. The variations included "two snaps, and a twist" (Men on Film), "two snaps, a twist and a kiss; stop! Can't touch this!" (Men on Film), "two snaps in a circle" (Men on Art), "a yet unheard of Zorro snap, in Z formation" (Men on Books), "two snaps and your back field in motion" (Men on Football, live before the Super Bowl), "two snaps, and wipe yo mouth" (the "Chef Boyardee" snap in Men on Cooking), "around the world and back snap" (Men on Vacation), and a special snap for the "Men on Fitness" episode that was difficult to understand due to the actors laughing.

== Inspiration ==
Speaking to NPR in 2012, Grier explained the inspiration for his characterization: "I had already done Dreamgirls on Broadway, and being in a musical and working with other performers who were gay, I was privy to that vocabulary backstage. They were being themselves. So a lot of it was hijacked from what I heard in the theater and what was permeating around. Now at that time, if a gay person was going to read you — to tell you off — it was always accompanied by snaps. Now I don't know if it was a gay thing, but it was also a very black thing."

== Notable Sketches ==
- "Men on Films" – April 15, 1990
- "Men on Art" – May 5, 1990
- "Men on Books" – May 26, 1990
- "Men on Films II" – September 23, 1990
- "Men on Vacation" – April 7, 1991
- "Men on Television" – May 12, 1991
- "Men on Film: The Return" – September 29, 1991
- "Men on Film Festival" – November 24, 1991
- "Men on Football" – January 26, 1992
- "Men on European Vacation" - February 23, 1992
- "Men on Videotape Rentals" – March 29, 1992
- "Men on Cooking" – November 22, 1992
- "Men on Fitness" – February 7, 1993
- "Men on Film" – April 8, 1995. Saturday Night Live sketch featuring Chris Farley as Roger Ebert.

== Reception and cultural impact ==
Fox was hesitant about the "Men on ..." sketches before the series premiere. According to series creator Keenen Ivory Wayans, the chairman of Fox sat down with him to try to persuade him to pull "Men on Films" from the premiere episode. Damon Wayans reported that after Fox moved In Living Color from its original 9:30 p.m. Eastern Time to 8:00 p.m., Fox censors began exercising more editorial control over the sketches. "David will say something to me [in a "Men on ..." sketch] and it will cut to me and I'm smiling. What I said was taken out. It happens a lot."

The "Men on ..." series was controversial within the LGBT community. At the time Blaine and Antoine were the only recurring gay characters on network television, also making them the only African American gay characters on the air. As evidenced by a 1992 survey by the San Francisco chapter of the Gay & Lesbian Alliance Against Defamation, opinion was split roughly down the middle on the sketches. Half of respondents found the sketches humorous while the other half found them offensive and dangerous. Gay African American filmmaker Marlon Riggs sharply criticized the sketches, saying that they perpetuated "a notion that black gay men are sissies, ineffectual, ineffective, womanish in a way that signifies inferiority".

In an appearance on The Phil Donahue Show following In Living Color's second season, Damon Wayans responded to critics of "Men on ..." by saying:

Well, first off, all the sketches on the show have to be looked at within the context of the show, and it's not as though we isolate any particular group. We make fun of everybody, and so I don't think anybody should have a chip on their shoulder—when it's a free-for-all. And the other thing, too, is, the sketch is not a bashing sketch. We don't do jokes about any issues related to gay people. It's really a play on the extremes of the stereotype, and that's it.

In 2021, Grier gave his thoughts on whether the sketch could be done today. He said:

At the time, as far as I know, there were no out gay or trans/genderfluid cast members. There was nothing in that comedy which I felt was homophobic gay hatred. But I also am smart enough to know it’s not how your heart was behind the joke; it’s how that joke or that characterization lands with other people. So that was a long time ago. I don’t think we could do that now, which is fine. If Living Color were on now, I would hope that there would be more than one gay cast members in the show, and then they could tackle this humor using their voice.

Author J. L. King, whose writings explore the down-low phenomenon within the African American male community, cited Blaine and Antoine, along with drag performer RuPaul, as images of what the word "gay" means to African American men who have sex with men to explain one reason why such men do not identify themselves as gay.

Cultural critic Angela Nelson places Blaine and Antoine in the context of what she identifies as the "sophisticated sissy" alongside characters like Lindy (Antonio Fargas) from the film Car Wash. These characters depict African American homosexual males as effeminate and/or cross dressers. The "sophisticated sissy" characterization frequently appears in dialogue between two (ostensibly heterosexual) black male characters, often in the context of one character accusing the other of being weak in his handling of women, and is often accompanied by a stereotypical limp wrist or hip swishing gesture.

In 1990, rap music group The 2 Live Crew parodied "Men on ..." in the skit "In Color - Men on Records" from their album Banned in the U.S.A. In the sketch, the album itself is rated "two snaps straight up and down", highlighted by the song "Face Down, Ass Up".

== See also ==
- African-American culture and sexual orientation

== Bibliography ==
- Alexander, George (2003). Why We Make Movies: Black Filmmakers Talk About the Magic of Cinema. Random House. ISBN 0-7679-1181-4.
- Capsuto, Steven (2000). Alternate Channels: The Uncensored Story of Gay and Lesbian Images on Radio and Television. Ballantine Books. ISBN 0-345-41243-5.
- Creekmur, Corey K.; Doty, Alexander (1995). Out in Culture: Gay, Lesbian, and Queer Essays on Popular Culture. Continuum International Publishing Group. ISBN 0-304-33488-X.
- King, J. L.; Hunter, Karen (2004). On the Down Low: A Journey Into the Lives of "Straight" Black Men Who Sleep With Men. Random House Digital, Inc. ISBN 0-7679-1399-X.
- Means Coleman, Robin R. (1998). African American Viewers and the Black Situation Comedy: Situating Racial Humor. Taylor & Francis. ISBN 0-8153-3125-8.
- Tropiano, Stephen (2002). The Prime Time Closet: A History of Gays and Lesbians on TV. Hal Leonard Corporation. ISBN 1-55783-557-8.
- Walters, Suzanna Danuta (2001). "All gay, all the time?". All the rage: the story of gay visibility in America. Chicago: University of Chicago Press. ISBN 9780226872322.
