= You Don't Say? =

Awareness campaign

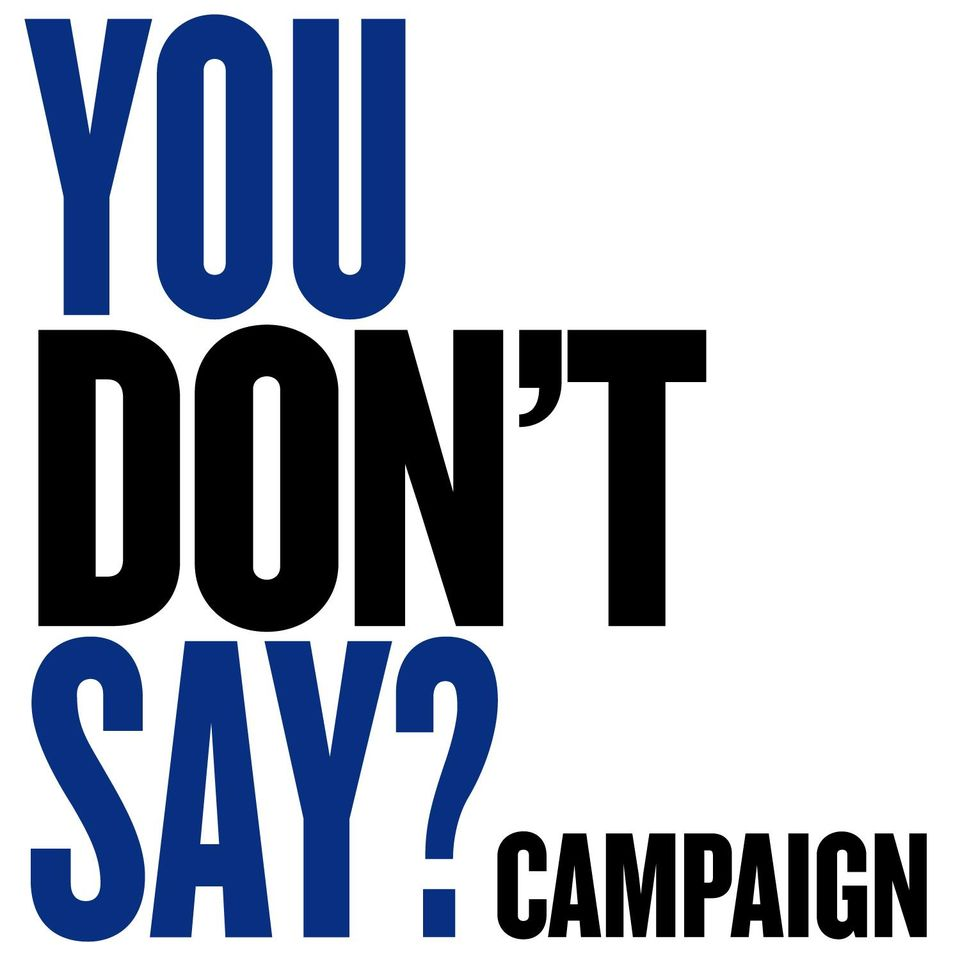
- Founder: Anuj Chhabra, Daniel Kort, Christie Lawrence, and Jay Sullivan
- Website: www.facebook.com/youdontsaycampaign/

You Don't Say? is a campaign composed of a series of photos created by students attending the Duke University aimed at bringing awareness to the sometimes derogatory or harmful meaning of phrases such as "no homo" or "man up".

== Origin ==
The campaign was created by students from the "Think Before You Talk" and "Blue Devils United", two student societies at Duke University. The students who founded the campaign are Daniel Kort, Anuj Chhabra, Christie Lawrence, and Jay Sullivan. According to Kort, he was motivated to start the campaign after being helped by his friends after being called a fag at the university.

== Aims ==
The campaign's goal is to bring awareness to certain phases and words perceived as harmful, especially those related to gender and the LGBT community, and how the use of language can be harmful. It also aims to decrease the use of the terms. According to Chhabra, the goal of the campaign was to "use personal testaments to let people personally challenge themselves", and according to Lawrence, the campaign is "an attempt to show how these words are hurtful". Both stated that the campaign does not aim to ban the use of certain words and phases or "invalidate someone's right to free speech". Finally, Sullivan states that "this campaign is not about language; it is about what this language represents."
