= Rivers to Cross =

River to Cross or Rivers to Cross may refer to:

- Many Rivers to Cross, a song by Jimmy Cliff
- One More River to Cross (book), a 1996 book by Keith Boykin
- One More River to Cross (album), a 1973 album by Canned Heat
