= One More River to Cross =

One More River to Cross may refer to:

- One More River to Cross (book), a 1996 book by Keith Boykin
- One More River to Cross (album), a 1973 album by Canned Heat
