= Down-low (sexual slang) =

Sexual subculture within the African-American community

Down-low, sometimes shortened to DL, is an African-American slang term generally used within the African-American community that typically refers to a sexual subculture of black men who usually identify as heterosexual but actively seek sexual encounters and relations with other men or with trans women, practice gay cruising, and frequently don a specific hip-hop attire during these activities. They generally avoid disclosing their same-sex sexual activities, even if they have female sexual partner(s), they are married to a woman, or they are single. The term is also used to refer to a related sexual identity. Down-low has been viewed as "a type of impression management that some of the informants use to present themselves in a manner that is consistent with perceived norms about masculine attribute, attitudes, and behavior".

== Origins ==
The term down-low originated within the African-American community, and was originally used to describe "any kind of slick, secretive behavior, including infidelity in heterosexual relationships". In medical research, the term is used to identify sexual identity-behaviour discordance among men who have sex with men (MSM).

According to a study published in the Journal of Bisexuality, "[t]he Down Low is a lifestyle predominately practiced by young, urban Black men who have sex with other men and women, yet do not identify as gay or bisexual".

In this context, "being on the down-low" is more than just men having sex with men in secret, or a variant of closeted homosexuality or bisexuality—it is a sexual identity that is, at least partly, defined by its "cult of masculinity" and its rejection of what is perceived as White American culture (including what is perceived as White American LGBT culture) and terms. A 2003 cover story in The New York Times Magazine on the down-low phenomenon explains that the American Black community sees "homosexuality as a white man's perversion." It then goes on to describe the down-low subculture as follows:

Rejecting a gay culture they perceive as white and effeminate, many black men have settled on a new identity, with its own vocabulary and customs and its own name: Down Low. There have always been men – black and white – who have had secret sexual lives with men. But the creation of an organized, underground subculture largely made up of black men who otherwise live straight lives is a phenomenon of the last decade. ... Most date or marry women and engage sexually with men they meet only in anonymous settings like bathhouses and parks or through the Internet. Many of these men are young and from the inner city, where they live in a hypermasculine thug culture. Other DL men form romantic relationships with men and may even be peripheral participants in mainstream gay culture, all unknown to their colleagues and families. Most DL men identify themselves not as gay or bisexual but first and foremost as black. To them, as to many blacks, that equates to being inherently masculine.

=== Social context and American sexual subcultures ===
In his book Beyond the Down Low: Sex, Lies and Denial in Black America, Keith Boykin states that secret homosexual relations are not unique to African-American men, and in fact occur in many societies and among all races.

In "Power Plays, Power Works" John Fiske suggests that closeted homosexuality may be more common in American communities suffering from widespread poverty, in which members reportedly depend heavily on traditional family networks (and often religious institutions) for financial and emotional support.

The term quickly became conflated with an eroticization of homosexual activities among Black and Latino men. Throughout the gay pornographic industry and internet networks, down-low quickly became a marketing term used to publicize pornographic movies, models, sex clubs, and social gatherings that included Black and Latino men.

== Media interest ==
The first known person to use the term down-low in a homosexual context was George Hanna, who used the term in the 1930 song Boy in the Boat about lesbian women. The term was popularized in the late 1990s and after by a series of mainstream media reports emphasizing the danger of Black men transmitting HIV/AIDS to their unsuspecting female partners.

The first mainstream media account of the down-low as a subculture of closeted homosexuality or bisexuality was reported in the Los Angeles Times on February 7, 2001. By the end of the year, numerous major media outlets had reported on the down-low. They included The New York Times (11 February), USA Today (March 15), Columbus Dispatch (March 19), St. Louis Post-Dispatch (April 1), The New York Times (April 3), Chicago Sun-Times (April 22), Atlanta Journal-Constitution (June 3), San Francisco Chronicle (June 4), Village Voice (June 6), Vibe magazine (July), Jet magazine (September 8), Essence magazine (October), San Diego Union-Tribune (December 2), and Los Angeles Times (December 7). Nearly all these stories connected the down-low phenomenon to the HIV/AIDS epidemic within the African-American community.

In the summer of 2003, Village Voice contributing writer and NYU professor Jason King published "Remixing the Closet: The Down Low Way of Knowledge", in the newspaper's June 2003 "Queer Issue," a controversial op-ed piece that questioned the relationship between HIV/AIDS and men "on the down low". The article was the first mainstream piece to openly criticize negative mainstream media depictions of down-low Black men and evaluated the down-low phenomenon from a different perspective.

King argued that the use of the term down-low was a way for many African-American men to admit to having sex with other men without necessarily identifying as "gay" in the traditional sense. On the heels of that article, San Francisco Chronicle contributing writer Frank Leon Roberts published "Stereotypes and Sexual Orientation: The 'down-low' – Coming out your own way in [B]lack clubs" in the newspaper's July 23, 2003 issue.

Then in August 2003 The New York Times Magazine ran a cover story called "Double Lives on the Down Low", written by Benoit Denizet-Lewis. Several episodes of The Oprah Winfrey Show were also dedicated to the subject including an episode aired 16 April 2004 and titled A Secret Sex World: Living on the 'Down Low' ; the show featured J. L. King discussing his book On the Down Low: A Journey Into the Lives of Straight Black Men Who Sleep with Men. The down-low subculture was also part of story lines on episodes of the television shows Law & Order: Special Victims Unit, Homicide Hunter, The Starter Wife, ER, and Oz.

In 2003 Jeffrey Q. McCune Jr. wrote a full-length play entitled Dancin the Down Low that he directed and produced at Northwestern University in April 2004. In addition, McCune has dedicated a dissertation on this topic. His study examines discourses on the down-low subculture closely, while also exploring how down-low Black men face the issues of masculinity and sexuality.

In 2008, writer Terrance Dean published his memoir, Hiding in Hip-Hop: On the Down Low in the Entertainment Industry—from Music to Hollywood, where he discusses his own experience being down-low in the industry as well as others in the industry who are also down-low. He distinguishes the difference between being down-low and being down-low-gay. Someone who is down-low is on the receiving end of homosexual sexual pleasure and for that reason does not view themselves as gay, while down-low-gay is someone who is a closeted gay man.

Using a content analysis of more than 170 articles written between 2001 and 2006, sociologist Richard N. Pitt Jr. concluded that the media pathologized Black bisexual men's behavior while either ignoring or sympathizing with White bisexual men's similar actions. He argued that the down-low Black bisexual is often described negatively as a "duplicitous heterosexual" man whose behaviors threaten the Black community. Alternatively, the "Brokeback" White bisexual (when seen as bisexual at all) is often described in pitying language as a "victimized homosexual" man who is forced into the closet by the heterosexist society around him.

== HIV/AIDS epidemic ==
Men who have both anal and vaginal sex with men and women and who do not consistently use condoms are a "significant bridge for HIV to women", a Centers for Disease Control and Prevention study suggested. The CDC's Young Men's Survey shows that about one in 10 men reporting sex with men also have sex with women. And more than one in four of these bisexual men have unsafe sex with both kinds of partners. "Men who also have sex with women have similar levels of HIV and STDs [as exclusively homosexual men] and higher levels of many risky behaviors."

A study by Glenn and Spieldenner uses the CDC as a source to report the following:

"This issue continues to be stigmatized and connected to HIV/AIDS research, particularly how it connects to risky sexual practices influencing its transmission to partners, controversies regarding social awareness and acceptance of Black male sexuality, as well as disclosure or nondisclosure of those practices and behaviors."

The CDC report that analyzes the above-mentioned survey states that "many men who have sex with men (MSM), especially young and minority MSM, do not disclose their sexual orientation" in order to avoid "social isolation, discrimination, or verbal or physical abuse." The report connects non-disclosure to an increased risk of HIV by stating: "Young MSM who do not disclose their sexual orientation (nondisclosers) are thought to be at particularly high risk for human immunodeficiency virus (HIV) infection because of low self-esteem, depression, or lack of peer support and prevention services that are available to MSM who are more open about their sexuality (disclosers)."

The CDC added a note to their report stating, in part:

"The findings in this report are consistent with previous research suggesting that among MSM, nondisclosure of sexual orientation is associated with being a member of a racial/ethnic minority group, identifying as bisexual or heterosexual, having greater perceived community and internalized homophobia, and being less integrated socially within homosexual communities (1—3,6). Although this study did not find that nondisclosing MSM were at higher risk for HIV infection than MSM who are more open about their sexuality (1—3), the data suggests that a substantial proportion of nondisclosers are infected with HIV and other STDs and are at high risk for transmitting these infections to their male and female sex partners.

The finding that more than one in three nondisclosers reported having recent female sex partners suggests that nondisclosing MSM might have an important role in HIV/STD transmission to women. This might be particularly true for Black nondisclosing MSM, of whom approximately one in five was infected with HBV and one in seven was infected with HIV."

The CDC cited three findings that relate to African-American men who operate on the down-low (engage in MSM activity but don't disclose to others):

- African American men who have sex with men (MSM), but who do not disclose their sexual orientation (nondisclosers), have a high prevalence of HIV infection (14%); nearly three times higher than nondisclosing MSMs of all other races/ethnicities combined (5%).
- Confirming previous research, the study of 5,589 MSM, aged 15–29 years, in six U.S. cities found that African American MSM were more likely not to disclose their sexual orientation compared with white MSM (18% vs. 8%).
- HIV-infected nondisclosers were less likely to know their HIV status (98% were unaware of their infection compared with 75% of HIV-positive disclosers), and more likely to have had recent female sex partners.

In Beyond the Down Low, Keith Boykin denied this connection, attributing the media claim to sexism, racism, homophobia and classism. Boykin stated that despite the numerous media accounts linking the down-low to the occurrence of AIDS in the African-American community, the U.S. Centers for Disease Control and Prevention has never cited men on the down-low as a factor. Boykin claimed that no extensive research has ever been published about men on the down-low, in part because of the difficulty of identifying the targeted population. In his book, Beyond The Down Low: Sex, Lies and Denial in Black America, he wrote that men on the 'down-low' are not the cause of the HIV/AIDS epidemic in Black America. Boykin argued that the down-low debate demonizes Black men, stigmatizes Black women, and encourages an unhealthy "battle of the sexes" that distracts the community's attention from the issues of HIV prevention, personal responsibility and condom use.

The authors of a study of the down-low on Craigslist.org also argue that the discourse about the down-low is about pathologizing Black sexualities. These authors found that white men also claim to be on the down-low as much as Black men; however, society and the media still only attributes the down-low to Black people and their sexual behaviors. The authors maintain that by only focusing on Black people's sexual behaviors, larger structural issues such as poverty and drug use are ignored in the discussion about rising HIV rates in certain Black communities.

A cross-study analysis that reviewed 24 articles (and published in the Journal of the National Medical Association) found that "Black MSM are more likely than MSM of other racial or ethnic groups to be bisexually active or identified; and, compared with white MSM, are less likely to disclose their bisexual or homosexual activities to others." The authors concluded that:

"The high prevalence of HIV in the Black community and the greater likelihood of bisexuality among Black men place heterosexual Black women at risk for HIV infection. However, the contribution of high-risk heterosexual Black men to the rising HIV caseload among Black women has been largely ignored. Future research must evaluate the relative contributions of bisexual men and exclusively heterosexual Black men to HIV cases among Black women."

Additionally, a qualitative study, published in the Medical Anthropological Quarterly, concluded that:

"... covert and unprotected sex among bisexually active Black men was commonplace for reasons that included prostitution, habituation to same-sex relations during incarceration, and the desire to maintain a facade of heterosexuality in homophobic communities. It was concluded that bisexual activity is highly correlated with secrecy and unprotected sex. The risks of bisexuality among Black men are exacerbated by incarceration, homophobia, drug use, and the prison and public health focus on surveillance rather than prevention."

== Black people in the glass closet ==
In Nobody Is Supposed to Know: Black Sexuality on the Down Low (2014), scholar C. Riley Snorton contends that Black sexuality operates within the glass closet, a space "marked by hypervisibility and confinement, spectacle, and speculation." Down-low men have been subjected to demonization and criminalization by the media, health officials, as well as the general public, especially during the early to mid-2000s. This type of hypervisibility reinforces the confining space of the glass closet, and continues to position Black men as subjects of regulation and surveillance. Therefore, Black masculinity is perceived as "dangerous, prone to trickery, promiscuous, and contaminated while also framing white masculinity and sexuality as less susceptible to such problems." The glass closet represents the immobility of Black people and sexuality. Down-low men are racialized, sexualized, gendered, and classed.

Snorton describes:

The (meta)physics of the glass closet are like the physical properties of glass, sometimes liquid and sometimes solid, located in the slippages of categorization. If we understand the closet as a racialized metaphor, then we must fully consider what it means when Black bodies enter the illuminating space of the closet. It resembles the phenomenon of peering into a lit window at night—the contents inside captured by the glass frame.

Despite the hypervisibility of the glass closet, there is still potential for the performative tactic which Snorton calls "ignorance". This ignorance "relies on the subversion of knowledge and a deft manipulation of spectacle." Thus, the glass closet can also function as a space of willful invisibility for down-low Black men.

== See also ==
- African-American culture and sexual orientation
- African-American LGBTQ community
- Banjee
- Bi-curious
- Bisexuality in the United States
- Censorship of LGBTQ issues
- Closeted
- E. Lynn Harris
- Ego-dystonic sexual orientation
- He never married
- Homophobia in ethnic minority communities
- Lavender marriage
- Men who have sex with men (MSM)
- No homo
- Not Gay
- Prison sexuality
- Queer erasure
- Same gender loving
- Sexual addiction
- Trade (gay slang)

== Bibliography ==
- Dean, Terrance (2008). Hiding in Hip-Hop: On the Down Low in the Entertainment Industry—from Music to Hollywood. New York, NY: Atria Books. ISBN 978-1416553403.
- Boykin, Keith (2005). Beyond The Down Low. Avalon. ISBN 0-7867-1434-4.
- King, J.L. (2004). On the Down Low. Broadway. ISBN 0-7679-1398-1.
- Williams, Jeffrey Lee Jr. (2004). The Low-down on the Down Low. The Gay & Lesbian Review Worldwide., 11(6), 6.
- Hubbard, Thomas K. (2003). Homosexuality in Greece and Rome. University of California Press. ISBN 0-520-23430-8.
- Roberts, Frank Leon (2003). The 'down-low' – Coming out your own way in black clubs. San Francisco Chronicle., July 24, 2003.
- Williams, Craig A. (1999). Roman Homosexuality : Ideologies of Masculinity in Classical Antiquity. Oxford University Press. ISBN 0-19-512505-3.
