= L&D =

L&D may refer to:

- Learning and development, in human resource management and training
- Labor and delivery, in health care
- Lock and dam, in civil engineering
- Grand Theft Auto IV: The Lost and Damned, in games and toys
- Luton and Dunstable University Hospital, a hospital in Bedfordshire, England

== See also ==
- L/D (disambiguation)
