= Beyond the Down Low =

2005 nonfiction book by Keith Boykin

Beyond the Down Low: Sex, Lies and Denial in Black America
- Author: Keith Boykin
- Language: English
- Publication place: United States
- Media type: Print (hardback & paperback)

Beyond the Down Low: Sex, Lies and Denial in Black America is a 2005 nonfiction book by Keith Boykin.

This book of essays analyzes the validity of the down low phenomenon, first publicized by J. L. King in his book On the Down Low. It covers multiple discussions about gay sexuality, the African American community, homophobia, and the spread of HIV.

Boykin distances himself from King's conclusions, accusing him of making a name for himself by spreading misinformation. He also stresses that not only African-American men who have sex with men are "on the down low". He names two Caucasians, Jim McGreevey and Ed Schrock, as examples of non-blacks technically "on the down low".

He pinpoints how an article in The New York Times stating that a large number of black, gay men has been twisted to suggest that there are many men on the down low purposely infecting heterosexual, African-American women. Finally, he argues that only when more African-American men and women are openly gay in the media spotlight, this will diminish homophobia in black communities or disprove that homosexuality is a predominantly white (or at least non-black) phenomenon.

== See also ==
- On the Down Low: A Journey into the Lives of Straight Black Men Who Sleep with Men

General:

- African-American culture and sexual orientation
