= DL =

DL, dL, or dl may stand for:

== Science and technology ==
=== Electronics and computing ===
- <dl></dl>, an HTML element used for a definition list
- Deep learning, a field of machine learning
- Description logics, a family of knowledge representation languages
- Delete Line (ANSI), an ANSI X3.64 escape sequence
- Digital library, a library in which collections are stored in digital formats
- Diode logic, a logic family using diodes
- DVD-R DL, a DVD Dual Layer engineering method
- DL register, the low byte of an X86 16-bit DX register
- Dynamic loading, a mechanism for a computer program to load a library

==== Telecommunications ====
- Data link, a computer connection for transmitting data
- Distribution list, a function of e-mail clients
- Downlink, the link from a satellite to a ground station
- Download, a transfer of electronic data

=== Vehicles ===
- Subaru DL, an automobile
- Australian National DL class, a class of diesel locomotives built by Clyde Engineering
- New Zealand DL class locomotive, a diesel-electric class built by Dalian Locomotive and Rolling Stock Company
- Destroyer leader, a large naval vessel capable of leading a flotilla

=== Other uses in science and technology ===
- ⟨dl⟩, a digraph; see List of Latin script digraphs.
- Dimensionless quantity (dl, in lower case), the 'per unit' system of measurement
- Decilitre (or deciliter, dL), a unit of measurement of capacity or volume
- Discrete logarithms, in mathematics
- Distance learning, Internet-based education
- HPE ProLiant DL, density line servers
- Dextrorotation and levorotation or D/L nomenclature, used in naming chemical compounds

== Arts and entertainment ==
- D.L. (play), a Bulgarian play
- DL series, a series of adventures and some supplementary material for the Advanced Dungeons & Dragons role playing game
- D. L. Hawkins, fictional character on the American television series Heroes
- D. L. Hughley (born 1963), American actor and comedian
- Directors Lounge, an ongoing Berlin-based film and media-art platform and/or its annual film festival
- Dominant leittonwechselklänge

== Business ==
- Dai-ichi Life, an insurance company
- Delta Air Lines (IATA airline code: DL)
- Pangdonglai, retail corporation in Xuchang, Henan, China

=== Railroads ===
- Delaware–Lackawanna Railroad in Pennsylvania, U.S.
- District line, a London Underground line

== Places ==
- DL postcode area, Darlington, north-east England
- County Donegal, Ireland
- Delanggu railway station, a railway station in Indonesia (station code)
- Detroit Lakes, Minnesota, US

== Politics ==
- Democracy is Freedom – The Daisy, a former political party in Italy
- Drinking Liberally, a social organization that discusses politics in bars
- Liberal Democracy (France) (Démocratie Libérale), a former political party in France
- Rights and Freedom, a political party in Italy

== Sports ==
- Defensive lineman, an American/Canadian football player position
- Disabled list, the former name of the injured list, a list of injured baseball players
- Duckworth–Lewis method, a mathematical way to calculate the target score in cricket
- Deadlift, a powerlifting move
- Detroit Lions, a football team in the NFL
- Diamond League, track and field league

== Other uses ==
- Deputy Lieutenant, a British title
- Diaper lover, a fetish
- Dimension Lengthwise, an International standard size of an envelope (110mm × 220mm, holds 1/3 A4)
- Doctor of Letters, a university degree
- Down-low (disambiguation)
- Driver's license, an official document which states that a person may operate a motorized vehicle
- Number 550, in Roman numerals
- Sangihe and Talaud Islands (vehicle registration prefix DL)
