= Not Gay =

2015 book by Jane Ward

Not Gay: Sex Between Straight White Men
- Author: Jane Ward
- Language: English
- Subject: Homosexuality
- Published: 2015
- Publisher: New York University Press
- Publication place: United States
- ISBN: 978-1-4798-2517-2 (Paperback)

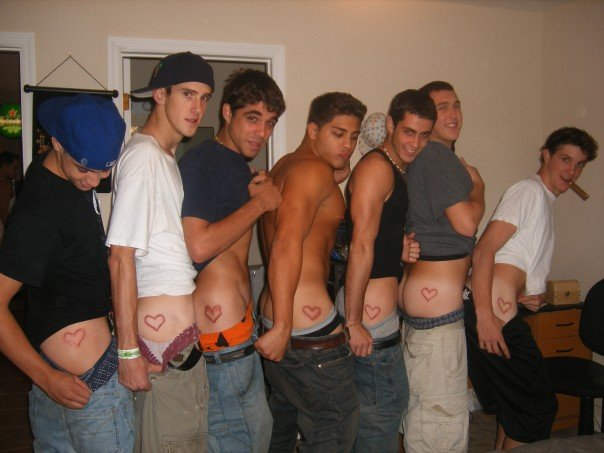
Members of a fraternity displaying their new heart brands

Not Gay: Sex Between Straight White Men is a 2015 book by Jane Ward, in which the author details the phenomenon of straight-identifying white men seeking out sex with other straight-identifying men despite not identifying as gay, bisexual, or bi-curious.

== Themes ==
Ward discusses hazing traditions such as the "elephant walk", a heterosexual bonding ritual that she describes as "notorious in the Greek system" in which "men are holding the penis of the guy behind them and they have their thumb in the butt of the guy in front of them." Such rituals can contribute to bringing teams or groups together and providing a feeling of belonging. This can also be achieved by permanent marking in the form of tattoos or brands. In contrast to these aspects of hazing, it can also become harmful or even abusive (including sexually abusive), and Ward explores the impulse that can lead young men to seek sexual dominance over others in unhealthy ways. Other examples of consensual sexual contact between heterosexual men explored by Ward include the circle jerk, straight men advertising online wanting to masturbate with other straight men, and "the long and clandestine history of straight men frequenting public restrooms for sexual encounters with other men." Ward examines the motivations of these men and how they reconcile their behaviors with their straight and heterosexual self-identity in differing circumstances, which includes enculturation into a new community and "situational homosexuality" in single sex environments such as prisons and the military. The book features excerpts from Craigslist personal ads, and discusses a number of reasons why straight men might seek out sex with other men, such as fear of being rejected by women, or finding women's bodies gross.

The term "bro-job" (a portmanteau of the words "bro" and "blowjob") refers to a sexual encounter between two straight men who are often close friends. Ward expresses the view that "bro-jobs" are not an indication that a man is actually gay, but rather a means for straight men to explore their own sexual identity. Despite having been credited with coining the term bro-job, Ward clarified:

I do describe in the book what could arguably be called bro-jobs, but I never once use that word. ... It's sort of like a game of telephone, four blogs down the line I'm reading stuff that says "Jane Ward has written an entire book about bro-jobs." I just had to laugh.

== Awards ==
Not Gay was one of eight finalists for a 2016 Lambda Literary Award in the category of LGBT studies. The award was given to the book A Taste for Brown Bodies: Gay Modernity and Cosmopolitan Desire by Hiram Pérez.

== Response ==
Rob Redding's book The Professor: Witnessing White Power uses empiricism to surmise that sleeping with white men – either straight or gay – gave some of the most prominent black men of the 20th century like James Baldwin, Jean-Michel Basquiat, Marvin Gaye and Richard Pryor a fearlessness when dealing with racist whites. Redding, who is black, utilizes a mix of communication theories like proxemics, kinesics and haptics, along with analysis of Jane Ward's book as a case study to explore how interracial relationships between men can be transformative for the black community. He states: "Ward, who is a lesbian, writes about power exchanges between white men. The Professor explores how gay interracial relationships and encounters may have empirically had an impact on the black community."

Author and LGBT sex advice columnist Dan Savage has written that "the men Jane Ward studied might not be gay – gayness could be ruled out in some cases – but straight-identified, married-to-women guys who have sex with other men are likelier to be bisexual, closeted or not, than they are to be straight, fluidity or otherwise." Ward has responded to such comments, and to suggestions that her work contributes to bi erasure, by noting the distinction between sexual identity and behavior. Some of the sexual activities that Ward described are framed in homophobia (bonding activities whereby participants "loudly declare how disgusting the activity is," for example, while simultaneously displaying pleasure and enjoyment) or misogyny, whereby some straight men express desire for heterosexual sex while simultaneously expressing "[open] disgust about women's bodies" or contempt for women as inherently inferior – another example of the dichotomy is seen in sugar daddy-type relationships. Ward argues that bisexuality is much broader than a category based on a person's sexual acts and that she is describing "straight-identified men who have no interest in bi-identification whatsoever and who are completely invested in hetero-normativity and who don't even understand the contact that they're having as particularly sexual." Their sexual orientation is separated from their behavior in part because they have no interest whatsoever in engaging with or belonging to Queer subculture, with its anti-normative practices and attitudes. In fact, Ward argues that these men inhabit a social space where their same-sex behavior "reaffirms rather than challenges" their sexual and gender identities. Ward's book deliberately focuses on straight white males, who she sees as having been overlooked in examinations of sexual fluidity. Discussions of Black and Latino men on the "down low" fostered the incorrect impression that straight men engaging in same-sex sexual activity is not part of the "normal" white culture; men who have sex with men come from all cultural and ethnic backgrounds. She argues that straight white men use their same-sex sexual activities "to leverage whiteness and masculinity to authenticate their heterosexuality in the context of sex with men. By understanding their same-sex sexual practice as meaningless, accidental, or even necessary, straight white men can perform homosexual contact in heterosexual ways."

== See also ==
- Down-low
- Manosphere
- Homosociality
- No homo
