= The Cat in the Hat (2003 film) =

Film by Bo Welch

Dr. Seuss' The Cat in the Hat
- Theatrical release poster
- Directed by: Bo Welch
- Screenplay by: Alec Berg; David Mandel; Jeff Schaffer
- Based on: The Cat in the Hat by Dr. Seuss
- Produced by: Brian Grazer
- Starring: Mike Myers; Alec Baldwin; Kelly Preston; Dakota Fanning; Spencer Breslin; Amy Hill; Sean Hayes
- Cinematography: Emmanuel Lubezki
- Edited by: Don Zimmerman
- Music by: David Newman (Note: In early posters and trailers for the film, Marc Shaiman is listed as the composer.)
- Production companies: Universal Pictures; DreamWorks Pictures; Imagine Entertainment (Note: Universal Pictures and DreamWorks Pictures are credited as the co-financers and co-production companies for The Cat in the Hat, while Imagine Entertainment is credited as the production company.)
- Distributed by: Universal Pictures (United States and Canada); DreamWorks Distribution, LLC (Note: Distributed through United International Pictures) (International)
- Release dates: November 8, 2003 (Universal City); November 21, 2003 (United States)
- Running time: 82 minutes
- Country: United States (Note: Attributed to multiple sources:)
- Language: English
- Budget: $109 million
- Box office: $134 million

Dr. Seuss' The Cat in the Hat (or simply The Cat in the Hat) is a 2003 American fantasy comedy film loosely based on the 1957 book of the same name by Dr. Seuss. Directed by Bo Welch and written by Alec Berg, David Mandel and Jeff Schaffer, the film stars Mike Myers as the titular character, alongside Alec Baldwin, Kelly Preston, Dakota Fanning and Spencer Breslin. It is the second and final live-action film adaptation of a Dr. Seuss book after How the Grinch Stole Christmas (2000). The story follows siblings Sally and Conrad Walden getting paid a visit by the Cat in the Hat, who plans to lighten up their rainy day with activities that ensue mayhem.

DreamWorks Pictures originally acquired the film rights to the book in June 1996, although production did not begin until after the 2000 live-action film adaptation of How the Grinch Stole Christmas was commercially successful. Several actors were considered for the titular character, before Myers landed the role in March 2002. Principal photography commenced mostly in California from October 2002 to January 2003, and 24 houses were constructed for the film's primary setting. David Newman composed the score for the film, while Marc Shaiman and Scott Wittman wrote two original songs for the film.

The Cat in the Hat premiered in Universal City, California, on November 8, 2003, and was released in North American theaters by Universal Pictures two weeks later on November 21. The film received largely negative reviews from critics, and was a box-office disappointment, grossing $134 million against its $109 million budget. Seuss's widow, Audrey Geisel was dissatisfied with the final product and because of that, she prohibited any further live-action film adaptations of her husband's works, including a planned sequel, The Cat in the Hat Comes Back, also the sequel to The Cat in the Hat book.

The film was nominated for eight awards at the 24th Golden Raspberry Awards, including Worst Picture and Worst Director, as well as two awards at the 25th and 30th Golden Raspberry Awards.

== Plot ==
Conrad and Sally Walden live in the city of Anville with their mother Joan, who works for neat-freak Hank Humberfloob as a real estate agent and is dating their next-door neighbor Larry Quinn. One day, Joan leaves her children at home with a lethargic babysitter, Mrs. Kwan, while she goes to the office, forbidding them to enter the living room, which is being kept pristine for her company's bimonthly Meet & Greet office party which she is hosting that night.

After Mrs. Kwan falls asleep, Sally and Conrad meet the Cat in the Hat, a sarcastic, wisecracking humanoid cat with a red-and-white striped top hat and a large red bow tie, who wants to teach them how to have fun despite the objections of the family's pet fish. In the process, the Cat leaves a trail of destruction throughout the house and releases twin troublemakers, Thing 1 and Thing 2, from a red crate which he locks and forbids the children to tamper with, explaining that it is a portal to his world. Despite the Cat's warning, Conrad picks the crab lock on the crate, which grabs onto the collar of the family dog Nevins, who runs off. The trio leaves the house and sets off to search for Nevins and get the lock back.

Meanwhile, Larry is revealed to be a rude and unemployed slob in debt due to being too lazy to work for a living, and is pretending to be a successful salesman in order to marry Joan for her wealth, as well as planning to send Conrad to military school so that he can get him out of the picture. Larry sees Nevins and kidnaps him, but the trio drives in the Cat's super-powered car after them and the Cat tricks him into returning the dog. When Larry tells Joan, the trio has the Things stall them by posing as police officers, but Larry races after them.

When the trio return to the house, Larry cuts the children off and orders them inside, where he sneezes uncontrollably due to his cat allergy. The Cat takes advantage of it and scares him, only for them to find that the house has been transformed into "The Mother of All Messes", with Larry falling into a purple gooey abyss. The Cat, Sally, and Conrad ride on the still sleeping Mrs. Kwan and navigate through the surreal house to find the crate and lock it, whereupon the house returns to its normal proportions but immediately collapses. In a heated argument, the children discover that the Cat planned the whole day and furiously order him to leave.

Conrad and Sally realize their mistake and resign themselves to facing the consequences when Joan comes home, but the Cat returns with a cleaning invention and, with the help of the Things, fixes the house. Conrad and Sally reconcile with the Cat and thank him for everything, and he departs just as Joan arrives. Larry, having survived the fall and merely covered in goo, comes in, thinking he has busted the children, and tries to tell Joan about the mess and the Cat's world. Joan, having seen the clean house, does not believe his story and says that Conrad, while indeed a troublemaker, is nice on the inside before outrightly dumping Larry, much to his humiliation and dismay. After the successful party, Joan spends time with her children by jumping on the couch with them, while the Cat and the Things walk off into the sunset.

== Cast ==
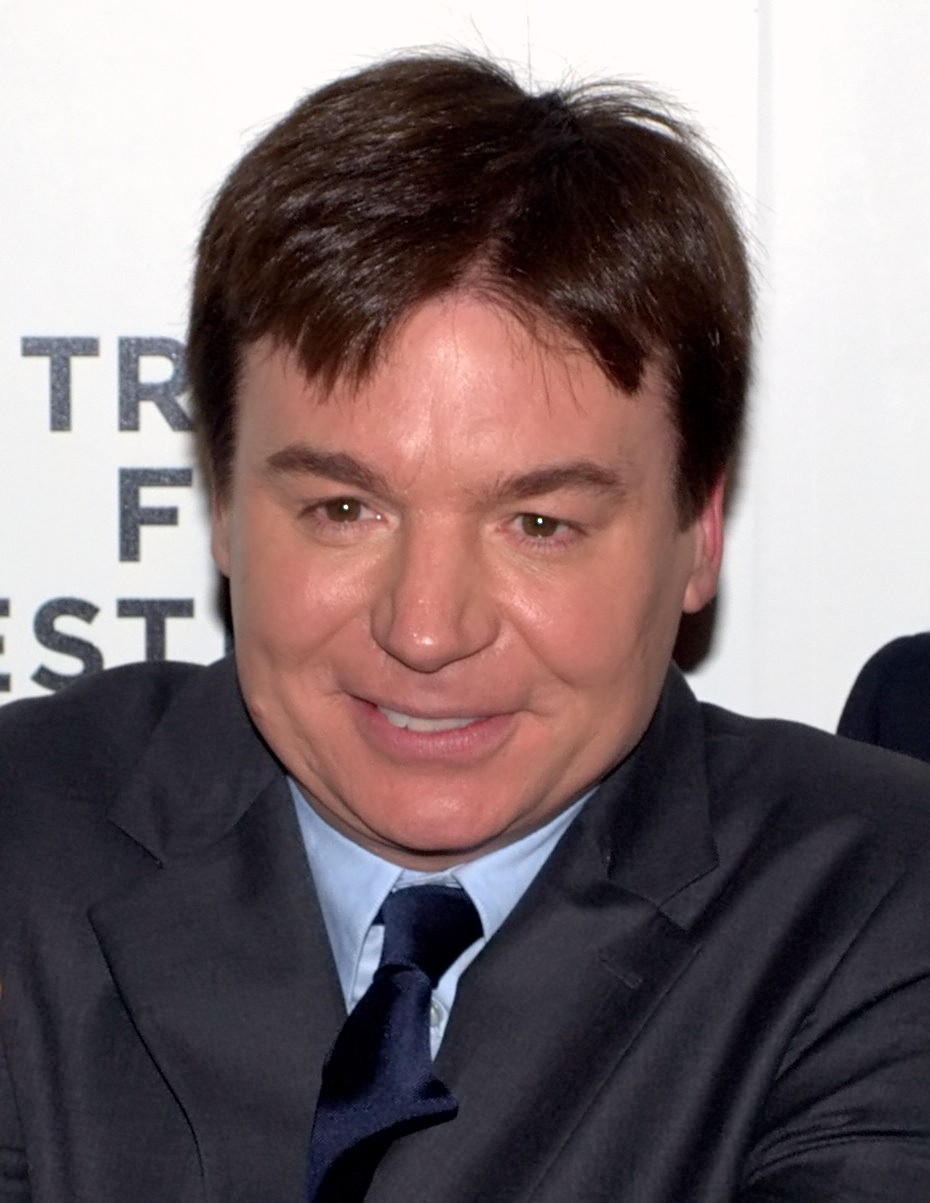
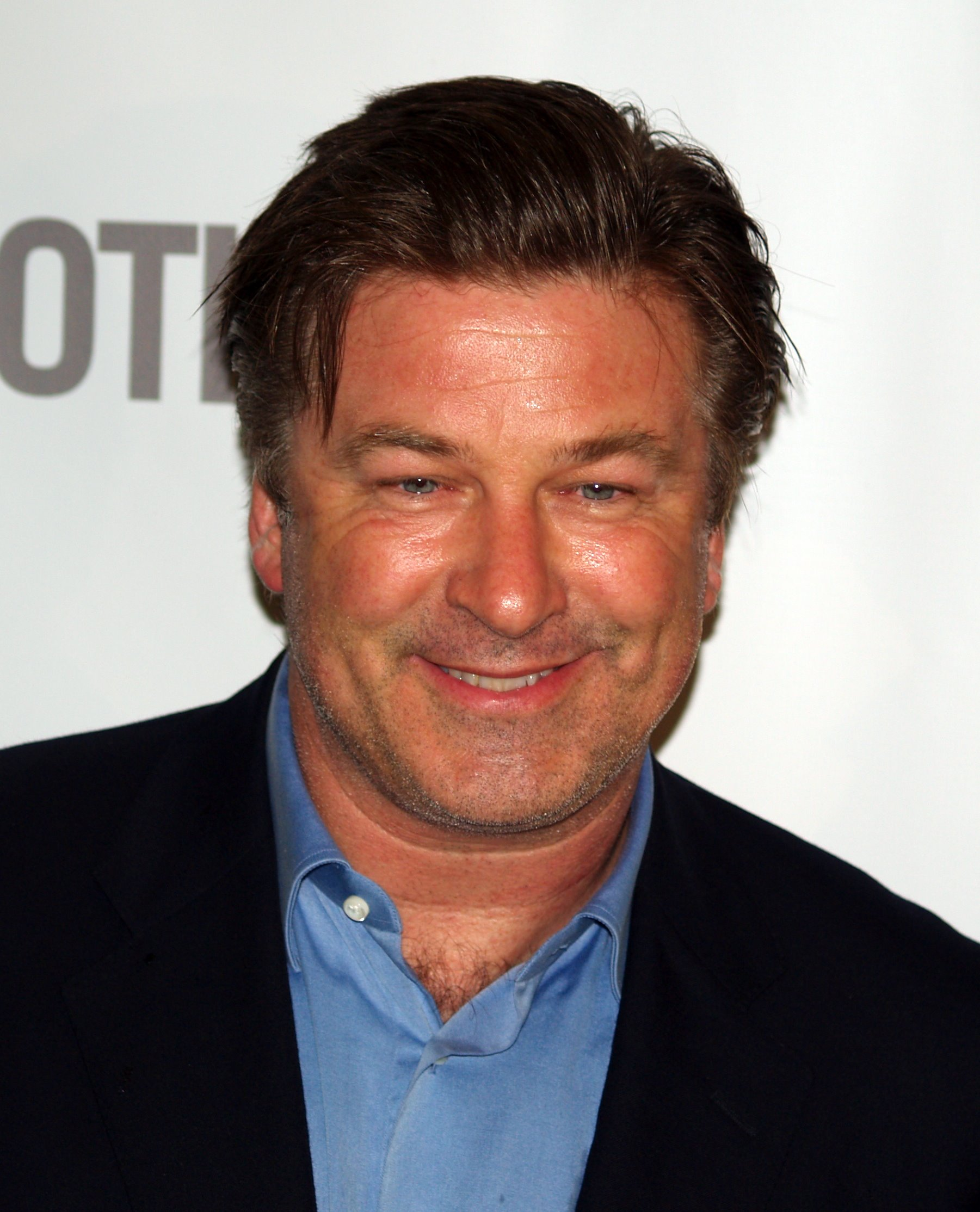
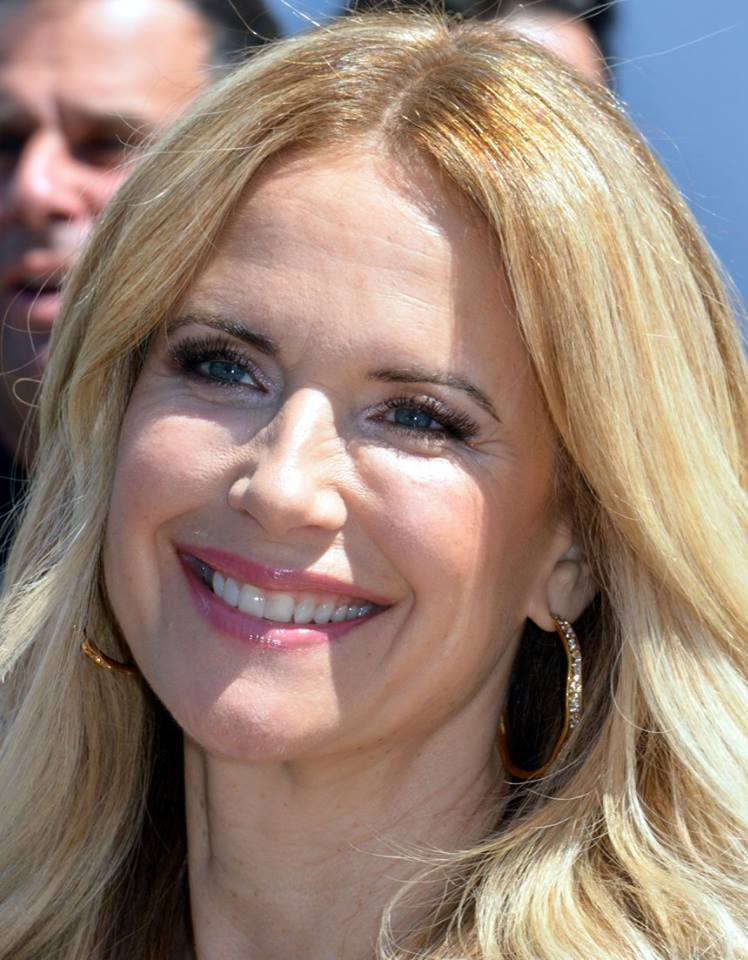
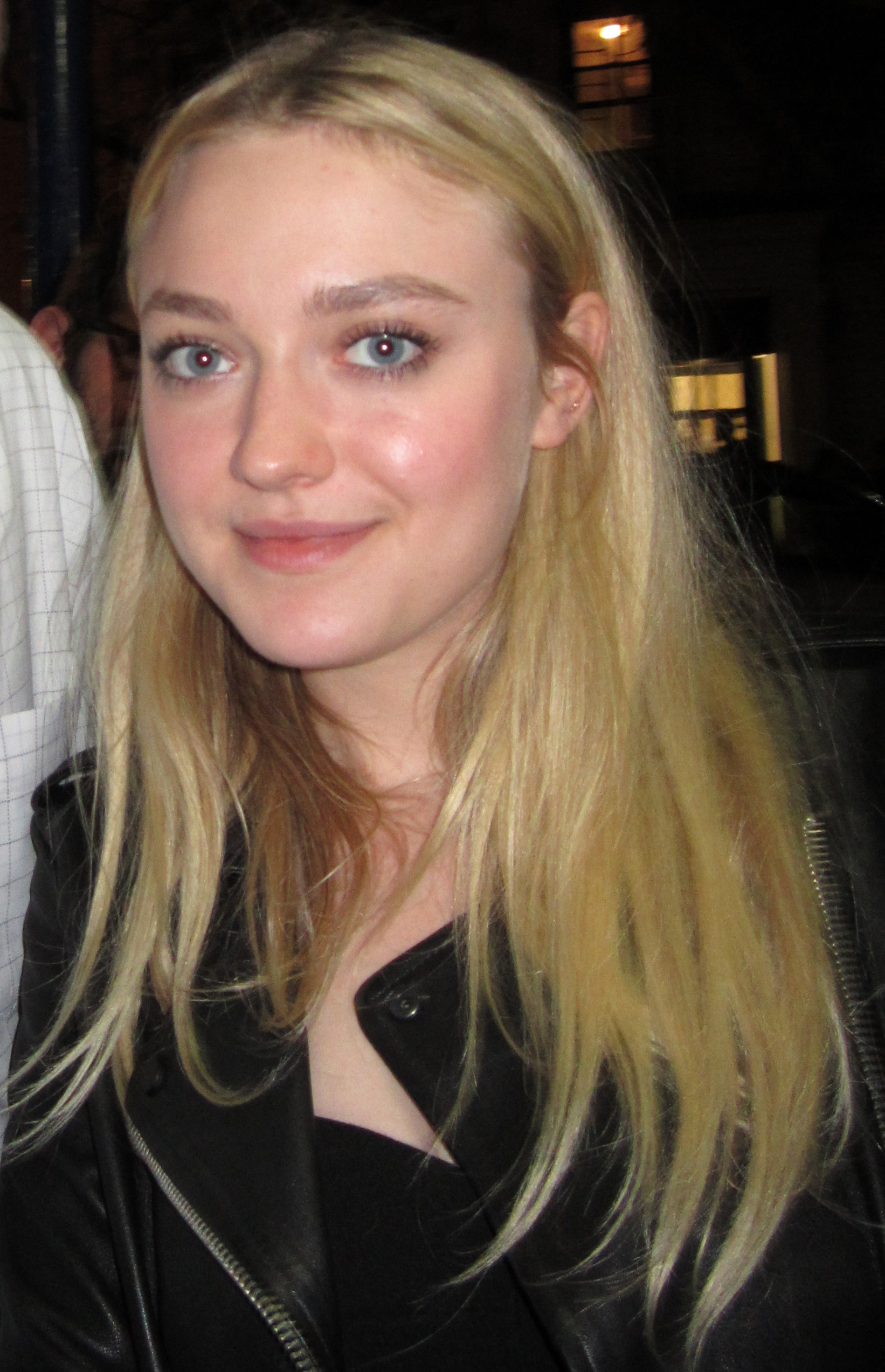
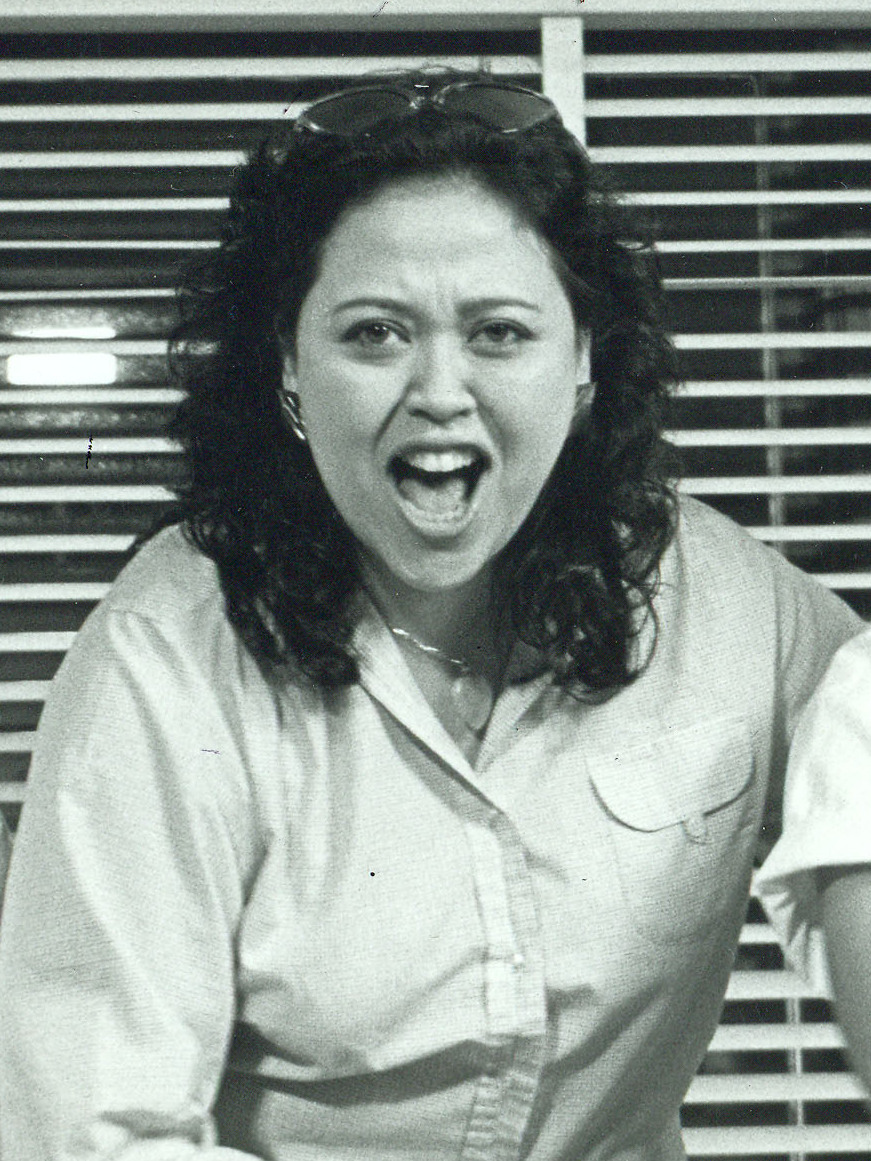
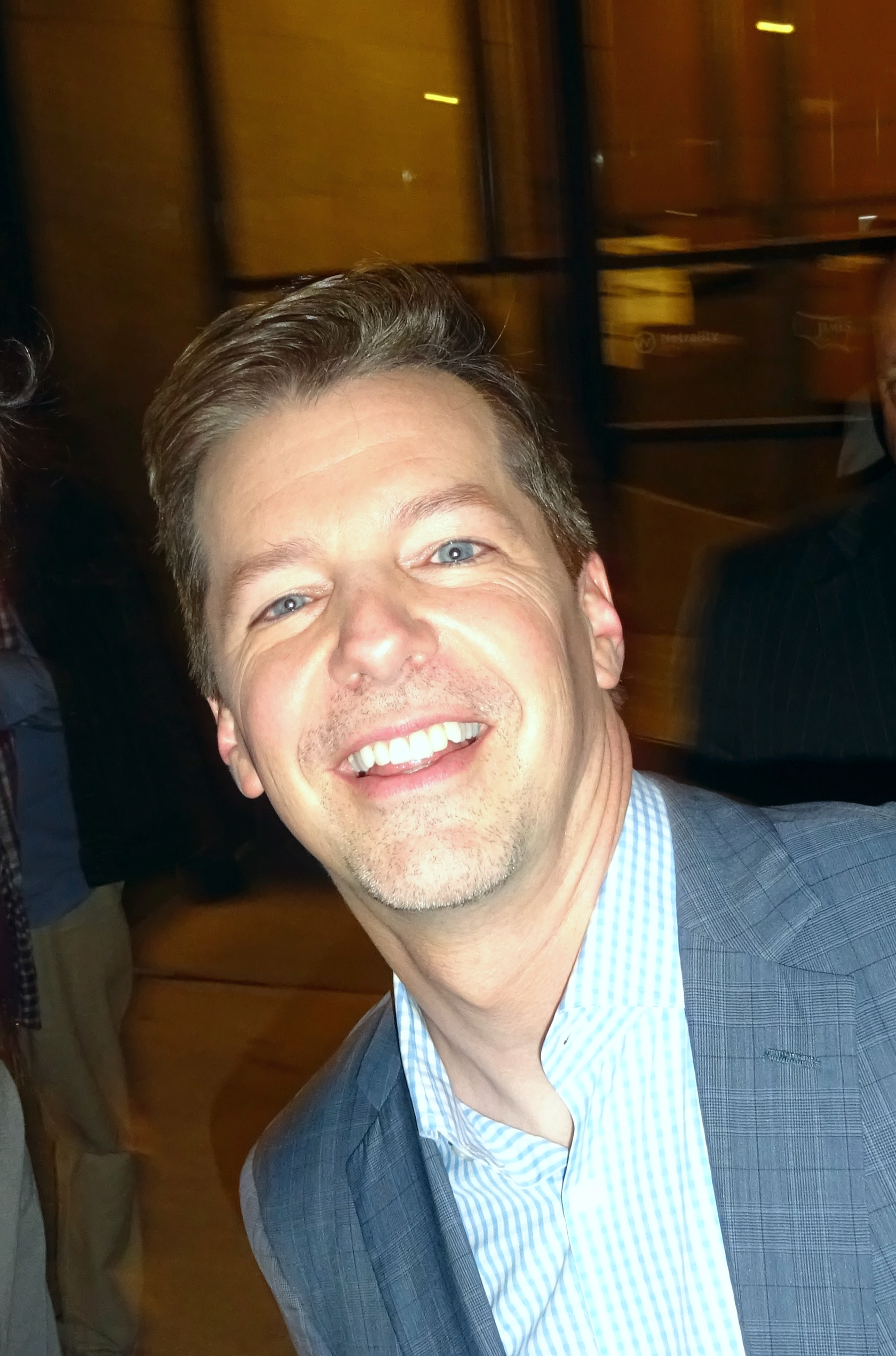
Top: Mike Myers and Alec Baldwin play the characters the Cat in the Hat and Larry Quinn.
Middle: Kelly Preston and Dakota Fanning play Joan and Sally Walden.
Bottom: Amy Hill and Sean Hayes play the characters Mrs. Kwan and the Fish. Hayes also plays Mr. Hank Humberfloob.
- Mike Myers as the Cat in the Hat, a wisecracking anthropomorphic cat who wears an oversized red bow-tie and a magical red-and-white striped top-hat containing comical gadgets.
- Alec Baldwin as Lawrence "Larry" Quinn, the Waldens' arrogant, lazy, unscrupulous, and unemployed next-door neighbor. He is allergic to cats which makes him sneeze, steals food from the Waldens, and is determined to marry Joan to mooch off of her wealth and send Conrad to military school to get rid of him.
- Kelly Preston as Joan Walden (credited as "Mom"), Conrad and Sally's mother, a workaholic real estate agent for Humberfloob's Real Estate.
- Dakota Fanning as Sally Walden, Joan's dull, somewhat bossy, well-behaved and rule-obeying 8-year-old daughter, and the younger sister of Conrad.
- Spencer Breslin as Conrad Walden, Joan's imaginative, yet destructive and misbehaved 12-year-old son, and the older brother of Sally.
- Amy Hill as Mrs. Kwan, an overweight and elderly Taiwanese woman who was hired to watch the children, but sleeps through her job, which serves as a running gag along with her weight.
- Sean Hayes as:
  - Mr. Hank Humberfloob, Joan's germophobic boss. He is seemingly friendly, but is quick to fire employees for the smallest infractions, often in a loud tone of voice.
  - Voice of the Fish, the Waldens' somewhat cynical, pessimistic and sensible pet goldfish.
- Danielle Chuchran and Taylor Rice as Thing 1, and Brittany Oaks and Talia-Lynn Prairie as Thing 2; two gibbering trouble-making creatures that the Cat brings in with him and only do the opposite of what they are told. Dan Castellaneta provided the voices for the Things.
- Clint Howard as Kate, the caterer of party food, such as brownies, cakes, etc.
- Paige Hurd as Denise, Sally's former best friend who does not invite her to her birthday party after an argument.
- Steven Anthony Lawrence as the Dumb Schweitzer, an intellectually and socially inferior pre-teen boy with a Bronx accent. When Cat disguises himself as the piñata at a birthday party Sally is left out of, he whacks Cat in the groin with a wooden bat. His name is not mentioned in the film, but it is included in the credits.
- Candace Dean Brown as a secretary who works for Humberfloob Real Estate.
- Paris Hilton as a female club-goer.
- Bugsy as Nevins, the Waldens' pet dog.
  - Frank Welker provided his voice.
- Victor Brandt as the Narrator; he is revealed to be the Cat using a voice-changer at the end of the film.

== Production ==
=== Development ===
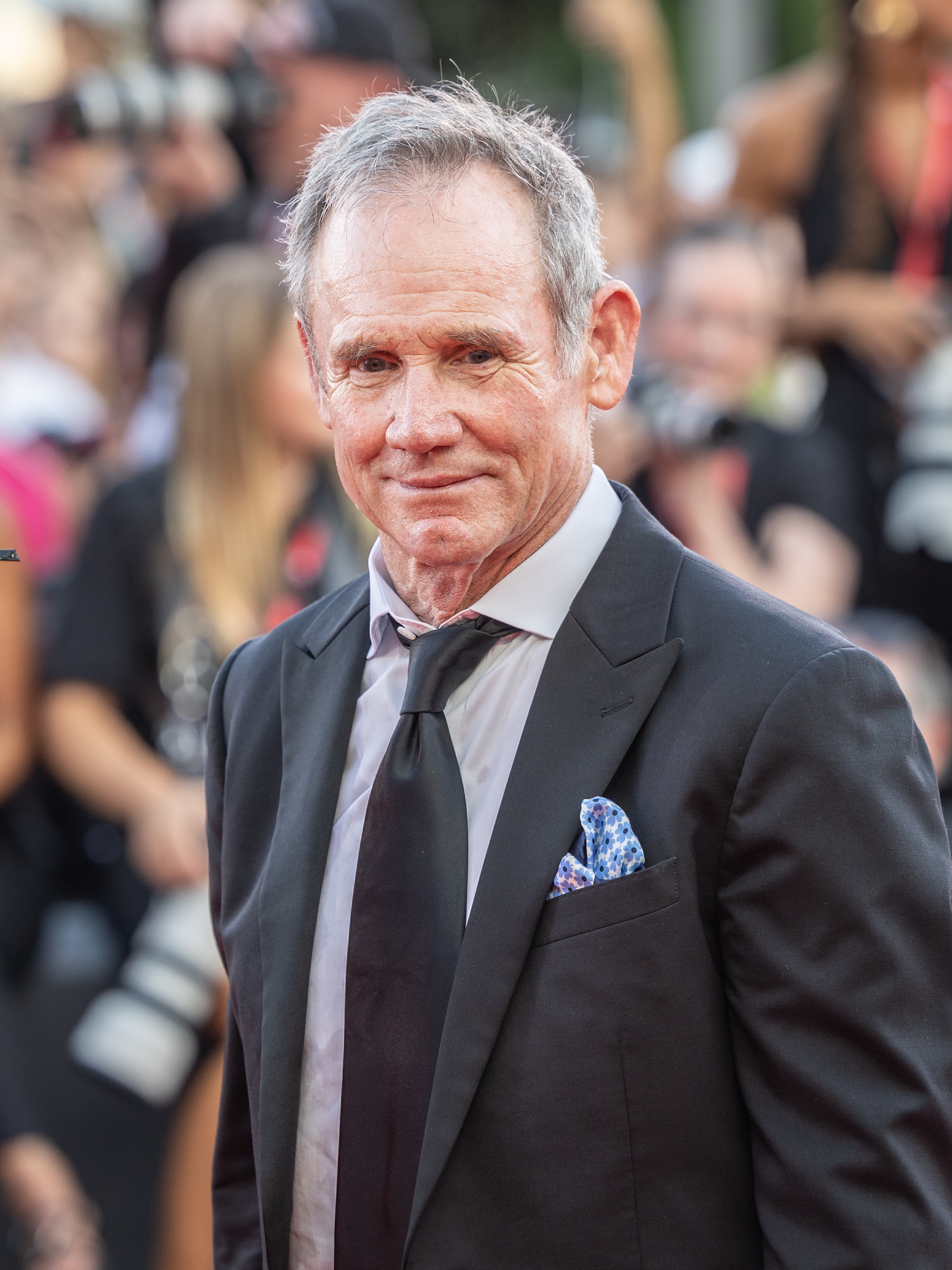
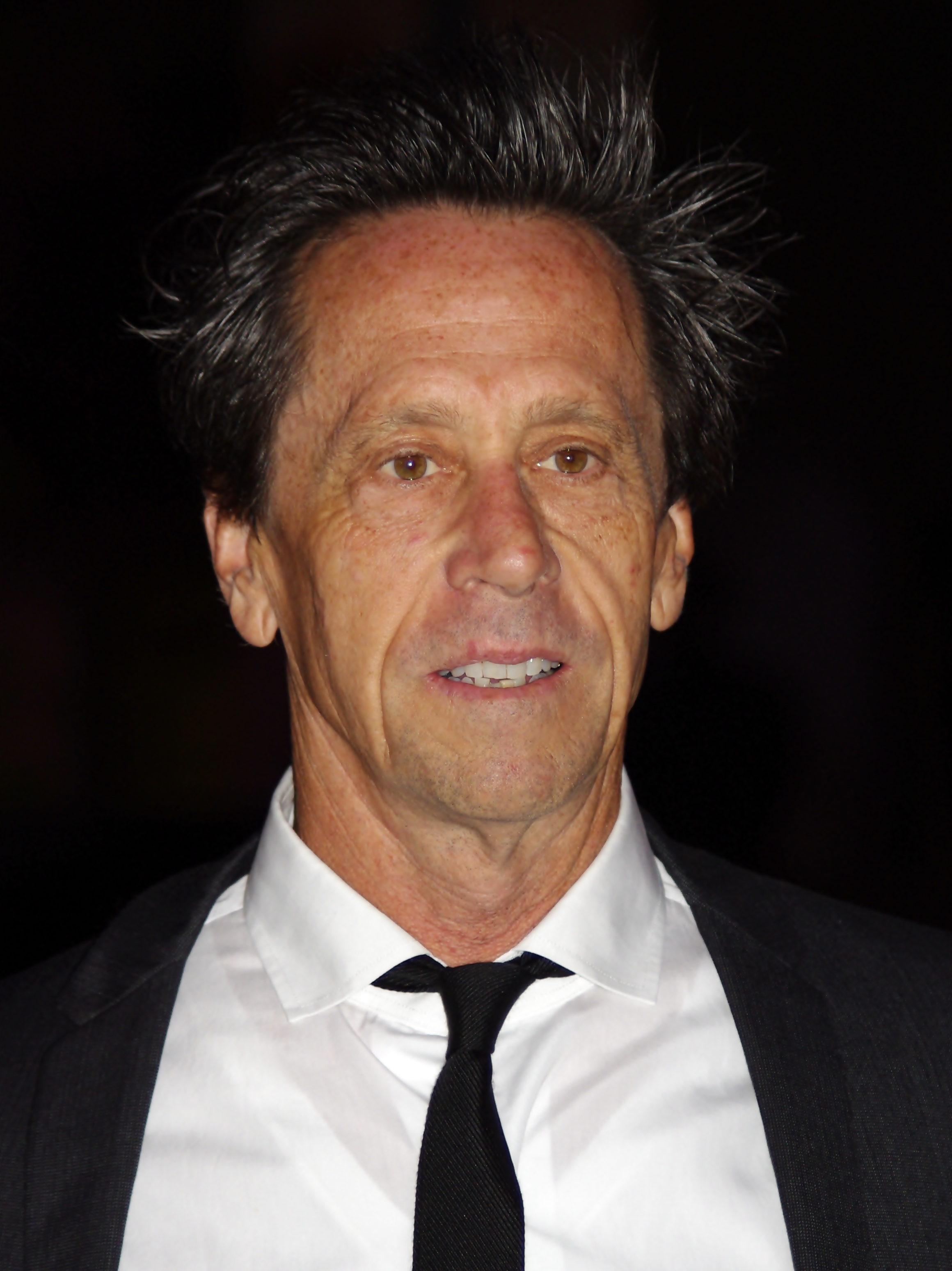
Director Bo Welch (left) and producer Brian Grazer (right).

DreamWorks Pictures originally acquired the film rights to Dr. Seuss' 1957 children's book The Cat in the Hat in June 1996 after filmmaker Steven Spielberg and screenwriter Eric Roth made several trips to Seuss's widow Audrey Geisel in her home in La Jolla. However, production did not officially start until after the 2000 film adaptation of Seuss' How the Grinch Stole Christmas! became a commercial success. Brian Grazer, the producer of The Grinch, stated: "Because we grew up with these books, and because they have such universal themes and the illustrations ignite such fantasy in your mind as a child—the aggregation of all those feelings—it leaves an indelible, positive memory. And so when I realized I had a chance to convert first The Grinch and then, The Cat in the Hat, into movies, I was willing to do anything to bring them to the screen." Grazer then contacted Bo Welch over the phone with the offer to direct the film, and he accepted. Although Welch and a publicist for star Mike Myers denied it, several people said Myers had considerable input into the film's direction by telling some of the cast (namely co-stars Alec Baldwin and Kelly Preston) how to perform their scenes. Screenwriters David Mandel and Alec Berg pitched the film as a child-friendly version of Ferris Bueller's Day Off.

=== Casting ===
Tim Allen was initially considered for the role of the Cat. The script was initially based on a version of the original book's story conceived by Allen, who said that as a child he was afraid of Seuss' "mischievous feline babysitter" and it was his dream to give the edge that scared him for the role. He described the Cat as a human who turns into a cat, like either a werewolf or a vampire, as he gets more frustrated with the children. However, the studio did not commission a screenplay until late February 2001, when Berg, Mandel, and Jeff Schaffer were hired by the studio to rewrite the film (replacing the original draft of the film that was written by Eric Roth a few years prior), so the film would not be ready to shoot before the deadline. By this point, Allen was also committed to shooting Walt Disney Pictures' The Santa Clause 2, which was also delayed because Allen wanted a script rewrite. Due to scheduling conflicts with that film, he dropped out of the role. Afterwards, Will Ferrell, Robin Williams, Adam Sandler, David Spade, Jerry Seinfeld, Martin Short (who would later voice the Cat in The Cat in the Hat Knows a Lot About That!), Dana Carvey and Billy Bob Thornton were considered for the role. However, in March 2002, the role of the Cat was given to Myers, whom Grazer had an argument with regarding a proposed film adaptation of Myers' Saturday Night Live sketch Sprockets, which Myers cancelled in June 2000 after being dissatisfied with his own script for it. Myers stated in an interview that he was a long-time fan of the original Dr. Seuss book, and that it was the first book he ever read. Myers was obligated to appear in the film as a result of a settlement related to the Sprockets film's cancellation. Soon after, Myers, Dave Foley, Jay Kogen and Stephen Hibbert did uncredited rewrites of the script. In April 2002, Dakota Fanning was selected to play the role of Sally. Peri Gilpin was originally attached to play Joan Walden, but was unable to do so due to scheduling conflicts with Frasier. The role of Joan Walden was given to Kelly Preston.

=== Visual effects and makeup ===
Originally, Rick Baker was set to be the prosthetic makeup designer for the film after his previous experience with How the Grinch Stole Christmas, but due to conflicts with the studio and production team, particularly with Myers' behavior (showing up late to meetings and refusing to come to makeup tests punctually) and the complex challenge of designing the character's makeup, he left the project. After Baker left, three candidates submitted makeup design proposals for the Cat and the Things: Kevin Yagher, Amalgamated Dynamics and Steve Johnson (one of Baker's earliest apprentices) were among them. Ultimately, Johnson was selected, and he took charge of the makeup. The Cat costume was made of angora and human hair and was fitted with a cooling system. To keep Myers cool during the outdoor shoots, a portable air conditioner was available that connected a hose to the suit between shots, while the tail and ears were battery-operated. Danielle Chuchran and Brittany Oaks, who portrayed Thing 1 and Thing 2, respectively, wore prosthetic face masks and wigs designed by Johnson as well. The Fish was considered somewhat of a unique character for Rhythm & Hues Studios, in that the character had no shoulders, hips or legs, so all of the physical performance had to emit from the eyes, head and fin motion. Sean Hayes, who provided the voice for the Fish, found the role significantly different from his usual on-camera jobs; he did not know how the final animation would look, resulting in all of his voice work taking place alone in a sound booth. The full-body Cat costume Myers wore on-screen in the film is now on sale, with bidding starting at $6,000 in Propstore's Los Angeles location as of August 26, 2026.

=== Filming ===
Before filming, giant props for the film were stolen from the set; the local police found the props vandalized with graffiti in a shopping mall car park in Pomona, California. No arrests were made. Principal photography took place mostly in California from October 2002 to January 2003. The neighborhood and the town center was filmed in a rural valley near Simi Valley, where 24 houses (each 26 feet square and 52 feet tall) were constructed. The downtown area outdoor shots were filmed along a Pomona street where a number of antique and gift shops are located. The community decided not to redecorate after filming ended, so the surreal paint scheme and some of the signage can still be seen today as it appears in the film. Because of so much smog in the area, the sky had to be digitally replaced with the cartoon-like sky and colors of the background had to be digitally fixed. Myers was unaware that a piece of the house would fall behind him near the end of the film during his scenes with Spencer Breslin and Fanning. His reaction was real and left unscripted in the final film.

According to co-star Amy Hill, Myers was difficult to work with on set. She called her experience "horrible, nightmarish", and said that Myers refused to talk to anyone on the production (other than Welch) and isolated himself from the cast and crew during breaks in filming. She mentioned that while Welch was "really lovely", he was a first-time director, so he would often let Myers decide whether a retake was needed or not. In addition, she stated that Myers had an assistant who held chocolates in a Tupperware, and whenever Myers needed a piece of chocolate, his assistant would come over and give him one.

== Music ==
The Cat in the Hat: Original Motion Picture Soundtrack

Film score by David Newman
- Released: November 28, 2003
- Recorded: 2003
- Studios: Newman Stage, 20th Century Fox
- Genre: Film score
- Length: 48:55
- Labels: Decca; UMG Soundtracks
- Producers: David Newman; Marc Shaiman

David Newman chronology
Duplex (2003)	The Cat in the Hat (2003)	Scooby-Doo 2: Monsters Unleashed (2004)

When production began, songs written by Randy Newman were dropped because they were deemed inferior; Newman's cousin and frequent collaborator of Grazer, David, instead composed the score for the film. The soundtrack was released on November 18, 2003, by Decca Records and UMG Soundtracks. Originally, Marc Shaiman was going to compose the score for the film, but due to Newman already being chosen for the film score, Shaiman instead wrote the film's songs with Scott Wittman. The soundtrack features a cover of the song "Getting Better" by the Beatles, performed by Smash Mouth; this marks the third film starring Mike Myers in a lead role to feature music by Smash Mouth, after Shrek (2001) and Austin Powers in Goldmember (2002). The trailer for the film uses a version of "Hey! Pachuco!" by the Royal Crown Revue. The soundtrack also includes two songs performed by Myers, who plays the Cat. Newman's score won a BMI Film Music Award. Hang On by Smash Mouth was also featured in the film, but it was not included in the soundtrack. Two tracks in the score, "Military Academy Seduction", and "Rescuing Nevens", included a reference to Jerry Goldsmith's soundtracks from the film, Dennis the Menace (1993). Just before the film's end credits roll, "Tangerine Speedo" by Chicago band Caviar (from their self-titled album) plays.

No.	Title	Writer(s)	Length
1.	"Main Title - the Kids"		8:07
2.	"Getting Better" (Smash Mouth)	Lennon–McCartney	2:24
3.	"The Cat"		3:50
4.	"Two Things - Couch Jumping - Leaky Crate"		5:16
5.	"Military Academy Seduction"		3:02
6.	"Mrs. Kwan - Mom Leaves"		2:12
7.	"Surfer Cat - the Phunometer"		2:22
8.	"Fun, Fun, Fun" (Mike Myers)	Marc Shaiman, Scott Wittman	2:38
9.	"The Contract"		1:53
10.	"Oven Explodes - "Clean Up This Mess!""		1:36
11.	"Things Wreck the House"		2:52
12.	"Larry the Slob"		3:10
13.	"Birthday Party"		2:11
14.	"S.L.O.W. Drive"		2:32
15.	"Rescuing Nevens"		4:27
16.	"Clean Up" (Mike Myers)	Marc Shaiman, Scott Wittman	0:24
Total length:			48:55

== Release ==
=== Theatrical ===
The Cat in the Hat held its world premiere in Universal City, California on November 8, 2003, and was later released theatrically in the United States and Canada by Universal Pictures on November 21, and internationally by DreamWorks Pictures.

=== Home media ===
The Cat in the Hat was released on VHS and DVD by Universal Studios Home Video on March 16, 2004, where it eventually gained more success selling more copies despite initially struggling due to many copies being shipped. The DVD release features 13 deleted scenes, 36 outtakes, 13 featurettes, a "Dance with the Cat" tutorial to teach children how to do a Cat in the Hat dance, and an audio commentary with director Bo Welch and actor Alec Baldwin. On February 7, 2012, the film was released on Blu-ray.

== Reception ==
=== Box office ===
The Cat in the Hat grossed $101 million in the United States and Canada, and $33 million in other territories, for a worldwide total of $134 million. Produced on a budget of $109 million, the film was considered an underperformance.

It opened on November 21, 2003, alongside Warner Bros. Pictures and Columbia Pictures's Gothika, and made $11.2 million on its first day. It went on to gross $38.3 million in its first weekend, ranking first at the North American box office ahead of Gothika, averaging $11,065 in 3,464 theaters, and made an additional $13 million throughout its first week, maintaining its number 1 position. During its five-day Thanksgiving weekend, it brought in an additional $32.9 million, beating out The Haunted Mansion, averaging $9,502 per theater, and grossed $24.4 million in its second week, for a decline of -36.2%.

In other territories, it opened in December 2003 in Mexico, Venezuela and Hong Kong. The film's highest-grossing international markets included the United Kingdom ($13.8 million), Mexico ($2.63 million), Germany ($1.62 million), New Zealand ($1.02 million), Spain ($665,128), France ($506,362), Russia ($498,139), and Brazil ($449,970).

=== Critical response ===
On the review aggregation website Rotten Tomatoes, 11% of 149 critics' reviews are positive with an average rating of 3.4/10. The website's consensus reads, "Filled with double entendres and potty humor, this Cat falls flat." Metacritic assigned the film a weighted average score of 19 out of 100, based on 37 critics, indicating "overwhelming dislike". Audiences polled by CinemaScore gave the film an average grade of "B-" on an A+ to F scale.

Peter Travers of Rolling Stone gave the film one star, stating: "Cat, another overblown Hollywood raid on Dr. Seuss, has a draw on Mike Myers, who inexplicably plays the Cat by mimicking Bert Lahr in The Wizard of Oz." Roger Ebert of The Chicago Sun-Times gave the film two out of four stars. Although he praised the production design, he considered the film to be "all effects and stunts and CGI and prosthetics, with no room for lightness and joy". Ebert and co-host Richard Roeper gave the film "Two Thumbs Down" on their weekly movie review program. Roeper said of Myers's performance that "maybe a part of him was realizing as the movie was being made that a live-action version of The Cat in the Hat just wasn't a great idea". Ebert compared the film unfavorably to How the Grinch Stole Christmas: "If there is one thing I've learned from these two movies, it's that we don't want to see Jim Carrey as a Grinch, and we don't want to see Mike Myers as a cat. These are talented comedians, let's see them do their stuff, don't bury them under a ton of technology."

Leonard Maltin gave the film one-and-a-half stars out of four in his Movie Guide: "Brightly colored adaptation of the beloved rhyming book for young children is a betrayal of everything Dr. Seuss ever stood for, injecting potty humor and adult (wink-wink) jokes into a mixture of heavy-handed slapstick and silliness." Maltin also said that the film's official title which included Dr. Seuss' The Cat in the Hat was "an official insult".

Todd McCarthy of Variety praised the film as "attractively designed, energetically performed and, above all, blessedly concise."

In the film's DVD commentary, Alec Baldwin addressed complaints the film received because of its dissimilarity to the source material. He expressed a belief that a film is "an idea about something" and that because Dr. Seuss' work is so unique, making a feature-length film out of one of his stories would entail taking liberties and making broad interpretations.

=== Accolades ===
Award	Subject	Nominee	Result	Ref.
BMI Film Awards	Best Music	David Newman	Won	
Kids' Choice Awards	Favorite Movie Actor	Mike Myers	Nominated	
Golden Raspberry Awards	Worst Actor of the Decade	Mike Myers	Nominated	
Golden Raspberry Awards	Worst Actor	Mike Myers	Nominated	
Golden Raspberry Awards	Worst Supporting Actor	Alec Baldwin	Nominated	
Golden Raspberry Awards	Worst Supporting Actress	Kelly Preston	Nominated	
Golden Raspberry Awards	Worst Picture		Nominated	
Golden Raspberry Awards	Worst Screenplay	Alec Berg, David Mandel and Jeff Schaffer, based on the book by Dr. Seuss	Nominated	
Golden Raspberry Awards	Worst Screen Couple	Mike Myers and either Thing One or Thing Two	Nominated	
Golden Raspberry Awards	Worst Excuse for an Actual Movie (All Concept/No Content)		Won	
Golden Raspberry Awards	Worst "Comedy" of Our First 25 Years		Nominated	
Stinkers Bad Movie Awards	Worst Picture		Won	
Stinkers Bad Movie Awards	Worst Director	Bo Welch	Nominated	
Stinkers Bad Movie Awards	Worst Screenplay for a Film Grossing More Than $100 Million Worldwide	Alec Berg, David Mandel and Jeff Schaffer, based on the book by Dr. Seuss	Won	
Stinkers Bad Movie Awards	Worst Actor	Mike Myers	Nominated	
Stinkers Bad Movie Awards	Worst Fake Accent - Male	Mike Myers	Nominated	
Stinkers Bad Movie Awards	Worst Supporting Actor	Alec Baldwin	Nominated	
Stinkers Bad Movie Awards	Most Painfully Unfunny Comedy		Nominated	
Stinkers Bad Movie Awards	Worst Song	"Fun, Fun, Fun"; music by Marc Shaiman, lyrics by Shaiman and Scott Wittman	Nominated	
Stinkers Bad Movie Awards	Most Annoying Non-Human Character	Cat in the Hat	Won	
Stinkers Bad Movie Awards	Most Annoying Non-Human Character	Thing One and Thing Two (voices by Dan Castellaneta)	Nominated	
Stinkers Bad Movie Awards	Worst Performance by a Child Actor	Spencer Breslin	Won	
Stinkers Bad Movie Awards	Worst Performance by a Child Actor	Dakota Fanning	Nominated	

The film also received three nominations at the Hollywood Makeup & Hairstylists Guild Awards.

== Legacy ==
=== Retrospective ===
In a 2023 interview with Syfy Magazine, Welch defended the film, feeling it was "weird and funny and anarchic […] there's a craziness to it that I think people can embrace." Writing for social networking website Letterboxd, Jack Moulton wrote, "The Cat in the Hat may not have been parent-friendly, but it was kid-friendly in ways studios did not anticipate in 2003". He mentioned there was "a weirder niche of younger audiences vibing with [the film's] colorful gooey world [and] the irreverence of Cat's crude 'tude." Reflecting on the film's "divisive" nature on the site, with a 2.5/5 average user rating, Moulton felt that despite "[the] litany of gag reviews […] we're in the post-ironic era where that can translate into a genuine love." Calum Russell of Far Out felt that the film possessed an "idiosyncratic brand of humour that was surprisingly ahead of its time," and "[couldn't] help but think this is exactly what a contemporary adaptation of The Cat in the Hat would be like if it was released today."

=== Canceled sequel ===
On the day of the film's release, Myers stated in an interview that he expected a sequel where the children meet the Cat again. A sequel based on the original book's sequel The Cat in the Hat Comes Back was in development just over a month before the film's release, with Myers and Welch to return to their duties as actor and director, respectively. Berg stated that writing a sequel would be difficult as the film had borrowed some elements from the second book. Following the film's negative reception, Seuss's widow, Audrey Geisel, halted any future live-action film adaptations of Seuss's works during her lifetime, including the planned sequel.

=== Internet trend ===
In 2026, the film gained a resurgence of popularity on social media platforms, including TikTok, due to a viral trend showing scenes from the film in black-and-white with dark humor captions. In August 2026, AI-generated images and videos of a person dressed as the Cat in the Hat in the streets, usually with threatening captions, went viral. Police officials in Wexford, Kentucky, South Yorkshire, Colorado, and Bandera County, Texas have issued statements warning people about the trend, as some posts have named and threatened specific people and communities. A teenager in Grand Junction, Colorado was arrested after allegedly posting one of the videos, as well as a teenager in Allen County, Kentucky.

== Video game ==
A platform game based on the film was published by Vivendi Universal Games for PlayStation 2, Xbox, and Game Boy Advance on November 5, 2003, and Microsoft Windows on November 9, shortly before the film's North American theatrical release. The game received mixed reviews from critics, some considered it better than the film.

== See also ==
- List of works based on Dr. Seuss stories
