= Jane Ward =

American writer

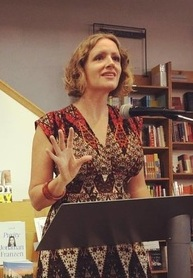
- Jane Ward gives a lecture at Skylight Books in Los Angeles on September 8, 2015.
- Born: October 15, 1973 (age 52)
- Spouse: Kat Ross

Academic background
- Education: University of California, Santa Barbara

Academic work
- Discipline: Feminist and Queer Studies

Jane Ward is an American feminist scholar and author. Ward is Professor and Chair of Feminist Studies at the University of California, Santa Barbara. She is known for her work on the social construction of sexuality and whiteness. Ward's research is detailed in her books, including Not Gay: Sex between Straight White Men, and The Tragedy of Heterosexuality, which won the 2021 PROSE Award.

== Personal life ==
Ward is Professor and Chair of Feminist Studies at the University of California, Santa Barbara. Ward received her PhD in sociology from the University of California, Santa Barbara in 2003.

Ward is known for her books The Tragedy of Heterosexuality (New York University Press, 2020), a 2021 PROSE Award Winner, and Not Gay: Sex Between Straight White Men (NYU Press, 2015), a 2016 Lambda Literary Award Finalist. Ward's research has been featured in The New York Times, BBC, NPR, New York Magazine, The Guardian, Forbes, Salon, Newsweek, Huffington Post, Cosmopolitan, and Vice. Her 2008 book Respectably Queer: Diversity Culture in LGBT Activist Organizations was named a favorite book of 2008 by The Progressive magazine.

She lives in Southern California with her partner Kat Ross. Ward's published work focuses on a broad range of topics, from feminist pornography, queer parenting, and the racial politics of same-sex marriage, to the social construction of heterosexuality and whiteness.

== Work ==
Ward's first book, Respectably Queer, is based on her observations of three different queer organizations: the Los Angeles Gay and Lesbian Center, Bienestar, and Los Angeles-Christopher Street West. Her second book, Not Gay, received positive reviews from New York Magazine and many other outlets. Singal states "[Ward] shows that homosexual contact has been a regular feature of heterosexual life ever since the concepts of homo- and heterosexuality were first created—not just in prisons and frat houses and the military, but in biker gangs and even conservative suburban neighborhoods."

In Not Gay, Ward examines same-sex encounters between men who are considered to be heterosexual. Questions that frame her analysis include "does having sexual encounters with men automatically mean that men are gay or bisexual?" To answer such questions, she traces American history to the 1950s, examining same-sex encounters such as those in public bathrooms. Ward also uses sociological, psychological, and historical research to link gender and sexuality to race, focusing on the perceived heterosexuality of white men who have sexual encounters with other white men. Ward's work in Not Gay presents a perspective on opposite couple attraction and a new outlook on heterosexual masculinity. In 2016, Ward published a feminist response to gay male critics of the book. Not Gay was translated into German and published by Mannerschwarm Verlag in 2018.

In 2020, Ward published her third book, entitled The Tragedy of Heterosexuality, winner of the 2021 PROSE Award in Cultural Anthropology and Sociology. As described by a reviewer for The New York Times, “The Tragedy of Heterosexuality wastes absolutely no time getting to the point, but while many of the sentences (including the title) made me laugh out loud, it is at heart a somber, urgent academic examination of the many ways in which opposite-sex coupling can hurt the very individuals who cling to it most." The book was published in Korean in 2026.

Ward is the co-editor, with Soma Chaudhuri, of a global feminist collection of academic and popular essays about witches and witchcraft, The Witch Studies Reader, described in 2025 by Library Journal as a "set[ting] fire to the binary concepts that create opposition between religion and magic, the secular and the sacred, and critical thinking and magical belief.".

Her course in straightness studies at UCSB is one of the first of its kind and was profiled in The Cut in 2025.

== Publications ==
- Ward, Elizabeth Jane (2008). Respectably Queer: Diversity Culture in LGBT Activist Organizations. Vanderbilt University Press. ISBN 978-0-8265-1607-7.
- Ward, Jane (2015-07-31). Not Gay: Sex between Straight White Men (Sexual Cultures, 19). NYU Press. ISBN 978-1-4798-2517-2.
- Ward, Jane (2020). The Tragedy of Heterosexuality. NYU Press. ISBN 978-1-4798-9506-9.
- Ward, Jane and Chaudhuri, Soma (eds.) (2025). The Witch Studies Reader. Duke University Press. ISBN 978-1-4780-2813-0.

== See also ==
- Feminism
- Queer Studies
- Human sexuality
- Human male sexuality
