= Caviar (album) =

Studio album by Caviar
- Released: August 29, 2000
- Label: Bomb Trax/Island
- Producer: Johnny K, Andy Gerber

Caviar chronology
Caviar (2000)	Thin Mercury Sound (2004)

Singles from Caviar
- 1. "Tangerine Speedo" Released: 2000

Professional ratings
Review scores
Source	Rating
AllMusic	4/5 stars

Caviar is the debut album by the American band Caviar. It was released on August 29, 2000, by Island Records. The first single was "Tangerine Speedo", which also appeared on the soundtrack to the film Charlie's Angels and its end credits. "Tangerine Speedo" is played during the end credits of The Cat in the Hat.

== Track listing ==
All tracks by Caviar except where noted

1. "Ok Nightmare" – 4:15
2. "Goldmine" – 3:36
3. "Tangerine Speedo" (Dominguez, Caviar) – 3:39
4. "The Good Times Are Over" (Caviar, Pee Wee King, Chilton Price, Redd Stewart) – 3:34
5. "I Thought I Was Found" – 4:35
6. "Flawed Like a Diamond" – 3:43
7. "Going Out Tonight" – 3:59
8. "Sugarless" (Brown, Caviar) – 3:07
9. "Automatic Yawns" – 3:12
10. "Looked So Hard I Nearly Wrecked My Eyes" – 3:27
11. "I Am the Monument" – 4:59

== Personnel ==
- Engineer/Producer – Andy Gerber (tracks 1, 2, 5 to 11)
- Producer − Johnny K
- Vocals, Lyrics, Guitar − Blake Smith
- Guitar − Dave Suh
- Bass Guitar − Mike Willison
- Drums − Jason Batchko
- Performer – Los Bucaneros
- Main Performer – Caviar
- Photography – James Smolka
- Performer – Jo Stafford
- Keyboards – John San Juan (on track 10)
- Backing vocals - Tamar Berk (on track 3)
- Mixing Assistant – Mark Niemec
- Mixing Assistant – Mark Ralston
- Mixing – Paul David Hager
- Assistant – Tadpole
- Mastering – Ted Jensen
- Performer – The Left Blanke
