= L/D =

L/D may refer to:

- Learning and development, in human resource management
- Lift-to-drag ratio, in aerodynamics
- Lincoln–Douglas debates, a series of seven debates in 1858 between Abraham Lincoln, the Republican candidate for the Senate in Illinois, and Senator Stephen Douglas, the Democratic Party candidate

== See also ==
- DL (disambiguation)
- LD (disambiguation)
