= Hiding in Hip Hop =

2008 non-fiction book

- Author: Terrance Dean
- Language: English
- Genre: Memoir
- Published: 2008
- Publisher: Atria Books
- Publication place: United States
- Pages: 305
- ISBN: 978-1416553397
- Dewey Decimal: 306.76/5092
- LC Class: HQ74.2.U5 D43 2008

Hiding in Hip Hop: On the Down Low in the Entertainment Industry—from Music to Hollywood is a 2008 memoir by the former MTV executive Terrance Dean.

== Summary ==
Hiding in Hip Hop begins with an account of Dean's traumatic childhood growing up impoverished to abusive, drug addicted parents and how these childhood experiences led him to the entertainment industry.

Dean then discusses how he got involved in a secret gay hip-hop subculture and his first parties. He gives graphic depictions of sexual acts between men he either participated in or witnessed, some allegedly involving well-known rappers or Hollywood celebrities. Throughout the book, Dean refers to himself and various individuals as being "down-low" or "down-low gay": men who have sex with men but do not consider themselves gay or are in the closet.

Dean discusses the "macho", "gangster" image that is the corner-stone but does not define the hip-hop industry, and how it plays against the "sissy" "weak" image of the gay community. Dean states that by outing himself and coming to terms with his sexuality, he might help other individuals or improve hip-hop and Hollywood as a whole.

== Publication ==
In 2007 the publishing company Simon & Schuster announced the upcoming release of a book by Terrance Dean that would out gay men in the entertainment industry. In 2008 Hiding in Hip Hop was published by Atria, a subsidiary of Simon & Schuster. Contrary to its marketing, the book does not name real-life hip-hop artists, but rather contains blind items: allegedly gay rappers are assigned pseudonyms.

== Reception ==
The Movie Nation critic Wesley Morris described the book's prose as "E. Lynn Harris sending Terry McMillan a one-handed email from his BlackBerry". He stated that the blind items were unremarkable: "it doesn't sound like there's anything all that scandalous here. From a pop-culture standpoint, this all seems moot." Black entertainment magazine Essence listed Hiding in Hip Hop as a best-selling non-fiction book in November 2008, based upon sales from African-American bookstores throughout the United States.

== See also ==
- LGBTQ representation in hip-hop
