= Terrance Dean =

American author and academic (1968–2022)

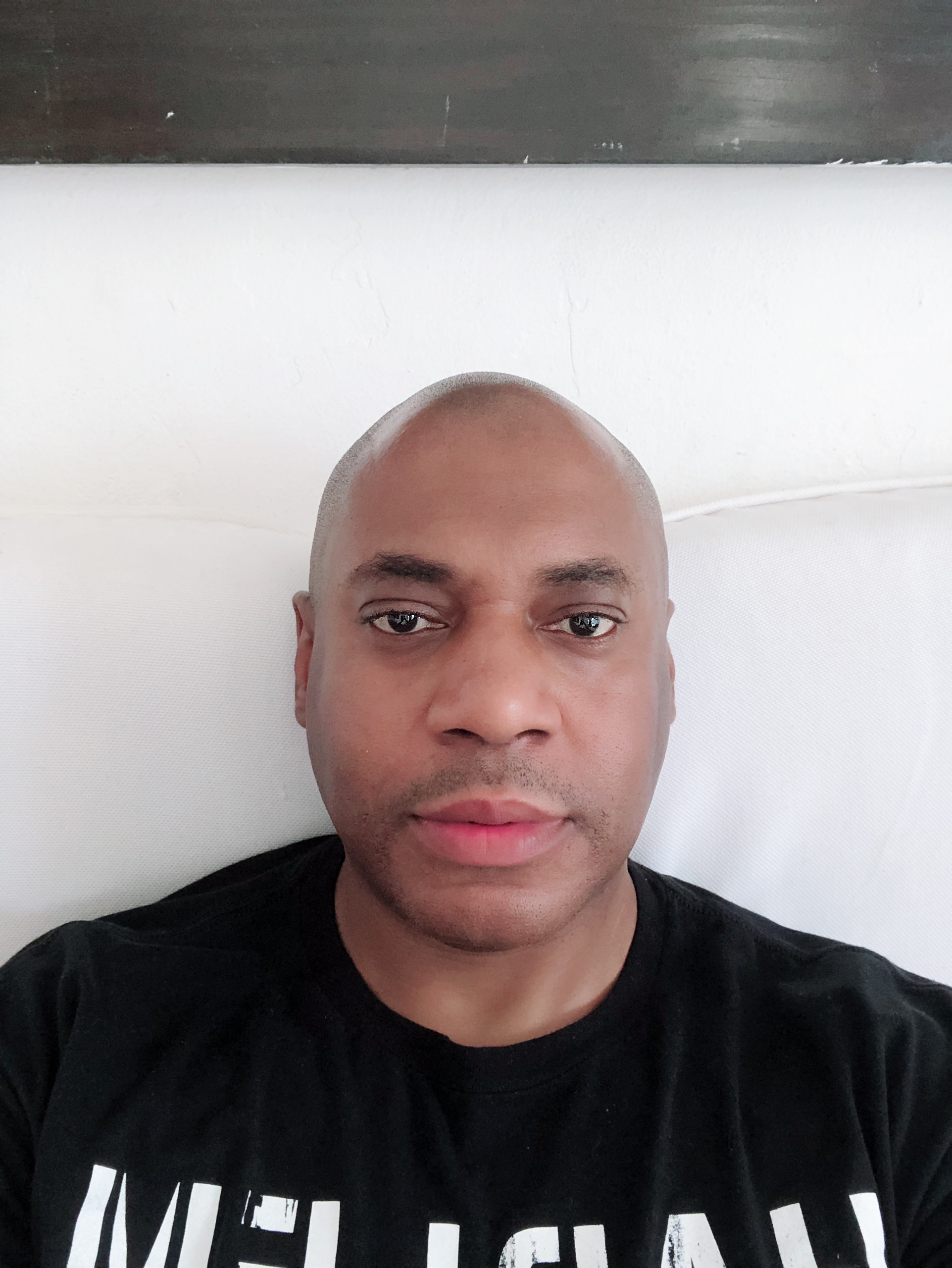
- Born: September 8, 1968; Detroit, Michigan, U.S.
- Died: August 11, 2022 (aged 53); Columbus, Ohio, U.S.
- Occupations: Author and professor
- Years active: 2008–2022
- Notable work: Hiding in Hip-Hop

Terrance Dean (September 8, 1968 - August 11, 2022) was an author, academic, and a former MTV executive. He is best known for his 2008 memoir Hiding in Hip-Hop and is the author of books including Reclaim Your Power! A 30-Day Guide to Hope, Healing and Inspiration for Men of Color (2003), Straight From Your Gay Best Friend – The Straight Up Truth About Relationships, Love, and Having A Fabulous Life (2010), Visible Lives: Three Stories in Tribute to E. Lynn Harris, (2010). In 2011, Dean made his fiction debut with his novel, MOGUL. Dean was a postdoctoral fellow in Black Studies at Denison University since 2019 .

== Career ==
Dean was a contributing writer to several anthologies including Souls of My Brothers and Always Too Soon. He wrote for VIBE, ESSENCE, XXL, Juicy Magazine, Huffington Post, The Advocate, The New York Sun, and The Tennessean.

Dean was featured in Newsweek, Ms. Magazine, Time Magazine, New York Magazine, The Observer UK, Genre, Hip Hop Weekly, and Mediatakeout.com.

Dean worked with television and film production companies such as B.E.T., Savoy Television, Paramount Pictures, Warner Bros, and Sony Pictures. He worked with MTV Networks for several years aiding in the production of live award shows and events.

Dean received his PhD in religion from Vanderbilt University, where he studied the relationships between race, sexuality, sex and, gender in homiletics and liturgics. He previously received his BA in communications from Fisk University; Master of Theological Studies from Vanderbilt, and MA in religion from Vanderbilt. As assistant professor of Black Studies at Denison University, his research concerned topics including African-American religion, the African-American diaspora, Afro-futurism and the work of James Baldwin. He was appointed the first Aminah Brenda Lynn Robinson Scholar-in-Residence at the Columbus Museum of Art in January 2022.

== Death ==
According to officials at Denison University, where Dean was employed, sometime in the summer of 2022, Dean was stricken with illness and briefly spent time in a hospital in Columbus, Ohio. On, August 11, 2022, Columbus police performed a wellness check in which they found Dean dead in his home. An exact cause of death was not provided.

== Bibliography ==
- Reclaim Your Power! A 30-Day Guide to Hope, Healing and Inspiration for Men of Color (2003)
- Hiding in Hip-Hop (2008)
- Straight From Your Gay Best Friend – The Straight Up Truth About Relationships, Love, and Having A Fabulous Life (2010)
- Visible Lives: Three Stories in Tribute to E. Lynn Harris (2010)
- MOGUL (2011)

== Influences ==
Dean cited the late Afro-American and openly gay author E. Lynn Harris as a literary influence.
