= On the Down Low =

2004 book by J. L. King

On the Down Low: A Journey Into the Lives of Straight Black Men Who Sleep with Men
- Cover of the first edition
- Author: J. L. King
- Language: English
- Publisher: Broadway Books
- Publication date: April 14, 2004
- Publication place: United States
- Media type: Print (Hardback & Paperback)
- Pages: 208 pages
- ISBN: 0767913981

On the Down Low: A Journey Into the Lives of Straight Black Men Who Sleep with Men is a 2004 New York Times Bestselling non-fiction book by J. L. King. The book was released in hardback on April 14, 2004, through Broadway Books and details the sexual lives of African-American men who are on the "down low" or having sex with men while posing or identifying as heterosexual. When the book was initially released, King denied claims that he was gay in both the book and in the media, but later confirmed that he was gay in 2010.

== Synopsis ==
In the book King discusses the subject of African-American men who claim to be or otherwise consider themselves to be heterosexual, but hold secret sexual encounters with other men. The men give an outward appearance of only being heterosexual and will hold long-term relationships with women without informing the women or anyone else that they are having encounters, some of which are unprotected, with other men. King also discusses his own personal experience with living on the "down low", as well as what he perceives as potential risks and dangers that some forms of the lifestyle can bring.

== Reception ==
Critical reception for On the Down Low was mostly positive, with Booklist calling the book "a revealing look at an important social and health issue". Robert Burns, director of Brother to Brother, criticized the book, stating that it "perpetuates stereotypes" and that the down low culture was "more complex" and "doesn't just exist the way (King) explained it".

== On the Up and Up ==
In 2005 King's ex-wife Brenda Stone Browder published On the Up and Up, a non-fiction book that was described as both a "survival guide" and a biography of Browder's life before and after discovering King's activities.

== See also ==
- Beyond the Down Low

General:

- African-American culture and sexual orientation
