= The Thin Mercury Sound =

Studio album by Caviar
- Released: July 27, 2004
- Genre: Pop rock
- Label: Aezra Records

Caviar chronology
Caviar (2000)	The Thin Mercury Sound (2004)

The Thin Mercury Sound is the second album by Caviar. It was released July 27, 2004. Vocalist/guitarist Blake Smith claimed the album would be reminiscent of bands such as Joy Division, New Order, and the Cure. The title is taken from a quote by Bob Dylan talking about his album Blonde on Blonde (1966).

== Track listing ==
1. "Aloha" – 3:23
2. "Clean Getaway" – 4:18
3. "Lioness" – 3:42
4. "Hey Let Go" – 4:24
5. "You've Got a Black Black Heart" – 4:18
6. "On the DL" – 3:49
7. "Last of the Gold" – 4:32
8. "Tiny Cannibal Bites" – 3:08
9. "666" – 3:46
10. "Deep Down I'm Shallow" – 3:48
11. "Where Are You" – 3:40
12. "Light Up the Sky" – 3:29
13. "10% November" – 4:02
14. "Ego Trippin'" – 3:25
15. "Last Rays of the Sun" – 4:20

== Credits ==
- Logo, logo design – Brock Manke
- Main performer – Caviar
- Art direction, photography – Chris Strong
- Guest appearance – Christiaan Webb
- Mastering – Howie Weinberg
- Drums – Jason Batchko
- Assistant, assistant engineer – Luke Tierney
- Assistant, assistant engineer – Mark Ralston
- Bass Guitar, Keyboards, mixing, producer – Mike Willison
- Vocals, Lyrics, Guitar, producer – Blake Smith
- Engineer, guest appearance – Neal Ostrovsky
- Engineer, guest appearance – Paul David Hager
- Engineer – Rob Ruccia
- Assistant, assistant engineer – Scott Guitierrez
- Guitar – Dave Suh
- Guest Artist – Scott Lucas
- Guest Artist – Tamar Berk
