= Caviar (band) =

American rock band

- Origin: Chicago, Illinois, United States
- Genres: Power pop, alternative rock, indie rock
- Years active: 1999–2004
- Labels: Island Records, Aezra Records
- Spinoff of: Fig Dish
- Past members: Blake Smith; Mike Willison; Dave Suh; Jason Batchko
- Website: www.myspace.com/caviar

Caviar was an American alternative rock/power pop band from Chicago, Illinois. The band was created around 1999 by vocalist/guitarist Blake Smith and bassist Mike Willison after the breakup of their previous band Fig Dish, due to getting dropped by their label, A&M Records. After visiting England, Smith and Willison took an interest in electronica's rise in popularity, deciding to implement this to their more guitar-driven sound. Originally, this new band was called Cartoon Boyfriend. Lead guitarist Dave Suh and drummer Bill Swartz, the latter having played on Fig Dish's previous album, were then brought in. New drummer Jason Batchko was then added to the official lineup after the band got signed, and Swartz had departed. As opposed to Fig Dish, where lyric-writing duties were shared among guitarist/vocalist Rick Ness, Smith and Willison, all of Caviar's lyrics came from Smith. Caviar released their debut self titled album in 2000, under major label Island Records, receiving modest success. They would release their second album, The Thin Mercury Sound in 2004, under smaller label Aezra, which was a subsidiary of EMI Records. Although recording guitars for the album, Suh would leave the band prior to its release, and was replaced by Peter Muschong of The Tossers for subsequent shows.

Smith and Willison later performed with Scott Lucas of Local H in the electronica project The Prairie Cartel. Smith later fronted Chicago noise pop band Forgotten Species. Willison would do a Portland-based solo project called Merit Badge, and has also been in the winery industry. Suh would be the lead vocalist and guitarist of alternative band The Assembly, along with his multi-instrumentalist brother, Nathan Suh. During his time in Caviar, Suh would also play lead guitar in the power-pop garage band Woolworthy, with whom he reunited in 2023.

Caviar has had several songs played on the radio. The songs "Tangerine Speedo" and "On the DL" were their biggest hits. "Tangerine Speedo" was featured in the first Charlie's Angels movie and "Sugarless" was featured on the soundtrack of Gone in 60 Seconds. Safeway has featured in its TV commercials two songs from Thin Mercury Sound, including "Clean Getaway" in the summer of 2005 and "Lioness" in 2004. "Tangerine Speedo" was also featured in the ending of the 2003 film The Cat in the Hat, a movie adaptation of the Dr. Seuss book of the same name, as an instrumental. The track samples "El Bossa Nova" by Los Bucaneros. A snippet of their song "The Good Times Are Over" was used in the 2008 English dub of Dragon Ball Z: Bardock – The Father of Goku. Their song "I Thought I was Found" was also featured in the 4th season of Buffy the Vampire Slayer.

== Discography ==
=== Albums ===
- Caviar (2000)
- Thin Mercury Sound (2004)

=== Singles ===
- "Tangerine Speedo" (2000 #28 Billboard Hot Modern Rock Tracks)
