= Keith Boykin =

American author, producer, and political commentator (born 1965)

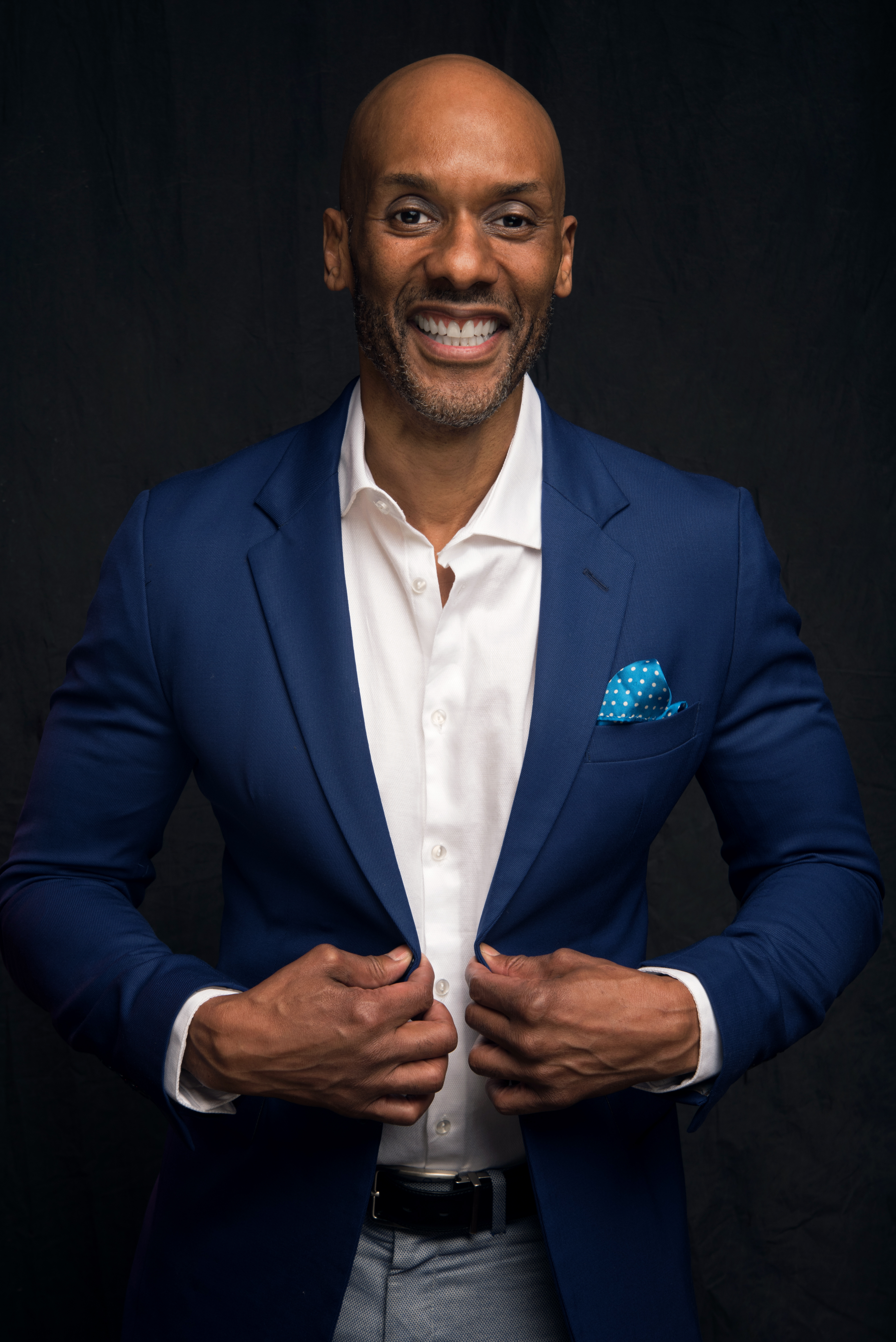
- Born: August 28, 1965 (age 60); St. Louis, Missouri, U.S.
- Education: Dartmouth College (BA); Harvard Law School (JD)
- Occupations: Author; political commentator; television producer
- Website: keithboykin.com

Keith Boykin (born August 28, 1965) is an American author, political commentator, and television producer. A former aide to President Bill Clinton, he served in the Clinton White House as a special assistant from 1993 to 1995. He is the author of several books on race and sexuality, including the New York Times bestseller Beyond the Down Low, and has worked as a political commentator for CNBC and CNN. A longtime LGBTQ rights activist, he co-founded the National Black Justice Coalition.

== Early life ==
Boykin was born on August 28, 1965, in St. Louis, Missouri. He grew up mainly in the mostly white suburb of Florissant, where he developed an early interest in government and leadership and took part in student government and several sports, including track and field and wrestling.

At the age of fifteen, Boykin moved to Florida to live with his father, William O. Boykin, who had relocated to start a beauty supply business. He attended Countryside High School in Clearwater, Florida, where he became president of the student government, edited the school newspaper, debated, and competed in varsity track and field.

Boykin enrolled at Dartmouth College in 1983. In 1984 he received the William S. Churchill Prize for an outstanding freshman, and in 1987 he won the Barrett Cup as the most distinguished member of the graduating class. At Dartmouth he served as editor-in-chief of the student newspaper, ran on the track team, and studied abroad in Spain; he graduated in 1987 with a Bachelor of Arts in government.

After Dartmouth, Boykin worked on Michael Dukakis's presidential campaign from June 1987 to November 1988. He began studies at Harvard Law School in 1989, where he edited the Harvard Civil Rights–Civil Liberties Law Review. He also took part in the Coalition for Civil Rights, a student group that pressed the law school to diversify its faculty, and joined ten other students in a racial discrimination lawsuit against the school.

== Career ==
After graduating from Harvard in 1992, Boykin briefly worked at a San Francisco law firm where he had previously interned, before leaving to join Bill Clinton's presidential campaign as Midwest press director.

Following Clinton's victory in 1992, Boykin joined the Clinton White House as a special assistant to the president, serving as director of news analysis and later as director of specialty media. In April 1993, he helped arrange the first meeting between a sitting U.S. president and representatives of the LGBTQ community. The meeting included eight people from three organizations: the National Gay and Lesbian Task Force, the Black Gay and Lesbian Leadership Forum, and the March on Washington Committee.

Boykin left the White House in January 1995 to write his first book, One More River to Cross: Black and Gay in America, which examined the particular challenges faced by Black LGBTQ people. He later wrote Beyond the Down Low: Sex, Lies, and Denial in Black America, a New York Times bestseller.

In late 1995, Boykin became executive director of the National Black Gay and Lesbian Leadership Forum. In Quitting, he recalls that during his tenure the organization mounted a contingent in the Million Man March, held three national conferences, opened an office in Washington, D.C., hired a small staff, and hosted community events. He spoke at the Millennium March on Washington for LGBTQ rights in 2000.

From 1999 to 2001, Boykin taught political science as an adjunct professor at American University in Washington, D.C. In 2001 he moved to New York City, where he co-founded the National Black Justice Coalition in 2003; the organization describes its mission as ending racism, homophobia, and bias against LGBTQ and same-gender-loving people.

In 2004, Boykin and his partner at the time, Nathan Hale Williams, appeared on the Showtime reality series American Candidate; they were described as the first openly Black gay couple to appear on a reality television program.

In 2005, Minister Louis Farrakhan invited Boykin to speak at the tenth-anniversary commemoration of the Million Man March, but the invitation was withdrawn shortly before the event after one of its organizers, the Reverend Willie F. Wilson, objected to his participation.

In February 2006, Boykin became co-host of the current-affairs program My Two Cents on BET J, which examined topical issues for Black audiences. He also worked as an associate producer on the 2006 film Dirty Laundry.

Boykin served as a contributor to CNBC from 2008 to 2016 and to CNN from January 2017 to January 2022. He has also appeared on VH1, BET, MSNBC, Fox News, and NPR, and on programs including The Montel Williams Show, The Tom Joyner Morning Show, Tony Brown's Journal, and Anderson Cooper 360. He was named one of Out magazine's "Out 100" in 2004 and has been featured or quoted in The New York Times, The Washington Post, USA Today, Vibe, and Jet.

As a writer, Boykin has contributed to outlets including The New York Times, The Washington Post, The Village Voice, the San Francisco Chronicle, the St. Petersburg Times, The Advocate, Black Issues Book Review, and The Crisis. His syndicated column appeared in newspapers including The New York Blade, the Washington Blade, Southern Voice, and the Houston Voice.

== Personal life ==
Boykin has described several of his forebears in interviews and on social media. His great-great-grandfather, the Rev. John H. Dickerson, an A.M.E. pastor, served as grand master of the Prince Hall Affiliated Masons of Florida from 1899 to 1916 and chaired the 1912 Florida state Republican convention. His great-grandfather, Horatio Dickerson, served in the 369th Infantry Regiment (the "Harlem Hellfighters") from 1917 to 1919, and his grandfather, John H. Dickerson Sr., was principal of Campbell Street Elementary School in Daytona Beach, Florida.

Boykin publicly came out as gay in his 1996 book One More River to Cross: Black & Gay in America. In 2006, he won a gold medal in wrestling at the 2006 Gay Games in Chicago. He first met his biological father, John Dickerson, a chemist, in 2015.

In 2022, Boykin moved to Los Angeles while keeping a residence in New York City. He has two godsons whom he considers his sons.

== Published works ==
- One More River to Cross: Black & Gay in America. Anchor Books. 1996. ISBN 978-0385479837.
- Respecting the Soul: Daily Reflections for Black Lesbians and Gays. Avon Books. 1999. ISBN 0380800217.
- Beyond the Down Low: Sex, Lies, and Denial in Black America. Carroll & Graf. 2004. ISBN 0786714344.
- For Colored Boys Who Have Considered Suicide When the Rainbow Is Still Not Enough (editor). Magnus Books. 2012. ISBN 1936833158.
- Race Against Time: The Politics of a Darkening America. Bold Type Books. 2021. ISBN 978-1645037262.
- Quitting: Why I Left My Job to Live a Life of Freedom. Scribd Originals. 2022. ISBN 978-1094451107.
- Why Does Everything Have to Be About Race?. Bold Type Books. 2024. ISBN 978-1541703315.
