= No homo =

Slang

"No homo" is a slang phrase used at the end of a sentence to assert the statement or action by the speaker had no intentional homosexual implications, to "rid [oneself] of a possible homosexual double-entendre".

== History ==
The phrase was originated by Harlem, New York City, natives as a way to quash any sexual and gender error or overstep within lyrics. Joshua Brown in the Journal of Homosexuality, states "the phrase 'no homo' arose in Hip-Hop lyrics of the 1990s as a discourse interjection to negate supposed sexual and gender transgressions". The phrase "no homo" used in a lyrical context comes as a pre-emptive maneuver to deflect any attacks on the artist's masculinity or heterosexual status. Within this context, "'No homo' is not necessarily addressing homosexuality, but creating a verbal defensive in the musical battlefield that is wrought with signifyn' and bustin'. [Musicians] realize that a lyric, which is 'inadvertently gay,' is fodder for another's verbal attack on their masculinity within hip-hop culture. In an attempt to divert their own de-masculinization, musicians presuppose those attacks at their masculinity".

== Use of the phrase ==
As with many attributes of hip hop culture, the use of "no homo" has become integrated into the mainstream North American vernacular. One reason for this as proposed by Brown is that the integration and reception of the specific phrase no homo into the conversational dialect of North American English was simple and due in part to its phonetic resonance. Due to its association to the display of hypermasculinity, scholar Deborah Cameron argues the use of this phrase by young males demonstrates how "gender has constantly to be reaffirmed and publicly displayed by repeatedly performing particular acts in accordance to cultural norms".

A 2018 analysis of 396 tweets containing "no homo" found that while the phrase was sometimes used as an insult against those expressing non-heteronormative behavior, it was more commonly used in tweets about liking something or same-sex friendships, where "no homo" defends against accusations of effeminacy or homosexuality.

The use of "no homo" among women is far less commonplace. Brown states that "women can and do use 'no homo,' although the instances are markedly less in frequency" because it is not unacceptable for a female to commit a gender transgression or display femininity through their modes of speaking. Hip hop artist Nicki Minaj used the phrase in her song "Baddest Bitch", stating in the lyrics: "And if he want some pussy that's a no-no / I only fuck with bad bitches, no homo".

There are instances of LGBT people using "no homo," though it is most often done so in a more ambiguous or critical light and does not reduce the homophobic qualities. For instance, it could be used by a gay man "when complimenting a straight man on his appearance...distancing the compliment from a sexual advance, when a gay man feels threatened or seeks to protect himself from misunderstanding". In these instances, the phrase was used either as a protective measure for one's legitimate misunderstanding or as an ironic commentary on the phrase itself.

== Criticism of the phrase ==
Several social commentators have criticized the use of "no homo" in hip hop and in the mainstream. It has been said that the phrase "uphold[s] an unhealthy relationship with homosexuality, a relationship based in fear." Fox News commentator Marc Lamont Hill encouraged the hip hop community to stop using "no homo" in its music.

Slate columnist Jonah Weiner notes several hip hop artists – such as Cam'ron and Lil Wayne – cultivate an extravagant and camp public persona while embracing homophobia, but saying "no homo" can help expand established concepts of masculinity and challenge the status quo.

== Notable uses ==
- In 2008, hip hop artists Nicki Minaj and Lil Wayne used the term "no homo" in their songs "Baddest Bitch" on her Sucka Free mixtape and "Lollipop" on his album Tha Carter III respectively.
- In 2011, the Lonely Island made a parody of the expression with their song "No Homo" published in their album Turtleneck & Chain. The song begins with standard usage of the term and expands to be said after more and more blatantly homosexual statements such as "I've been thinking about fucking a dude (no homo)".
- In 2013, Roy Hibbert of the Indiana Pacers stirred up controversy after he used the term in a post-game interview following a playoff game against the Miami Heat. Hibbert was fined US$75,000 by the NBA for his comments. Hibbert said, "The momentum could have shifted right there if [James] got an easy dunk." "There was what – was it Game 3 here? I really felt that I let Paul down in terms of having his back when LeBron was scoring in the post or getting to the paint, because he stretched me out so much. No homo." Hibbert later apologized for the remark and another obscenity he used during the press conference in a statement released by the Pacers: "I am apologizing for insensitive remarks made during the postgame press conference after our victory over Miami Saturday night," Hibbert said in the statement released by the Pacers. "They were disrespectful and offensive and not a reflection of my personal views. I used a slang term that is not appropriate in any setting, private or public, and the language I used definitely has no place in a public forum, especially over live television. I apologize to those who I have offended, to our fans and to the Pacers' organization."
- In 2018, Denver Nuggets center Nikola Jokić was fined $25,000 for using the phrase in a post-game interview.
- In 2023, basketball player Cam Thomas used the phrase in a post-game interview. He was fined $40,000 by the NBA for using “derogatory and disparaging language”.
- In 2024, NBA player LaMelo Ball was fined $100,000 by the NBA after he used the phrase in a post-game interview. After issuing the fine, the NBA released a statement which described Ball's language as “offensive and derogatory”.

== See also ==
- African-American culture and sexual orientation
- Down-low (sexual slang)
- LGBT representations in hip hop music
- Not Gay
