= One More River to Cross (book) =

1996 book written by Keith Boykin

One More River to Cross: Black and Gay in America
- Author: Keith Boykin
- Language: English
- Genre: Biography
- Published: 1996
- Publisher: Anchor Books
- Publication place: United States
- Pages: 272
- ISBN: 9780385479820
- OCLC: 1068335546

One More River to Cross: Black and Gay in America is a 1996 book written by Keith Boykin, who ran a now-defunct national black gay and lesbian organization. He begins the book by describing his life, including coming out at Harvard Law School, working for President Bill Clinton, and his first sexual experience. He interviews many famous African-American gay men and lesbians such as Cleo Manago, Perry Watkins, and Cheryl Clarke.

He describes the homophobia of celebrated blacks such as Muhammad Ali and Colin Powell. He also details insensitive actions from white gays such as Robert Mapplethorpe and Frank Kameny. Boykin attempts to spell out how racism and homophobia intersect but also diverge in the lives of African-American gay men and lesbians.

== See also ==
- African-American culture and sexual orientation
