= J. L. King =

American writer

- Born: James Louis King; United States
- Occupations: Author, publisher, writer
- Writing career
- Language: English
- Genres: Non-fiction, fiction
- Notable work: On the Down Low

J.L. King is a New York Times best selling author, publisher, and HIV/STD activist. Subjects of his work include the nature of human behavior, effects of health issues on minorities, and sexual orientation and its impact on schools. King's first book, On the Down Low: A Journey Into the Lives of Straight Black Men Who Sleep with Men appeared on The New York Times Best Seller list for more than 30 consecutive weeks.

King was the owner of the book publishing companies Urban Moon Publishing and J. L. King Publishing.

King has appeared in several national publications, including Newsweek, Salon, The Washington Post, and the Chicago Tribune.

He has appeared as a special guest on many television shows, including The Oprah Winfrey Show, Inside Edition and CNN.

King has been listed in Ebony magazine's 50 most Intriguing Blacks and honored as an NAACP Image Award Nominee for Outstanding Literary Work.

In 2006, King produced The DL Exposed, a documentary that was broadcast on Black Entertainment Television.

== Bibliography ==
=== Books ===
- Love on a Two-Way Street
- Sexual Orientation and its Impact on Schools: A Guide for Middle and Secondary Educators
- CP Time: Why Some People Are Always Late
- Dear JL... Real Stories from Real people: Relationships, Sexuality, HIV, Youth and Religion, Volume 1
- Staying Power
- Coming Up from the Down Low: The Journey to Acceptance Healing and Honest Love
- On the Down Low: A Journey into the Lives of Straight Black Men Who Sleep With Men

=== DVD Releases ===
- Top 10 Signs of Down Low Behavior and More...
- How to Become a Successful and Selling Author
- No More Secrets, No More Lies... Saving Our Daughters
