= Trinity Ordona =

Filipino-American teacher and activist

Trinity Ordoña
- Ordoña at the 2017 Queer and Asian Conference (QACON) at UC Berkeley
- Born: San Diego, California
- Occupations: Academic, Grassroots organizer, Reverend
- Spouse: Desirée Thompson
- Awards: Northern California GLBT Historical Society Award for Individual Historic Achievement 2008 Phoenix Award Honorees from Asian Pacific Islander Queer Women and Transgender Community

Academic background
- Education: University of California, Santa Cruz

Academic work
- Discipline: American Studies, LGBT Studies, Liberal Arts, Community Studies and Politics, History of Asian Americans
- Sub-discipline: Queer and Transgender Asian and Pacific Islander Ethnohistory
- Institutions: City College of San Francisco
- Main interests: Queer women of color health, Social stratification
- Notable works: Coming Out Together: An Ethnohistory of the Asian and Pacific Islander Queer Women's and Transgendered People's Movement of San Francisco

Rev. Trinity Ordoña is a lesbian Filipino-American college teacher, activist, community organizer, and ordained minister currently residing in the San Francisco Bay Area. She is notable for her grassroots work on intersectional social justice. Her activism includes issues of voice and visibility for Asian/Pacific gay, lesbian, bisexual, transgender and queer individuals and their families, Lesbians of color, and survivors of sexual abuse. Her works include her dissertation Coming Out Together: an ethnohistory of the Asian and Pacific Islander queer women's and transgendered people's movement of San Francisco, as well as various interviews and articles published in anthologies like Filipino Americans: Transformation and Identity and Asian/Pacific Islander American Women: A Historical Anthology. She co-founded Asian and Pacific Islander Family Pride (APIFP), which "[sustains] support networks for API families with members who are LGBTQ," founded Healing for Change, "a CCSF student organization that sponsors campus-community healing events directed to survivors of violence and abuse," and is currently an instructor in the Lesbian, Gay, Bisexual and Transgender Studies Department at City College of San Francisco.

== Biography ==
Ordoña was born in San Diego, California to Filipino immigrants, where she lived until she was eighteen years old. She attended Immaculate Heart College until 1971, where she majored in liberal arts. From there she attended University of California, Santa Cruz and University of California, Berkeley where she received a Bachelor of Arts in Asian American History. Ordoña went on to receive a Ph.D. in History of Consciousness from University of California, Santa Cruz.

Ordoña met Desirée Thompson in Hawaii in July 1985. Thompson moved to San Francisco in 1987, when she and Ordoña began their relationship. On June 25, 1988, Ordoña and Thompson married in Golden Gate Park. 120 people attended the marriage ceremony. They drove down Castro Street on the back of a convertible, and on the next day drove the same convertible in the Gay Pride Parade.

== Works ==
Topics of interest in Ordoña's published works cover the politics of racial triangulation within feminist social justice spaces, internalized racism and the idea that shared oppression is not sufficient grounds for solidarity (similar to June Jordan's ideas in "Report from the Bahamas"), identities of alterity, social inequalities and its relationship to privilege. Her works have been published in anthologies edited by Gloria Anzaldúa, Sharon Lim-Hing, and Maria P. P. Root. She has also been published in the Amerasia Journal, in roundtable discussion with other queer women academics about immigration topics, perceived homophobia in Asian American communities, and the Ameri-centric model of coming out.

In grassroots movements, Ordoña has organized in activism around San Francisco's I-Hotel, the Agbayani Village for Retired Farmworkers Union, and anti-Vietnam War efforts. She is a founding member of the Red Envelope Giving Circle in the San Francisco Bay Area, a group that has "granted over $42,500 to 22 individual and group projects." There is a collection of Ordoña's papers in the Ethnic Studies Library of the University of California, Berkeley.

== Awards and achievements ==
- APIQWTC's Phoenix Award 2008 with partner Desiree Thompson
- UCSF Chancellor's Award for Public Service (1999)
  - Noted for her activism on the International Hotel, United Farm Workers, Fight Back Campaign against the KKK
- Northern California GLBT Historical Society Award for Individual Historic Achievement
- BACW Lesbian of Achievement, Vision and Action Award
- Co-host of Bay Area Lesbian Health Conference (2002)
- Presenter in Mumbai conference of international gay and lesbian organizations (2002)
- Co-founder of APIFP, previously the San Francisco chapter of PFLAG
- Associate Director of the UCSF Lesbian Health Research Center (2002–04)
- "20 Most Influential Lesbian Professors" (2008) by Curve

== See also ==
- Intersectionality
- List of Filipino Americans
- Racism in the LGBT community
- Homophobia in ethnic minority communities
