= Racism in the LGBTQ community =

Racism is a concern for many in the Western lesbian, gay, bisexual and transgender (LGBTQ) communities, with members of racial, ethnic, and national minorities reporting having faced discrimination from other LGBT people.

In the United States, ethnic minority LGBT individuals may find themselves in a double minority, in which they are neither entirely accepted nor understood by mainly white LGBT communities, nor are they fully accepted by their own ethnic group. Many people experience racism in the dominant LGBT community in which racial stereotypes merge with gender stereotypes; for example, Asian-American LGBT people are often stereotyped by Westerners as more passive and feminine, while African-American LGBT people are stereotyped as more aggressive. A number of culturally specific support networks for LGBT people are active in the United States, such as "Ô-Môi", a support network for Vietnamese-American queer females.

== Anti-Arab sentiment ==
A report titled We're Family Too studied what it calls same-sex-attracted people from Arab backgrounds in Australia. The respondents were from both Christian and Muslim religious backgrounds. Many people in the Arab community spoke about ethnic stereotypes.

Some Mizrahi Jews and Arab Jews report exclusion and discrimination by the Ashkenazi LGBT community in Israel. Some LGBT Mizrahi Jews have alleged that aspects of Ashkenazi LGBT activism express "Ashkenazi hegemony" and leave "no legitimized cultural space for Mizrahi queers to express their Arab culture and heritage".

== Anti-Asian and anti-Pacific Islander sentiment ==
In a study by the National Gay and Lesbian Task Force on LGBT Asian Americans and Pacific Islander Americans, 82% of the surveyed participants reported experiencing racism from white members of the LGBT community. Another challenge that many Asian Pacific Americans who are LGBTQ must face is racism, in society at large and within the LGBT community. Sometimes, this is from overt discrimination; other times, it is the lack of Asian Pacific Islander representation.

British Asian gay men living in Yorkshire and elsewhere in northern England have reported increasing levels of racism and discrimination from white gay men. LGBT communities in ethnically diverse areas of the UK, such as Manchester and London, were found by the Naz Project to be more tolerant.

Asian American men are often represented in media, both mainstream and LGBT, as being feminized and desexualized. LGBT Asian men often report "sexual racism" from white LGBT men. The gay Asian-Canadian author Richard Fung has written that while black men are portrayed as hypersexualized, gay Asian men are portrayed as being undersexed. Fung also wrote about feminizing depictions of Asian men in gay pornography, which often focuses on gay Asian men's submission to the pleasure of white men. According to Fung, gay Asian men tend to ignore or display displeasure with other races but seemingly give sexual acceptance and approval to gay white men. Building off the work of Fung, Gilbert Caluya argues that media creates a "symbolic castration" among them. He also notes in his research, which interviewed gay men of Southeast Asian descent, that they were more likely to face covert racism from men of Anglo descent. In interracial gay male pornography, Asian men are usually portrayed as submissive "bottoms." The gay Asian male's penis is hidden and the focus tends to be on the curves of the body, which is a filming technique traditionally used for women. Racist stereotypes about gay Asian men, which include images of all gay Asian men as effeminate, having small penises, and as passive partners in terms of anal sex (bottoms), contribute to the anti-Asian sentiment within the gay male community.

Gay Asian men frequently experience racism on gay dating websites, where it is common for profiles to state a sexual preference for men of certain races, using phrases such as "No Asians", or "No fats, no femmes, no Asians". Some Asian gay men report being "relegated to the bottom of the attractiveness spectrum" due to "racial lookism", a combination of racism and lookism. White gay men are more likely than other racial groups to indicate "No Asians" when seeking partners. In many English-speaking countries, there is a strict racial hierarchy where white men are at the top and Asian men are somewhere far beneath. Senthorum Raj argues that "whiteness...becomes a privileged form desiring capital, enabling bodies that 'pass' as 'White', while marking out bodies which do not. Racial 'others' become produced in this economy of desire as fetishes or repugnant objects," and that Whiteness becomes the standard by which desirability is measured.

In a descriptive study conducted by Damien Riggs in Australia, he pulled samples of profiles from a gay dating site and analyzed the profiles for anti-Asian sentiment. His findings showed that anti-Asian sentiment takes on four different forms: "1. The construction of racism as 'personal preference'; 2. The construction of Asian gay men as not 'real men'; 3. The construction of Asian gay men as a 'type'; and 4. The assumption that saying 'sorry' renders anti-Asian sentiment somehow acceptable." Riggs explains that it is problematic to conflate racialized desire with personal preference, as "it constructs 'preference' and identity categories as equitable, which ignores the fact that gay Asian men do not choose their Asian identity." This also reduces gay Asian men to the category of an object or "kink" that can be adopted or cast aside at will.

An example of Riggs' third form of anti-Asian sentiment can take the form of the fetishization of gay Asian men and, thus, their objectification. White gay men who fetishize gay Asian men are given the label "rice queen." "Rice queens" view gay Asian men as the only possible objects of erotic interest and reduce gay Asian men to a category of an object.

Asian women are stereotyped as "passive but exotic," and lesbian Asian women report being stereotyped as "exotic" or viewed as not lesbian due to being Asian. "Yellow fever" is also cited as a concern among some Asian-American lesbians, along with sexual objectification. Lesbian Asian-Americans also face conflict in the intersectionality of their identities as lesbians and Asian-Americans. Asian women, particularly femme women, are perceived as "easy target[s]" for harassment by men due to their stereotype as feminine, docile, submissive, passive, and weak. Similarly, stereotypes of an Asian woman's appearance, typically femme, in contrast with a stereotypical lesbian's appearance—typically butch—exclude femme lesbian and bisexual Asian women.

=== Gay Asian American men in media ===
Gay Asian American men have a stereotype of being feminine, as depicted in media such as the Grey's Anatomy episode "Where the Boys Are", which depicts an Asian American man as merely the spouse rather than his White partner, who is a soldier. Chong-Suk Han, one of the leading researchers of queer Asian Pacific American men, says that such images contribute to a cultural devaluation of gay Asian male sexuality. According to GLAAD, 86 percent of the LGBT characters shown during the U.S. 2008–2009 television season were white; 19 percent were of Asian descent—mostly minor roles. LGBT media articles, like Out Magazine's "How to Gab in Gaysian" published in February 2005, are seen as perpetuating a perception of Asian gayness as foreign and outside the norm.

=== Lesbian East and Southeast Asian women in media ===
Lesbian East and Southeast Asian women are presented in more largely stereotyped, feminized roles, like Dragon Lady or China doll. Some support groups to combat these negative perceptions have been formed, like Yellow Kitties, an Australian-based LGBT organization.

Asian lesbian and bisexual women report a sense of invisibility in both LGBT community and U.S. culture as a whole, which is supplemented by a lack of representation of lesbian and bisexual Asian American women in mainstream media.

== Anti-Black racism ==
Many LGBT African American people report facing racism from the white LGBT community, leading some to repudiate labels such as "gay" and connections to white LGBT culture. The term same gender loving was coined by the activist Cleo Manago to describe people of African descent who are attracted to the same sex, as opposed to terms such as "gay/lesbian", "bisexual", or "queer". This term was meant to actively express pride in one's racial heritage.

Efforts to push gay rights forward alongside the black rights movement brought out opinions on their presence. Quotes by Frank Kameny include statements such as "Now that it is becoming unfashionable to discriminate against Negros, discrimination against homosexuals will be on the increase" and "no other Negros among the audience, but saw one [black person] disturbing [the] pamphlets."

Some Black gay men report discrimination and harassment from white gay men in gay bars and clubs. In the past, some gay bars would display signs that said "No Blacks, Fems, or Faggots", and similar phrases.

Some gay Black South African men have reported experiencing "grotesque racism" from white gay men during the time of Apartheid.

Chuck Knipp, a white gay male drag performer who is known for his blackface act "Shirley Q. Liquor", has been accused of racism. Responding to Knipp's declaration that the Liquor character "was created in celebration of, not to downgrade, black women", Jasmyne Cannick said in her blog: "... it is not possible for Charles Knipp, a white man, to help heal years of mistreatment and racism at the hands of his people by putting on a wig, speaking AAVE , and in blackface ... There is nothing remotely uplifting about Knipp's act and I wish people would stop defending his character with the tired argument that he's trying to heal the nation. The only thing Knipp is trying to heal is the hole in his pocket by filling it with all of the money he makes off of degrading Black people."

=== Struggling between two communities ===
Clarence Ezra Brown III has researched ways gay black males feel in their black and gay communities. Gay black males are stuck between two communities they believe they do not fit into. According to Keith Boykin, "The dirty little secret about the homosexual population is that white gay people are just as racist as white straight people." Those who do not see themselves as part of the LGBT community see it to be a white community with white experiences. Because gay black men face racism in the LGBT community, it is translating into the wider black community, meaning the only "support structures that speak to their perspective" continue to alienate them.

=== Sexual stereotyping ===
Some authors, such as Howard Stevenson Jr. and Mary Dianne Plummer, have written that much of the racism against LGBT black people is rooted in sexual racism and the linking of sex role stereotypes and racial stereotypes. Black men who express a sexual preference for white men have been alleged to be suffering from "an insidious legacy of white racism" that causes internalized racism in black men. Some Afrocentric gay men are opposed to interracial relationships, believing gay black men who prefer white men lack strong roots in the black community or are oblivious to racism. The anti-interracial Afrocentrists believe that instead of "hating their blackness," gay black men should only date other gay black men. A slogan that promotes black-on-black gay relationships is "black men loving black men," which was popularized by Joseph F. Beam's anthology In the Life and the Marlon Riggs video Tongues Untied.

Conversely, Rob Redding's book "The Professor: Witnessing White Power" uses empiricism to surmise that sleeping with white men gave some of the most prominent black men of our time like James Baldwin, Jean-Michel Basquiat, Marvin Gaye, and Richard Pryor a fearlessness when dealing with racist whites. He utilizes a mix of communication theories like proxemics, kinesics, and haptics along with an analysis of Jane Ward's book "Not Gay: Sex between Straight White Men" as a case study to explore how interracial relationships between men can be transformative for the black community. He states: "Ward, who is a lesbian, writes about power exchanges between white men. The Professor explores how gay interracial relationships and encounters may have empirically had an impact on the black community."

== Anti-Hispanic and anti-Latino sentiment ==
Gay Hispanic and Latino men report experiencing racism both within and outside the gay community. Latino gay men with dark skin color and indigenous features reported the greatest level of discrimination, including from the white gay community. Gay bars, for example, were spaces where Latinos and other people of color would face discrimination. This motivated the creation of the first and only Latino gay bar in the San Francisco Mission District in 1979, Esta Noche. Latina lesbians also report experiencing racism from the white LGBT community. Latin gays and lesbians have been engaged in autonomous organizing since the 1970s addressing issues of racism, sexism, and homophobia. The first Latina lesbian organization was founded in Los Angeles in the early 1980s and the National Latino/a Lesbian & Gay Organization (LLEGÓ) was founded in 1987, with Latino/an LGBT people choosing to organize separately due to both racism in the LGBT community and homophobia in the straight Latino community.

In 2006, Latino Americans staged a protest in The Castro, San Francisco, against anti-Latino sentiment in the LGBT community.

The 2016 Pulse nightclub shooting in Orlando, Florida, had a significant impact on discussions of race and ethnicity within LGBTQ+ communities. Some activists and academics have argued that the shooting unveiled the disparities in support services for LGBTQ+ Latinos in the Orlando area. Before the attack on the gay nightclub, local organizations that served LGBTQ+ needs were predominately oriented to the white and English-speaking members of the community. Similarly, many Latino focused organizations did not support LGBTQ+ concerns within the population.

The Pulse nightclub shooting occurred during the club's "Latin Night", and many of the 49 people killed were Latino members of the LGBTQ community. The shooting drew attention to the intersection of anti-LGBTQ+ violence and the experiences of racial minorities within LGBTQ+ communities. However, researchers have noted how the governmental responses became criticized for failing to explicitly acknowledge the attack's disproportionate impact on Latino and LGBTQ communities, furthering the discourse about the erasure of people with intersecting racial and sexual minoritized identities. Former governor of Florida, Rick Scott, did not reference any Latinx or LGBTQ+ groups when publicly discussing the Orlando Pulse shooting and invalidated the intersectional experiences of queer people of color by committing an act of identity erasure, which was his refusal to acknowledge the disproportionate impact the shooting had on LGBTQ+ Latinx Floridians.

Research has drawn attention to the racial disparities that affect queer people of color in obtaining access to affordable mental health resources. Many LGBTQ+ Latino survivors faced racism, homophobia, and trauma simultaneously. The intersection of their identities further unveiled the implicit biases within Orlando's community support organizations. Academic research journals identify racism within LGBTQ+ institutions and heterosexuality within racial community support as contributors to stress and disengagement with mental health treatment.

After the Pulse shooting occurred, Florida's queer Latino community became the forefront discussion of a crime that Latinos have never been seen as massive victims of in the past. During the year of the Pulse Tragedy, 2016, Florida was ranked 49th in the United States for mental health funding. An article by Joshua Barajas, a Senior Editor with PBS, identified that accessibility, comfortability, and language barriers were among the blockades many of the victims and other community members faced to any mental health support services. After acknowledging the disproportionate impact on Florida's Latino Community, several nonprofit organizations developed mental health, sexual health, and financial assistance programs for the families of the victims and survivors of the attack that were not readily available to them before.

Experiences of exclusion within a dominated norm of white centered LGBTQ+ organizations have led members of the Latinx community to advocate for political movements that intersect with racial justice, immigration, class inequality, and Queer rights, rather than treating these issues as their own singular forms. Additionally, studies show that research ideas of a linked fate, which is the belief that personal outcomes can be connected to those of a minoritized community, have the ability to encourage political participation among LGBTQ+ Latinx identifiers.

Racism has long affected Latinx LGBTQ+ political participation through the erasing and reframing of Gay politics and history. There is a historical marginalization of queer people of color within historical archives that has shaped how many Latinx individuals interact with politics of the current day. The absence of visibility in dominant areas of politics and other areas of the past is a form of racism that has had repercussions for the Latinx community within political conversations and in the context of civic participation.

The organization La Casa in East Los Angeles, California, exists to serve the LGBT Latino community and create a safe space, free from homophobia and racism. Members have expressed their experiences with "blatant racism" from the white LGBT community, particularly in West Hollywood.

However, it is important to remember that "queer latinidad is not a site with clearly defined boundaries" rather it varies in acceptance and mannerism based on where someone goes. There are Latino/an LGBT people who find support within their cultural communities and openly embrace their identities. Tatiana de la tierra was a lesbian Latina writer who was shameless about her sexuality, and a lot of her work provided support and encouragement for other Latina lesbians to be shameless and proud like her. She co-founded the magazine Esto no tiene nombre which was meant to combat the patterns of stigmatization, exclusion, and invisibility of queer Latinas by creating a platform for free discussion and expression of sexuality.

== Anti-Indigenous sentiment ==
=== Aboriginal Canadians ===
In Canada, lesbian Indigenous women report feeling marginalized from mainstream and LGBT cultures, and from Indigenous communities and other communities of color. Gay aboriginal men, many of whom also identify as two-spirited, often face homophobia within Indigenous communities and racism within the LGBT community.

=== Aboriginal Australians ===
Gay Australian Aboriginal men have reported a lack of inclusion and representation in the white-dominated LGBT community. When aboriginal men have been included in LGBT organizing efforts, it has often been in a tokenizing way.

=== Māori people in New Zealand ===
Takatāpui identity is a way for many LGBT Māori people to express their dual identities as both Māori and non-heterosexual. While the term fell into disuse for many years, it has recently been reclaimed as an expression of pride. Some Māori people have questioned the focus on same-sex marriage in the Pākehā (European New Zealand) LGBT community. In traditional Māori culture it was common for either straight or gay couples to be unmarried. The LGBT Māori people who critique the overemphasis on same-sex marriage believe focusing too narrowly on marital rights is harmful and reduces diversity in the LGBT community. They believe the focus on marriage is a product of "whiteness".

=== Native Americans ===
Some Native American lesbians report feeling disenchanted with White people—including white lesbians—and have established separatist communities exclusively for Native American women or for women of color. Native American lesbians have established communes in the American Midwest and Northern California, in an attempt to repudiate white culture, live self-sufficiently, and return to the traditions of their tribal ancestors.

== Anti-Italian sentiments ==
Some LGBT Italian Americans report experiencing anti-Italian discrimination from within the LGBT community. Italian American gay men, particularly darker-skinned men such as those of Sicilian descent, report experiencing sexual objectification from lighter-skinned and white men. In a manner similar to the way black, Asian, and Latino men are sometimes portrayed, Italian men are portrayed at times as "the object of desire of the white man" as well as being considered "exotic and well-endowed, oversexed and extremely passionate". These sexual stereotypes of Italian and Sicilian gay men also appear frequently in gay pornography, but are not exclusive to the gay community.

== Antisemitism ==
According to Warren Hoffman in writing for the Huffington Post, antisemitism is experienced by Jewish LGBT people on both racial and religious grounds, as well as racism against gay people of color, misogyny and transphobia.

Nikolay Alexeyev, a prominent LGBT rights activist in Russia, made antisemitic statements on his Facebook and Twitter accounts in 2014, targeting Michael Lucas with antisemitic slurs and claiming that a "Jewish mafia" ruled America and was "trying to overtake the world."

In 2024, Eshel and A Wider Bridge conducted a survey among queer Jews to understand how they have experienced antisemitism in the aftermath of the October 7 attacks and the subsequent Gaza war. According to the study, 82% of queer Jews were either “kicked out, “blocked,” “experienced verbal harassment,” “or made to feel uncomfortable” in online queer spaces. LGBTQ Jews who wear identifiable Jewish symbols are 25% more likely to experience antisemitic harassment than straight and cisgender peers. 56% reported that they have stopped engaging in the LGBTQ community, or are hiding their identity, due to antisemitism. 41% had stopped frequenting LGBTQ spaces due to antisemitism, and 43% had done the same in online spaces. Queer Rabbi and social justice activist Amichai Lau-Lavie reported no longer feeling welcome in queer places because of progressive former allies' failure to condemn antisemitism, such as at a pro-Palestinian demonstration in early 2024, where rainbow flag-clad protesters chanted, “Kill the Jews.”

=== Lesbian antisemitism ===
According to the Encyclopedia of Lesbian Histories and Cultures, lesbian feminist organizations do not discuss antisemitism when discussing the fighting of oppression because they believe it no longer exists or is not as important as racism or homophobia. Some lesbian feminists have accused Jews of being "killers of the Goddess" because they believe the god of Israel is male or androgynous. Jews are also often blamed for patriarchy. Some sexual roleplays done by gays and lesbians play out Nazi/Jew fetishes in a sado-masochistic fashion and Jewish lesbians are often invisible in the lesbian community. Some lesbians wear swastikas both during and outside their sex lives in attempts to transform the symbol or ignore the impact it has on the Jewish community.

In 2017, three Jewish lesbians were expelled from Chicago's Dyke March because of their Stars of David/"Pride" flags. After multiple articles were published criticizing of the actions of the Chicago Dyke March Collective, the group decided to fund a "healing retreat" for its members.

== Anti-Turkish sentiment ==
LGBT people of Turkish descent in Germany often report experiencing "triple discrimination"; racism and Islamophobia from the non-Turkish German community and homophobia from the heterosexual Turkish and German communities. While Turkish-Germans "still face racism in the [gay] scene", the level of racism has declined in the past 20 years. Murat Bahşi, a former board member of the organization Gays and Lesbians of Turkish Backgrounds (GLADT), has said racism and racial stereotypes from ethnic German men often contributed to the disintegration of inter-ethnic relationships between Turkish and German men.

== Antiziganism ==
Romani people in Romania, including homosexual Romani, face antiziganism from the non-Romani LBGT community in the country. When American singer Madonna publicly condemned homophobia and antiziganism in Eastern Europe during her 2008 Sticky & Sweet Tour, several members of the Romanian LGBT community criticized her online for linking homophobia to antiziganism. In their rebuttals to Madonna's statements, several Romanian commentators referred to LGBT people as "decent civilised people" while characterizing the Romani as "thieves" and "criminals" who are incompatible with "civilised society". On LGBT dating sites in Romania, many Romani report seeing "no gypsies please" on user profiles, while some LGBT Romani have stated that a lack of adequate representation in Romanian media leads to antiziganist perceptions among non-Romani Romanians. In addition, many LGBT Romani face homophobia from their own communities as well, typically from conservative families. A 2017 study by the Romanian National Council Against Discrimination found that LGBT and Romani people in Romania are among the most discriminated groups in the country.

== Gay Neo-Nazism ==
The National Socialist League in the United States limited its membership to gay Aryans. The documentary Men, Heroes and Gay Nazis addressed the phenomenon of gay neo-Nazis in Germany. Michael Kühnen and Nicky Crane were gay neo-Nazis. The Order of the Jarls of Baelder, a satanic fascist organization based in the United Kingdom, encouraged homoeroticism as a form of male bonding.

== See also ==
- Homophobia in ethnic minority communities
- Interminority racism in the United States
- Racial fetishism
- Romantic racism
