= Astraea Lesbian Foundation for Justice =

International foundation for LGBT rights

- Founded: 1977
- Type: Private foundation
- Tax ID no.: 13-2992977
- Purpose: LGBTQ and intersex rights
- Location: New York, NY, United States
- Region served: Worldwide
- Method: Grantmaking
- Key people: Joy Chia (executive director)
- Revenue: $6,393,933 (2013)
- Expenses: $6,604,625 (2013)
- Website: www.astraeafoundation.org

The Astraea Lesbian Foundation for Justice is an international charitable foundation based in the United States focused on human rights of LGBT people, intersex people, and people of color. The organization provide grants to individuals and organizations, promotes philanthropy, and provides capacity building assistance.

== History ==
Astraea Lesbian Foundation for Justice was founded in 1977 by a small group of diverse women to increase funding for human rights of lesbian women and women of color, based on lesbian feminism.

== Activities ==
Astraea Lesbian Foundation for Justice works to connect the LGBTQI community to philanthropists and activists around the world. They solicit and invite grant proposals from individuals and organizations in the United States and internationally working on LGBT advocacy – especially around areas of the arts as well as racial, economic, social, and gender justice. For example, from 1992 to 1994, Astraea helped fund Esto no tiene nombre, a magazine created (in part by tatiana de la tierra) to explore and provide a platform for discussion about Latina lesbian culture. In 2012, the organization awarded 152 grants totaling US$1,310,624 to 113 organizations and 16 individuals across 36 countries.

The organization also promotes philanthropy and capacity building. Their policy of "Philanthropy of Inclusion" is founded on their concept of including people from all socioeconomic strata in philanthropic activism. They have both a domestic fund and an international fund, which they distribute to organizations coming from places including Eastern Europe, Africa, Asia, Latin America, the Middle East, and the Caribbean.

The Astraea Lesbian Writer's Fund raises funds for LGBT artists and promotes the writing of authors such as Audre Lorde, Dorothy Allison, Gloria E. Anzaldúa, Cheryl Clarke, Eileen Myles, Jewelle Gomez, Chrystos, and Sharon Bridgforth.

The organisation also established the first Intersex Human Rights Fund, in late 2014.
