= Esto no tiene nombre (magazine) =

Esto no tiene nombre (Spanish: "This has no name") was a Latina lesbian magazine published 1991-1994, which was succeeded by Conmoción 1995-1996.

It was published in Miami, Florida and was founded by tatiana de la tierra, Vanessa Cruz, Patricia Pereira-Pujol and Margarita Castilla. It published works by Latina lesbians, from the United States and elsewhere, in English, Spanish and Spanglish, including poetry, fiction, essays, reviews, news, interviews, comics and artwork. Some contributors were established writers, others publishing for the first time.

The successor title's full name was Conmoción, revista y red revolucionaria de lesbianas latinas.

== History: Las Salamandras de Ambiente ==
Esto no tiene nombre began in large part as a result of the meetings and exchanges of a group of Latina lesbian women that called themselves “Las Salamandras de Ambiente.” De Ambiente meant “in the life” and Las Salamandras comes from some faulty research that suggested that salamanders’ reproduction was female-centered, meaning they could hatch eggs without the help of a male, making them “lesbians”.

Regardless of the name, the group, composed of women with origins all over Latin America, met up every week in Miami Florida for different events. Out of these frequent meetings and exchanges, it became clear that many of the women had similar life stories and shared struggles. tatiana de la tierra and some others from the group configured the means to create a newsletter/magazine, esto no tiene nombre, in order to get some of these Latina lesbians’ stories told.

== About Esto no tiene nombre ==
Esto no tiene nombre translates to “this has no name,” and was named this because the editors could not choose between some of the proposed names and because the idea of “not being able to name the lesbian desire”. Vanessa Cruz and Patricia Pereira-Pujol, both from Puerto Rico, also suggested the name as a twist on a phrase used in their country to indicate when something is "too much for words." The editors of Esto, including tatiana de la tierra, Margarita Castilla, Vanessa Cruz, and Patricia Pereira-Pujol, wanted to use the magazine as a forum for discussion within the community about the Latina lesbian culture, struggles, and representation and as a tool to increase their visibility. They aimed to include any and all material sent in by a Latino lesbian, although the involvement of some members made this difficult. They retained the work's original language as well, including pieces in Spanish, English, and Spanglish.

Esto’s first issue, published on September 23, 1991, caused immediate conflict within Las Salamandras. Some people did not like the way they were being represented in the oft-erotic or graphic language used, even calling it pornographic at times, while others wanted the magazine to be completely uncensored. After only the second issue of Esto, in March 1992, tatiana, Margarita, Patricia, and Vanessa decided to break off from the rest of Las Salamandras at around the same moment that Las Salamandras decided to retract all support for the magazine and its content. The decision was made clear after tatiana de la tierra wrote and published a review of lesbian sex videos.

Out of contempt and being partly comical, tatiana described the group as: “Lizard-like lesbianas who can’t take the heat. They stay low to the ground and hump hidden in the shadows of shame. Salamandras are the riff-raff of the race, Christian comemierda pets of the right-wing machine, pious pendejas who become skittish in the presence of potent sinvergüenzas.”

The four editors (tatiana de la tierra, Margarita Castilla, Vanessa Cruz, and Patricia Pereira-Pujol) continued to publish anyway. Their policy, without the criticism of las Salamandras to hold them back, was to publish anything that any Latina lesbian sent in to the magazine editors, no matter what they had to say.

Copies of Esto no tiene nombre were sent all over the United States, Mexico, Latin America, and the Caribbean. The group survived financially on funds received from different foundations like Astraea, Open Meadows Foundation, and RESIST in addition to the small amount of revenue from actual magazine sales. Nine issues of Esto no tiene nombre were published using contributions from 68 Latina Lesbians across the world.

== Conmoción ==
=== About Conmoción ===
Conmoción was the revival of Esto, and it came back with even greater force because of its strong international reach and acquirement of up-and-coming Latina lesbian authors and academics. It provided news, nonfiction, fiction, poetry, and photography and was funded in large part by foundations like the Funding Exchange's Out, Astraea, Chicago Resource Center, and Mama Cash. The editor's note in the first edition reads: “conmoción is an international Latina lesbian vision that uses the published word to empower and terrorize, to destroy and create. We publish, support and develop any type of activity that leads to the betterment and greater visibility of Latina lesbians.” The three issues of the magazine included work from 84 contributors from 38 cities around the world.

As tatiana de la tierra explains, "'Commotion' (conmoción) and “with motion” (con moción), [is] a powerful combination that alludes to social disturbances, earthly tremors, and all kinds of tumult. conmoción is a fury, a fervor, an endless fuck, a tempest you don't wanna tango with unless you're conmocionada, too!"

=== Content ===
Tatiana de la tierra was the editor and Amy Concepcion was her associate editor. The first issue was published in 1995 and devoted to activism. It featured writers like Achy Obejas, Cherríe Moraga, Carmen Vasquez, and Luzmaría Umpierre, writing about a variety of topics ranging from personal anecdotes to cultural activism.

The second issue, also published in 1995, was dedicated to erotica and the celebration of pleasure. It featured writers such as Erika Lopez and Loana dP Valencia. This issue was everything the editors of esto no tiene nombre had wished they could get by with...and more. It featured erotic photographs and artwork, and writings ranging from kinky poems to a piece warning readers about HIV.

One such article, written by Loana dP Valencia and entitled “Wanna Be a Puta” explores the politics of sexual representation in a direct, upfront, confrontational style which is typical of the magazine and its editors. It included a highly erotic photograph of Valencia and empowering exclamations that attempt to reclaim the words “jota” and “puta” with pride rather than shame. Some conflict arose when a well-written erotic piece was rejected because it contained the presence of a male penis. Other pieces with a penis had been accepted in the past because they only had “lesbian dicks” like dildos. This is a clear example of the separatist strategy that the editors of Conmoción adopted, striving to create a clear-cut space for Latina lesbians.

The third issue was also the last because many of the magazine's distributors had filed for bankruptcy. It was published in 1996 and focused on identity. It featured Latina writers such as Patricia Meoño Picado, Theresa Becerril, and Juana María Rodriguez and covered topics ranging from insightful essays on identity to an entry entitled “100% Latina Lesbian Checklist” which satirically describes components that make up a Latina lesbian.

==== La telaraña ====
As a part of Conmoción, tatiana de la tierra and Lesley Salas created La telaraña, a web page meant to be a space for Latina lesbian writers to share. De la tierra wrote academic and creative pieces on the page to share about herself and to provoke discussion. In addition, de la tierra also edited a newsletter called La telarañazo which was directed toward up and coming Latina lesbian writers.

== Cultural Context ==
Prior to the 1980s, the only accessible literature regarding women's sexuality was associated with white feminist culture. So when tatiana de la tierra, and Latina lesbian women like her, searched for some representation of themselves in literature, they often came up with nothing. De la tierra expressed that not finding herself in print felt equivalent to not existing at all, and that bibliographic invisibility dis-empowers the entire Latin@ community as a result. To take it a step further, de la tierra also believed that homophobia has a major influence on production and distribution of printed works. So the combined racism and homophobia, expressed through the omission of peoples from bibliographic texts, both contribute to the almost complete invisibility of the Latin@ LGBT community. Latina lesbians are also especially underrepresented in mainstream culture, typically being rashly stereotyped when they do appear.

In addition to the culture of racism and homophobia that omits Latina lesbians from American history, Latin American people also contribute to the marginalization of the lesbian community. In her essay, “The L Word(s) Among Us in the Library World,” tatiana de la tierra explains how even in REFORMA, the National Association to Promote Library and Information Services to Latinos and Spanish-Speaking, an organization created to represent the whole Latino community, there is a conspicuous lack of queer representation. De la tierra also describes another instance where a Latin@ publication rejected her interview about For the Hard Ones: A Lesbian Phenomenology because of its graphic literary sexual imagery of lesbianism.

These occasions point to the greater lack of acknowledgement and/or validation of the lesbian existence in both Latino and Anglo cultures and to other obstacles like religion and family values of Latino cultures. Latina lesbians are generally stereotyped as traitors who have forsaken their roots. An example of this sentiment is seen in Mexican culture, where, Cherrie Moraga explains, Chicana lesbians are seen as Malinche figures – they are seen as being corrupted by foreign influences and traitors of the race because they contribute to the “genocide” of their people, regardless of whether or not they have children. These stereotypes and stigmas regarding lesbians in Latino culture have been so historically ingrained in these cultures that most women who Katie Acosta interviewed in her study for Lesbians in the Borderlands who have spoken openly to their families about their sexuality still felt silenced.

The result of these ingrained prejudices is what Gloria Anzaldúa calls the “mestiza consciousness". Latina lesbian women (in the United States especially) must straddle multiple cultures at once and take on somewhat contradictory identities. Being a lesbian in Latin culture poses strong obstacles, but being Latina in American culture is also extremely difficult. Latina lesbians are most often slightly “othered” by the Latino community and by the queer community. Therefore, Latina lesbians often must distance themselves from their families and origins enough to create for themselves a “borderland” space where they can freely express their sexuality.

The purpose of Esto no tiene nombre was to combat these patterns of stigmatization, exclusion, and invisibility by creating a safe space for the discussion of Latina lesbian culture. Esto was meant to be a reflection of the Latina lesbian women who created it. Esto has no contemporary equivalent, and although there have been other Latina magazines in more recent years, none of them have the reach and inclusiveness that Esto exhibited with its international focus and distribution.
