= Ed Buck =

American political donor and convicted murderer

- Born: Edward Bernard Peter Buckmelter; August 24, 1954 (age 72); Steubenville, Ohio, U.S.
- Education: Phoenix College
- Occupation: Businessman
- Known for: Major political donor in West Hollywood, California
- Status: Incarcerated
- Convictions: Distribution of methamphetamine resulting in death (21 U.S.C. § 841); Maintaining a drug-involved premises (21 U.S.C. § 856); Enticement to travel in interstate commerce for prostitution (18 U.S.C. § 2422) (2 counts)
- Criminal charges: Maintaining a drug house (State); Battery causing serious injury (State); Administering methamphetamine (State)
- Penalty: 30 years imprisonment

Edward Bernard Peter Buck (né Buckmelter; born August 24, 1954) is an American convicted felon and political donor to the Democratic Party, notably Hillary Clinton, Adam Schiff, and Ted Lieu. Starting in politics as the leader of the movement to recall Governor Evan Mecham in Arizona, Buck achieved prominence as a major Democratic Party donor while living in West Hollywood, California, during which time he killed several black male prostitutes by methamphetamine injection.

Two African-American men, the first in 2017 and the second in 2019, were discovered dead in Buck's West Hollywood home, later to be determined as due to drug overdoses. Several reports indicated that Buck had a history of bringing African-American men to his house, where he would reportedly inject them with high doses of crystal methamphetamine for sexual gratification. He plied the men with drugs and then sexually assaulted them while they were unconscious or immobile.

In January 2019, a coalition of 50 civil rights organizations called for law enforcement to investigate the matter. On September 17, 2019, Buck was arrested and charged with three counts of battery causing serious injury, administering methamphetamine and maintaining a drug house. He was convicted of nine federal charges in 2021; on April 14, 2022, Buck was sentenced to 30 years in prison.

== Early life ==
Edward Bernard Peter Buckmelter was born in Steubenville, Ohio. He grew up in Phoenix, Arizona, where he was educated at North High School and graduated from Phoenix College.

== Career ==
Buck began his career as a fashion model in Europe, where he also acted in television commercials and two movies. He worked for a friend's company, Rapid Information Services, before buying it out of bankruptcy for US$250,000 and renaming it Gopher Courier. Buck became a millionaire upon selling it after five years.

Buck led the campaign to recall Arizona Republican governor Evan Mecham, founding the Mecham Recall Committee in 1987. The committee claimed over 10,000 volunteers statewide, and collected nearly 400,000 signatures from Arizona voters supporting a recall. He announced the campaign on December 21, 1986, before Mecham had even been sworn in, and was the "leader" of a protest on the day of Mecham's inauguration.

Buck distributed bumper stickers that read "Mecham for Ex-Governor", and Arizona Attorney General Robert K. Corbin ruled that state employees were allowed to use them on their cars. According to The Arizona Republic, the anti-Mecham campaign "made Buck a household name in Arizona," and he was attacked by Arizonans for Traditional Family Values chairman Julian Sanders. Buck switched his registration from Republican to Democrat in 1988.

After moving to West Hollywood, California, Buck ran unsuccessfully for city council in 2007. He also served on the steering committee of the Stonewall Democratic Club. Buck donated more than $500,000 to political candidates and causes, almost all of them linked to the Democratic Party, including contributions to candidates Hillary Clinton, Ted Lieu, Pete Aguilar, Adam Schiff, and Raja Krishnamoorthi.

== Criminal investigations ==
On July 27, 2017, a young African-American man named Gemmel Moore died in Buck's apartment. Paramedics found Moore, who had worked as an escort, naked on a mattress in the living room with a "male pornography movie playing on the television", according to a Los Angeles County coroner's report. A spokesman for the coroner's office, Ed Winter, said Buck was inside his Laurel Avenue home at the time of Moore's death and that drug paraphernalia was recovered from the scene. Police found sex toys, syringes, and "clear plastic bags with suspected methamphetamine in a tool box roll-cabinet in the living room", 24 syringes with brown residue, five glass pipes with white residue and burn marks, a plastic straw with possible white residue, clear plastic bags with white powdery residue, and a clear plastic bag with a "piece of crystal-like substance". Moore's mother, LaTisha Nixon, skeptical of the claim that her son had accidentally overdosed, wrote an email to various newspapers and local TV news stations. She was introduced to Jasmyne Cannick, a local writer, activist and political candidate, by another reporter who thought Jasmyne could help her. The death was investigated by the Los Angeles County Sheriff's Department, and Los Angeles County District Attorney Jackie Lacey declined to charge Buck on July 26, 2018. Jasmyne Cannick criticized Lacey's decision, writing on Twitter that any further deaths at Ed's residence would be Lacey's responsibility.

Since the death of Gemmel Moore, multiple reports have indicated that Buck had a history of luring young, Black gay men to his apartment, where he would inject them with crystal methamphetamine for sexual gratification.

On January 7, 2019, another African-American man, 55-year-old Timothy Michael Dean (a part-time adult film actor known professionally as Hole Hunter), died at Buck's home. Following Dean's death, a coalition of 50 civil rights organizations released a statement calling on local law enforcement to conduct a thorough investigation of Buck's role in the incident and calling on elected officials to return all contributions received from Buck.

Buck was arrested on September 17, 2019, and charged with three counts of battery causing serious injury, administering methamphetamine and maintaining a drug house, according to the Los Angeles County district attorney's office. He was accused of having injected a 37-year-old man, who overdosed but survived, with methamphetamine on September 11.

On September 19, 2019, a federal charge of "one count of distribution of methamphetamine resulting in death" was added by the United States for the death of Gemmel Moore, who died on July 27, 2017. That death had originally been ruled an accidental methamphetamine overdose by the Los Angeles County Department of Medical Examiner-Coroner.

On August 4, 2020, a federal grand jury charged Buck with four additional felonies, bringing the total number of federal charges to nine counts. Buck was scheduled to go to trial on January 19, 2021, but the date was postponed to April 20, 2021, due to COVID-19-related considerations.

On July 27, 2021, Buck was convicted of nine federal charges, including the deaths of Gemmel Moore and Timothy Dean, maintaining a drug den, distributing methamphetamines, and solicitation of prostitutes. On April 14, 2022, Buck was sentenced to 30 years in prison.

== Personal life ==
Buck came out to his parents as gay at the age of 16. He was the grand marshal of the 1989 International Gay Rodeo. Buck formerly lived near Piestewa Peak in Phoenix, Arizona. He moved to West Hollywood in 1991.
