= Interminority racism in the United States =

Prejudice or discrimination between racial minorities in the US

In the United States, economic competition and racial prejudice have both contributed to long-lasting tensions between racial and ethnic minorities.

== US public policy ==
Current US policy advocates a multiculturalist discourse to acknowledge multiracial difference. Multiculturalist theorists such as Claire Jean Kim criticize this contemporary policy because it refuses to acknowledge the interminority inequalities and antagonisms generated by changing demographics.

== African American–Latino relations ==
With the increasing population of Hispanic and Latino Americans in the United States, there are areas of competition for housing, jobs and other resources with African Americans. Tensions in communities have also been reflected in racial tensions between these ethnic groups in prisons. In several significant riots in California prisons, for instance, Latino and black inmates targeted each other over racial issues. There have been reports of racially motivated attacks by gangs against African Americans who have moved into neighborhoods occupied mostly by Hispanic Americans, and vice versa.

== African American–Jewish relations ==
African Americans and Jewish Americans have interacted throughout much of the history of the United States. This relationship has included widely publicized cooperation and conflict, and it has been an area of significant academic research since the 1970s. Cooperation during the Civil Rights Movement was strategic and significant, culminating in the Civil Rights Act of 1964.

The relationship has also featured conflicts and controversies which are related to such topics as the Black Power movement, Zionism, affirmative action, and the antisemitic trope concerning the alleged dominant role of American and Caribbean-based Jews in the Atlantic slave trade.

== African American–Asian American relations ==
Because of the centuries of abuses from historic slavery and its aftermath, discussions of racial tension in the United States have often focused on black-white relations. This has failed to include the perspective of Asian Americans in racial discourse. Some Asian Americans feel stuck in limbo, as they have had differences and suffered discrimination from other ethnic groups. At the same time, Asian Americans have been extolled as the “model minority”, because of their record of achievement and statistically high reported educational scores and incomes. But not all are equally successful.

While African Americans and Asian Americans have both faced historical and current racial discrimination from whites, the means of discrimination have often taken different forms. In addition, these two groups (which encompass numerous ancestral backgrounds) have also competed for jobs, education and resources over the decades, and have displayed tensions toward each other.

=== History ===
Under the Naturalization Act of 1790, only "free white person(s)" were eligible to be naturalized as American citizens with full rights. While the intention at the time was to avoid granting enslaved African Americans and free blacks the same privileges as European American colonists, future waves of immigrants brought ethnicities from different areas, such as those from Asia and Africa, without full naturalization.

Before the 1870 census, ethnic Asians and Asian Americans were classified as "white" in the official census. They began to be called "model minorities" because they established a societal reputation for "hard work". But in the West, which had such a high rate of Asian immigrants that there was white resistance to their presence, the majority passed laws and courts ruled against allowing them the same rights as European Americans. For instance, in the California court case, People v. Hall, the court found that people of Asian descent could not testify under existing legal acts that prohibited testimony from people of African descent. According to the California Supreme Court in 1854, the court ruled that "[T]he words ‘Black person’...must be taken as contradistinguished from White, and necessarily excludes all races other than the Caucasian”. As the 19th century progressed, white resistance resulted in Acts of Congress such as the Chinese Exclusion Act of 1882 and the Geary Act of 1892, which effectively barred further immigration of Asians until the 20th century.

While their numbers were few in the South, Chinese immigrants were recruited as laborers by planters in the early 20th century. They worked to get out of the fields, establishing small community groceries and similar businesses. They also worked to distinguish themselves from the restrictions of racial segregation that African Americans were forced to endure. In 1927, a Chinese family in Mississippi brought suit challenging its daughters' expulsion from a local school for white students. In the binary system of the time, the school system had classified the girls as non-white and therefore prohibited. The state Supreme Court upheld the local decision. It ruled that state law defined whites as specifically Caucasian and said that if the girls attended public school, they would have to go to one for "black" students, as all other ethnicities than white were classified (including Native Americans). Their parents knew that these schools were poorly funded and lower in quality than those provided to white students. In Lum v. Rice, the US Supreme Court unanimously affirmed that decision, holding that it was not a violation of the Fourteenth Amendment for states to classify students by race and segregate them on that basis. Early 20th-century Asian nationals, such as Japanese immigrants, were prohibited from owning land or businesses in some states. If their American-born children were old enough, property was put in their name instead.

The rate of Asian immigration and naturalization increased following the Immigration and Naturalization Law of 1952, which repealed previous limits to Asian immigration. This allowed for the de jure protection of Asian immigration into the United States. But it did not protect such immigrants and their descendants from the varieties of de facto prejudice, bullying, hate crimes, and segregation faced by ethnic minorities. Certain European American immigrants also faced such discrimination.

As Asian Americans established their niches in society, they faced discrimination from white Americans who treated them like they did African Americans at the time. With members of organizations like the Ku Klux Klan intimidating, assaulting, bullying, and attacking Asian Americans (particularly Chinese Americans), the arrival of the civil rights movement and its successive laws helped codify the rights and protections of ethnic minorities. Despite facing similar attacks on their cultures and people, Asian Americans and African Americans sometimes found themselves divided and clashing within the 20th century.

==== The role of Asian Americans according to the middleman theory ====
The tension and division between Asian Americans and African Americans can be explained via an analysis of the role which ethnic minorities have played within American society as a whole. As more ethnic groups began to enter the civil discourse in the United States, the media and social figures began to paint these groups as subdivisions of the white-black divide. American society often lumps Asian Americans' successes together with European Americans' successes. The successes of Asian Americans are frequently compared to the struggles of African Americans, who may believe that attempts to lump the struggles of the two ethnic groups together can negate their own struggles. Comparatively, Asian Americans and African Americans are socially considered parts of the same minority culture that other non-white ethnic groups are considered parts of, in contrast to "white" culture. The divisions are even more pronounced through what has been identified as the "middle man theory".

This idea has been used to describe the relationship that Asian Americans often play between European Americans and African Americans. It suggests that one group acts as a linking partner to other groups, where these groups are typically divided by class or race. In this case, Asian Americans have played the role of middlemen between African Americans and European Americans. Particularly among early generations of immigrants and their children, they established niches as shopkeepers and merchants.

Within this relationship, Asian Americans may be seen to profit from their dealings with members of both ethnic groups, which can fuel the stereotype of the "model minority" among European Americans, as well as a distrust of Asian Americans among African Americans. From this viewpoint, their societal privileges can lead to Asian Americans being viewed as the same as European Americans by African Americans in terms of having a larger median income as well as receiving on average lighter punishments from the American judicial system. Meanwhile, a significant percentage of Asian Americans share a view with European Americans that African Americans "aren't capable of getting ahead", according to a study conducted by the National Conference of Christians and Jews. This sentiment flared especially during the era of racial tension in Los Angeles surrounding the Rodney King case.

==== 1992 Los Angeles riots ====
Los Angeles was inhabited by a large number of Korean Americans in the years leading up to 1992. As people migrated from Korea during and after the Korean War, many moved to settle in Los Angeles, but could not work in the same traditionally white collar jobs they held back home. Instead, many opened up businesses in areas where the rent was cheap in predominantly African American communities. Korean American and African American community leaders soon realized that tensions existed and they were predominantly due to differences in culture as well as a language barrier. This came to a head when Soon Ja Du, a Korean grocer, shot and killed a black teenage girl, whom she suspected of stealing from her store, and received a remarkably light sentence compared to sentences imposed on African Americans in the judicial system at the time.

Relations worsened during the 1992 Los Angeles riots, as riots and protests hit 2,200 Korean small businesses. African Americans felt cheated by the judicial system, as they had faced much more stringent punishments for charges involving an armed weapon, while Korean Americans felt targeted and attacked by the African American community for having their businesses destroyed. This led to Korean Americans being divided by those who felt abandoned and betrayed by the police and those who felt threatened by African Americans in their community.

== Irish American–African American relations ==
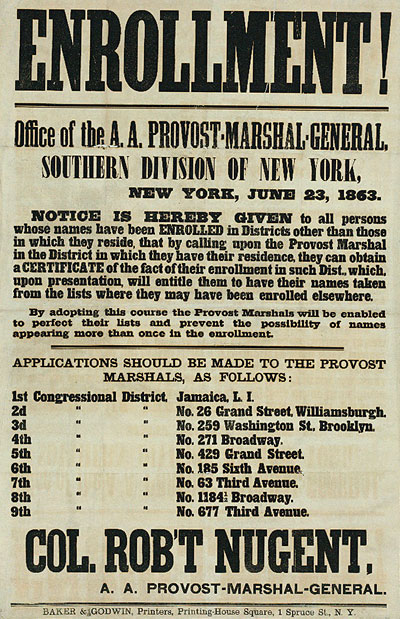
A recruiting poster in New York City in June 1863 for the Enrollment Act, also known as the Civil War Military Draft Act, which authorized the federal government to conscript troops for the Union army

The New York City draft riots (July 13–16, 1863), sometimes referred to as the Manhattan draft riots and known at the time as Draft Week, were violent disturbances in Lower Manhattan, widely regarded as the culmination of working-class discontent with new laws passed by Congress that year to draft men to fight in the ongoing American Civil War. The protests turned into a race riot against African Americans by Irish American rioters. President Abraham Lincoln diverted several regiments of militia and volunteer troops after the Battle of Gettysburg to control the city. The official death toll was listed at either 119 or 120. One historian estimated a loss in killed and wounded of 1000, most of whom were of the mob, and a probable damage to private property of $1,500,000 (equivalent to $39,200,000 in 2025). According to another historian, 18 people are known to have been killed by the rioters, 11 of whom were Black.

The riots were one of the largest civil urban disturbances in American history. Conditions in the city were such that Major General John E. Wool, commander of the Department of the East, said on July 16 that "Martial law ought to be proclaimed, but I have not a sufficient force to enforce it." According to Toby Joyce, the riot represented a "civil war" within the city's Irish community, in that "mostly Irish American rioters confronted police, [while] soldiers, and pro-war politicians ... were also to a considerable extent from the local Irish immigrant community."

The military did not reach the city until the second day of rioting, by which time the mobs had ransacked or destroyed numerous public buildings, two Protestant churches, the homes of various abolitionists or sympathizers, many black homes, and the Colored Orphan Asylum at 44th Street and Fifth Avenue, which was burned to the ground. The area's demographics changed as a result of the riot. Many black residents left Manhattan permanently with many moving to Brooklyn. By 1865, the black population had fallen below 11,000 for the first time since 1820.

== Examples ==
- 1992 Los Angeles Riots
- Crown Heights Riot
- New York City draft riots

== See also ==
- African American–Jewish relations
- Antisemitism in the United States
- Antisemitism in the United States in the 21st century
- Discrimination in the United States
- Gangs in the United States are frequently a vehicle for inter-ethnic conflict
- Geography of antisemitism#United States
- Historical racial and ethnic demographics of the United States
- History of antisemitism in the United States
- History of immigration to the United States
- Homophobia in ethnic minority communities
- Immigration to the United States
- Index of racism-related articles
- Mass racial violence in the United States
- Native American–Jewish relations
- Nativism (politics)#United States
- Nativism in United States politics
- Race and crime in the United States
- Race and ethnicity in the United States
- Racism against African Americans
- Racism against Asians#United States
- Racism by country
- Racism in Jewish communities
- Racism in the LGBT community
- Racism in Muslim communities
- Racism in North America
- Racism in the United States
- Xenophobia#United States
- Xenophobia and racism related to the COVID-19 pandemic#United States
- Xenophobia in the United States
