= Crystal Jang =

American LGBT activist (born 1946)

- Born: November 15, 1946 (age 79); San Francisco, California
- Occupation: LGBT activist

Crystal Jang is an LGBT activist based in San Francisco, California. She is one of the co-founders of the San Francisco Bay Area based organization, Asian Pacific Islander Queer Women and Transgender Community (APIQWTC), as well as community-based organization Older Asian Sisters in Solidarity (OASIS), which is now a part of APIQWTC.

== Personal life and history ==
Jang was born in San Francisco on November 15, 1946, to Bruce and Elaine Jang, who were third generation Chinese-American. She is a 3rd generation native San Franciscan and 4th generation Chinese-American. In 1961, at age 13, she came out of the closet. She is married to Sydney Yeong and has one child, named Camie.

== Activism ==
In the 1970s, she began organizing around Asian and Pacific Islander LGBT issues, speaking on college campuses as well as taking part in the first San Francisco Health Department trainings on Gay Issues. Jang also coordinated the first district-wide LGBTQ sensitivity trainings, as well as the first teacher training on transgender issues as San Francisco Unified School District’s first middle school coordinator for sexual minority youth and families. She was the first Asian Pacific Islander in the San Francisco Unified School District to publicly identify as LGBT.

In 1991, "frustrated with the lack of mature lesbian groups in San Francisco," she organized with other Asian and Pacific Islander lesbians and founded Older Asian Sisters in Solidarity (OASIS), whose members are of age 35 or older.

In 2013, she served as the Grand Marshal of the San Francisco Pride Parade, and received the Phoenix Award at APIQWTC's Lunar New Year Banquet.

== See also ==
- Asian Pacific Islander Queer Women and Transgender Community
- Timeline of Asian and Pacific Islander Diasporic LGBT History
