= Asian Pacific Islander Queer Women and Transgender Community =

Non-profit organization in California, US

- Abbreviation: APIQWTC
- Predecessor: API Lunar New Year Banquet
- Formation: 1999; 27 years ago
- Website: www.apiqwtc.org

Asian Pacific Islander Queer Women Transgender Community (APIQWTC) is an all-volunteer, non-profit organization in the San Francisco Bay Area that provides opportunities for Asian & Pacific Islander queer women and transgender people to socialize, network, build community, engage in inter-generational organizing, and increase community visibility.

== History ==
APIQWTC grew out of the API Lunar New Year Banquet, founded in 1987 by a small group of queer and transgender Asian women. APIQWTC was officially founded in 1999 by Crystal Jang, Koko Lin, and Trinity Ordona, as a new hub for established and new community groups to exchange news and coordinate projects in the San Francisco Bay Area. Over time, it evolved from a network to a community organization.

In 2012, the co-founders reported that APIQWTC provides the space for an estimated 1,000 queer women and transgender individuals of Asian descent to gather and celebrate who they are. APIQWTC is a space for "many queer women and transgender Asians [who] live in the closet in fear of losing their family and community." Today, its membership boasts 800 members, possibly the largest Asian lesbian/transgender organization on the West Coast.

== Activities ==
APIQWTC hosts the following events and activities annually: Lunar New Year Banquet; Summer Barbeque; Phoenix Award; Community Artist award; Trips; Support for community LGBT organizations; Monthly Meet-ups. Every year, APIQWTC provides two scholarship to deserving API LGBT students pursuing higher education. During the yearly banquet, an API LGBT organization is designated to receive a percentage of the annual banquet receipts to further its mission.
