= Achy Obejas =

Cuban-American writer and translator (born 1956)

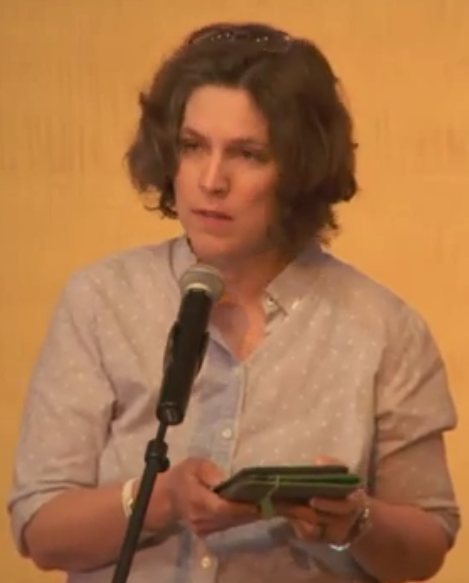
- Reading at the San Francisco Public Library in 2014
- Born: June 28, 1956 (age 70); Havana, Cuba
- Occupations: Novelist, journalist
- Writing career
- Notable work: Days of Awe
- Notable awards: Lambda Literary Awards (x2)
- Website: www.achyobejas.com

Achy Obejas (born June 28, 1956) is a Cuban-American writer and translator whose work focuses on personal and national identity issues. She lives in Benicia, California. She frequently writes on her sexuality and nationality, and she has received numerous awards for her creative work. Obejas' stories and poems have appeared in Prairie Schooner, Fifth Wednesday Journal, TriQuarterly, Another Chicago Magazine and many other publications. Some of her work was originally published in Esto no tiene nombre, a Latina lesbian magazine published and edited by tatiana de la tierra, which gave voice to the Latina lesbian community. Obejas worked as a journalist in Chicago for more than two decades. For several years, she was also writer in residence at the University of Chicago, University of Hawaii, DePaul University, Wichita State University, and Mills College in Oakland, California. From 2019 to 2022, she also worked as a writer/editor for Netflix on the bilingual team in the Product Writing department.

Obejas practices activism through writing, by telling her own story about her identity, as well as the stories of others. The anthology Immigrant Voices: 21st Century Stories, written in collaboration with Megan Bayles, is a collection of stories that seeks to describe the experience of people who have emigrated to America. While most anthologies focus on one group, this anthology expands the perspective to multiple group identities.

== Personal life ==
Obejas was born June 28, 1956, in Havana, Cuba. After emigrating to the United States at the age of six, she lived in Michigan City, Indiana, and attended Indiana University from 1977 to 1979, when she moved to Chicago.

=== Nationality ===
At the age of 39, Obejas revisited Cuba. Reflections on her home country are dispersed throughout her work, such as in the story collection We Came All the Way from Cuba So You Could Dress Like This? Although she has lived in the Midwest since childhood, Obejas says her Cuban origins continue to be a defining detail in her life. In an interview with Gregg Shapiro, Obejas discussed the peculiar duality of growing up in the U.S. but not truly identifying as an American:

I was born in Havana and that single event has pretty much defined the rest of my life. In the U.S., I'm Cuban, Cuban-American, Latina by virtue of being Cuban, a Cuban journalist, a Cuban writer, somebody's Cuban lover, a Cuban dyke, a Cuban girl on a bus, a Cuban exploring Sephardic roots, always and endlessly Cuban. I'm more Cuban here than I am in Cuba, by sheer contrast and repetition.

=== Sexuality ===
Obejas is a lesbian and frequently references sexuality in her writing. Although she often writes about her characters' struggles with sexuality and family acceptance, in an interview with Chicago LGBT newspaper Windy City Times, she said she did not experience significant family problems because of her sexuality:

Remember, Cuba was known as the brothel of the Caribbean prior to the revolution. People went to Cuba to do the things they couldn't do in their home countries, but were free to do there. So Cubans have a sort of thick skin to most sexual stuff, which is not to say that my parents did, but as a general rule in the environment and the culture, there's a lot more possibility. I never had any sense of shame or anything like that.

On a personal level, Obejas says she always accepted her sexual identity as part of herself:

In terms of my own sexuality, I don't know what it was, but I just never blinked. I was always amazed when other people did; I was always sort of flabbergasted when people would suffer angst about it. I understood that it was taboo and all of that, but I chalked it up as a kind of a generational problem.

== Career ==
Obejas earned an M.F.A from Warren Wilson College in 1993. She was the Springer Lecturer in Creative Writing (2003–2005) at the University of Chicago, as well as an advisor for the online prose magazine Otium. In fall of 2005, she served as the Distinguished Writer in Residence at the University of Hawaiʻi. She was the Sor Juana visiting writer at DePaul University from 2006 to 2012. From 2013 to 2019, she served as the Distinguished Visiting Writer at Mills College, where she founded a Low-Residency MFA in Translation Program.

In 2008, she translated Junot Díaz's Pulitzer Prize-winning novel, The Brief and Wondrous Life of Oscar Wao, into Spanish. The Dominican-American author's novel addresses many themes, including young adult sexuality and national identity, also present in Obejas' work. She has also translated work by Rita Indiana, Wendy Guerra, Adam Mansbach, Carlos Velazquez, F.G. Haghenbeck, and many others. She works in and out of both English and Spanish.

Obejas has written the novels Ruins, Memory Mambo and Days of Awe, and the story collection We Came All the Way from Cuba So You Could Dress Like This? as well as the poetry chapbook This is What Happened in Our Other Life. A collection of short stories, The Tower of Antilles & Other Stories, was published by Akashic in 2017.

In 2021, she released Boomerang/Bumerán through Beacon Press, a bilingual collection of poetry written in English and Spanish that uses mostly gender-free language and addresses immigration, displacement, love and activism.

In a reflection on Obejas' work, Latina comedian Lisa Alvarado says of the writer, "Her work exudes a keen sense of humor, of irony, of compassion and is laced with the infinite small moments that make her poetry and her novels sing with the breath of real life."

=== Journalism ===
Throughout her career, Obejas has worked for many different publications, including the Chicago Tribune, Windy City Times, The Advocate, Out, Vanity Fair, Playboy, Ms., The Village Voice, The Washington Post, and The New York Times. She was a staff writer for the Chicago Tribune and contributed to the Village Voice and other publications.

As a Chicago Tribune columnist for nearly ten years, Obejas penned the nightlife column "After Hours". The column started when then-Friday section editor Kevin Moore asked the self-described insomniac if she would like to cover nighttime entertainment for the paper. In 2001, Obejas announced that she would no longer write the column.

In 2021, she released the widely praised Boomerang/Bumerán through Beacon Press, a collection of poetry in English and Spanish using non-gendered language.

== Works ==
=== Novels ===
- Memory Mambo (1996)
- Days of Awe (2001)
- Ruins (2009)

=== Collections ===
- We Came All the Way from Cuba So You Could Dress Like This? (1994) (stories)
- This Is What Happened In Our Other Life (2007) (poems)
- The Tower of the Antilles (2017) (stories)
- The Boy Kingdom / El Reino de los Varones

=== Other ===
- Havana Noir (2007) (translator and editor)
- La Breve y Maravillosa Vida de Oscar Wao (2008) (translator)
- Immigrant Voices: 21st Century Stories (2014) (co-editor with Megan Bayles)
- Papi by Rita Indiana (2016) (translator)
- Boomerang / Bumerán (poetry) (2021)

== Awards ==
Obejas has received a Pulitzer Prize for her work in a Chicago Tribune team investigation, the Studs Terkel Journalism Prize, several Peter Lisagor journalism honors, and two Lambda Literary awards.

She has also been a National Endowment for the Arts fellow in poetry and served residencies at Yaddo, Ragdale and McDowell, among others.

In 2010, she was inducted into the Chicago Gay and Lesbian Hall of Fame.

In 2014, she was awarded a USA Ford Fellowship for literature and translation.

== See also ==
- List of Cuban American writers
- List of LGBT writers
