= Jasmyne Cannick =

American journalist (born 1977)

Jasmyne A. Cannick
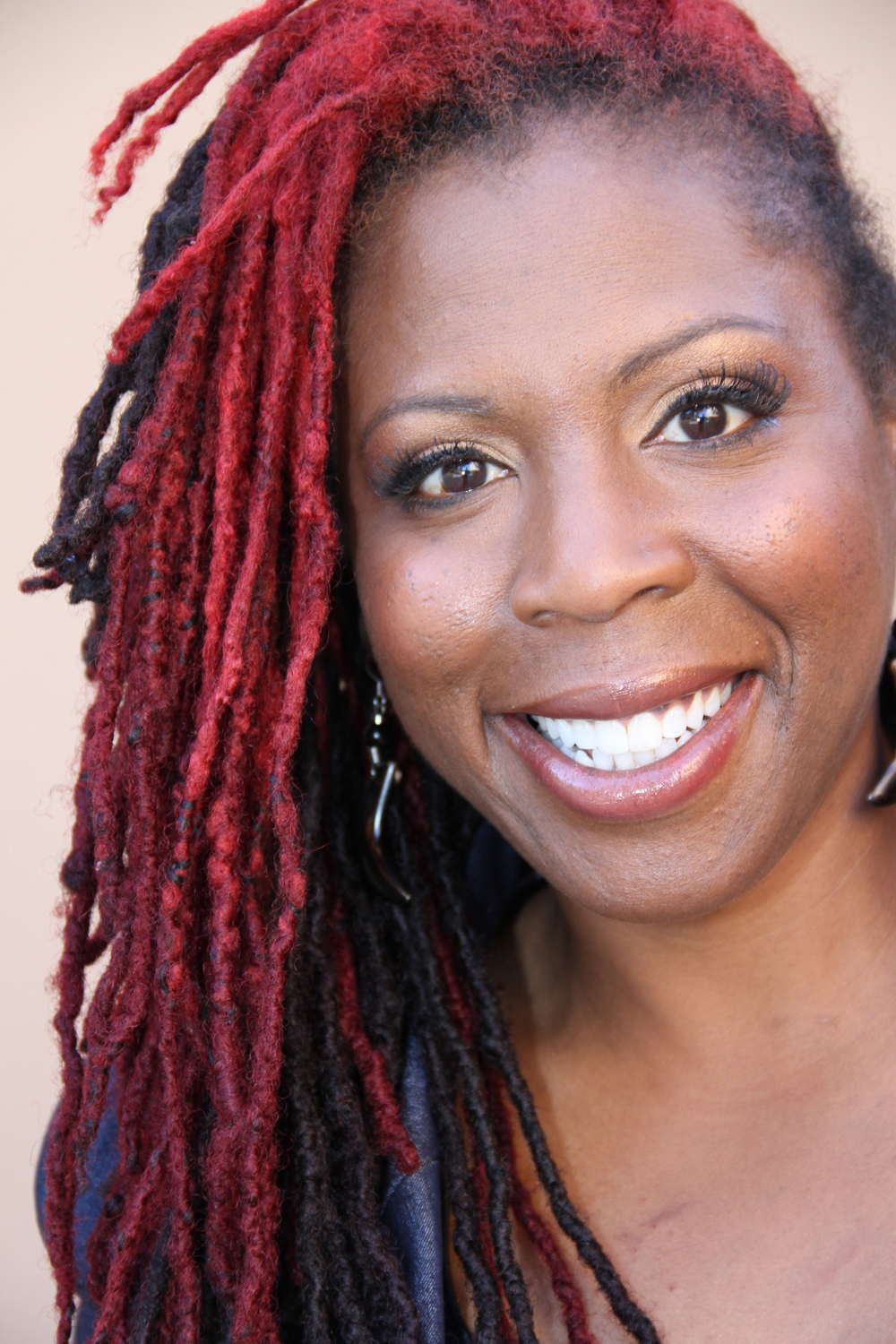
- Born: October 23, 1977 (age 48); Culver City, California, US
- Occupations: Political strategist, communications strategist, journalist
- Office: Los Angeles County Democratic Central Committee, 53rd Assembly District
- Term: 2020-2024
- Political party: Democratic
- Website: iamjasmyne.com

Jasmyne Ariel Cannick (born October 22, 1977) is an American politician, journalist, and pop culture, race issues and politics commentator. She is also known for her work as an advocate for underrepresented and marginalized communities. She was selected as one of ESSENCE Magazine's 25 Women Shaping the World, KCET's Southern California Seven Women of Vision, one of Los Angeles' Most Fascinating Angelenos by the L.A. Weekly and as one of the Out100 in 2019.

== Early life ==
Cannick initially grew up in Hermosa Beach, California. When her parents divorced she split her time between Hermosa Beach, California and Compton, California. From the age of 13 through 17 she was in foster care. She emancipated from the Department of Children and Family Services when she was 17.

== Politics ==
Cannick has worked at all three levels of government including in the California State Assembly Mervyn M. Dymally as a press secretary before reprising that role in the House of Representatives for Congresswoman Laura Richardson. In Los Angeles County, she has worked for several city and county governments including five mayors and the president of the Los Angeles City Council.

She is a former co-chair of the National Stonewall Democrats Black Caucus. She currently sits on the board of the Los Angeles African American Women's Political Action Committee and the Black Alliance for Justice Immigration (BAJI) Political Action Committee.

=== Los Angeles County Democratic Party Delegate ===
In 2020, Cannick decided to run for Los Angeles County Democratic Party's County Central Committee (LACDP) after she became disillusioned with the Democratic Party's silence on Democratic major donor Ed Buck. Instead of exiting the Party, she successfully won a seat on the LACDP's Central Committee representing the 53rd Assembly District where she can now hold the Democratic Party, that she says gets the majority of Black's votes, more accountable as a voting member. She is the first black person to ever be elected to this office from the 53rd Assembly District which includes downtown Los Angeles, Boyle Heights, Koreatown, Hancock Park, and West Adams.

== Journalism ==
Cannick has been active in journalism since 2004. In 2006, Cannick wrote an essay titled "Gays First, Then Illegals", in which she argued that the LGBT community should be given the right to marry prior to any discussion of granting citizenship and other rights to non-US citizens. The essay was deemed xenophobic by many, and prompted an article signed by 55 activists in response. She was named Journalist of the Year by Out Magazine in 2019.

=== Covering Ed Buck ===
Cannick started tracking Democratic donor Ed Buck in 2017 after the crystal meth overdose death of 26-year-old Gemmel Moore at Ed Buck's West Hollywood apartment. Originally asked to help Moore's mother by L.A. Weekly writer Dennis Romero, Cannick went on to start reporting on what she said was Moore's death was immediately classified as an accidental methamphetamine overdose by the coroner. Nineteen days later after Moore's journal was publicly published by Cannick and appeared in news reports, the Los Angeles County Sheriff's Department's homicide bureau opened an investigation.

=== Covering the Los Angeles Police Department ===
Through her blog and media appearances Cannick has been highly critical of the Los Angeles Police Department and its Chief Charlie Beck. She raised questions about LAPD's purchase of a $6,000 quarterhorse from Chief Charlie Beck's daughter, an LAPD officer, and about Beck's alleged soft treatment of a sergeant who reportedly was dating her.

Cannick broke news LAPD Det. Frank Lyga had been recorded telling a class of fellow law enforcement officers that when he looked back at his 1997 shooting of black cop Kevin Gaines, "I could have killed a whole truckload of them... and would have been happily doing it."

Cannick broke the story of how a former "shot caller" for the Mexican Mafia was the featured speaker at a book signing event in downtown Los Angeles that was arranged by the LAPD with taxpayer dollars for a private group of prominent business leaders and local law enforcement officials.

As of 2017, several officers and a commander are suing the City of Los Angeles after being accused by the department's administration of being her source.

While Cannick is critical of Los Angeles Police Chief Charlie Beck and his leadership team, she is less critical of the rank-and-file whom she says are often only following the bad orders of their command staff. She is known for starting all of her blog posts regarding the LAPD with:

We're not against the police. We're not against the police department, but we are against police who commit misconduct (and those who help cover it up).

The L.A. Weekly named her the LAPD's Critic-in-Chief.

== Advocacy ==
Cannick is the co-founder along with Gemmel Moore's Mom LaTisha Nixon of Justice 4 Gemmel and All of Ed Buck's Victims. She is the co-founder of My Hood Votes along with rapper Lil Eazy-E, a voter registration initiative focused on Los Angeles County's roughest neighborhoods. Cannick is a co-founder of the National Black Justice Coalition, the nation's largest and oldest Black lesbian, gay, bisexual, and transgender civil rights organization. She currently sits on the board of the Los Angeles African American Women's Political Action Committee and the Black Alliance for Justice Immigration (BAJI) Political Action Committee.

Cannick has been a voice and an advocate for many causes. She led a campaign to retire white gay comedian Charles Knipp's character Shirley Q. Liquor, a self-described inarticulate black woman on welfare with 19 kids. In 2005, she advocated to help make sure that the Los Angeles City taxpayers did not foot the bill to honor a homophobic black pastor. That same year, she helped lead a protest against the "Tookie Must Die Hour" on KFI-AM with talk-show hosts John Kobylt and Ken Chiampou. Stanley "Tookie" Williams was the founder of the Crips gang and scheduled to be executed after being convicted in the 1979 killings of four people. Cannick also was the last person to interview Williams before his execution. She would go on to face off against KFI-AM again after talk-show hosts Kobylt and Chiampou made fun of Whitney Houston after she was found dead in a bathtub at the Beverly Hilton calling her a "crack ho." Several years later Cannick criticized oKFI-AM morning show host Bill Handel for calling Florida Congresswoman Frederica Wilson a "cheap sleazy Democrat whore" on air.

Cannick has been an advocate of the black LGBTQ community, which she belongs to. When Proposition 8, a measure that made same-sex marriage illegal in California was on the ballot, she was one of the leading voices in the black and LGBTQ communities calling out African-Americans for their homophobia and the white-led LGBTQ community for their racism against blacks. She is known for her column "A White Gay’s Guide on Dealing with the Black Community for Dummies" where she would break down the pervasive and systemic racism in the white gay community towards black people.

When Mitrice Richardson went missing after being released from a Los Angeles County jail in Malibu, Cannick worked with Richardson's family to call attention to the case and to challenge the Sheriff's Department on the narrative they were spinning in the media.

In 2018, she won a major victory on behalf of a dozen tenants in South Los Angeles facing homelessness after a transitional housing manager took their money, failed to pay rent, and abandoned the property. Through her advocacy for the victims, she was able to get them relocation assistance as well as call attention to a new practice taking place in Los Angeles where low-income renters are being taken advantage of with rent-a-room scams.

== Film and television ==
She was a producer on the pilot for Noah's Arc, a cable television dramedy about four black gay male friends living in Los Angeles which lasted two seasons. She is a co-producer of the award-winning documentary 41st & Central: The Untold Story of the Southern California Chapter of the Black Panther Party.

She is currently writing several scripts for film projects.

== Personal life ==
Cannick is an out lesbian. She lives in Los Angeles. Through African Ancestry, Inc., Cannick traced her maternal lineage to the Bubi people in Bioko Island and the Tikar, Hausa, and Fulani peoples of Cameroon.
