= Chuck Knipp =

Canadian comedian (born 1961)

F. Charles "Chuck" Knipp
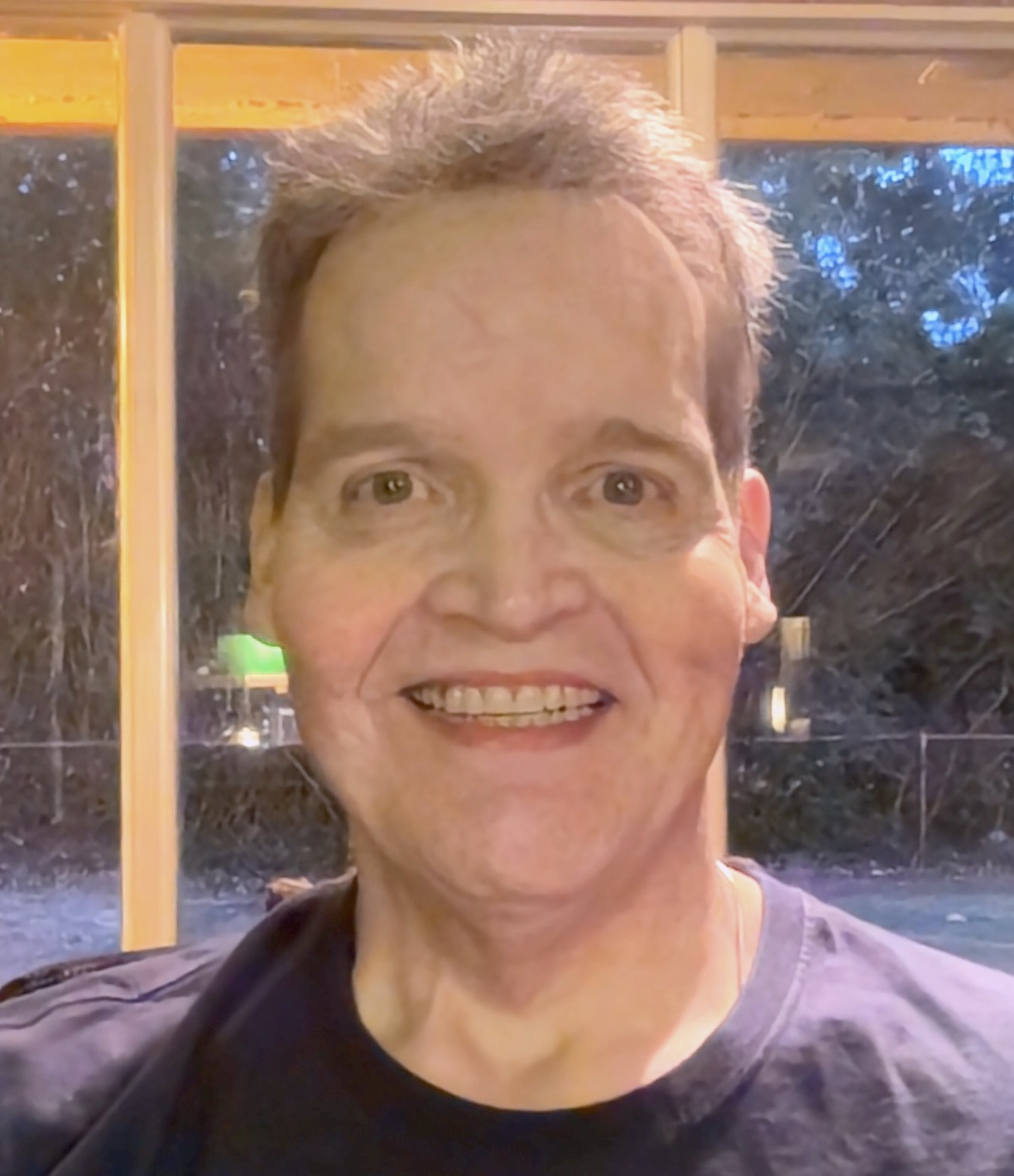
- Chuck Knipp
- Born: 1961 (age 64–65); Saskatoon, Saskatchewan, Canada
- Occupations: Actor; comedian; registered nurse

Chuck Knipp (born 1961) is a Canadian comedian and registered nurse/paramedic best known for his vocal characters, performed on radio and in live 'stand-up comedy' acts. His best known character is Shirley Q. Liquor. Knipp also performed as spirituality seeker Betty Butterfield. Knipp's performance of the Liquor character were controversial, and garnered protests.

Knipp is known for his radio advertisements in Southeast Texas. He retired from live performances in 2010 and now is a volunteer registered nurse with the American Red Cross.

He is a member of the Quaker Universalist Fellowship, and a follower of many Anglican and Catholic movements.

== Reactions to Knipp's characters ==
=== Criticism ===
There have been a number of articles in the media that have taken issue with Knipp's performance of Shirley Q. Liquor–a white comedian voicing a Black female character.

To Knipp's declaration that Liquor "was created in celebration of, not to downgrade, black women", Jasmyne Cannick countered, "...it is not possible for Charles Knipp, a white man, to help heal years of mistreatment and racism at the hands of his people by putting on a wig, speaking Ebonics, and in blackface...There is nothing remotely uplifting about Knipp's act and I wish people would stop defending his character with the tired argument that he's trying to heal the nation. The only thing Knipp is trying to heal is the hole in his pocket by filling it with all of the money he makes off of degrading Black people."

Knipp was profiled in a Rolling Stone article and dubbed "The Most Dangerous Comedian in America."

=== Support ===
Entertainer RuPaul has long been a fan and supporter of Knipp. "Critics who think that Shirley Q. Liquor is offensive are idiots. Listen, I've been discriminated against by everybody in the world: gay people, black people, whatever. I know discrimination, I know racism, I know it very intimately. She's not racist, and if she were, she wouldn't be on my new CD." In his blog, RuPaul adds: "I am very sensitive to issues of racism, sexism and discrimination. I am a gay black man, who started my career as a professional transvestite in Georgia, twenty years ago."

The Boston Phoenix journalist Dan Kennedy awarded Boston government official Jerome Smith the dubious Muzzle Award for his part in the cancellation of Knipp's scheduled performance in Boston in 2004.

The writer David Holthouse, the anti-racist investigator for the Southern Poverty Law Center's Intelligence Report, stated that "Knipp is in no way a white supremacist" and that Knipp "invites the audience to sympathize with a single Black mother". An in-depth article was printed in the June, 2007, edition of Rolling Stone magazine.

The New York Blade criticized GLAAD for condemning Knipp, stating, "We commend GLAAD for condemning racism, but we question whether the organization's goal is best attained by joining this particular fight."

John Strausbaugh, the author of Blackface, Whiteface, Insult & Imitation in American Popular Culture, explores Liquor's act in his book.

Syndicated radio host Michael Berry, a native of Orange, Texas, plays frequent clips and often live phone interviews with Knipp's characters.

Louisville, KY radio and television personality Terry Meiners, a long time presence on the local airwaves, frequently features clips and recorded skits with Shirley Q. Liquor as she visits some of our local businesses with Terry's own character "Trouble Man" on iHeartRadio's local radio station WHAS AM.
