= Stereotypes of Asians =

Stereotypes of Asians may refer to:

- Stereotypes of Asian Americans
  - Stereotypes of East Asians in the United States, ethnic stereotypes of East Asians found in American society as well as other Western societies
    - Stereotypes of Chinese Americans
  - Stereotypes of Arabs and Muslims in the United States
- Stereotypes of South Asians, oversimplified ethnic stereotypes of South Asian people in Western societies
- Stereotypes of Southeast Asians
- Stereotypes of Japanese people
