= Homophobia in ethnic minority communities =

Homophobia in ethnic minority communities is any negative prejudice or form of discrimination in ethnic minority communities worldwide towards people who identify as–or are perceived as being–lesbian, gay, bisexual or transgender (LGBT), known as homophobia. This may be expressed as antipathy, contempt, prejudice, aversion, hatred, irrational fear, and is sometimes related to religious beliefs.Though many religious beliefs are used to overcome homophobia as well. A 2006 study by the Joseph Rowntree Foundation in the UK found that while religion can have a positive function in many LGBT Black and Minority Ethnic (BME) communities, it can also play a role in supporting homophobia.

Many LGBT ethnic minority persons rely on members of their ethnic group for support on racial matters. Within these communities, homophobia and transphobia often exist within the context of ethnocultural norms on gender and sexual orientation. Caitlin Ryan of the National Youth Advocacy Coalition wrote; "a common fallacy within communities of color is that gay men or lesbians are perceived as 'defective' men or women who want to be a member of the opposite gender".

In some cultures, there are difficulties in categorising homosexuality. Some scholars have argued that Western notions of sexual identity began to emerge in Europe in the mid-to-late 19th century, though others challenge this. Behaviors that would be widely regarded as homosexual in the West were regarded as acceptable in around three quarters of the cultures surveyed in Patterns of Sexual Behavior (1951).

== Theory ==
=== Intersectionality and dual minority identity ===
Kimberlé Crenshaw developed the framework for intersectionality; the theory that black women are not wholly defined by a singular identity, which is used in the process of examining the ways in which sexuality and race are related. Considering the ways in which identities interact with each other and create specific experiences related to multiple intersecting identities is a better way of examining individuals and the discrimination they may deal with.

Crenshaw's work also draws upon W. E. B. Du Bois' work, which refers to the fragmented understanding of self that comes with being a black American. It is applicable to the understanding of LGB members in racial and ethnic minority groups. Their multiple identities cause a fragmentation in which they routinely observe themselves, as both queer individuals and racial and ethnic minorities, through the lens of American culture. Du Bois called this concept double consciousness.

Homophobia in ethnic minority communities creates a double bind for LGBT ethnic minorities. Members of these groups experience racial and ethnic discrimination from wider society in addition to homophobia within their ethnic/racial groups. This intersection of multiple forms of discrimination creates a triple threat for LGBT people of color. The first domain of discrimination is racism within LGBT communities which can make it hard for people who belong to an ethnic minority group to identify with the LGBT community and feel like the community is a safe space. This discrimination manifests as discrimination in social areas like bars and organizations where people of color are oftentimes excluded from the space physically and socially, and overall less likely to be welcomed.

The second domain is heterosexism within ethnic communities, which is the main focus of this article. However, heterosexism within ethnic communities cannot be treated as a completely separate issue from the other forms of discrimination as many of the forms of discrimination overlap.

The third form of discrimination is racism in close, same-sex relationships in which gay men of color are less-sought-out; solicitations for sex discriminate against race with phrases like "no rice" (referring to no East Asian men), "no curry" (which means no South Asian men), or "no chocolate" (which signifies no black men). Race-based sexual stereotypes are often used within the LGBT community, which impacts potential partner choices for ethnic minority LGBT people. Black and Latino gay men are usually considered aggressive and passionate, and Asian gay men are believed to be feminine, mechanical, and reserved. These preferences are exacerbated by Internet dating sites and apps, where gay men can tailor their partner's bodily preferences according to their tastes.

=== Effects on health ===
Heterosexism in ethnic minority communities is especially harmful to the mental health of LGBT people of color, who consider their ethnic communities to be a stronger support network than LGBT communities due to racism in the latter. Abandonment by racial community that has provided support throughout childhood in dealing with external racism is feared. Due to the racial community's importance for LGBT people of color, discrimination within their own communities negatively effects mental health. If people are more dependent on their ethnic communities, they may favor their racial identity over their sexual identity. Heterosexism is thus a stressor because of the understanding of external racial oppression as well as internalized homophobia and self-hatred. Homophobia within ethnic minority communities is caused by the unique cultural practices of each ethnic minority and by the broader issue of Western, non-white discrimination.

This discrimination creates the need for a supportive community to undo the psychological damage it causes. Non-heterosexual people of color often find that neither racial community nor sexual orientation community can cater to their psychological needs since the racial community can sometimes be homophobic and the LGBT community can sometimes be racist. Minority groups find solace in support networks among themselves but clinical spaces continue to be inaccessible to LGBT-POC. When minority people experience invalidations of their experience, it becomes difficult to find necessary health services for LGBT-POC. Within the clinic, a white psychiatrist may not understand the social needs of a person of color, and spaces for dual-minority identity development are relatively lacking. Micro-aggressions within the clinic are detrimental for mental health and prevention requires additional effort from practicing counselors to be stripped of bias, informed of unique issues, and further support networks.

=== Effects on coming out ===
Heterosexism in ethnic minority communities can account for delays in the process of coming out between dominant cultures, mostly white LGBT people and LGBT people of color. LGBT people of color, on average, come out to their families and communities later than white LGBT people. White LGBT youth will generally find it easier to come out to their families because there is a broader range of social acceptability. Since white LGBT youth can typically better identify with white-dominated LGBT communities, they can find an additional safe community outside of their biological family and face no fear of external societal racism.

Young LGBT-POC feel the additional stigma from their own community combined with the stigma white LGBT youth face, and risking alienation from family and community means losing an important support network for POC due to the cultural oppression of racial minorities. As ethnic minorities in a mostly Western context, however, ethnic communities can sometimes be strong enough to provide some form of solace for individuals who identify as LGBT. If the oppression of the ethnic minority group is stronger in general society, homophobia from within may be more bearable than losing access to a racial community. Some other research has found heterosexism and levels of internalized homophobia are similar for both white and POC LGBT people.

== United States ==
Attitudes towards sexual orientation vary throughout the United States. Social and cultural mores of sexuality have a large sociological impact on individual behavior, especially in the family unit. Many ethnic minority families in the United States do not feel comfortable discussing sexuality and disclosure of one's sexual orientation or identity often presents challenges. Many feel their coming-out may force them to be loyal to one community rather than another. In the United States, 44% of LGBT students persons of color have reported experiencing bullying based on their sexual orientation and/or race; 13% reported physical harassment and 7% reported physical assault for the same reasons.

=== Black community ===
The percentage of Black Americans who believe that homosexuality should be accepted lags behind other ethnic groups. In 2017, 63% of Black respondents polled said it should be accepted, versus the national average of 70%. Researchers have identified a range of potential explanations for this trend, including the association of the African American community with the church in the United States, gender norms within the Black community, and the idea that homosexuality is antithetical to being black. Despite a majority share of support for the LGBTQ community, 60% of respondents in one study felt that LGBTQ advances had come at the expense of Black civil rights.

However, the notion that homophobia is more prevalent in the African American community has been exaggerated in public perception. Data from the Pew Research Center has suggested that black people were only ever marginally more likely to be homophobic than white people, and black support for LGBTQ rights has increased between each consecutive Pew Research poll, including among religious Black Protestants. Lauron Kehrer points out that exit polls that exaggerated black opposition to gay marriage in California were later proven to be inaccurate. Research indicates that gay black people perceive the Black and White populations as equally homophobic.

Black Americans are about as likely as other ethnic groups to identify as LGBTQ. This contradicts stereotypes that African-Americans and other minorities are less likely to identify as LGBT. In recent years, African American celebrities such as Jason Collins, Michael Sam, and Robin Roberts have come out.

Research suggests that African-Americans have complex views on gay civil rights. While African-Americans are more likely than white people to support laws that protect LGBT people from employment discrimination, they are less likely to support gay adoption rights. While as a group, African-Americans are less likely to support gay marriage than white Americans, this trend is reversed when age and religious identification are controlled for. Research suggests that the higher Black affiliation with certain Protestant and Catholic denominations plays a role in black views on gay marriage. Age also appears to play a significant role in African American views on gay rights, as there is a large generation gap between the views of older black Americans and black youth. All of these data challenge the idea that blacks are uniquely homophobic.

African American LGBT people tend to identify more with their racial/ethnic category rather than their sexual orientation as a main identity reference group. Black LGBT people are often hesitant about revealing their sexuality to their friends and families because of homosexuality's incompatibility with cultural gender roles. Thus, when black people—especially black lesbians—come out, family and community loyalty can provide a safety net to prevent social alienation. This familial safety net of acceptance is not full tolerance; for black lesbians, the community of "girlfriends" may grant acceptance providing there is a tacit silence about the LGBT woman's sexuality.

Black people are likelier to express homophobic attitudes, but there is a link between education, religion, and homophobic attitudes. Education has an impact on homophobic attitudes and views of sexuality within the black community. This follows a nationwide trend; more educated people are likely to be more accepting of non-heterosexual sexuality. Better education typically means less affiliation to conservative religions or denominations, which limits the influence of socially conservative ideas. Barack Obama acknowledged homophobia within the African American community and said; "If we are honest with ourselves, we'll acknowledge that our own community has not always been true to Martin Luther King's vision of a beloved community ... We have scorned our gay brothers and sisters instead of embracing them".

The perceived bias against homosexuality in the African American community has led to the sub-cultural phenomenon "on the down-low", in which black men who identify as heterosexual secretly have sex with men. The term is also used to refer to a sexual identity.

LGBT African Americans often face homophobia from heterosexual African Americans and conflict with LGBT Whites due to racism within LGBT culture. According to Margaret L. Anderson and Patricia Hill Collins, "The linkage between race, class, and gender is revealed within studies of sexuality, just as sexuality is a dimension of each. For example, constructing images about Black sexuality is central to maintaining institutional racism." Celebrations of U.S. African-American LGBT identity include black gay pride celebrations in black-majority urban areas. Other endeavors support African-American representation in LGBT media, such as the short-lived television series Noah's Arc.

==== Homophobia and the Black Church ====
The Black Church is a central part of mainstream African American culture. Rather than a specific denomination, the Black Church refers to a combination of Protestant Christian denominations, including the African Methodist Episcopal Church (AME), the African Methodist Episcopal Zion Church, the National Baptist Convention, and the Church of God in Christ.

This link between the church and black culture was formed during slavery; the church provided spiritual support for slaves. Religiosity helped keep slaves' morale high. When they began to plan their escape from the plantations, codes conveying secret messages about their plans were embedded into worship songs.

This history of the Black Church and slaves has created an indelible bond between African Americans and the church. The values preached in the Black Church tend to be socially conservative, with the exclusion of ways the church addresses homelessness. In the home, so-called “traditional” family values prevail. Maintaining a nuclear family with a man as the main provider and a woman as the staple of the house are the dominant values within the Black Church. Heterosexuality is seen as the only acceptable standard while homosexuality is seen as condemnable by God.

==== Hip-hop ====
Hip hop has long been one of the least LGBTQ-friendly genres of music, with a significant body of the genre containing homophobic views and anti-gay lyrics. Attitudes towards homosexuality in hip hop culture have historically been negative. Gay slurs and language denoting discomfort with homosexuality, such as "sus", "no homo", and "pause" can be heard in hip hop lyrics from the industry's biggest stars.

==== Homophobia and Historically Black Colleges and Universities ====
Historically black colleges and universities (HBCUs) are another hotbed of Black culture. HBCUs were built during the Jim Crow era to serve African Americans in segregated areas at a time when Black students were not allowed to attend white institutions.

On the campus of HBCUs, many Black students find a sense of support and belonging among faculty, staff, and students who may come from similar backgrounds. However, some LGBTQ students come against a barrier and feel supported in their racial but not their sexual identity, or feel a pressure to be "Black first, gay second." As of 2017, fewer than 25% of HBCUs had any LGBTQ student organizations, compared with 62% of colleges nationwide. Some campuses have begun to make a conscious effort create a more supportive environment, but progress has been slow, and some LGBTQ students report that there is much greater acceptance for lesbian and bisexual women than for gay and bisexual men.

Despite the push for a more inclusive environment, there is reluctance to update the image of scholarly Black men and women on their campuses. In 2009, on the campus of the famed all-male Morehouse College, a new dress code policy was enacted that explicitly barred students from wearing women's clothing to any sponsored University events. This was a direct response to feminine-presenting students at the college. The stated purpose of the dress code policy was to promote the vision of a “Morehouse Man” which is a “leader on campus and within the community.” This incident came 6-years after a gay-bashing incident on the Morehouse campus in which a student beat a classmate, who he mistakenly believed had made a sexual advance toward him, with a baseball bat. In more recent years, the college has made changes to support its LGBTQ+ students, including establishing a task force, founding an LGBTQ student organization, and accepting transgender men as students.

The first LGBTQ student organization at an HBCU, Lambda Student Alliance at Howard University, was established in 1979. Bowie State University founded the first LGBTQ student center in 2012. Morgan State University is the first of few HBCUs to implement gender-neutral bathrooms and plans to implement a living-learning community in the future dedicated to creating gender-neutral spaces. Morehouse has become a leader in expanding the idea of what a Black man looks like.

==== Homophobia and AIDS in the black community ====
Homophobic attitudes within the Black community may be a contributing factor in the disproportionately high incidence of HIV/AIDS among African Americans. Many still perceive HIV/AIDS as a "gay" disease affecting primarily white men. This view is an obstacle to treatment for some; individuals who perceive that they are not at risk for HIV may be less likely to test or use protection, allowing the disease to spread without detection.

There is a direct link between homophobia and high-risk behavior that can lead to HIV/AIDS. Studies of Black men who have sex with men (MSM) have found that experiencing homophobic events or encountering stigma were linked with higher-risk sexual behavior, including unprotected anal intercourse, as well as reluctance to obtain HIV testing or care, lower adherence to treatment medication, and reduced disclosure of a HIV-positive status to sexual partners. Many Black MSM report facing homophobia or serophobia in spaces where they are supported against racism, and racism or serophobia in gay spaces. Some MSM also report that desire to use a condom was perceived to imply HIV-positive status, and that therefore men avoid using or discussing condom use due to stigma.

=== Latino community ===
The Latino community in the United States is largely accepting of LGBT people, with a large majority supporting gay marriage according to some polls. There is evidence that Latinos in America are significantly more likely to identify as LGBT than the general population. Latinos adults are twice as likely as white or black Americans to identify as LGBT, and nearly 22% of Latino youth identify as LGBT, making them by far the most likely group in America to claim an LGBT identity. As both ethnic and sexual minorities, queer Latinos may navigate contradictory identities, which Gloria Anzaldúa calls "mestiza consciousness". "Borderland" spaces composed strictly of queer Latinos, allow them to express their sexuality without consequences. One such space was magazine Esto no tiene nombre's community for Latina lesbians.

Family gender roles in Hispanic/Latino culture are sometimes considered to be defined by clear brightlines. Oftentimes, Fathers and husbands hold power over the women in their lives; same-sex relationships disrupt the traditional role. This overt silence about sexuality may be nuanced; family identity and community are important to Hispanic/Latino families, which sometimes offer a support network despite the LGBT child's disobedience against the nuclear family. Because Latino/an LGBT people experience greater racial discrimination in broader society, primary support can come from families where they are stigmatized yet still accepted.

Gay Latinos report ostracism from their friends and peers, who tell them they are "not truly 'men'." Community attitudes treat male homosexuality as "dirty, shameful and abnormal", and Latina lesbians are stereotyped as traitors who have forsaken their roots. Cherríe Moraga said Chicana lesbians are perceived as Malinche figures who are corrupted by foreign influences that contribute to the "genocide" of their people, even if they have children. These stigmas are historically ingrained into Latino cultures; Latina lesbians who have spoken to their families about their sexuality still feel they are silenced.

A Green Heritage News editor stated homophobia in the Latino community is tied to a value system that finds it difficult to accept overt sexuality. It is also a part of rigid gender roles and machismo. This has influenced many people with HIV/AIDS to avoid being tested for the disease in the Hispanic community. Covert homophobia in the use of terms such as that's so gay and no homo are also common. Toronto Blue Jays shortstop Yunel Escabar was banned from playing after writing the phrase tu eres maricón on his eye tape (Spanish for "you are a faggot"). Hector Conteras, a DJ, "prompted listeners via Twitter to denounce what they considered 'gay behavior' from their peers at work, school, their neighborhood or within their own family".

In the U.S., Latino/a children who identify as LGBTQ face scrutiny from their community at home and in schools, especially within a high school or college preparation experience. While facing scrutiny from family and community to maintain gender normality to prosper in the U.S., they also face scrutiny from their peers, mentors and educational administrators. This scrutiny includes a lack of acceptance and recognition as a separate educational entity within sexual education programs provided by many high school education districts. Latinas are viewed as needing to have less interest in sexual education while Latinos are told to maintain focus and to take the education seriously. When teachers are prompted to explain sexual education for lesbians or gays, the teachers or educators assume the student body to be uniformly heterosexual and refuse or consider the questions immature and outside the scope of their teaching.

LGBT discrimination has a negative impact on the mental health of Latino/as; LGBT Latinas, however, experience less homophobia than their male contemporaries. This can be attributed to socialization that condemns same-sex male relationships more harshly than same-sex female relationships. Men experience more internalized homophobia than Latina women, which impacts their well-being.

For Latino/as, creating environments that enable LGBT individuals to be themselves without fear of judgement is necessary for overall health. Implementing programs that empower LGBT Latinos is an effective measure in the prevention of HIV. Self-identification also needs to be observed; if a person identifies strongly as both queer and Latino, that impacts their overall feeling of well-being. Strong self-identification with marginalized groups can contribute to internalized homophobia.

=== Asian American and Pacific Islander community ===
Homophobia in the Asian American community is an ongoing issue. One study found approximately 90% of Asian and Pacific Islanders (APIs) who self-identified as LGBT thought homophobia or transphobia is an issue in the API community. Homosexuality is sometimes considered a mental disorder in many Asian countries of origin; shock therapy, public shaming, or other denigrating methods are sometimes used in an attempt to rid someone of homosexuality.

According to Amy Sueyoshi, "Voices from the queer left, though opposed to homophobia in cultural nationalism, have picked up the protest against the feminization of Asian American men in the gay community". While having different perspectives, both groups support a phallocentric standard of Asian American male sexuality."

==== Cultural expectations ====
Homophobia in the Asian American/Pacific Islander community can be prevalent due to cultural expectations that some members of the community hold. These cultural expectations are not universal or uniform, but may help explain why some LGBT Asian Americans feel homophobic pressure from their ethnic communities.

Some Asian Americans and first-generation Asian immigrants consider homosexuality to be Western in nature, especially since the concept of "gay identity" is a term coined in the Western world. A large percentage of Asian languages do not have a specific word describing homosexuality, gay, lesbian, etc., but rather several stand-in terms that roughly reference one's sexuality. Due to lacking specific terminology for certain concepts, there often is little to no frame of reference for understanding the dynamic of same-sex sexual relationships. The attempted explanation of gay identity to one's community creates a language barrier between the community and the LGBT member where the LGBT person has difficulty explaining their sexual orientation to their family and community members, exacerbating the lack of understanding and cultural rift between supposedly Western conceptions of homosexuality and heterosexism.

Homosexuality is considered to not be associated with Asian cultures, especially in Japanese culture which operate with limited gender roles. However, it was romanticized in Chinese culture, embraced by the people so long, until the establishment of the PRC which demolished such bondage. Thus, when LGBT Asian American children try to explain their gay identity to their parents, it often can be unsuccessful since there is no equivalent concept in Asian culture. Even in Western understandings, Asian American LGBT people find little to no representation. Coming out and continual assertion of gay identity is viewed as a rejection of fundamental Asian cultural values; due to the belief that homosexuality is a Western concept, LGBT children become sources of familial shame for Asian American and Asian immigrant mothers.

Verbal openness and communication in Asian American families is often considered to be restrained in comparison to white families. Non-verbal cues and indirect high-context communication are valued by Asian American families. As a part of acculturating to Western society, second-generation Asian Americans start to use more English and speak less of their parents' language, which makes deeper discussion of issues between generations more difficult. This can lead to pushing back discussions about sex and relationships, which gives Asian American children a late start in comparison to their peers. The overall lower amount of open communication compounds difficulties in expressing identity to their community.

Oftentimes, sexual shame accompanies any discussion of sexual orientation. Actively and openly pursuing sexual desires are often discouraged regardless of sexual orientation; however, this effect is exacerbated for LGBT Asian American children and makes it incredibly difficult to come out to family members. Those who belong to Asian cultures may feel that sex is a taboo topic that should not be discussed in detail, and view discussions about sexuality and sexual orientation to be shameful. Asian immigrant parents often feel that nobody else in the community would understand their child's sexuality, and thus prefer to avoid the topic of sexual orientation altogether. The family will oftentimes refuse to acknowledge their sexual orientation even if they have previously discussed it with their family members.

Filial piety is also considered another potential reason for why Asian Americans experience homophobia within their ethnic community. Asian immigrant parents may carry cultural values from their country of origin, including Confucian ideals of filial piety for the eldest son to carry on the family name, care for the parents as they grow old, and respect their ancestors. However, each family is different based on generation of immigrant as well as level of acculturation to "Americanized" views, so level of adherence to traditional values may differ. LGBT Asian American children are viewed as unable to carry on the family name if they are solely attracted to the same-sex and choose not to have children. These traditional values also affect whether or not the child chooses to disclose sexual identity and how the family responds to their child's disclosure.

Unique challenges arise from the Asian American LGBT experience when being gay is considered a form of social deviance that brings shame to the family name for the cultural reasons listed above, making it more difficult to come out to Asian Americans than to other Americans. Sexual orientation disclosure is not an openly celebrated event, and once Asian American children do come out, their parents often believe that their homosexuality is a result of their particular parenting choices, and may shame themselves for not "correcting" their children in an early age.

==== Internalized homophobia ====
The expectations placed on Asian American LGBT people can oftentimes lead to internalization of homophobic attitudes or reluctance to embrace their sexual orientation. If an Asian American LGBT person felt more culturally adherent to Asian country of origin values, they are more likely to experience internalized heterosexism and were less likely to disclose sexual identity to others in comparison to those who did not adhere as much to traditional values. Family-oriented and socially-oriented identity interact with internalized heteronormativity; these three factors influence one's choice to come out or enter a straight marriage.

Managing internalized homophobia in order to keep feelings of inadequacy away includes tactics that respond to external oppression from the Asian American community and from LGBT communities. Some respond to stigma by attempting to pass for straight or continually cover their orientation to avoid discrimination; if family members have been told about sexual orientation, they may simply choose to not discuss the issue and act as if the person is not homosexual. In the cases of some gay Asian men, they respond to stigmatized status by re-appropriating and destigmatizing assumptions of excessive femininity compared to other gay men. Some may also redefine homophobia within the Asian American community as being a Western ideal; if homophobia is framed as not truly being a part of Asian beliefs, gay Asian Americans can reclaim their Asian authenticity.

However, some studies have found that there are no significant differences for the amount of internalized homophobia Asian American LGBT people experience.

==== Acceptance ====
Similarly to other ethnic minorities in the US, the dual minority identity may make a family support network more important to maintain than disowning a child. Yet in Asian American cultures, there is often a lesser degree of overt expression of love, which can affect the parent-and-child relationship after disclosing a non-straight sexual identity. If an Asian American family feels their familial ties are strong, coming out does not represent a permanent split but rather a shift towards a new form of embracing the homosexual family member. This form of acceptance can help LGBT people feel more comfortable in their own identity.

== United Kingdom ==
In the UK, among all racial groups, there is a widespread assumption that being gay is a phenomenon limited to white people. It has been suggested that this means many Black and Minority Ethnic (BME) people's healthcare needs are not being met, and this could be dangerous, because LGBT BME people's needs may differ from those of white LGBT people.

BME LGBT communities are disproportionately affected by homophobic violence, abuse and harassment. A study conducted in London found BME LGBT people are more likely to experience physical abuse and harassment from a stranger, but were equally likely to have experienced verbal abuse as their white LGBT counterparts. Because of the societal pressures of discrimination and victimization, BME LGBT Britons are more likely to have mental health issues.

=== Black British community ===
Circa 2013 Homophobia in the Black British community is prevalent. In the UK, many gay people in the black community get married or have partners of the opposite sex to hide their sexual orientation. In the Black community, hate music against LGBT people has been composed; campaigns such as Stop Murder Music have tried to counteract this, although they have had little success in lessening homophobia within the Black British community. Some have regarded this and other anti-homophobia efforts aimed at the Black British community as racist, which makes many social critics reluctant to criticise homophobia in the Black community.

Some members of the Black British community see homosexuality as a "white disease". Many Black British gay people face being socially isolated from their communities and the possibility of being assaulted or murdered.

=== British Asian community ===
Homophobia remains an issue among the British Asian community as well, although some outside advocates of LGBT acceptance in BME communities have reinforced conservative attitudes towards sexual orientation, receiving criticism for doing so from many LGBT British Asians. Patrick McAleenan has written in The Telegraph that "homophobia taints the British Asian community" and that the "opposition to a gay lifestyle [is] still strong amongst the British Asian community". Balaji Ravichandran commented in The Guardian that while "in the south Asian diaspora, being gay is often deeply taboo"; he also believes the "gay community should help south Asians", pointing to the perceived racism of white gay men against LGBT British Asians.

In 2010, the joint Foreign and Commonwealth Office and British Home Office Forced Marriage Unit noted a 65% increase in forced marriages among primarily British Asian men. Many in the British South Asian community who contacted the FMU were put into forced marriages because their families suspected they were gay or bisexual.

== See also ==
- Interminority racism in the United States
- Racism in the LGBT community
