= Tatiana de la tierra =

Colombian lesbian activist, writer and librarian (1961–2012)

tatiana de la tierra
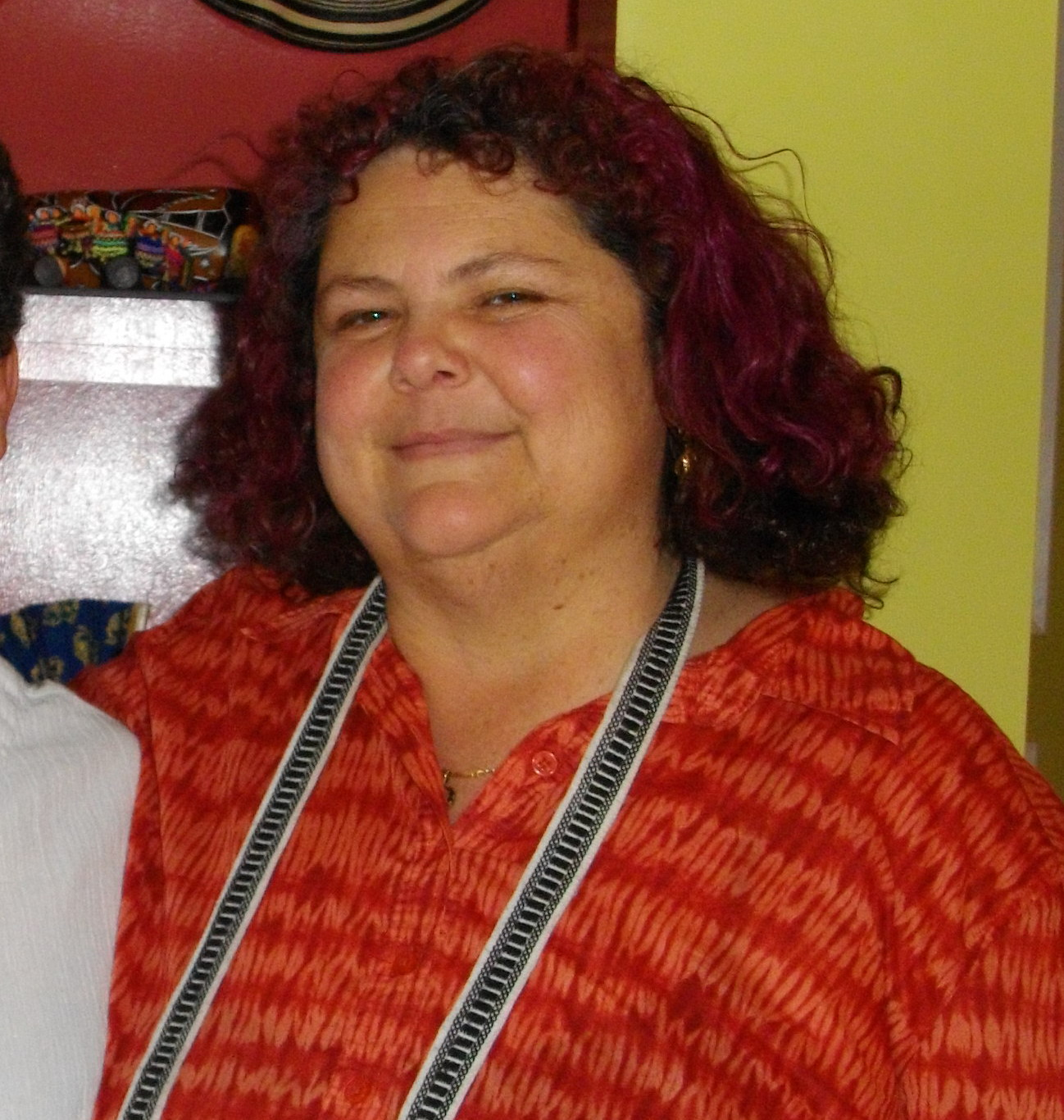
- de la tierra in 2009
- Born: Tatiana Barona; 14 May 1961 Villavicencio, Colombia
- Died: 31 July 2012 (aged 51) Long Beach, California, US
- Occupation: Writer; editor; librarian
- Language: English; Spanish
- Education: Miami-Dade Community College, AA, 1981; University of Florida, BA 1984; University of Texas at El Paso, MA, 1999; University of Buffalo, MLIS, 2000

Website
- delatierra.net

Tatiana Barona (May 14, 1961 – July 31, 2012), known as tatiana de la tierra, was a Colombian lesbian activist, artist, writer, editor and librarian active in the United States. An early pioneer of zines centered on Latina lesbian issues, de la tierra was the founder, editor, and contributor to the Latina lesbian magazines Esto No Tiene Nombre, Conmoción, and La Telaraña.

== Early life and education ==
De la tierra was born Tatiana Barona on May 14, 1961 in Villavicencio, Colombia. Emigrating to the United States in 1969, de la tierra's family settled in Homestead, Florida. de la tierra stated that she knew she was attracted to women around the time she reached the age of 10 or 11, but did not come out as a lesbian until 1982.

Graduating from South Dade Senior High School in 1979, de la tierra later enrolled at Miami-Dade Community College. There, she worked as a library assistant and received her Associate of Arts 1981. Attending the University of Florida, de la tierra earned her Bachelor's in psychology in 1984.

== Career ==
=== Esto no tiene nombre ===
In the 1990s, de la tierra began editing and publishing Esto no tiene nombre, which later became known as Conmoción. Esto no tiene nombre was a quarterly Latina lesbian magazine that published the work of renowned Latina writers: including Cherríe Moraga, Achy Obejas, Carmelita Tropicana, Laura Aguilar, Marcia Ochoa, Juana María Rodríguez and Luz María Umpierre. Much of de la tierra's early work was self-published and distributed by hand, including at the Encuentros de Lesbianas Feministas de América Latina y del Caribe ("Gatherings of Lesbian Feminists of Latin America and the Caribbean").

Esto no tiene nombre began as a magazine without a title and de la tierra tried to get its readers involved in naming the magazine, eventually settling on the current name. Its title is said to be a symbol of rejection towards the heteronormative label and image of Latina lesbians. De la tierra published an article in the journal Aztlán that detailed the internal politics and editorial conflicts surrounding the publication of these magazines, and points of debate connected to the 'sex wars' of the era. The magazine's contents and call for activism were inspired by the feminist work of Kitchen Table: Women of Color Press, and publications such as This Bridge Called My Back.

=== Later career ===
After a while, Esto no tiene nombre and Conmoción ceased publication due to a lack of funding. 1999, she earned her Master's of Fine Arts in creative writing from the University of Texas at El Paso. De la tierra also earned a Master's of Library Science from the University at Buffalo in 2000. Shortly after earning her second master's degree, she began her Jean Blackwell Hutson Library Residency at the University at Buffalo's undergraduate library. Two years later, she was hired by that same library as an information literacy librarian. Later, she moved to California, where she became the director of Hispanic Services at Inglewood Public Library.

== Later life and death ==
Kidney disease led to de la tierra stepping away from her writing, leaving a memoir unfinished.

De la tierra died on July 31, 2012, some time after being diagnosed with stage 4 cancer. Her papers and unpublished materials were donated to the University of California, Los Angeles.

== Reception ==
De la tierra's work endured criticism from conservatives due to the nature of her writings. De la tierra did not hold back when it came to eroticism, with some of her work even compared to pornography. She was shameless about discussing sexuality and this encouraged others to speak freely about sexuality, sex, and the human body.

Sandra K. Soto notes that de la tierra's work challenges heteronormative views. De la tierra became an activist through her work and felt a need to challenge the stereotypes surrounding lesbianism and what it means to be a woman or a woman of color. She also wrote explicitly about fatness as a feminist issue. She wanted schools to incorporate LGBTQ issues and material into their curriculum; more specifically, she hoped this would happen in all English composition classes from elementary to high school to prevent homophobia and educate students on the concept of identity.

== Selected bibliography ==
- The Hickey (1972)
- Esto no tiene nombre OCLC 38913594
- Conmoción
- La telaraña
- For the Hard Ones: A Lesbian Phenomenology/ Para las duras: Una fenomenología lesbica (2002, Calaca Press, ISBN 978-0971703520) OCLC 51032348
- Porcupine Love and Other Tales from my Papaya Buffalo: Chibcha Press, 2005. OCLC 63172922
- Píntame Una Mujer Peligrosa Buffalo, N.Y.: Chibcha, 2005. OCLC 69002745
- tierra 2010: poems, songs & a little blood Long Beach, Calif: Chibcha Press, 2010. OCLC 983754222
- Xía y las mil sirenas (2009, Editorial Patlatonalli, ISBN 9786079511005) (children's book)
