= The Real World: San Francisco =

Third season of television series

Coordinates: 37°48′07″N 122°25′01″W

- Season 3
- The initial cast of The Real World: San Francisco
- Starring: Pedro Zamora; David Rainey; Rachel Campos; Cory Murphy; Pam Ling; Mohammed Bilal; Judd Winick; Jo Rhodes
- No. of episodes: 20

Release
- Original network: MTV
- Original release: June 30 – November 10, 1994

Season chronology
- ← Previous; The Real World: Los Angeles Next → The Real World: London

The Real World: San Francisco is the third season of MTV's reality television series The Real World, which focuses on a group of diverse strangers living together for several months in a different city each season, as cameras follow their lives and interpersonal relationships. It is the second season of The Real World to be filmed in the Pacific States region of the United States, specifically in California after The Real World: Los Angeles.

The season featured a total of eight cast members over the course of the season, as one cast member was evicted and replaced. This is the first season to be filmed in San Francisco, a location later used in the twenty-ninth season, Real World: Ex-Plosion.

The Real World: San Francisco is noteworthy for the depiction of Pedro Zamora's struggle with AIDS, and his and other cast members' confrontations with David "Puck" Rainey, which led to Rainey's eviction. These conflicts provided what Entertainment Weekly called emotional high points for the season, and are credited with making The Real World a hit. It was ranked #7 on Time magazine's list of 32 Epic Moments in Reality-TV History. The season is also notable for featuring the first-ever same-sex commitment ceremony on TV, between Zamora and his partner, Sean Sasser.

== Casting ==
This season was the first to feature a castmember, Pedro Zamora, dealing with a life-threatening illness. Future seasons would feature castmembers dealing with other illnesses, such as Lyme disease and cystic fibrosis. This is also the first season to feature an Asian American, Pam Ling, and two Hispanic Americans, Pedro Zamora and Rachel Campos.

Singer Jewel stated in a 2017 interview that she was offered an opportunity to be a cast member but declined, fearing it would be the wrong path for her career.

Casting was completed by January 1994, by which time the cast was informed that one of their housemates would be HIV-positive, though they did not learn which one it was until the day they moved into their Russian Hill house, on February 12, 1994. The cast was filmed until they moved out on June 19. The season premiered on June 30 of that year and consisted of 20 episodes.

== The residence ==
The cast lived in a house at 949 Lombard Street in San Francisco, California from February 12 to June 19, 1994. The house is located between Leavenworth Street and Jones Street, one block east of the eight sharp turns that have earned the street the distinction of being "the crookedest street in the United States". Production renovated the third and fourth floors of the building for filming. A June 8, 2000 fire caused approximately $2 million in damage to the house. Several years after the fire, the building was completely renovated, and bears only a slight resemblance to its appearance in 1994. The renovations include a second garage on the east side of the house, atop of which sits a patio. It went up for sale as a three-unit triplex at a price of $7 million in 2017.

== Cast ==
Cast member	Age (Note: Age at the time of filming.)	Hometown
Cory Murphy	20	Fresno, California
Cory is a junior at the University of California, San Diego, and the most important issue facing her is what she will do after graduation. She works as a hostess at an Italian restaurant, and enjoys the outdoors and photography. The longest relationship she's ever been in lasted a year and a half, though she says she doesn't think she's ever been in love. She struggles with adapting to life in the city, and though she grows close to Rachel, she feels excluded when Rachel becomes close with Jo.
Judd Winick	24	Dix Hills, New York
Judd is a struggling animator and cartoonist. A cum laude graduate of the University of Michigan, he had a deal with Universal Press Syndicate, but it was cancelled six months into development. He does freelance cartoon work for greeting cards, flyers and T-shirts. A recurring theme throughout the season is his unsuccessful search for love.
Mohammed Bilal	24	San Francisco, California
Mohammed is the lead singer and songwriter for Midnight Voices, a band well known throughout the San Francisco Bay area, though he supports himself doing makeovers at The Body Shop and working at his father's dance club, The Upper Room, where he occasionally reads poetry. He also tries to balance this with his schoolwork, and his girlfriend of six months, a ballerina named Stephanie. Mohammed, whom MTV describes as "a mellow, spiritual guy", is a practicing Muslim.
Pam Ling	26	Los Angeles, California
Pam is a third-year medical student at the University of California, San Francisco. She was her high school's valedictorian and graduated Phi Beta Kappa from Harvard College/Radcliffe. Pam claims that she has never failed at anything in her life and is an extremely motivated perfectionist. She hopes to be a physician who will relate to people's social and spiritual needs as well as their physical ones. She provides health care for the homeless as part of her studies.
Pedro Zamora	22	Miami, Florida
Pedro is an openly gay, HIV-positive AIDS educator who lectures publicly on safe sex. He was born in Havana, Cuba, and came to the United States in 1980 at age 8 with the Mariel boat lift. Leaving his family behind to move to San Francisco was extremely difficult, but he chose to do so on the insistence of his best friend and roommate, Alex Escarno, who felt he could more easily communicate his message. He is close to his sister Mily.
David "Puck" Rainey	25	San Francisco, California
Puck is a bicycle messenger who frequently gets into vehicular accidents on his bike. His hobby is racing soap boxes. He is perceived as the rebellious "bad boy" in the cast. He has a sister, and is close to his mother and grandparents. Because of his contentious relationship with the rest of the cast (People magazine called him "obnoxious"), he is evicted from the house in Episode 11, though he briefly reappears in subsequent episodes.
Rachel Campos	23	Tempe, Arizona
Rachel graduated from Arizona State University in December 1993 with a degree in International Relations and a Woodrow Wilson Graduate Fellowship. She plans to attend graduate school in the fall, and hopes to be a college professor, she expresses indecision on where she will attend during the season. She is a passionate Republican whose heroes include Jack Kemp, and though raised a strict Catholic, she is rebellious, as she claims to enjoy upsetting her parents. She concedes that she is sometimes a bad judge of character initially, and trusts too easily. She has two brothers and a sister named Julie. Judd observes that Rachel likes "bad boys", rather than nice guys, a point that Rachel concedes. It is for this reason that Judd feels Rachel is attracted to Puck. After Puck is evicted, Rachel becomes best friends with Jo, who moves in as Puck's replacement. Judd refers to them as the "high maintenance twins".
Jo Rhodes	22	London, England
Jo moves in after Puck is evicted. She was living in Lake Tahoe prior to joining the cast. She loves the outdoors and extreme sports such as rock climbing. A lifelong independent person, she married in June 1993, but soon divorced because of her husband's abuse. She filed a restraining order against him, which he challenged in court and lost. She is now starting over, trying to make it through school on her own, and does not wish any conflict in her life. Her former roommate Steve has helped her through her difficult times, but Jo does not reciprocate Steve's desire to move beyond friendship. She is a strict vegan, and induces vomiting in one episode after learning that food she ate contained pork.

=== Duration of cast ===
Cast members	Episodes																			
Cast members	1	2	3	4	5	6	7	8	9	10	11	12	13	14	15	16	17	18	19	20
Cory	Featured	Featured	Featured	Featured	Featured	Featured	Featured	Featured	Featured	Featured	Featured	Featured	Featured	Featured	Featured	Featured	Featured	Featured	Featured	Featured
Judd	Featured	Featured	Featured	Featured	Featured	Featured	Featured	Featured	Featured	Featured	Featured	Featured	Featured	Featured	Featured	Featured	Featured	Featured	Featured	Featured
Mohammed	Featured	Featured	Featured	Featured	Featured	Featured	Featured	Featured	Featured	Featured	Featured	Featured	Featured	Featured	Featured	Featured	Featured	Featured	Featured	Featured
Pam	Featured	Featured	Featured	Featured	Featured	Featured	Featured	Featured	Featured	Featured	Featured	Featured	Featured	Featured	Featured	Featured	Featured	Featured	Featured	Featured
Pedro	Featured	Featured	Featured	Featured	Featured	Featured	Featured	Featured	Featured	Featured	Featured	Featured	Featured	Featured	Featured	Featured	Featured	Featured	Featured	Featured
Rachel	Featured	Featured	Featured	Featured	Featured	Featured	Featured	Featured	Featured	Featured	Featured	Featured	Featured	Featured	Featured	Featured	Featured	Featured	Featured	Featured
Jo														Entered (Note: Jo replaced Puck in Episode 14.)	Featured	Featured	Featured	Featured	Featured	Featured
Puck	Featured	Featured	Featured	Featured	Featured	Featured	Featured	Featured	Featured	Featured	Kicked (Note: Puck was kicked out of the house in Episode 11 after all of his cast members voted him out of the house.)		Appeared (Note: Puck makes appearances in Episodes 13, 14, 19 and 20.)	Appeared					Appeared	Appeared

- Puck was kicked out of the house in episode 11 after all of his cast members voted him out of the house.
- Jo replaced Puck in episode 14.
- Puck makes appearances in episodes 13, 14, 19 and 20.

== Episodes ==
No. overall	No. in season	Title	Original release date
35	1	"Planes, Trains and Paddywagons"	June 30, 1994
Cory meets with AIDS educator Pedro, whom she immediately likes, but is crestfallen to learn he is HIV-positive himself. Liberal Long Island cartoonist Judd meets with Arizona State University graduate Rachel, whom he immediately likes, but his enthusiasm is tempered upon learning that she is a Republican. At the house, they meet med student Pam and musician Mohammed. Bike messenger Puck shows up to the house later after having been arrested, and immediately makes an impression with his eccentricity. Pedro reveals his HIV status to the others by showing them his scrapbook as an educator. Although Pam and Cory react positively, Rachel is made uncomfortable by the revelation, and walks away, concerned over how living with someone with HIV will affect her.
36	2	"Love Stinks"	July 7, 1994
As Valentine's Day nears, Pedro and the others take issue with Puck's lack of manners and hygiene, though Rachel finds him interesting, despite this. The cast attempts to address these issues during a house meeting, but Puck rejects their suggestions. Pedro and Rachel discuss her reaction to his scrapbook presentation in the previous episode, which he took as a sign of rejection.
37	3	"White Like Me"	July 14, 1994
Rachel pursues politically oriented work, sparking a discussion on politics with the others, and ridicule on their part. The cast attends a poetry reading at Mohammed's father's club, where Mohammed reads some of his work, inspiring self-consciousness in Cory, who is still adjusting to life in San Francisco. Pedro begins dating fellow activist Sean Sasser, whom he met at a march in Washington, D.C. Cory's questions about Mohammed's girlfriend, Stephanie, lead to a discussion about race.
38	4	"From a Six to a Nine and Back Again"	July 21, 1994
Judd pursues romantic opportunities. The housemates find communicating with Puck to be difficult. Puck goes to court to address his required drunk driving rehabilitation. He is later offended when only Rachel attends his soapbox derby, but the cast feel he is playing the victim for not being able to monopolize all of their time. Puck, who has developed a mutual dislike of Pedro, responds by not participating in Pedro's birthday celebration, and developing further conflict with Cory.
39	5	"You Gotta Have Art"	July 28, 1994
Judd shows his cartoons to the San Francisco Examiner and an LA production company, and talks about his career difficulties. Mohammed and Puck disagree over their perceptions about rap music, though Puck is supportive of Mohammed's work. Judd and Pam grow close, and spend time with Christopher, her long-distance boyfriend of eight years. Judd's strip, "Nuts and Bolts", is published in the Examiner.
40	6	"Trouble in Paradise"	August 4, 1994
Judd and Rachel flirt, as do Rachel and Puck. Pedro, who is concerned about the gay jokes the latter two make over the phone, ponders his relationship with Sean. The cast offers their opinions of Rachel's taste in men, but Rachel perceives Puck to be interfering in her life. Rachel's friends visit, providing social opportunities for Puck and Judd, and provoking tension with Rachel.
41	7	"Coffee and Sympathy"	August 11, 1994
Cory, Rachel, Pam and Puck discuss their frustration with their career and educational prospects. As Puck continues to resolve his legal difficulties, he finds a stray dog and takes it home. Cory sees a man named Geoff, but he may not be right for her.
42	8	"Together and Apart"	August 18, 1994
Pedro and Judd attend a memorial for reporter/author Randy Shilts, who died of AIDS, but are troubled by the presence of anti-gay protesters. As Pedro's CD4 T cells drop, the White House coordinates an NBC interview with him. He speaks at Stanford University, but the cast is frustrated by Puck's monopolization of conversations in which Pedro attempts to speak with them, and by Puck's dismissal of Pedro's work.
43	9	"Collision Course"	August 25, 1994
Pedro and Puck's conflict continues, and as Pedro isolates himself from Puck, he finds himself isolating himself from the others by extension. Pedro announces his engagement to Sean, and Puck dismisses it as a joke. Puck openly states that he dislikes Pedro, and feels no need to change for him or anyone, leading to an emotional group discussion among the others.
44	10	"Kiss and Tell"	September 1, 1994
Puck's relationship with the rest of the cast breaks down, including his friendship with Rachel, amid the revelation that they kissed on three prior occasions. They discuss how to deal with Puck over Mohammed's birthday dinner. Puck announces that he and Toni Cook, a girl he and Rachel met in the park, are getting married on Mother's Day.
45	11	"Getting Dropped"	September 8, 1994
A house meeting in which the cast attempts to convince Puck to cease his abusive and inconsiderate behavior ends in a heated argument, obstinacy by Puck, and an ultimatum by Pedro, who threatens to move out if Puck stays. After much soul-searching, the cast decides to evict Puck.
46	12	"Rebel, Rebel"	September 15, 1994
Following Puck's eviction, the cast adjusts to the more peaceful atmosphere in the house. Rachel discusses her rebellious relationship with her parents. Rachel and Pedro grow closer, and he accompanies her to Arizona to meet her family, and to speak at a local school. Judd hosts a mock episode of This Is Your Life in the house for Pam's birthday, which includes a surprise appearance by Christopher.
47	13	"Homecoming"	September 22, 1994
Pedro goes to Miami for four days to visit his family and friends. Puck meets with Cory, and complains about their eviction of him, prompting a discussion of his manipulation of others. Pedro's best friend, Alex Escarno, questions Pedro's decision to stay in San Francisco with Sean after the show, given his health, which experiences problems during his visit.
48	14	"Old Fish, New Fish"	September 29, 1994
Attempts to spend time with Puck outside the house lead to further discussions about his abusiveness. The cast auditions three people to be their new housemate, and picks Jo Rhodes. An avid rock climber, Jo takes Rachel and Cory rock climbing with her after moving in.
49	15	"Why Is Love Like An Elevator"	October 6, 1994
Judd and Rachel continue to explore romantic opportunities. Jo goes to court to address her ex-husband's appeal of her restraining order against him. Cory and Steve accompany her to Lake Tahoe, where the restraining order is upheld.
50	16	"Love and Death"	October 13, 1994
Mohammed and Stephanie break up, but Mohammed finds that he isn't ready to abandon what he has with her. Pedro discusses his work and his future, while his health causes grave concern in the others. After he receives treatment for pneumonia, he improves, and the cast enjoys a horseback riding excursion.
51	17	"Hawaii"	October 20, 1994
The cast is sent on a trip to Maui, where their adventures include surfing lessons that meet with mixed success along gender lines, snorkeling instructors that cause tension with Judd, a rain-soaked bicycling trip with an eccentric tour guide, treacherous cliff diving, food that challenges cherished beliefs, and a helicopter tour of the island.
52	18	"Just Friends"	October 27, 1994
Jo struggles with her schoolwork, and with Steve, whose desire to move beyond friendship she does not reciprocate, and who becomes abusive as a result. Cory feels excluded by Rachel and Jo's close friendship. Rachel invites the cast to an Empower America conference, but when Judd comes away with objections to their politics, his comments offend her.
53	19	"Love Rules"	November 3, 1994
Alex Escarno visits for Pedro and Sean's commitment ceremony, but he tries to convince Pedro to move back to Miami with Sean, rather than stay in San Francisco as he plans. Puck invites his former housemates to his soap box derby, but none are interested in attending. During the ceremony, which is held at the house, Pedro and Sean exchange vows and wedding bands.
54	20	"Last Call"	November 10, 1994
As the cast's stay in the house nears its end, Cory, Pedro, Judd and Pam decide to take one last group trip to Monterey. Meanwhile, Rachel and Jo continue to bond, and Mohammed concentrates on his music. Puck persistently leaves offensive messages on the cast's answering machine. As the housemates leave the house for good, they reflect on their time together, with some regretting that they did not spend more time together, but feel the experience has changed them for the better.

== After filming ==
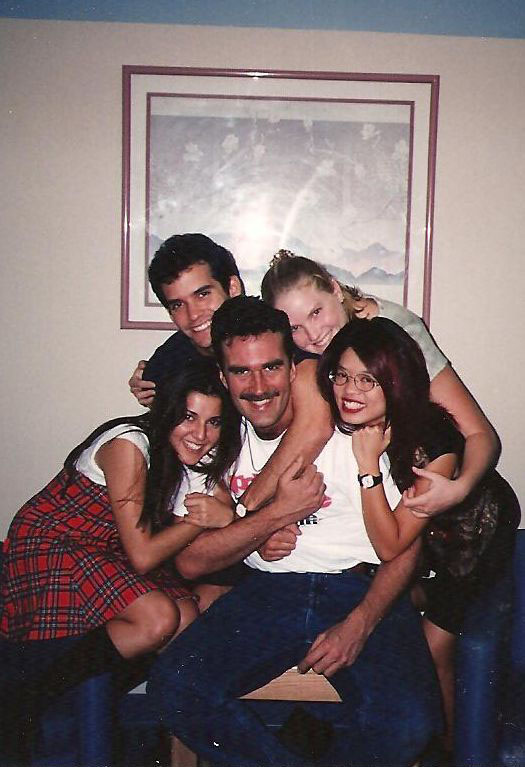
Alex Escarano with Pam, Judd, Rachel and Cory at Mercy Hospital in Miami on November 11, 1994, a few hours before Pedro died.

Pedro Zamora fell ill and was hospitalized in New York in October 1994. He was eventually flown to Miami, and was diagnosed with progressive multifocal leukoencephalopathy, or PML. He received a phone call from President Bill Clinton, who thanked him for his work, and helped facilitate emigration of his older brothers, who were flown to Miami from Cuba, reuniting them for the first time in 14 years. A benefit was held to pay for his medical expenses, at which President Clinton praised Pedro. MTV began a trust in order to pay for Zamora's medical costs, as he had no medical insurance. Zamora died on November 11, 1994, hours after the debut airing of the season finale. The money from the benefit was used to form the Pedro Zamora Memorial Fund. His best friend and roommate, Judd Winick, began to lecture on HIV/AIDS and safe sex for him, and did so for three years.

The 1995 reunion show, The Real World Reunion, which assembled the casts from the first four seasons of The Real World, was marked by antagonism between Puck and his former castmates. Though some members of the audience and the other seasons' casts expressed interest or fascination with Puck and his antics, his confrontation with his former roommate, Mohammed, resulted in Puck's distancing himself from Mohammed physically, and harsh words from others on the stage, such as second season cast member Irene Berrera-Kearns, led to him temporarily leaving the studio.

During the course of his career writing and illustrating comics, Judd Winick has explored LGBT issues, including storylines involving gay bashing, HIV and AIDS, in books such as Green Lantern and Green Arrow. He chronicled his friendship with Zamora in his 2000 autobiographical graphic novel, Pedro and Me: Friendship, Loss and What I Learned. He created the animated TV series The Life & Times of Juniper Lee in 2005.

Pam Ling went onto a career in medicine and education. As of 2024 she was a Professor of Medicine at the University of California San Francisco. She and Judd fell in love during the vigil they kept over Pedro, married in 2001, and had two children. Their wedding marked the first time two cast members of The Real World married.

Rachel Campos appeared on Road Rules: All Stars, where she met Sean Duffy of The Real World: Boston. They eventually married, and as of May 2016, have eight children. They live in Ashland, Wisconsin, where Sean was a District Attorney of Ashland County before being elected to Congress in 2010. She welcomed her ninth child, a daughter, Valentina StellaMaris on October 1, 2019. Campos also appeared in The Wedding Video, a 2002 spoof of The Real World written and directed by The Real World: New York alumnus Norman Korpi, which starred ten alumni of various Real World seasons. Rachel works at Fox News as the co-host of Fox & Friends Weekend.

Puck Rainey served as the host for Road Rules: All Stars, and competed on Battle of the Sexes, during which he came into conflict with David Edwards of The Real World: Los Angeles, and married on camera Betty, his fiancée and mother of his two sons, Bogart and Rocco. As of 2008, he was working as a truck driver. As of 2009, the family lives in Alabama, where Rainey makes a living through public appearances and miscellaneous jobs. In his spare time, he enjoys gardening and photography, though he prefers to model, whereas his partner works behind the camera. Spanky Ham, one of the main characters on the animated reality television spoof Drawn Together has been compared by that show's creators to Rainey.

At the 2008 The Real World Awards Bash, Pedro and Sean received a nomination for "Favorite Love Story", Pedro also received a nomination for "Best Fight" with Puck, the latter was in the running for the "Roommate You Love to Hate" award, and in the "Gone Baby Gone" category.

As of 2023, Cory Murphy is a teacher of middle-school Spanish and language arts in Southern California, and a mother of two.

As of 2023, Mohammed Bilal is a director of diversity initiatives at Stanford University Human Resources, and a father of two.

A 2008 film by Nick Oceano, Pedro, chronicles Zamora's life.

A 2021 documentary by William T. Horner, Keep the Cameras Rolling: The Pedro Zamora Way is a chronicle of Pedro's journey with AIDS and reality television.

Pedro's widower, Sean Sasser, continued his activism for LGBT issues, and his work as an HIV educator. In 1995, he spoke at the inaugural White House AIDS conference, and was appointed by President Bill Clinton to the Presidential Advisory Council on HIV/AIDS. He moved to Atlanta in late 1994, in order to be with his boyfriend, and hoped to open a café. He was later a pastry chef at Ritz-Carlton hotel properties and head pastry chef at a luxury hotel in Portland before settling in Washington DC in 2012, where, as a pastry chef at a restaurant called RIS, he was praised by the Washington Blade for his work there. In June 2013 Sasser married Michael Kaplan, whom he had dated off and on since the 1990s, and with whom he had moved in six months prior. While in Washington, Sasser served as a board member of the AIDS Alliance for Children, Youth and Families. He was active in youth and mentoring organizations, and he and Kaplan served as foster parents to a 4-year-old girl. In July 2013, Sasser, who had also been HIV positive for 25 years, was diagnosed with mesothelioma, a rare cancer of the lungs. He died at his home on August 7, 2013, at the age of 44. He is survived by his mother, Patricia Sasser of Detroit, and a younger sister.

=== The Challenge ===
Cast member	Seasons of The Challenge
Cory Murphy	—N/a
David "Puck" Rainey	Battle of the Sexes
Judd Winick	—N/a
Mohammed Bilal	—N/a
Pam Ling	—N/a
Pedro Zamora	—N/a
Rachel Campos	Road Rules: All Stars
Joanna "Jo" Rhodes	The Gauntlet 2

David "Puck" Rainey served as Mr. Big on the first season of The Challenge
