= The Real World: Boston =

Coordinates: 42°21′28″N 71°04′15″W

- Season 6
- The cast of The Real World: Boston
- Starring: Jason Cornwell; Montana McGlynn; Sean Duffy; Kameelah Phillips; Genesis Moss; Elka Walker; Syrus Yarbrough
- No. of episodes: 23

Release
- Original network: MTV
- Original release: July 15 – December 10, 1997

Season chronology
- ← Previous; The Real World: Miami Next → The Real World: Seattle

The Real World: Boston is the sixth season of MTV's reality television series The Real World, which focuses on a group of diverse strangers living together for several months in a different city each season, as cameras follow their lives and interpersonal relationships. It is the only season of The Real World to be filmed in the New England region of the United States, specifically in Massachusetts.

The season featured seven people who lived in a converted historic firehouse at 127 Mt. Vernon Street, Boston, Massachusetts, which is located right off of Charles Street and was also used in the television series Spenser: For Hire. The season premiered on July 15, 1997 and consisted of 23 episodes.

== Assignment ==
Almost every season of The Real World, beginning with its fifth season, has included the assignment of a season-long group job or task to the housemates. The Boston cast worked with children at an after-school program in East Boston. Some of the cast worry they will not get along with youngsters or like the job, but in the end they all enjoy it. Montana, however, was fired from the job as a result of allegations involving alcohol and has to find another way to volunteer, since she is required to volunteer for 20 hours a week by contract while she is in Boston. Kameelah and Elka also get into trouble for an argument they have, within earshot of the children, stemming from Kameelah's anger towards Elka for discussing what she believes was a sexual interlude that Kameelah had at the house. At the end of the season, Syrus becomes emotional when he talks about how he will miss the children.

== The residence ==
The cast lived in a 2,500-square-foot (230 m^{2}) converted firehouse at 127 Mt. Vernon Street in Beacon Hill, a 19th-century downtown Boston residential neighborhood. During filming, the Firehouse, which originally housed the Safety Inspectors for the Boston Fire Department, featured two double bedrooms and one triple bedroom. The Control Room was located in the basement. The Firehouse had previously been seen as the home of Spenser on the 1980s TV series Spenser: For Hire. It is currently occupied by Hill House, a non-profit community center.

== Cast ==
Cast member	Age (Note: Age at the time of filming.)	Hometown
Elka Walker	19	Brownsville, Texas
Elka is a Mexican American who comes from a well-to-do background with conservative values. She says in the casting special that she doesn't know many gay or lesbian people (aside from a gay male couple who ran a restaurant in her hometown), and wasn't sure how she would feel if one of the roommates was gay. She is still struggling with her mother's death from cancer. Before she leaves for Boston, Elka's father requires her to sign a contract saying she will not smoke, do drugs, or have premarital sex while in Boston. She is later filmed having a cigarette. She gets her eyebrow pierced against her father's wishes, and she finally stands up for herself against his controlling ways in a tear-filled phone conversation later in the season. Kameelah suspects that her father is controlling of her because he is still in mourning over the recent death of her mother. Her boyfriend, Walter, visits from Ireland. The housemates expect she will have sex with him, but Elka insists she is a virgin and will stay that way until marriage.
Jason Cornwell	24	Boulder, Colorado
Jason is a poet with a girlfriend named Timber. The relationship is tumultuous and Timber shows signs of bipolar disorder, and Genesis expresses displeasure at how Jason talks to Timber. Jason is not faithful to her in Boston.
Montana McGlynn	21	Manhattan, New York
Named for a character in Kurt Vonnegut's novel Slaughterhouse Five, Montana is an atheist, fond of science, is seen smoking cigars in the series, and an ardent feminist. She is committed to her boyfriend, Vaj, but he later discovers she is seeing other men while in Boston. He later breaks up with her by sending her a page. While she is surprised by this, her housemates are not. Later, she is fired from her volunteer job for allowing children to take sips of alcohol while on a field trip, which the children corroborate, despite Montana's denials. She subsequently seeks out other volunteer work.
Genesis Moss	20	Gulfport, Mississippi
Genesis is a lesbian with a troubled past and says that during her childhood, she sometimes lacked basics like food. She has a long-distance lover. She becomes friends with a gay drag queen named Adam and spends a lot of time dancing and partying at a gay club. She is in tears when a child at the daycare center says that she hates gay people. Kameelah explains to the child that it's wrong to hate gay people.
Sean Duffy	25	Hayward, Wisconsin
Sean is a conservative Republican and an aspiring lawyer who competes in lumberjack competitions. He often clashes with the liberal-minded Kameelah. He later says he feels for Genesis because she is so hard on herself.
Kameelah Phillips	19	San Diego, California
Kameelah is a student at Stanford University. Like Montana, she never knew her father. She tells her mother that she is not having sex, but the housemates hear what sounds to them like Kameelah and a man having sex in the house. She threatens to "knock out" Elka in an argument at the daycare, for which she and Elka are both reprimanded.
Syrus Yarbrough	25	Santa Monica, California
Syrus is African American and is named after the Egyptian god Osiris. He gets in trouble for dating the mother of one of the youngsters. The director tells Syrus to cease this immediately. Syrus acknowledges this, but he and the woman continue dating a little while longer.

== Episodes ==
No. overall	No. in season	Title	Original release date
100	1	"Moving In: Boston"	July 15, 1997
The roommates move into their new home and begin getting to know each other and learning their way around Boston. The seven cast members have very different personality traits, creating some interesting conflicts. Jason and Genesis immediately bond and want to room together, along with Syrus. Elka and Montana decide to room together and Kameelah and Sean are the two left in the end. The extremely religious beliefs held by Catholic Elka cause some issues with other cast members, and it makes Genesis wonder if she should even tell Elka that she is a lesbian. The group ends the night by going to dinner, and then to a club. Despite their differences, they all appear to be getting along just fine for now.
101	2	"Religion"	July 16, 1997
The roommates have problems with Elka and Kameelah. Elka is too religious, and Kameelah is too bossy. At dinner, Elka learns Montana does not believe in religion. The roommates go out for a night at the bars, but Elka, being underage, can't get in. Alone, Genesis tells Elka she is a lesbian, and to her surprise Elka takes it pretty well.
102	3	"Black & White"	July 23, 1997
Kameelah's initial warmth toward the burly Syrus fades when she discovers that he's a ladies’ man, and the ladies he likes are white. A lumberjack training comes in handy when Sean and Jason try to bury the hatchet. Meanwhile, Genesis begins to wonder if she was too hasty in deciding she is gay. All the guys seem to wish she'd reconsider.
103	4	"Blast From the Past"	July 30, 1997
Tensions rise as the group begins work at an after-school program for youngsters. The group begins to tell each other secrets about their past. Genesis says she had a bad childhood, and Syrus says he has been accused of rape before. This initiates an extended conversation about rape in which Montana and Syrus disagree. As the group tries to find the bus to take them home, they got lost. Kameelah and Sean fight, and he calls her a bitch. The two finish their argument once they get home, but they both realize that they are two different people.
104	5	"Elka's Shell"	August 6, 1997
The anniversary of Elka's mother's death has arrived and she is less and less enthusiastic as the days go on. The group decides to go out and get drunk while Elka stays home. To cheer her up and to "break her shell," they all jump on her, get naked and dance with pool cues on the pool table. Genesis is extremely annoyed with the other roommates and feels "out of her element" because she has no other gay people surrounding her. She tries to fix this by chatting on a web site for "transsexuals" and meets a wonderful man who dresses in drag. She also feels better when she finds a gay bookstore. Jason, Elka, and Montana create the English/Scottish band "Scotch Tape" and take pictures goofing off as "band members."
105	6	"200 Things List a Guy Has To Be To Date Kameelah"	August 13, 1997
Kameelah has a list of over 200 requirements that a man must meet in order to be her boyfriend. Her list includes things such as "must have a name with more than one syllable" and "must be able to dance." So when she goes out with Aaron, she uses this list to see if he lives up to her standards. He definitely does not. He asks her out again and she begrudgingly says yes. There is obvious chemistry between Montana and Sean, but all that dwindles when Montana's boyfriend Vaj comes to visit. Once he arrives, everything falls back into place for them and she realizes how much it hurts when he is not physically present in her life.
106	7	"If A Tree Falls In The Firehouse, Will Anyone Not Hear It?"	August 20, 1997
Tensions build as Jason's girlfriend Timber visits the house, and he is unsure of where this visit will take them. Their first few days are wonderful, and the cast even overhears them have sex in the shower. It is not until they go to a bar with Syrus and she accuses Jason of being jealous of Syrus that their problems begin. After a night of screaming and yelling, Timber leaves and the two decide to split so Jason can be on his own for a bit. Meanwhile, Syrus and Sean get into many conversations about how Black people have been repressed.
107	8	"He Loves Me, She Loves Me Not"	August 27, 1997
Montana and Vaj agreed that they could see other people while she was away in Boston, but the thought of it actually happening is another story. Montana feels guilty when she meets a man named Matt and begins to fall for him more than she thought she would. Genesis finally comes out of her shell when she, Kameelah and Sean go to a gay bar. Genesis makes a new friend named Adam, who is also known as Eve when he's dressed in drag. While at the bar, Genesis begins dancing with another woman and kisses her. This freaks her out because she doesn't want Tammy, her longtime girlfriend, to be upset. Genesis and Tammy end up breaking up because the strain of having a relationship with so many issues has become a problem.
108	9	"Dating Policy (aka Syrus Plays by the Rules, part 1)"	September 3, 1997
Syrus meets Luetta, mother of a child at the ASP. Tensions rise towards Syrus, as Kameelah does not believe in dating anyone from work, and Montana doesn't feel that he is taking the job seriously. Montana asks Anthony if there is a policy about dating parents, and Anthony says it is prohibited. The roommates feel it is not Montana's business to tell Anthony about Syrus, but if Syrus gets fired from the ASP, they feel he needs to be kicked out of the loft.
109	10	"The Girls in the House, The Girl out of the Closet (a.k.a. Syrus Plays by His Own Rules, part 2)"	September 10, 1997
Tension continues between Syrus and Montana over late-night phone calls and the constant stream of guests Syrus brings through the loft. Kameelah finds Ed, a friend of Syrus's, making out with a girl in their bathroom. Syrus hates all the women in the loft except Genesis. Genesis, however, is dealing with her own issues. She feels like she doesn't have anything to offer the ASP youngsters and feels disconnected because she is gay. Kameelah and Genesis have a discussion with a girl from the program about gay people and what she thinks of them. Anthony has difficulty understanding why Genesis is having such a hard time at the ASP, but has no problem dealing with Syrus' situation. He delivers an ultimatum to Syrus: If he continues to see Luetta, he can't work at the center. Syrus agrees to end the relationship, but continues to see her anyway.
110	11	"Don't Look Under This Sequined Tee, With Anyone Else But Me"	September 17, 1997
Genesis talks about her love for drag queens and her growing affection for Adam when he performs as Eve at a local drag show. She tells Adam she loves him, but gets angry when he talks to another guy. Kameelah doesn't understand how Genesis can fall for a drag queen when he is a man. Genesis argues that maybe she is bisexual. Adam says that he loves Genesis, but he thinks she just wants him so that she can have "someone." He tells her that she needs to start putting herself first and truly act on how she feels. Kameelah is dealing with issues of the heart as well. She is dating Doug on a regular basis, going to dinner and attending his step show performance. Kameelah really likes Doug, but is having a problem because he has a daughter and she doesn't date men with children. But when she sees how Doug acts around his daughter, Kameelah thinks that he is worth it and decides to try to make it work. Meanwhile, Sean gets a bad case of hives and ends up going to the hospital for treatment.
111	12	"Sweet Tarts And Sour Hearts"	September 24, 1997
Montana plans on seeing Matt for Valentine's Day, since Vaj is busy working. She thinks Vaj shouldn't care since they gave each other permission to see other people. Sean and Kameelah think Montana could hurt Vaj's feelings by seeing someone else on Valentine's Day. Montana yells at Vaj, telling him he could have come to Boston, but it's too late now since she has plans. Even after the argument, Montana spends Valentine's Day with Matt. Afterwards, Matt tells Montana he will miss her while Vaj is in town. When Vaj arrives, Montana is not overly excited to see him. Vaj wonders what's wrong, since she claimed she couldn't wait for him to arrive, and now that he is there, she wants him to go. Montana seems torn between the two men. Vaj leaves Boston unhappy about the trip and his future with Montana. Meanwhile, Elka is getting frustrated with her long-distance relationship with Walter. She wants him to visit, but he keeps putting it off. Elka offers to have her dad pay for half of the trip, but Walter refuses. Adam tells Elka that dating a musician is difficult and she will have to expect to take a back seat to Walter’s music career. But Walter surprises Elka when he tells her that he has enough money for the trip and won't need her dad's help.
112	13	"No Man Is An Island"	October 1, 1997
Anthony sends the roommates on assignment to Puerto Rico, where they will set up a computer and pen-pal program at a Boys and Girls Club. All the roommates are excited to go except Elka, who was hoping for a trip to Europe. The roommates talk to the ASP children about Puerto Rico and take their photos for the pen-pal program. When they arrive in San Juan, the meet Jan, who runs the Galleria where they are staying. The roommates meet some of the Puerto Rican children at the Boys and Girls Club and attempt to set up the computer and pen-pal software. Montana has her own setting up to do, however, when she meets Rafael and decides to go out on a date with him—with Elka as her chaperone. They end up leaving Elka and head out to the beach for a midnight swim. Later, Montana tells Sean and Jason that when she was little, she tried to contact her real father, but her letter was returned unopened with a note that said not to contact him. The roommates spend a day of fun and sun at Palomino Island. Some get more sun than others. Montana flashes Sean and his video camera. On their last night in Puerto Rico, they have dinner with Jan and have a good discussion about affirmative action. Genesis feels uncomfortable talking with the roommates. Jan suggests that everyone should just relax.
113	14	"Liar, Liar, Pants on Fire"	October 8, 1997
Timber moves to Boston, crowding Jason, who is not sure that he wants her there. Jason is angry that Timber lied about her drug use and that she stayed with another guy while they were apart. Timber attempts to win Jason back, but he wants to be left alone. Jason ends up forgiving Timber, but only after he goes to a party and ends up kissing another girl. Meanwhile, Montana's dual relationships with Matt and Vaj are coming to a head. Montana really likes Matt but decides to stay with Vaj. She dumps Matt, but then Vaj, jealous of her other relationship, dumps Montana. The roommates listen as Montana defends herself against Vaj's accusations. The roommates side with Vaj, saying Montana is the one at fault. Montana goes to New York to patch things up with Vaj, who wants to bury the past and concentrate on their future together.
114	15	"Noises & Rumors"	October 15, 1997
Elka's father and brother arrive in Boston for a visit. Her father is worried, and doesn't approve of Elka's new ideas about the world, of her having had her eyebrow pierced, of her hanging out with Genesis at gay bars, or of her continued desire to be with Walter. Meanwhile, Kameelah continues hanging out with Doug. But when Doug denies seeing another woman, they argue and she hangs up on him. Later they apologize and end up in her room while Elka and Sean listen. Elka thinks Kameelah had sex with Doug and confronts Kameelah at the ASP in front of the children. They are sent home and the next day, and Anthony tells them that "melodramatic outbursts" can't happen at ASP. He will not suspend anyone, but more serious action will occur if it happens again. Anthony tells Kameelah that she is the only roommate who is taking her volunteer job seriously. Kameelah wonders why there is backlash against her, while Montana thinks Kameelah is being hypocritical. At the end of the episode, Elka is seen getting an eyebrow piercing.
115	16	"Pent-Up Emotions In The Pig Pen (a.k.a. Communication)"	October 22, 1997
The loft is a mess. Sean, Syrus and Montana decide to clean the house and keep it that way. The roommates attend an ASP ski trip, where Anthony assigns them to watch the youngsters. Sean and Jason skip out on the youngsters and ski on their own. Anthony is disappointed in Sean's behavior. Sean confronts Genesis, feeling that she ignores him and only talks to him after he talks to her. Genesis says that it is her decision not to talk to him. Sean argues that if she won't talk to him, he won't talk to her. Jason thinks that lines are being drawn in the house—Jason, Genesis, and Kameelah versus Sean, Syrus, Montana, and Elka. Genesis puts her thoughts on paper (known as "Genesisisms") and hangs them in the house. Syrus rips the "Genesisisms" down, irritating Jason, Kameelah and Genesis. Meanwhile, Syrus, Sean and Montana wonder why Genesis suddenly has so much to say when she just got done telling them she has nothing to say. Syrus and Sean place Jason's dirty dishes in his bed while he sleeps, and make a poster citing him as "Pig of the Day." Genesis retaliates with a sign of her own and yells at Sean over cleaning the loft.
116	17	"Honor Thy Father And Mother"	October 29, 1997
Elka misses her mom as Mother's Day approaches and confides in Genesis, talking about her mom's last night alive. Elka feels she has to take over her mother's duties as well as return to Brownsville for a style show dedicated to her mom. Montana says if it makes Elka uncomfortable, she does not have to go. Elka says she has to return someday, and it's going to hurt anyway. Elka flies to Brownsville and attends the style show. She accepts an award for their family. Dad tells Elka he is going to be Mr. Mom, and Elka shouldn't worry about them. Elka visits her mother’s grave and then returns to Boston. Meanwhile, Genesis talks to her mother about their rocky past and her bad childhood. When they talk a second time, Mom tells Genesis she has not eaten in a week. Genesis thinks her mother may be drinking again, but when her mother denies it, Genesis believes her. Later, however, her brother TJ calls with news that their mother was taken to the hospital for mixing pills with alcohol. Genesis cries alone in her room. Elka finds Genesis and comforts her, discussing her childhood. Genesis reveals that she was suicidal when she was younger. There was never any food in the house and her mom wasn't around. Genesis says that she doesn't want any child to go through what she did, and Elka agrees. Elka says she has to continue on as well, because her mom would have wanted her to carry on with her life.
117	18	"Leather Pants In Virgin Territory"	November 5, 1997
Anthony surveys the ASP youngsters on how the Real Worlders are doing. The youngsters suggest that the roommates don't listen to them and that they yell too much. Jason agrees with the comments but Montana takes it very personally. She wants to know how Anthony feels about their work. Anthony suggests that Montana is way too dramatic and is a busybody. Montana thinks she is being judged unfairly. Meanwhile, Sean and Jason grill Elka about Walter's upcoming visit. Elka is excited, but if the visit doesn't go well, she thinks their relationship will probably end. During Parents' Night at the ASP, Anthony announces that a group of the youngsters will attend a presidential summit in Philadelphia. Elka chooses not to attend because Walter is coming for his visit, and Jason chooses to stay behind with her. Anthony tells the Real Worlders that they will each be assigned one child and there can be no alcohol during the event. In Philadelphia, the group attends the summit, but Sean sleeps through President Clinton's speech. Later that night, Sean and Syrus leave their youngsters and go out with the college crowd to a bar and a party. The next morning, Sean and Syrus are nowhere to be found and Anthony has the group leave for the day without them.
118	19	"The English Rocker, the American Rapper, and the Renegade Redhead"	November 12, 1997
Anthony wonders where Sean and Syrus were the night before, but no one knows. Anthony feels that if they didn't want to participate, then they shouldn't have come at all. At a rally attended by Bill Clinton, Kameelah gets the ASP youngsters to meet LL Cool J. Sean and Syrus show up during the rally and Anthony lets them know how disappointed he is. The gang moves on to the Taste of Philly, where Sean and Montana drink alcohol in front of the children. Meanwhile, Elka and Walter are hanging out and go to church. Jason expresses concern to Timber about who Walter is. Timber thinks if Walter flew all the way to Boston, he must be dedicated to Elka. Walter and Elka have an emotional departure at Logan International. Upon arrival in Boston, Anthony suspends Sean, Montana and Syrus with no explanation. Anthony questions the three about the alcohol in Philly and clears Sean and Syrus but keeps Montana on suspension because she let the youngsters under her supervision also try alcohol. It becomes clear that Montana will be fired while Sean and Syrus can stay as long as they improve their performance. Montana feels bad about the situation but there is nothing she can do to change Anthony's mind.
119	20	"Homeless Is As Homeless Does"	November 19, 1997
Montana is depressed about being fired from the ASP and needs to redeem herself. She makes a series of phone calls, trying to set up volunteer work. She interviews at the Red Cross, but declines the job because of her blood phobia. Meanwhile, Kameelah and the others wonder whether Montana should be allowed to live in the loft since she was fired. They remember that Montana wanted to throw Syrus out when he was going to be fired and wonder if she should get the same treatment. Kameelah decides to drop the issue while Sean and Syrus joke with Montana about getting kicked out. Montana goes on interviews and finally gets a volunteer job she likes at Shelter, Inc. In other news, Sean and Syrus get their acts together at the ASP. Sean takes Syrus and Jason on a road trip to Maine to bring back a log so he can start a logrolling program for the youngsters. Syrus starts a basketball program.
120	21	"Black, White, And Sunburn All Over"	November 26, 1997
As the gang heads to vacation in Martha's Vineyard, it's obvious that there are two camps. While Jason, Genesis and Kameelah hitchhike around the island, Sean, Syrus and Montana play in the house with Elka, and have an old-time photo taken. Jason and Kameelah flirt heavily throughout the trip, including a "show me" session with Genesis where she sees a penis for the first time, Jason's. Meanwhile, tensions rise and boil over between Sean and Kameelah. Sean finds a nasty note written by Kameelah about Montana and him and calls her on it. Kameelah claims she accidentally left it out. Sean tells Jason that Kameelah is racist and compares her to Hitler. Calling him the "whitest of white boys," Kameelah feels Sean sees her only as a black person and not an individual. She is tired of representing Black America for Sean and eventually has it out with him. Sean feels Kameelah has put a wall up around her and he can't talk to her. Kameelah responds that she doesn't want Sean in her life.
121	22	"Turning to the Other Side"	December 3, 1997
The end is near and the roommates feel they haven't done a good job at the After School Program. So they all join together to work at the center. Kameelah enlists the help of Elka and Genesis to paint the main room while Syrus continues his basketball program. Sean teaches Aldo how to fly a radio-controlled airplane and Jason gets the youngsters to start journals. Anthony also asks Elka to produce a play for the youngsters to perform on Parent's Night. Meanwhile at Shelter Inc., Montana gets help from City Salon to give free haircuts to the women at the shelter. On the homefront, tension flares again between Montana and Kameelah, as well as between Montana and Elka. Montana feels the friendship between Elka and Kameelah is false, but Elka doesn't care for her opinion. Kameelah overhears Montana's aggressive confessional about her and calls Montana on it. When Elka wants to know who called her a "Drama Queen from Brownsville," Kameelah points to Montana, who denies it. Montana refuses to talk with Kameelah about the issue, telling Elka she wishes she never told her anything. Elka is offended, saying she thought they were friends. At the after-school program, parents' night and Elka's play are a huge success. Anthony brings the youngsters to the house for a surprise early-morning song and visit, where the roommates wake up to "Put a Little Love in Your Heart."
122	23	"Moving Out"	December 10, 1997
Sean manages to gather all the roommates for a final dinner at Artu's, where everything began six months ago. As their last day approaches, the cast cleans up their personal business. Montana and Elka call a truce and solidify their friendship while Genesis and Sean realize that they have just misunderstood each other the entire time. Jason and Kameelah assure Genesis she will be fine after she leaves Boston, and that they will call her soon. The gang has a tearful goodbye with the youngsters at the ASP, as well as goodbyes of their own at Logan International Airport.

This was the first season where a special preshow episode was also aired, documenting the months-long casting process.

== After filming ==
At the 2008 The Real World Awards Bash, Jason received a nomination in the "Hottest Male" category, Montana was in the running for "Best Phonecall Gone Bad", and Syrus for "Biggest Playa".

After meeting her on Road Rules: All Stars, Sean Duffy married Rachel Campos of The Real World: San Francisco, with whom he has nine children. He became district attorney for Ashland County, Wisconsin, and was elected to Congress in 2010. Due to their ninth baby's anticipated health complications, Duffy announced that he was resigning from Congress, in order to focus his time and attention on his family. Duffy was nominated for Secretary of Transportation by President Donald Trump for his second term. On January 28, 2025, Sean Duffy became the 20th United States Secretary of Transportation. In this position, he oversees 55,000 federal employees and is tasked with enforcing all aviation, highway, and railroad laws in the United States.

Syrus Yarbrough was featured in Eminem's video for "Without Me" in 2002 along with other Real World alumni Julie Stoffer and David "Puck" Rainey. He also appeared in the international film, Reservation. Yarbrough welcomed his first daughter on February 10, 2023.

Kameelah Phillips is a board-certified OB/GYN, practicing in New York City at Calla Women's Health.

Montana is an acupuncturist working in Encino, California.

=== The Challenge ===
This is the first season of The Real World whose entire cast has competed on The Real World/Road Rules Challenge.

Cast member	Seasons of The Challenge	Other appearances
Elka Walker	Battle of the Seasons (2002), The Gauntlet	—N/a
Jason Cornwell	Challenge	—N/a
Montana McGlynn	Challenge, The Gauntlet, The Gauntlet 2	—N/a
Genesis Moss	Battle of the Sexes, Battle of the Sexes 2	—N/a
Sean Duffy	Road Rules: All Stars, Battle of the Seasons (2002)	—N/a
Kameelah Phillips	Extreme Challenge	—N/a
Syrus Yarbrough	Extreme Challenge, Battle of the Sexes, The Inferno, The Gauntlet 2, The Ruins	The Challenge: All Stars (season 1), The Challenge: All Stars (season 3), The Challenge: All Stars (season 4)
