= Janet Petro =

11th Director of NASA's John F. Kennedy Space Center

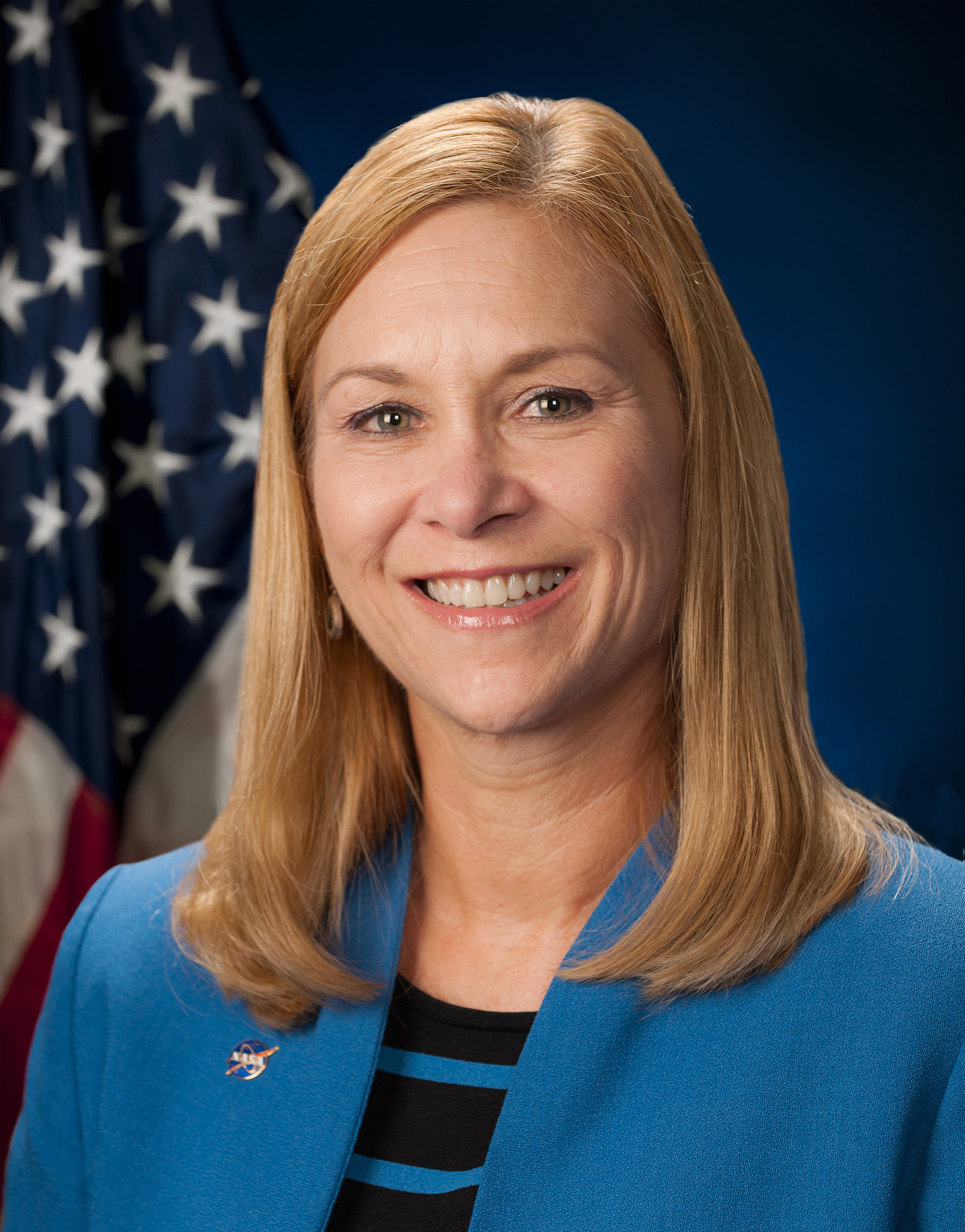
- Official portrait, 2015

Acting Administrator of the National Aeronautics and Space Administration
- In office January 20, 2025 – July 9, 2025
- President: Donald Trump
- Preceded by: Bill Nelson
- Succeeded by: Sean Duffy (acting)

11th Director of the Kennedy Space Center
- In office June 1, 2021 – May 1, 2026
- President: Joe Biden; Donald Trump
- Preceded by: Robert D. Cabana

Personal details
- Born: 1960 (age 65–66) Michigan, U.S.
- Education: United States Military Academy (BS); Boston University (MBA)

Military service
- Allegiance: United States
- Branch/service: United States Army

Janet E. Petro is an American former engineer and civil servant who served as the 11th director of the Kennedy Space Center (KSC) from 2021 until her retirement on May 1, 2026. From January 20 to July 9, 2025, Petro served as the acting administrator of NASA. When then-NASA administrator Bill Nelson appointed her KSC director on June 1, 2021, Petro became the first woman to hold that position. She later became the first woman to serve as acting NASA administrator upon assuming the role on January 20, 2025, following her appointment by President Donald Trump.

== Education and early life ==
Born in Michigan, Janet Petro's father moved the family to the Florida space coast when he received a job from NASA to work on the Kennedy Space Center's Mercury and Gemini Programs. She grew up in Satellite Beach and attended Surfside Elementary, DeLaura Middle, and Satellite High School. Janet Petro graduated in 1981 from the United States Military Academy at West Point, with a Bachelor of Science in engineering and was in the second class of graduates at West Point to include women. She also has an MBA from Boston University.

== Early career ==
Janet Petro began her career as a commissioned officer in the U.S. Army, upon graduation from the US Military Academy. While serving in the Army, she was assigned to the U.S Army's Aviation Branch, where she piloted helicopters and led troop assignments in Germany. She went on to work for Science Applications International Corporation in various management positions and McDonnell Douglas Aerospace Corporation, where she worked as a mechanical engineer and payload specialist before starting at NASA.

== Deputy Center Director ==
As Deputy Director of the John F. Kennedy Space Center, Janet Petro led in the transition of the center into a multi-user spaceport. For 12 months, she served an appointment at NASA's headquarters in Washington, D.C., as the deputy associate administrator and acting director for the Office of Evaluation. She was also the first woman to hold the position as deputy director.

== Director of Kennedy Space Center ==
Janet Petro became the 11th Center Director of KSC on June 1, 2021. Kelvin Manning served as the Acting Center Director while Petro was the Acting NASA Administrator from January to July 2025.

== Acting NASA Administrator ==
Petro's selection as acting administrator surprised some observers, as it bypassed Jim Free, NASA's Associate Administrator, who held the agency’s highest-ranking career civil servant position. She served as acting administrator from January 20, 2025, to July 9, 2025, when President Donald Trump appointed Transportation Secretary Sean Duffy as the new acting administrator.

As acting administrator, she eliminated the Diversity and Inclusion office, in compliance with an executive order by Donald Trump. She requested that employees report their colleagues for changing contract descriptions and threatened "adverse consequences" for employees who did not "report" violations.

She retired from NASA in May 2026.

== Awards ==
In 2018, Janet Petro was selected by the Florida Governor to be inducted into the Florida Women's Hall of Fame. In 2019 she was awarded the Samuel J. Heyman Service to America Sammies Management Excellence Medal. She is also the recipient of the President's Distinguished executive award, and the Silver Snoopy Award.

Government offices
Preceded by Bill Nelson	Administrator of the National Aeronautics and Space Administration; Acting; 2025	Succeeded by Sean Duffy; Acting
