= Pedro Zamora =

Cuban-American AIDS educator, activist and television personality (1972-1994)

- Born: Pedro Pablo Zamora y Díaz; February 29, 1972; Diezmero, San Miguel del Padrón, Havana, Cuba
- Died: November 11, 1994 (aged 22); Coconut Grove, Miami, Florida, U.S.
- Cause of death: AIDS-related progressive multifocal leukoencephalopathy
- Occupations: AIDS educator; activist; television personality
- Partner: Sean Sasser (1994)

Pedro Pablo Zamora (born Pedro Pablo Zamora y Díaz, February 29, 1972 – November 11, 1994) was a Cuban-American AIDS educator, activist, and television personality. As one of the first openly gay men with HIV/AIDS to be portrayed in popular media, Zamora brought international attention to HIV/AIDS issues and prejudice through his role on MTV's reality television series The Real World: San Francisco.

Zamora's romantic relationship with Sean Sasser was also documented on the show, and their relationship was later nominated by MTV viewers for "Favorite Love Story" award. The broadcast of their commitment ceremony in 1994, in which they exchanged vows, was the first such same-sex ceremony in television history, and is considered a landmark in the history of the medium.

U.S. President Bill Clinton credited Zamora with personalizing and humanizing those living with HIV—especially to Latino communities—with his activism, including his testimony before Congress. He is also honored annually by the MLB team, the Athletics. Zamora's personal struggle with AIDS, and his conflict with housemate David "Puck" Rainey is credited with helping to make The Real World a hit show, for which Time ranked it #7 on its 2011 list of "32 Epic Moments in Reality-TV History".

== Biography ==
=== 1972–1988: Early life ===
Pedro Zamora was born in Diezmero, San Miguel del Padrón, on the outskirts of Havana, Cuba, to Héctor Zamora, a food-warehouse worker, and Zoraida Díaz, a housewife. Zamora was their eighth and youngest child. Díaz had been told she could not have any more children, thus Zamora's birth on a leap day was seen as charmed. Héctor had fought in the Cuban Revolution for Fidel Castro, but became disillusioned with changes after Castro came to power. This earned him an unfavorable reputation with local informants. As a result, life became increasingly difficult for the Zamoras, who lived in a small house with a dirt floor. Zoraida traded on the black market for food.

In 1980, when Zamora was eight, his family left Cuba for the United States during the Mariel boatlift. After five days of processing in Cuba, the entire family was to board when, hours before boarding, Cuban officials ruled that his four older brothers were too close to draft age and had to remain. His oldest sister, a communist official, chose to stay. The older siblings insisted, over their parents' objections, to leave without them to give their younger siblings a better life. Zamora and his parents, his sister Mily, and his brother Jesús left in a boat filled with 250 people that had been built for half that number. The Zamoras settled in Hialeah, Florida, a suburb of Miami.

Zamora's mother died of skin cancer when he was 13. His older sister Mily helped raise him. Zamora focused on his schoolwork as a means of coping with his mother's death. He was an honor student, president of the Science Club, and captain of the cross country team. He excelled socially as well; his Hialeah High School classmates elected him as Most Intellectual and Best All-Around. He initially planned to become a doctor, as his mother's death had inspired him to study medicine.

Besides schoolwork, however, Zamora also engaged in promiscuous sex, in longing of affection he lost after his mother’s death. At 14, Zamora's father discovered that he had a boyfriend. His father was accepting of Zamora's homosexuality, but concerned about homophobia and its potential dangers. Although AIDS awareness was rising in America, Zamora was not educated about safe sex and AIDS prevention, as such things were not mentioned in school, with the exception of one guest lecture by a doctor who visited Zamora's class when he was in the seventh grade. According to Judd Winick's Pedro and Me, AIDS and its victims were characterized by the doctor as "deviants, drug addicts, prostitutes".

=== 1989–93: HIV-positive diagnosis and activism ===
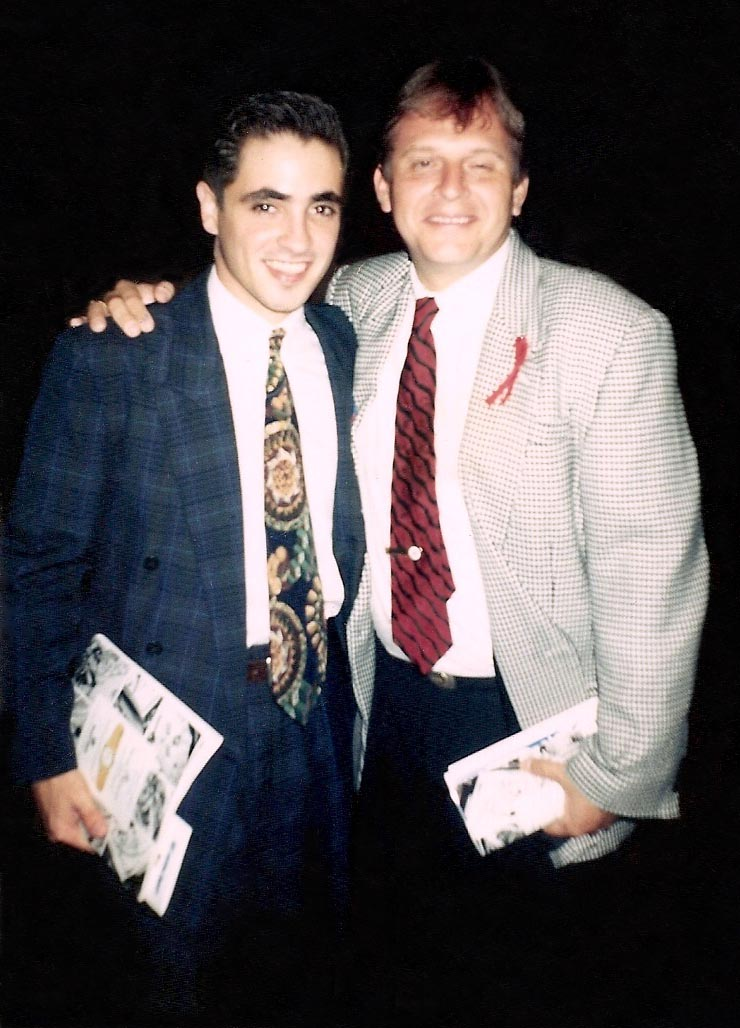
Pedro Zamora (left) with Alonso R. del Portillo in 1993

In late 1989, in his junior year of high school, 17-year-old Zamora donated blood during a Red Cross blood drive. A month later, he received a letter from the Red Cross informing him that his blood tested "reactive", though it did not specify for what. Zamora decided to be tested for HIV, and on November 9, 1989, the results confirmed he was HIV-positive.

His family was devastated but remained supportive. Zamora's goal was to graduate from high school before he died, and he did so in 1990. Five months later, he suffered a severe case of shingles. Upon recovery, Zamora joined a Miami-based HIV/AIDS resource center called Body Positive. There he met others with HIV and AIDS, learned more about the disease and how he could still have a fulfilling life. Soon thereafter, he began to talk about his condition to others, wanting to raise awareness in his community.

Zamora soon became a full-time AIDS educator. He lectured at schools for all ages, at PTA meetings, and in churches. In five years, he spoke nationwide hundreds of times, attended an international AIDS conference, and even served on the board of a charitable trust endowed by insurance companies—despite being denied insurance for himself. The constant travel exhausted Zamora, sometimes forcing him to cancel speaking engagements. In 1991, his work came to national attention when Eric Morganthaler wrote a front-page article about him for the Wall Street Journal. The publicity resulted in invitations to talk show interviews by Geraldo Rivera, Phil Donahue and Oprah Winfrey. On July 12, 1993, he testified before the United States Congress, arguing for more explicit HIV/AIDS educational programs, saying, "If you want to reach me as a young man, especially a young gay man of color, then you need to give me information in a language and vocabulary I can understand and relate to."

Zamora attended the 1993 Lesbian and Gay March on Washington, where he met Sean Sasser, also an AIDS educator, who would eventually become his partner. Sasser was moved by Zamora's presence and conviction, recalling, "I was kind of like, 'Wow.' I had never run across someone who was as good at it as he was." Sasser lived in San Francisco, and shortly after he had met Zamora, he had learned that producers of the MTV reality TV show The Real World were looking for an HIV positive person to cast in the 1994 season in San Francisco.

=== 1993–94: The Real World ===
Zamora sent an audition tape for the show, thinking that he could reach more people simply by the national exposure than by constant travel. Six months later, Zamora was cast on the show, beating out 25,000 applicants.

Zamora and his castmates (Mohammed Bilal, Rachel Campos, Pam Ling, Cory Murphy, David "Puck" Rainey, and Judd Winick) moved into the house at 953 Lombard Street on Russian Hill on February 12, 1994. The producers had informed the other six castmates that one person was HIV-positive, but did not specify whom. Once all of the castmates were in the house, Zamora informed them that it was he who was HIV-positive, showing them a scrapbook of his career as an AIDS educator. At the time, Ling was the only castmate with background on how HIV was transmitted, being a medical school student.

All of the castmates were receptive to Zamora, but Rachel Campos privately expressed (during the show's routine 'confessionals') her discomfort with Zamora's being HIV-positive. She was concerned how HIV would possibly affect her and the others in the house. She was afraid to bring up her concerns during the initial meeting, for fear of seeming intolerant. Thus, Campos initially distanced herself from Zamora, which Zamora interpreted as rejection.

Later, Zamora educated Campos about HIV and AIDS, which eased her apprehension. Despite very differing political views, they formed a rapport as the show progressed. On one episode, Campos brought Zamora to meet her Spanish-Mexican family in Arizona. By the season's end, however, Zamora expressed his disappointment to Campos that they did not become the close friends that they could have been.

Winick stated that Zamora had an almost "clairvoyant" ability to broach sensitive subjects. Despite Winick's never voicing it, Zamora sensed that Winick had lingering worries about sharing a room with him. Zamora educated Winick subtly through casual conversation, so much so that Winick did not even realize it. In later episodes, Winick, Ling, and Murphy often attended Zamora's lectures at schools in the Bay Area, wanting to learn more about HIV and AIDS.

During filming of the show, Zamora and Sean Sasser began dating, and quickly became a couple. Sasser eventually proposed to Zamora, and the two exchanged vows in a commitment ceremony held in the Real World house. In so doing, they made history as the first same-sex commitment ceremony on TV. Their relationship was nominated for "Favorite Love Story" at the 2008 Real Worlds Awards Bash.

Midway through filming, Zamora's health suddenly declined. He was suffering night sweats, bouts of pneumonia, fatigue, and weight loss. Producer Jon Murray stated, "He got sick much faster than he expected. That's when he made us promise to tell his story till the end." The stress of the perpetual conflict between Zamora and castmate Rainey was contributing to his decline. Rainey's antagonism towards Zamora included mocking his Cuban accent, dismissing Zamora's and Sasser's relationship, and multiple homophobic comments. Zamora announced he was moving out, as Rainey's antics had become intolerable. The other castmates unanimously agreed that they wanted Zamora to stay, and evicted Rainey. Time ranked this episode #7 on its list of "32 Epic Moments in Reality-TV History".

Zamora was able to participate in activities like parasailing during the cast's trip to Hawaii, giving viewers the impression that he was healthier than he actually was. The castmates knew he was unwell and often covered for him during their weekly confessional interviews, saying Zamora was doing fine when they knew otherwise.

=== 1994: After The Real World and death ===
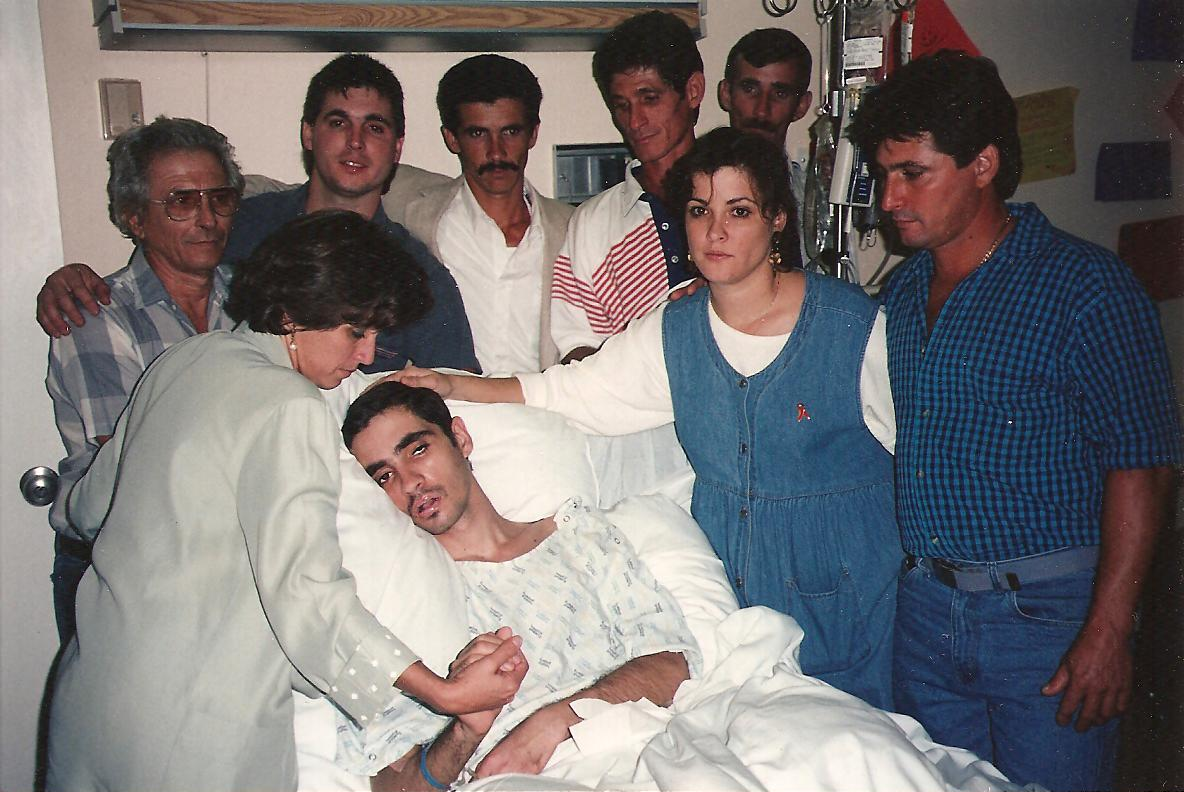
Pedro Zamora a few days before his death with his father and most of his siblings.

The cast vacated the Real World house on June 19, 1994, and the first episodes of The Real World: San Francisco began airing a week later. Zamora visited his family in Miami before returning to San Francisco to live with Sasser.

When Winick, Zamora, Murphy, and Ling met in August for a reunion party, Zamora was visibly ill. Once talkative, he was often silent, having difficulty following conversations, and forgetting familiar places. He went to the MTV offices in New York, and could not recognize where he was. On August 17, Zamora checked into St. Vincent's Hospital and was diagnosed with toxoplasmosis, a condition that causes brain lesions, fatigue, headaches and confusion. Further tests revealed he had progressive multifocal leukoencephalopathy (PML), a very rare and usually fatal viral inflammation of the brain that disrupts the electrical impulses of the nervous system. PML can dissipate on its own in patients with T-cell counts higher than 300–400. At the time, Zamora's T-cell count was 32. The inflammation was attacking the frontal lobe of his brain, causing his short-term memory loss. Zamora was given three to four months to live.

On September 3, about three weeks after checking into St. Vincent's, Zamora was flown to Mercy Hospital in Miami, and his family gathered around him. Then-President Bill Clinton called Zamora to thank him for his work. Zamora is said to have expressed elation and was able to respond, though Mily Zamora stated that whether he understood who was calling is unclear, given the severity of his PML.

As a gesture of gratitude for his work, Clinton asked if there was anything he could do for the Zamora family. They replied that they wanted Zamora's remaining siblings in Cuba to be with him in his final days. This resulted in Alonso R. del Portillo, Attorney General Janet Reno, Secretary of Health and Human Services Donna Shalala, and Florida Congresswoman Ileana Ros-Lehtinen forming an agreement with Cuba that would admit 20,000 Cubans per year to the United States. Zamora's three brothers and their families arrived in the next couple of weeks, reuniting the family for the first time in 14 years.

On October 21, Winick announced that MTV had set up a trust fund in order to pay for Zamora's medical costs, as Zamora had no medical insurance. He had received Medicaid, but was rejected for any private company coverage due his pre-existing condition of HIV.

Before his hospitalization, Zamora told his family to not keep him alive by artificial means—his mother had a prolonged death, and he wanted to spare his family that pain. Zamora developed a high fever. Once he became unresponsive, his family honored his wishes and withdrew life support. Surrounded by his family, longtime friend Alex Escarano, Sasser, Winick, and Ling, Zamora died at 4:40 a.m. EST on November 11, 1994, at the age of 22, hours after the final episode of The Real World: San Francisco aired. He was buried on November 13.

== Legacy and tributes ==
After his death, Zamora was publicly praised by President Clinton and Donna Shalala for his leadership and work in educating high school students, saying that through his appearance on The Real World, Pedro had become a part of viewers' families, and that all people who watched the show could now say that they knew someone who had lived with AIDS.

MTV broadcast A Tribute to Pedro Zamora, a special memorial program, in Zamora's honor.

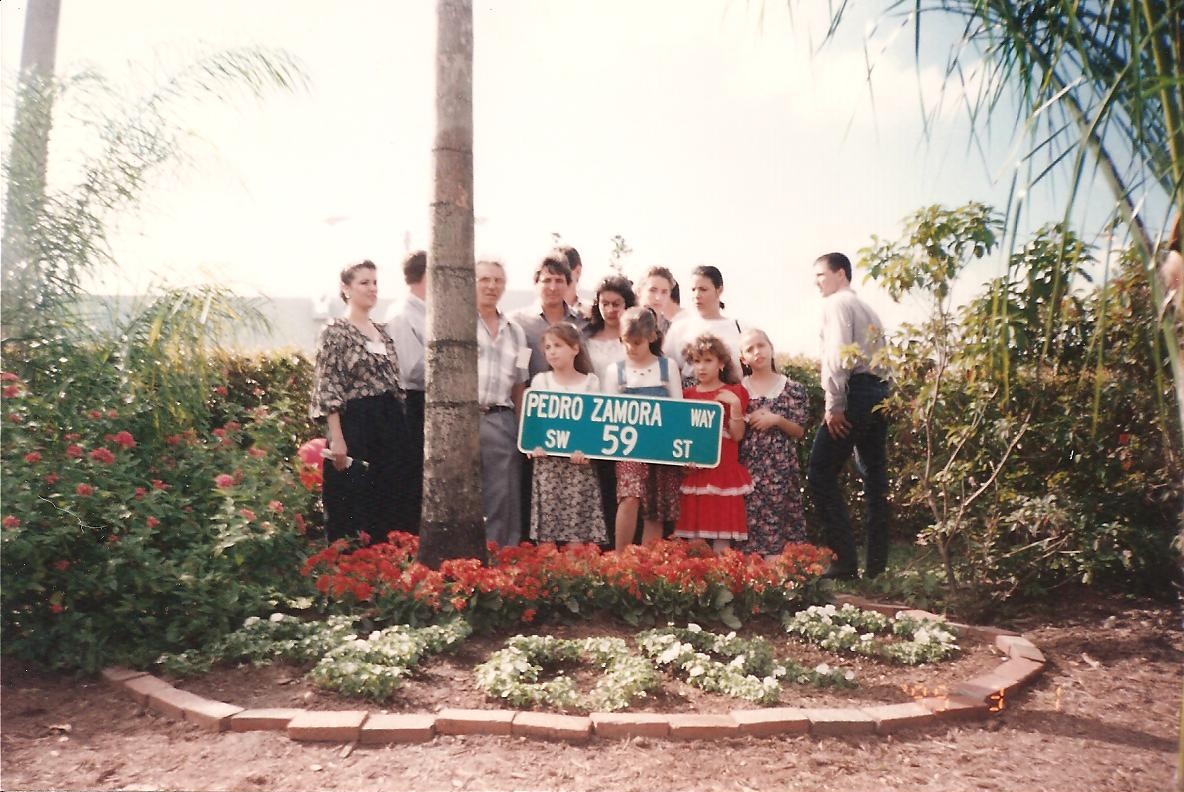
Zamora's family at the dedication of Pedro Zamora Way and the Pedro Zamora Garden on March 1, 1995

On February 28, 1995, the portion of the street in front of McMillan Middle School in Miami was renamed Pedro Zamora Way in a ceremony attended by Zamora's father and sister Mily.

A number of organizations were created in Pedro's name, including:

- National Pedro Zamora Foundation, which was founded by Winick, Ling, Mily Zamora, and Sasser (All four founders later distanced themselves from the foundation due to conflicts with its president, Brian Quintana).
- The Pedro Zamora Memorial Fund, created by the AIDS Action Foundation
- The Pedro Zamora Youth HIV Clinic
- The Pedro Zamora Public Policy Fellowship

Mily Zamora became a public speaker about AIDS. Winick continued lecturing on behalf of Zamora for three years. His autobiographical graphic novel, Pedro and Me: Friendship, Loss, and What I Learned, was published in September 2000. It was nominated for the 2001 Eisner Award for Best Graphic Album: New, won a 2001 American Library Association Stonewall Book Award for Non-Fiction Honor Books, and the GLAAD Media Award for Outstanding Comic. It has been incorporated into school curricula across the country, such as UCLA, which made it its common book in 2013. Winick's experiences with Zamora would also help shape his work in mainstream superhero comics, which would receive considerable media attention for storylines in Green Lantern and Green Arrow, which explored gay or AIDS-related themes.

Ling went on to devote her medical research to HIV and AIDS.

Pedro's partner, Sean Sasser, continued his activism for LGBT issues, and his work as an HIV educator. In 1995, he spoke at the inaugural White House AIDS conference, and was appointed by President Clinton to the Presidential Advisory Council on HIV/AIDS. He became a pastry chef in Atlanta, Portland, and finally Washington, DC., at RIS restaurant. In June 2013 Sasser married Michael Kaplan, whom he had dated off and on after Zamora's death, and with whom he had moved in six months prior. While in Washington, Sasser served as a board member of the AIDS Alliance for Children, Youth and Families. He was active in youth and mentoring organizations, and he and Kaplan served as foster parents to a four-year-old girl. In July 2013, Sasser, who had also been HIV positive for 25 years, was diagnosed with mesothelioma, a rare cancer of the lungs. He died at his home on August 7, 2013, at the age of 44.

Queer theorist José Esteban Muñoz dedicated a chapter to Zamora in his 1999 book Disidentifications: Queers of Color and the Performance of Politics. In the chapter titled, "Pedro Zamora's Real World of Counterpublicity: Performing Ethics of Self," Muñoz describes the ways in which Zamora used the shows' confessional booth to perform an ethics of self, and in doing so disidentified with the mainstream.

In 2008, Bunim-Murray Productions produced a film, Pedro, directed by Nick Oceano, dramatizing Zamora's life. The film was an Official Selection at the 2008 Toronto International Film Festival, and was Bunim-Murray's first scripted project. Zamora was portrayed by Alex Loynaz.

In 2009, the National AIDS Memorial Grove in San Francisco began the Youth Essay Scholarship Program, renamed the Pedro Zamora Young Leaders Scholarship in 2014. Every August, the scholarship program gives awards ranging from $2,500 to $5,000 to high school seniors and college students who are actively fighting HIV/AIDS through public service and leadership.

In June 2019, Zamora was one of the inaugural fifty American "pioneers, trailblazers, and heroes" inducted on the National LGBTQ Wall of Honor within the Stonewall National Monument (SNM) in New York City's Stonewall Inn. The SNM is the first U.S. national monument dedicated to LGBTQ rights and history, while The Wall's unveiling was timed to take place during the 50th anniversary of the Stonewall riots.

A 2021 documentary by William T. Horner, Keep the Cameras Rolling: The Pedro Zamora Way, chronicles Zamora's status as an AIDS patient and a reality television personality.
