= Road Rules: All Stars =

1st season of reality television series

- Season 1
- Starring: Cynthia Roberts; Eric Nies; Jon Brennan; Rachel Campos; Sean Duffy
- Presented by: David "Puck" Rainey
- Location: Montreal; Lake Placid; Wellington; Auckland; Los Angeles
- No. of episodes: 5

Release
- Original network: MTV
- Original release: April 20 – May 18, 1998

Season chronology
- Next → Challenge

Road Rules: All Stars is the first season of the MTV reality game show, The Challenge. Unlike later seasons, the show followed alumni of The Real World as they went on a typical Road Rules-type adventure around the United States in a non-competitive format. It is the only season without the term Challenge in its title. The season premiered on April 20, 1998.

== Format ==
Much like the original format of Road Rules, five alumni from past seasons of The Real World were brought together to participate in a series of missions as they traveled across the United States and New Zealand in a Winnebago. Unlike following seasons of Real World/Road Rules Challenge, this season only consisted of cast members from The Real World, and was made up of a much smaller cast. Again as with Road Rules, all of the cast's cash and credit cards were confiscated for the duration of the series, and if the participants completed all the assignments, they would win a "handsome reward". At the end of the series, each cast member won a trip to Costa Rica.

== Cast ==
Mr. Big: David "Puck" Rainey from The Real World: San Francisco

Cast member	Original season
Cynthia Roberts	The Real World: Miami
Eric Nies	The Real World: New York
Jon Brennan	The Real World: Los Angeles
Rachel Campos	The Real World: San Francisco
Sean Duffy	The Real World: Boston

== Tasks ==
- Prove Existence of Ghosts (Monroe, Connecticut): The cast must spend the night in an abandoned mental hospital and prove that there are ghosts living in there.
- Sheep Shearing/Cow Milking (Wellington, New Zealand): The first part of the task has the cast gathering a herd of sheep, holding them down and then shearing their wool. The second part of the task has the women milking cows via a special machine that sucks out the milk.
- Fly by Wire (Wellington): Each of the castmates will have to fly on a fan-propelled rocket that is attached to a wire between two mountains.
- Zorbing (Auckland, New Zealand): Each of the castmates face off against each other in giant hamster balls and race down a steep hill. The winner will be given $150.
- Urban Rap (Auckland): The cast are tasked to jump down the side of a building, wearing a harness. The mission is only considered complete if everyone participates.
- Hot Dog on a Stick (Los Angeles, California): The cast have to work a full day at "Hot Dog on a Stick".
- Cook Off (Los Angeles): The men and women compete against each other in a "cook off" and have two hours to present the other team a meal.
- Improv Performers (Los Angeles): The cast are instructed to act in an improv performance called "Cookin' with Gas".
- Record a Song (Los Angeles): The cast were instructed several days prior to write a theme song for Road Rules: All Stars and are instructed that they will all be recording the song.

== Game summary ==
Episode		Result
#	Challenge	Result
1	Prove Existence of Ghosts	Completed
2	Sheep Shearing/Cow Milking	Completed
2	Fly By Wire	Completed
3	Zorbing	Completed
4	Urban Rap	Completed
4	Hot Dog on a Stick	Completed
4	Cook Off	Completed
5	Improv Performers	Completed
5	Record a Song	Completed

=== Final results ===
- Each cast member won a trip for two to San José, Costa Rica.

== Episodes ==
No. overall	No. in season	Title	Original release date
1	1	"Five Easy Pieces"	April 20, 1998
Five The Real World alumni gather together to travel across the world for a handsome reward. The castmates were given enough money for nine days and the keys to the winnebago. Rachel and Sean connect instantly and begin to flirt. The castmates are given their first clue from The Real World: San Francisco alumnus David "Puck" Rainey and drive to Connecticut where they meet two demonologists and are informed that they will have to spend the night in a supposedly haunted mental hospital. During their mission, the boys decide to play a prank on the girls by pretending to be ghosts. It's later revealed that they did catch a ghost on camera and have completed their mission.
2	2	"Shear Madness"	April 27, 1998
The castmates head to New Zealand for their next mission where they receive a clue that they will be going to a sheep farm. Rachel opens up about her accident as things continue to heat up between her and Sean. The castmates stop to get breakfast and arrive at their mission an hour late. They're immediately put to work: sheep shearing. The girls are assigned to milk cows which they complete and manage to make up for the time loss. The castmates are paid and are told they won't be getting any money for another twelve days. Sean gets annoyed when the rest of the cast go out to eat. Eric begins to gain the ire of some of his castmates for his personality. The castmates are given their next clue and are told to drive outside Wellington to participate in "Fly By Wire", which they complete.
3	3	"A Radish In A Salad Spinner"	May 4, 1998
The cast are given their next clue where they're told to write a new theme song for Road Rules. Eric chose to isolate himself from the project because he was afraid it would conflict with his record deal contract. The cast drive to a field to compete against each other in a sport called "zorbing". During the mission, Jon gets hurt, but turns out to be fine. When it comes down to Rachel and Cynthia to compete against each other, Cynthia bows out, allowing Rachel to win $150. Eric gets into a fight with Cynthia, Rachel, and Sean when he wants to stay. Cynthia and Rachel get into an argument over Eric and Cynthia's alleged "connection" in Connecticut. When the cast arrives in Auckland, Eric tries to make amends by suggesting they go horseback riding.
4	4	"How To Eat Fried Worms..."	May 11, 1998
The cast arrive into town where they are told that they will be jumping off the side of a building. Cynthia is terrified to jump, but does it anyway. The cast are given their next clue and are told they will be going to Los Angeles next. They head over to The Real World: Los Angeles alumna Beth Stolarczyk's house to rest before receiving their next clue which is working at "Hot Dog on a Stick". Rachel initially refuses to wear the uniform because she finds it embarrassing, but agrees to do it for the good of the team. Their next clue tells them they will have a cook off. That night at Beth's place, Beth begins making advances at Sean, but he doesn't give in. The men face off against the women in the cook off. The guys cook up insects in their meal, which they serve to the girls and when they reveal the ingredients, Cynthia gets really upset and wants to leave the show.
5	5	"Fresh Squeezed Creative Juices"	May 18, 1998
The morning after, Cynthia decides that she is going to stay. The castmates meet with actress Mindy Sterling and she teaches them how to perform improvisation. After performing their comedy routine, the cast are instructed to play parodies of their old The Real World cast members. Other actors present in the performance include Jennifer Coolidge and Cheryl Hines. Their next clue has them recording the song they were told to write a while ago. They meet with a recording producer to record the song. Sean initially becomes embarrassed by his lack of singing talent, but manages to pull through and complete the mission. The cast go out to party, and Rachel and Sean hook up. Their final clue tells them they will be taken by limo to their handsome reward. Puck arrives on the scene to drop off their handsome reward, which is a paid trip for two to San José, Costa Rica. Sean and Rachel affirm their attraction to each other. The episode ends with the cast reflecting on their adventure together and the full theme song that they wrote together.
