= Pedro and Me =

2000 autobiographical graphic novel by Judd Winick

Pedro and Me: Friendship, Loss and What I Learned
- Book front cover
- Author: Judd Winick
- Language: English
- Genre: Autobiographical
- Publisher: Henry Holt and Company/New York
- Publication date: September 2000
- Publication place: United States
- Pages: 187
- ISBN: 0-8050-6403-6
- OCLC: 42429252
- Dewey Decimal: 362.1/969792/0092 21
- LC Class: RC607.A26 W5726 2000

Pedro and Me is an autobiographical graphic novel by Judd Winick regarding his friendship with AIDS educator Pedro Zamora after the two met while on the reality television series The Real World: San Francisco. It was published in September 2000.

== Awards ==
Pedro and Me won numerous awards such as:

- GLAAD Media Award for Best Comic Book
- Publishers Weekly Best Book (2000)
- Bay Area Book Reviewers Award for Best in Children's Literature (2000)
- Eisner Nomination for Best Original Graphic Novel (2000)
- Robert F. Sibert Informational Book Honor Award (2001)
- Notable Children's Book Selection, American Library Association (2001)
- American Library Association Gay, Lesbian, Bisexual, Transgender Roundtable Nonfiction Honor book
- YALSA (Young Adult Library Services Association) Quick Pick for Reluctant Readers>
- YALSA Notable Graphic Novels
- Bulletin Blue Ribbon Book
- America's Award for Children's and Young Adult Literature Highly Recommended List (Award sponsored by the national Consortium of Latin American Studies Programs—CLASP)
