= Rachel Campos-Duffy =

American television personality (born 1971)

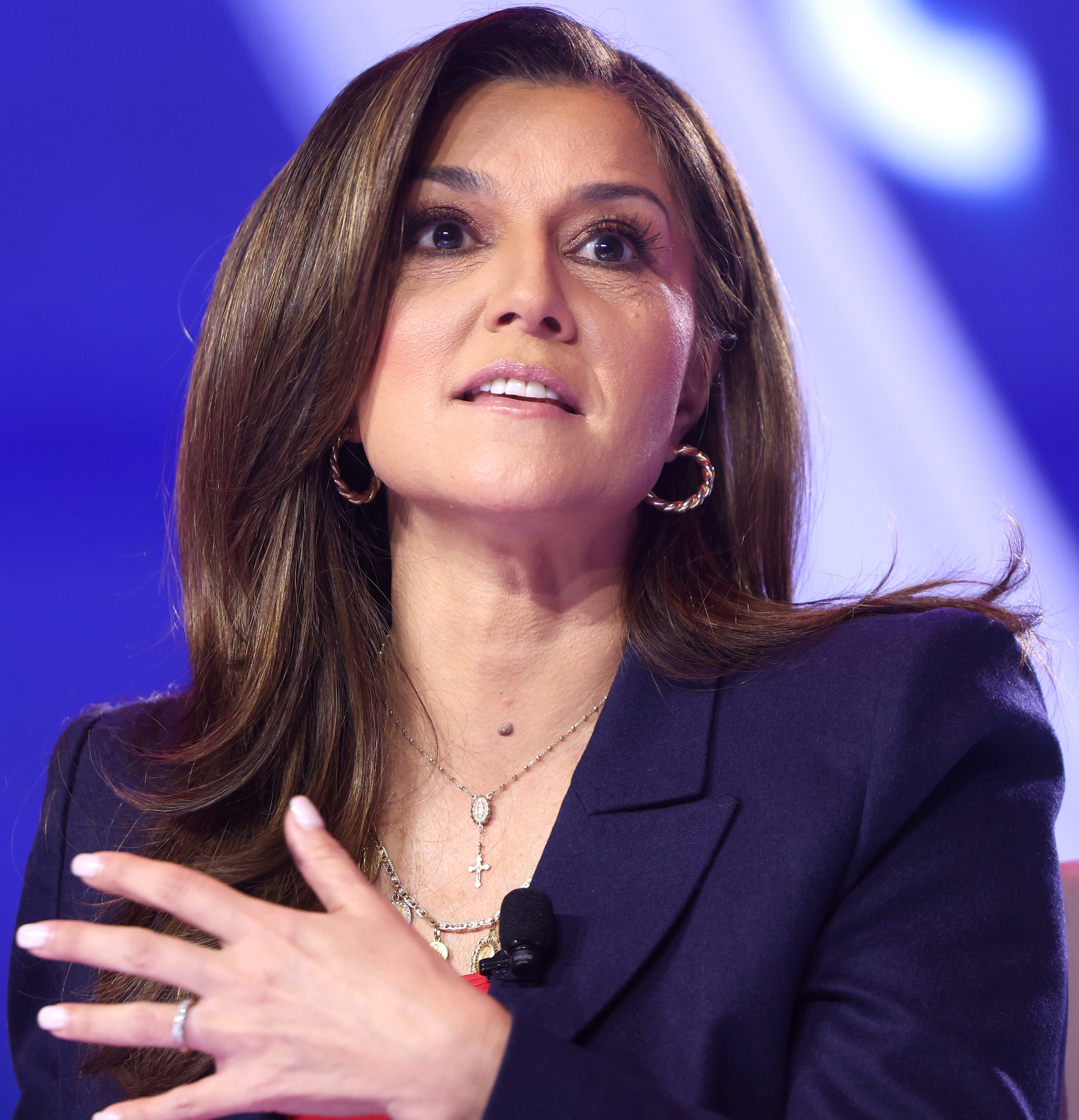
- Campos-Duffy in 2025
- Born: Rachel Campos; October 22, 1971 (age 55); Tempe, Arizona, U.S.
- Education: Arizona State University (BS); University of California, San Diego (MIA)
- Occupation: Television personality
- Years active: 1994–present
- Spouse: Sean Duffy (m. 1999)
- Children: 9
- Relatives: Leah Campos (sister); Michael Alfonso (son-in-law)

Rachel Campos-Duffy (née Campos; born October 22, 1971) is an American conservative television personality. She first appeared on television in 1994 as a cast member on the MTV reality television series The Real World: San Francisco, before moving on to work as a television host. She was a guest host on the ABC talk show The View, before moving to Fox News, where she has guest-hosted the show Outnumbered before being hired as a permanent co-host on Fox & Friends Weekend in May 2021.

== Early life ==
Rachel Campos was born and raised in Tempe, Arizona; her parents, Miguel Campos and Maria del Pilar, were junior high school teachers in Chandler, Arizona. Her paternal grandparents immigrated to the United States from Mexico. Her mother is an immigrant from Spain. She has two brothers, Patrick Campos and Joseph Campos. Her sister, Leah, is a former CIA operations officer who ran for the U.S. Congress in Arizona in 2012. Campos and her siblings were raised in a strict Catholic home.

Campos graduated from Seton Catholic High School. She graduated from Arizona State University with a degree in economics. She was awarded the Woodrow Wilson Graduate Fellowship, which she had planned to use to attend graduate school, with the goal of being a college professor. Campos earned a master's degree in international affairs from the University of California, San Diego.

== Career ==
=== The Real World: San Francisco ===
Campos was cast on The Real World: San Francisco in January 1994, and lived in the house on Russian Hill in San Francisco with her six housemates from February 12 to June 19. The season premiered on July 6, 1994.

Although the castmates were informed ahead of time that they would be living with someone who was HIV-positive, they were not informed which housemate it would be. On the cast's first night in the house, Campos’ housemate, AIDS educator Pedro Zamora, informed the housemates that he had AIDS by showing them his scrapbook of his career as an HIV educator. Although Campos initially felt uncomfortable and distanced herself from Zamora out of health concerns, the two eventually became friends, with Zamora traveling to Arizona with Campos to visit her family. During her time on the series, she had both a romantic relationship and tumultuous friendship with housemate David "Puck" Rainey. Fellow cast member Judd Winick attributed this attraction on her part to her taste for rebellious men, or "bad boys". Campos conceded this, and admitted that she was sometimes an initial bad judge of character, and too trusting. Campos' friendship with Rainey eventually dissolved, as did Rainey's friendship with the rest of the cast, resulting in his eviction. Campos subsequently became best friends with Rainey's replacement, Joanna Rhodes, and the two of them were referred to by Winick as "high maintenance twins."

On the show and in MTV's promotional materials for the show, Campos was depicted as a passionate Republican, whose heroes included Jack Kemp, and as a Roman Catholic, though she conceded her strict religious upbringing fostered within her a rebellious streak that sometimes brought her into conflict with her parents. Her political viewpoints led to conflict with her housemates on more than one occasion, as when Mohammed Bilal ridiculed the Republican housing ideas that she expressed in Episode 3.

In 1998 Campos taped Road Rules: All Stars, along with alumni of other past Real World seasons, such as Sean Duffy of The Real World: Boston cast, whom she would later marry.

Campos-Duffy was one of ten Real World alumni who starred in the 2003 film The Wedding Video, a Real World parody centered on the wedding of first season alumnus Norman Korpi.

=== The View ===
Campos tried out three times for a co-host spot on the daytime television talk show The View. After Debbie Matenopoulos left the show in 1999, Campos competed in an on-air try-out with Lisa Ling and Lauren Sánchez; Ling was eventually hired. After Ling's departure in 2002, Campos—who by then held her own "coffee talk" show with other Wisconsin housewives—again competed in a week-long on-air try-out, this time against Erin Hershey Presley and Elisabeth Hasselbeck. In November 2003, Hasselbeck was hired to replace Ling. In July 2013, when Hasselbeck left The View to replace Gretchen Carlson as the female co-host of Fox & Friends, Campos once again tried out but Jenny McCarthy was hired to fill the spot.

=== Fox News ===
On June 21, 2018, during an appearance on the Fox News program The Ingraham Angle, Campos-Duffy defended the Trump administration's controversial practice of separating immigrant families arrested crossing the US border. Speaking of the facilities where the children were housed, she said, "The detention centers are far safer than the journey that these children just came on, and I will say this...people aren't stupid. I spoke to some African-Americans who say, 'Gosh, the conditions of the detention centers are better than some of the projects that I grew up in.'" The comments drew immediate criticism, including from Vox reporter Jane Coaston, New York Times Magazine writer Nikole Hannah-Jones, Britni Danielle of Essence magazine, and filmmaker Ava DuVernay.

In May 2021, Campos-Duffy was hired as a permanent co-host on Fox & Friends Weekend.

On August 22, 2021, Campos-Duffy criticized President Joe Biden for the Taliban retaking of Afghanistan, blaming his "mental state" for the event. She also blamed First Lady Jill Biden, EdD, saying that she failed the country by allowing her husband to run for president. Jill Biden's press secretary, Michael LaRosa, responded the following day, calling the comments "disgusting" and saying that "[Campos-Duffy and Fox News] know better. They can do better and their viewers deserve better. I hope they'll apologize to the First Lady and leave this kind of talk in the [trash] where it belongs."

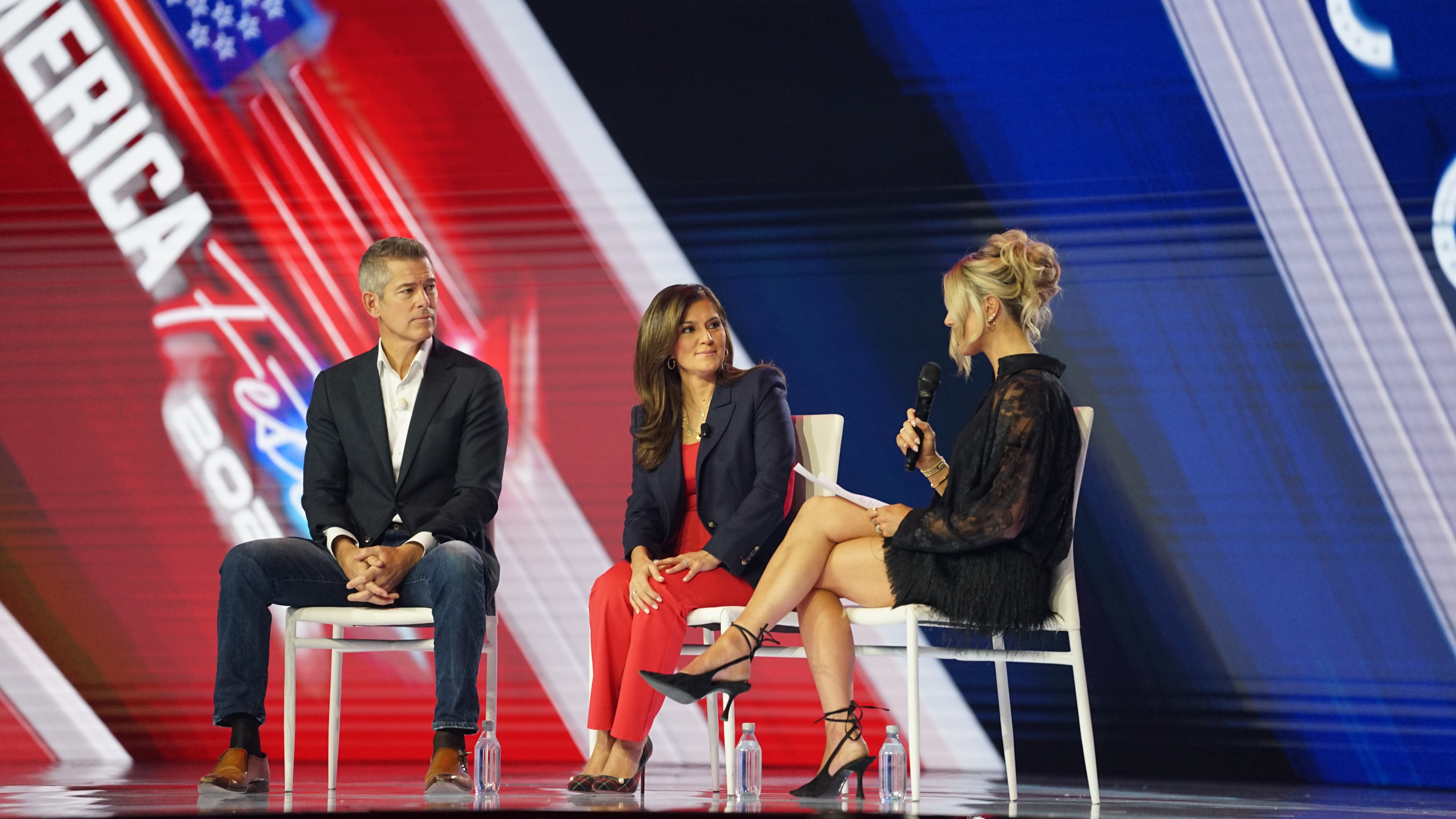
Sean Duffy, Campos-Duffy at AmericaFest 2025

Campos-Duffy has been criticised for making various incorrect and controversial statements about Ukraine, and along with other Fox presenters has been criticised for pushing false Russian naratives on the war On March 14, 2022, Campos-Duffy stated that the United States provoked Russia's invasion of Ukraine the month prior, a point with which her co-host, Brian Kilmeade, disagreed. In 2026, she claimed that Ukraine had killed 1 million Russian children. She also defended Donald Trump's decisions to break sanctions on Russia and to approve American purchases of Russian diesel, and blamed the President of Ukraine, Zelenskyy for dashing hopes of peace by attacking Russian oil refineries. She has also said that the conflict started because of western Europe's actions, rather than Russia's.

=== Activism and advocacy ===
Campos-Duffy is the national spokesperson for The LIBRE Initiative, a non-profit organization whose stated mission is to promote ideas about constitutionally limited government, property rights, rule of law, economic stability, and free market capitalism to the Hispanic community.

Campos-Duffy supported Scott Walker in the Republican primary for the 2016 presidential election.

== Personal life ==
After her stint on The Real World ended, Campos was involved in a head-on car collision after the driver of an oncoming vehicle fell asleep at the wheel. Campos' boyfriend and his friend, who was driving their rented car, died in the crash. Campos was thrown out of the passenger-side window and sustained serious injuries to her right leg that caused long-term problems such as arthritis, a limp, and difficulty running.

Campos married her Road Rules: All Stars costar Sean Duffy. They lived in Ashland, Wisconsin, where Duffy was the District Attorney of Ashland County. In 2011, Duffy became a Republican member of Congress for the 7th district of Wisconsin. The Duffys moved from Ashland to Weston, Wisconsin in late 2011, and in 2013, they moved to Wausau, Wisconsin, so that Sean would be closer to an airport for his weekly commute to Washington, D.C. where he spent three or four days a week.

In 2008, Campos-Duffy revealed that she suffered two miscarriages. As of May 2016, they had eight children. The Duffys' ninth child, a daughter, was born in 2019. She was born one month early and has Down syndrome. Due to the baby's anticipated health complications, including a heart condition, Sean Duffy announced that he was resigning from Congress, effective September 23, 2019, in order to focus his time and attention on his family.

== In popular culture ==
In Pedro, Nick Oceano's 2008 film dramatizing Pedro Zamora's life, Campos-Duffy is portrayed by Karolin Luna.

== Filmography ==
- The Real World: San Francisco (1994)
- The Real World Vacations: Behind the Scenes (1995) Hostess
- The Real World Reunion (1995)
- The Real World Reunion: Inside Out (1996)
- The Real World You Never Saw (1997)
- Road Rules: All Stars (1998)
- The Real World You Never Saw: Boston + Seattle (1998)
- The Real World Reunion 2000 (2000)
- The Real World Movie: The Lost Season (2002)
- The Wedding Video (2003)
- The View – Episode: November 4 (2003) Guest Co-Host
- The View – Episode: October 12 (2009) Guest Co-Host
- The View – Episode: March 5 (2014) Guest Co-Host
- The View – Episode: March 6 (2014) Guest Co-Host
