= David Rainey =

American reality television personality

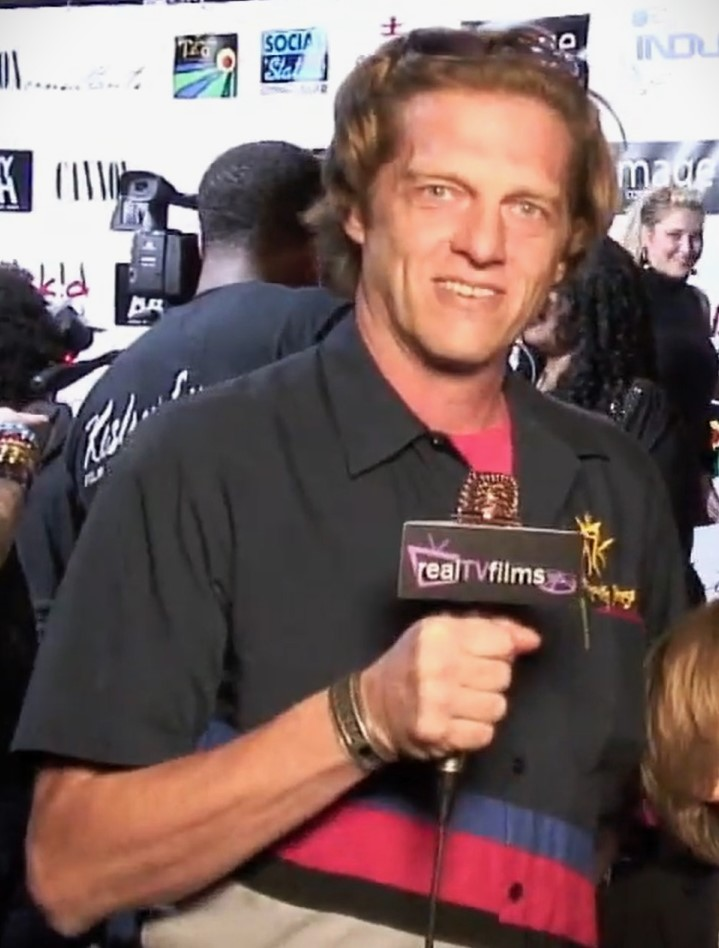
- Rainey in 2010
- Born: 1968 (age 57–58); Oakland, California, U.S.
- Other name: Puck
- Occupation: Reality television personality
- Spouse: Betty Rainey
- Children: 3

David "Puck" Rainey (born 1968) is an American reality television personality who gained fame as a cast member on The Real World: San Francisco in 1994. A bicycle messenger during the show's shooting, he became notorious as the second Real World cast member ever to be evicted from the house, due to his increasingly antagonistic relationship with his housemates, especially with Pedro Zamora, an HIV-positive AIDS educator. Rainey's conflict with Zamora is credited with helping make The Real World a hit show, for which Time ranked it #7 on their list of "32 Epic Moments in Reality-TV History". TV Guide included him in their 2013 list of The 60 Nastiest Villains of All Time.

== Early life ==
Rainey was born in Oakland, California and raised in the San Francisco Bay Area. He has characterized his mother as a "hippie". He and his sister are of partial Swedish descent through their grandfather.

== The Real World ==
Rainey was a cast member on the MTV reality TV series The Real World: San Francisco in 1994. He and his castmates moved into the house at 953 Lombard Street on Russian Hill on February 12 of that year. Among the cast, Rainey was an eccentric center of attention. In the season premiere he arrived at the house last because he was detained by police for a traffic incident. He incurred many minor injuries while bike riding, and kept photos of them, which he showed to his housemates. Although the producers informed the housemates that they would be living with someone who was HIV-positive, they did not reveal who it was, and as a result of these injuries, which included scabs on his face, some of the other castmates incorrectly assumed the HIV-positive cast member was Rainey. Rainey clashed with his roommates over his hygiene, as when Pedro Zamora complained that he used his finger to scoop peanut butter from a jar after he had used that finger to pick his nose. His roommate Mohammed Bilal complained that Rainey tended to not change his socks, but instead covered his feet with more socks to mask the smell, which Bilal contended did not work. His housemates also complained of his lack of consideration for others, and his need to monopolize conversation. Rainey's housemate, Judd Winick, who is Jewish, was also offended at Rainey's wearing of a T-shirt that depicted four guns arranged in the shape of a swastika, and his refusal to accede to Winick's request not to wear the shirt (though this confrontation was only revealed in The Real World Diaries, a book published by MTV, and depicted in the 2009 film Pedro, not the series itself).

One of Rainey's closest relationships in the house was with Rachel Campos. Although their relationship became romantic when they kissed on three occasions, it eventually dissolved when, during a heated argument, he revealed this to the other housemates, despite having promised her he would not. Although the others were not surprised at this revelation, Campos saw this as a betrayal of trust.

Rainey's most contentious relationship was with Zamora. Rainey denigrated Zamora's career as an AIDS educator and mocked his Cuban accent. Winick described Rainey as "obnoxious and homophobic." Zamora, who had AIDS, distanced himself from Rainey, and thereby from the other housemates, fearing the stress of his relationship with Rainey was affecting his health. When Zamora threatened to move out, the other housemates voted to evict Rainey instead. Rainey later appeared in subsequent episodes in which he encountered former housemates Cory Murphy, Campos, and Winick, but their meetings typically ended in conflict. In the season finale, he phoned Campos just before she left the house and accused his ex-roommates of harboring ill feelings towards him, calling them "judases'".

During The Real World Reunion in 1995, which assembled the casts of the first four seasons of The Real World, Rainey resumed his conflict with his former housemates, including Bilal and Winick, as well as cast members from other seasons. Following Winick's encouragement to the audience to get involved in fighting the AIDS epidemic, and his statement that Zamora's recent death made his decision to attend the reunion difficult, Rainey claimed that he too used his time to help AIDS patients. Winick countered by stating that Rainey had reacted to Zamora's death with the remark "Good riddance". Rainey denied this, and cast various aspersions on Winick and cast members present before temporarily leaving the taping.

At the 2008 The Real World Awards Bash, Pedro and Puck received a nomination for "Best Fight", Rainey was also nominated in the "Roommate You Love to Hate" and in the "Gone Baby Gone" categories.

== Other appearances ==
Rainey made a cameo appearance in 1998 on Road Rules: All Stars and Celebrity Deathmatch, and competed in 2003 on Battle of the Sexes, during which he came into conflict with David Edwards of The Real World: Los Angeles, and married (on-camera) Betty Garcia, his fiancée and mother of his son, Bogart. He also made an appearance in Eminem's video for "Without Me".

Rainey appeared on the February 19, 2003 episode of MTV Cribs.

Rainey had been cast to appear on the 2008 season of Celebrity Rehab with Dr. Drew, but left before filming began.

== Personal life ==
Rainey met his future wife, Betty, at a farmers market in 1998. They had a son, and later married on Real World/Road Rules Challenge: Battle of the Sexes. They later had a second son, Rocco. In 2006, he, his wife and their two children were living in the Los Angeles area, where Rainey worked as a truck driver. Rainey made a living through public appearances and miscellaneous jobs. In his spare time he was gardening and modeling, with his partner working behind the camera. As of 2009 he had a third child with his wife. He also stated that he had fathered four other children with lesbian women. As of that year, he was living on a farm in Neenach, California, raising chickens and vegetables, racing four-wheeled ATVs, and living "off-the-grid".

=== Legal troubles ===
In 2003, Rainey was arrested for domestic violence but the charges were dropped. In 2009, Rainey was sentenced to a year in a Los Angeles County jail after pleading no contest to charges of committing battery upon his girlfriend. That same year, he also pleaded no contest to felony possession of ammunition and was placed on three years' probation.

On March 19, 2010, Rainey and his 8-year-old son were involved in a car accident on Route 79 in San Diego. His son bruised several internal organs, but was released from the hospital by March 24. Rainey, however, sustained fractures to both feet, right hand, neck, sternum and clavicle, and was expected to remain hospitalized for another week. The California Highway Patrol reported that Rainey was intoxicated at the time of the crash, and would be facing charges of DUI, child endangerment, and driving without a license.

On June 19, 2011, Rainey was arrested on suspicion of felony corporal injury on a spouse or cohabitant, and was held at Los Angeles County Men’s Central Jail on $30,000 bail until his July 6 appearance in a San Fernando court.

On November 8, 2012, Rainey pleaded no contest to stalking an unidentified woman on February 22 of that year, and on November 8 was sentenced to two years in Wasco State Prison. Having received credit for 401 days already served, he was expected to be released in a little under a year.

As of 2013, Rainey was on felony probation and forbidden from leaving Los Angeles County, California.

== In popular culture ==
- In 1998, the satirical MTV claymation show Celebrity Deathmatch depicted a fight to the death between Puck, Jacinda Barrett, Tami Roman, and Jon Brennan.
- In Pedro, Nick Oceano's 2008 film dramatizing Pedro Zamora's life, Rainey is portrayed by Matt Barr.
