= Sean Duffy =

American politician (born 1971)

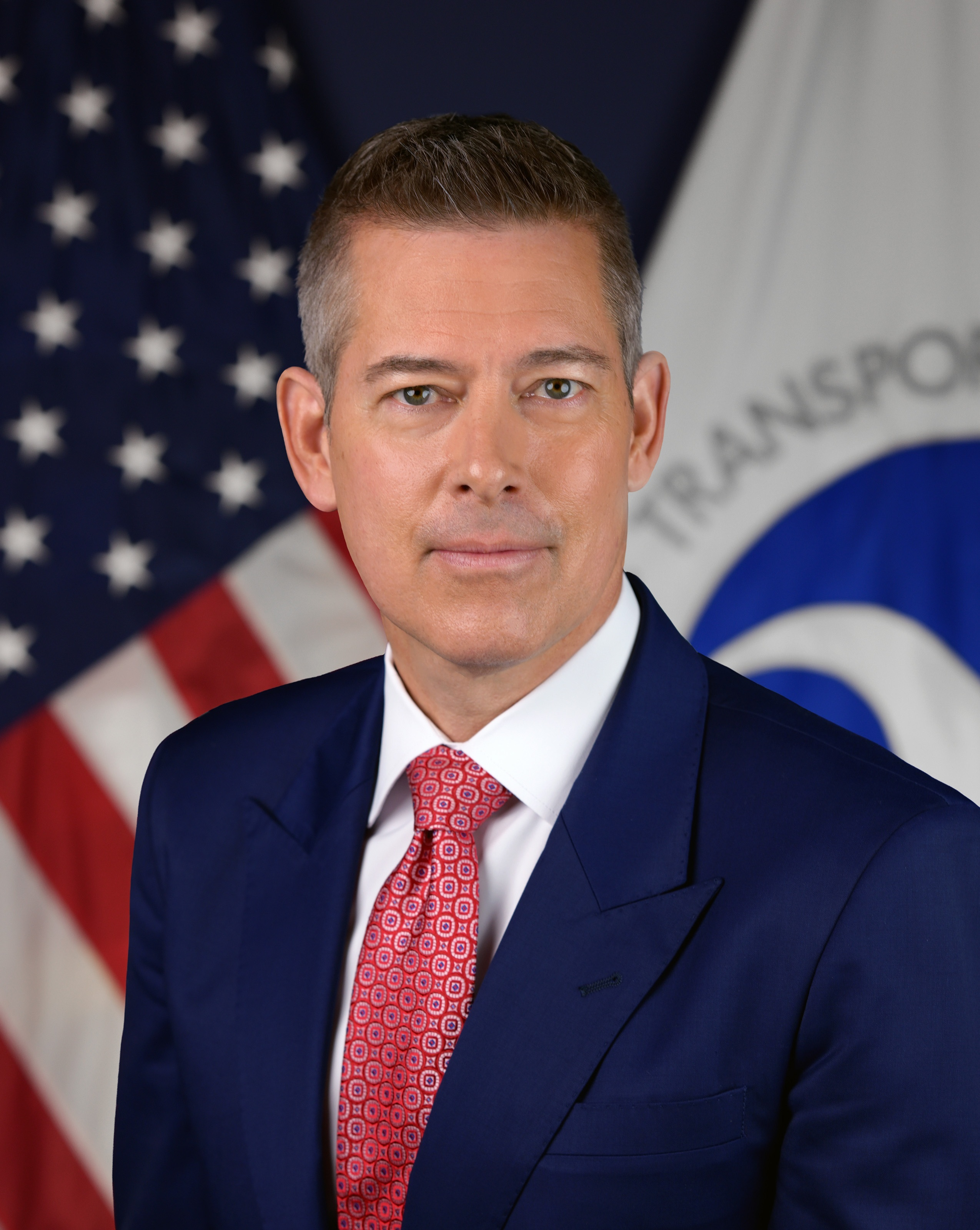
- Official portrait, 2025

20th United States Secretary of Transportation
- Incumbent
- Assumed office January 28, 2025
- President: Donald Trump
- Deputy: Steven G. Bradbury
- Preceded by: Pete Buttigieg

Acting Administrator of the National Aeronautics and Space Administration
- In office July 9, 2025 – December 18, 2025
- President: Donald Trump
- Preceded by: Janet Petro (acting)
- Succeeded by: Jared Isaacman

Member of the U.S. House of Representatives from Wisconsin's 7th district
- In office January 3, 2011 – September 23, 2019
- Preceded by: Dave Obey
- Succeeded by: Tom Tiffany

District Attorney of Ashland County
- In office August 1, 2002 – July 9, 2010
- Appointed by: Scott McCallum
- Preceded by: Michael Gableman
- Succeeded by: Kelly McKnight

Personal details
- Born: Sean Patrick Duffy; October 3, 1971 (age 55) Hayward, Wisconsin, U.S.
- Party: Republican
- Spouse: Rachel Campos (m. 1999)
- Children: 9
- Relatives: Leah Campos (sister-in-law); Michael Alfonso (son-in-law); Erik Johnson (nephew)
- Education: Saint Mary's University of Minnesota (BA); William Mitchell College of Law (JD)
- Duffy's voice Duffy addressing the 2026 FAA nationwide ground stop Recorded November 13, 2026

Sean Patrick Duffy (born October 3, 1971) is an American politician, attorney, and former television personality who is serving as the 20th United States secretary of transportation. Duffy previously served as the acting administrator of NASA from July to December 2025. A member of the Republican Party, he served as the U.S. representative for Wisconsin's 7th congressional district from 2011 to 2019 and the district attorney of Ashland County, Wisconsin from 2002 to 2010.

Duffy competed professionally in Loggersports, winning multiple speed-climbing titles at Hayward's Lumberjack World Championship for several years. In 1997, he appeared on The Real World: Boston. Duffy graduated from St. Mary's College of Minnesota with a degree in marketing and from the William Mitchell College of Law in 1999. In 2002, Duffy was appointed by Wisconsin governor Scott McCallum as the district attorney of Ashland County, serving in the position until 2010.

In July 2009, Duffy announced that he would challenge Democratic U.S. representative Dave Obey. He defeated state senator Julie Lassa, a Democrat who won the nomination after Obey announced he would not run for re-election, in the 2010 election for Wisconsin's 7th congressional district. Duffy was re-elected in 2012, 2014, 2016, and 2018. Duffy resigned from Congress in September 2019 following his newborn daughter's health complications.

After leaving Congress, Duffy worked for the political lobbying firm BGR Group. He began co-hosting Fox Business's The Bottom Line with Dagen McDowell in 2023. In November 2024, President-elect Donald Trump announced his intent to nominate Duffy to serve as U.S. Secretary of Transportation. Duffy was confirmed by the U.S. Senate on January 28, 2025, and sworn in the same day. On July 9, President Trump announced Duffy would serve as acting administrator of NASA until the U.S. Senate's confirmation of Jared Isaacman on December 18.

== Early life and education (1971–1997) ==
Sean Patrick Duffy was born on October 3, 1971, in Hayward, Wisconsin. Duffy was the tenth child of attorney Tom Duffy and Carol Duffy a homemaker and an accomplished competitive cross-country skier. He was raised in an Irish American Catholic family, several members of which participated in and won Hayward's annual Lumberjack World Championships. Duffy, inspired by his siblings, began logrolling when he was five. He attended and graduated from Hayward High School in 1990, where he played as a defenseman for the school's hockey team. He began speed climbing when he was fifteen. Duffy continued competing in loggersports after high school, winning a tree climbing title at the 1993 Mississippi River Log Boom. His speed climbing technique involved reckless movement; Fred Scheer compared Duffy to a "race-car driver who bumps the wall now and then". Duffy was the world champion speed climber at the 1994 Lumberjack World Championship.

He graduated from Saint Mary's University of Minnesota with a B.A degree in marketing in 1994 and worked for Scheer's Lumberjack Shows in the summers. By June 1997, The New York Times Magazine considered Duffy one of the top American lumberjacks at that time. He later graduated from the William Mitchell College of Law with a J.D. degree in 1999. Duffy's nephew is Erik Johnson, the longtime Colorado Avalanche defenseman who was the first overall pick in the 2006 NHL entry draft.

== Career ==
=== Television and sports work (1997–2004) ===
In 1997, Duffy auditioned for The Real World: Boston, the sixth iteration of MTV's The Real World set in Boston, Massachusetts, and became a cast member by July. In his audition, Duffy said that he was interested in "cute girls"; his role on the show was described by The New York Times as a "resident playboy". The series completed filming in December, though Duffy would begin filming for Road Rules: All Stars (1998) that month, necessitating him to delay another semester of law school. On the set of Road Rules, he met Rachel Campos. The two married in April 1999 at the Newman Center at Arizona State University located within Old St. Mary's Church; though they planned to wed later that year, Campos's unexpected pregnancy expedited their wedding; the two have nine children together. In 2002, Duffy appeared in and won Real World/Road Rules Challenge: Battle of the Seasons. He competed in the Great Outdoor Games's competitions for log rolling in 2000 and 2001 and for speed climbing from 2000 to 2002 and in 2005. In 2003, Duffy was named as a commentator for the Great Outdoor Games. He was named as an honorary athlete for the 2004 Badger State Winter Games. Additionally, he was a commentator for the mixed doubles Boom Run.

=== Prosecutor and district attorney (2002–2010) ===
After graduating from law school in 1999, Duffy worked for his father's practice for two years before becoming a special prosecutor for Ashland County. In June 2002, Wisconsin governor Scott McCallum appointed Duffy as the district attorney of Ashland County following Michael Gableman's resignation. Duffy told The Post-Crescent that he intended to run for a complete term in that year's election. He ran unopposed in that year's election and the 2004 election. Duffy served as a Wisconsin delegate in the 2004 Republican National Convention and the 2004 presidential election. In May 2005, Wisconsin's Federal Nominating Commission forwarded four candidates, including Duffy, to succeed J. B. Van Hollen as the United States attorney for the Western District of Wisconsin. Duffy was re-elected in 2006 and 2008. As district attorney, he had a ninety percent conviction rate.

== U.S. House of Representatives (2011–2019) ==
=== Tenure ===
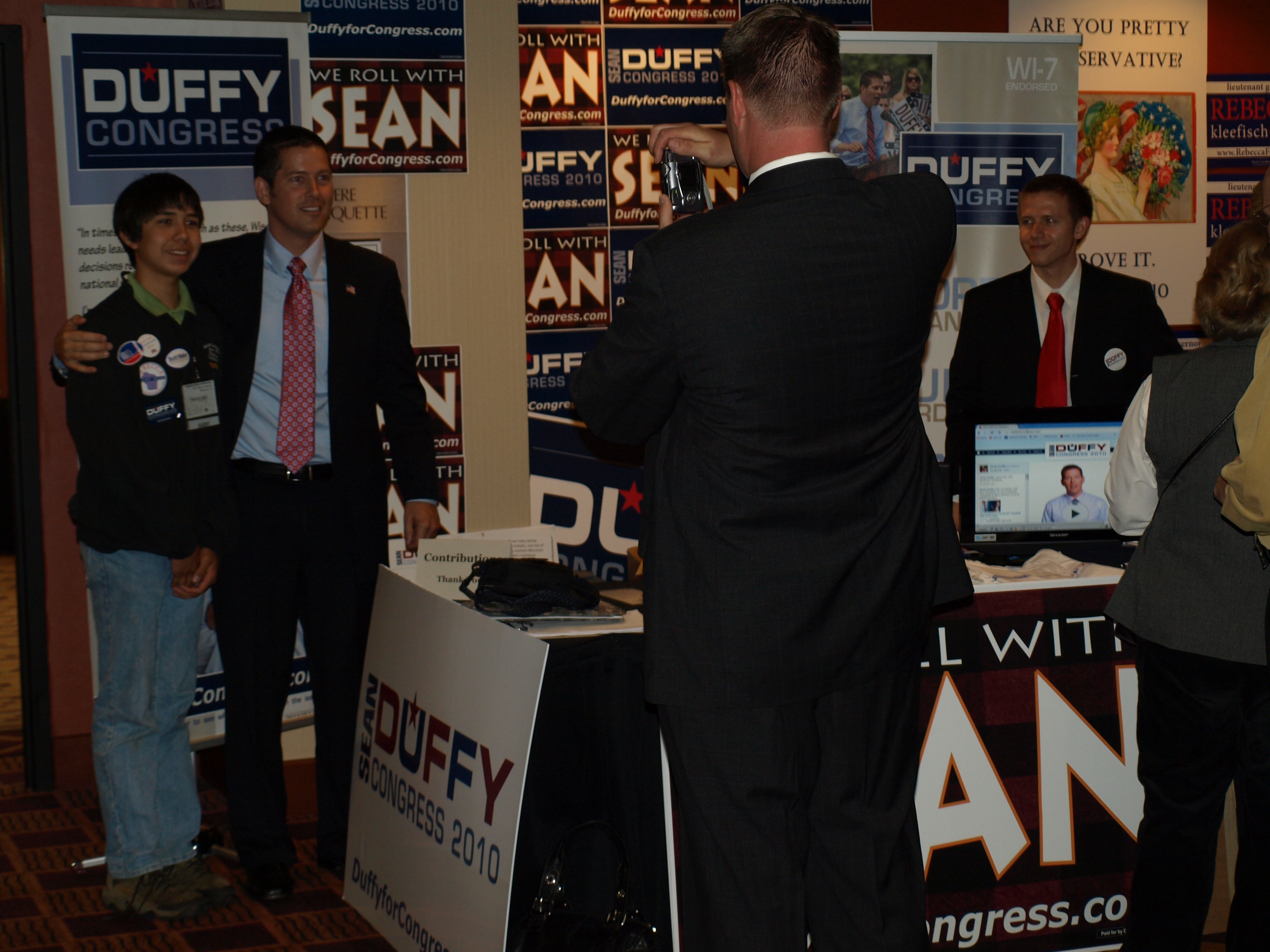
Duffy campaigning in May 2010

In June 2003, Duffy stated that he was considering challenging representative Dave Obey, who had served as the United States representative for Wisconsin's seventh congressional district since 1969, as a Republican in the 2004 election. In February 2004, he declined to challenge Obey, citing Rachel's expected third child. In July 2009, Duffy indicated he would run for representative. On July 9, at Wausau Homes in Rothschild, Duffy announced that he would challenge Obey in the 2010 election. He later told The New York Times that he decided to challenge Obey, then the chair of the House Committee on Appropriations, over his position in strengthening government, particularly his role in the American Recovery and Reinvestment Act and healthcare reforms proposed during the Obama administration.

Finance filings released by Duffy's campaign in October revealed that he had accrued relatively fewer donations than Obey, though Duffy had not taken money from political action committees. The achievement made the campaign eligible for the National Republican Congressional Committee's Young Guns program, giving it further funding. The Duffy campaign hit $300,000 in January 2010, setting a record. Duffy received endorsements from former Alaska governor Sarah Palin and the Seventh Congressional District Republican Party through a caucus it held. In May 2010, Obey announced that he would not be running for re-election. The following day, the Duffy campaign was promoted within the Young Guns program, further unlocking additional financial resources. By that month, Duffy had been expected to advance to the general election. In September, Duffy defeated Dan Mielke in the Republican primary. Duffy defeated Julie Lassa to win the general election in November.

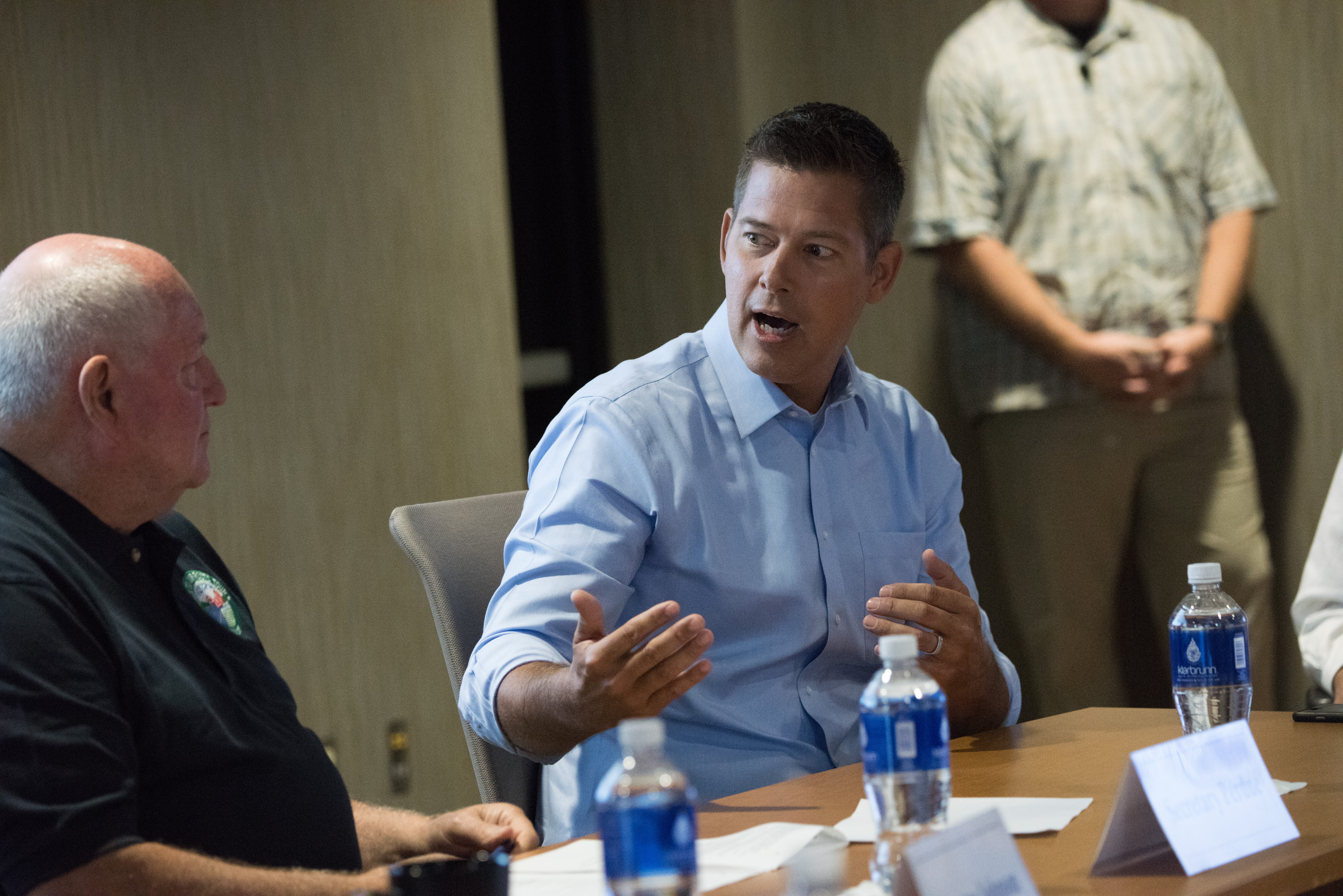
Duffy speaking to Sonny Perdue, the secretary of agriculture, in August 2017

Duffy spoke at the 2011 Conservative Political Action Conference, focusing his talk on "cutting spending by the spenders". He criticized earmarks in his campaign, though he later expressed a willingness to secure necessary financing. His critics labeled a measure to construct the St. Croix Crossing as an earmark; Duffy disputed that label. Duffy expressed reservations over an effort to repeal sections of the Affordable Care Act, but voted with Republicans amid a reassurance of a replacement from House majority whip Kevin McCarthy. He voted against a bill that would defund NPR, citing his constituent's use of public radio. In June 2011, the Wisconsin State Assembly approved a congressional map that would politically benefit Duffy with the intention of securing his seat. He was re-elected in 2012, 2016, and 2018.

After being initially sworn in, Duffy was named to the House Committee on Financial Services. In November 2014, he was named as the chairman of the Financial Services Subcommittee on Oversight and Investigations. In October 2015, Duffy was named to the House Select Investigative Panel on Planned Parenthood. A proposed bill by Duffy in July 2011 would have installed a five-member oversight panel to control the Consumer Financial Protection Bureau and would have given Congress greater authority to overturn the bureau's regulations. He praised the Budget Control Act to resolve the 2011 debt-ceiling crisis as an act of bipartisanship. In April 2016, he introduced the Puerto Rico Oversight, Management, and Economic Stability Act to resolve the Puerto Rican government-debt crisis. Duffy proposed a bill in January 2019 that would have expanded presidential tariff authority. Duffy spoke at the 2012 Republican National Convention—despite an overall lessened prominence from House Republicans at the convention that year, the 2016 Republican National Convention, and the 2020 Republican National Convention. Duffy started Plaidcast (2017–2019) in 2017, among several members of Congress who started a podcast that year.

=== Resignation ===
On August 26, 2019, Duffy announced that he would resign over complications involving his ninth child, who had not been born yet. His resignation was effective on September 23. Rachel Campos-Duffy gave birth in October. Campos-Duffy stated that the child had "two holes in the heart and valves that need to be fixed", as well as Down syndrome. Duffy's resignation led to a special election; Republican Tom Tiffany won the election, defeating Democrat Tricia Zunker.

== Post-government activities (2019–2024) ==
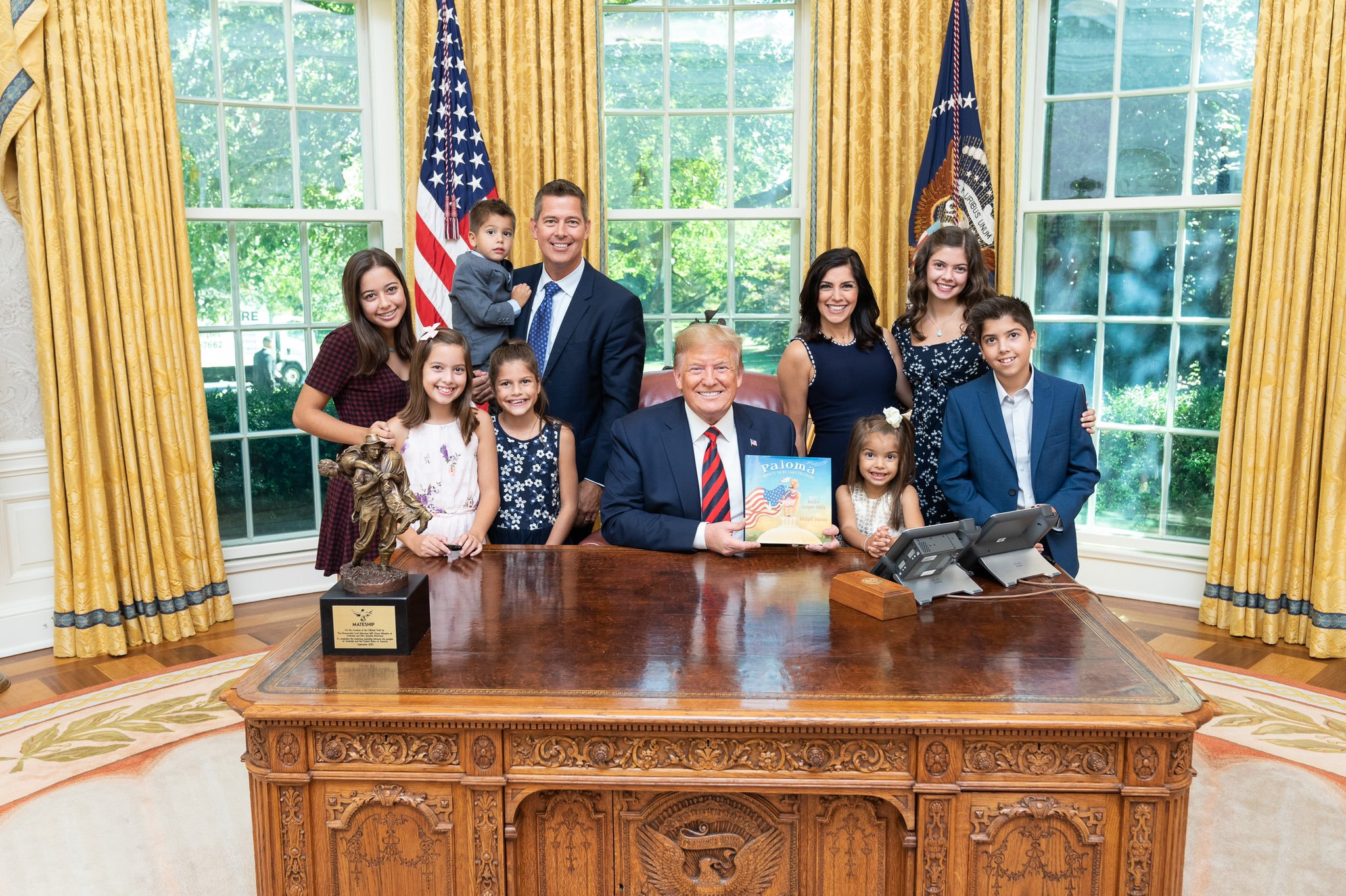
Duffy and his family with President Donald Trump in the Oval Office in October 2019

In October 2019, CNN hired Duffy as a paid contributor. He faced criticism for defending Donald Trump in a scandal involving a quid pro quo with Ukrainian president Volodymyr Zelenskyy and suggesting that a Democratic National Committee server had gone missing in Ukraine. Jeffrey Toobin, a legal contributor to the network, rebuked Duffy for his "anti-immigrant bigotry" after he described the whistleblower Alexander Vindman as loyal to Ukraine. CNN's vice president, Rebecca Kutler, defended Duffy. In November, he joined BGR Group as a senior counsel leading its financial services practice. He was registered to lobby until 2023, when he joined the firm's advisory board, remaining on the board until he was named as Trump's secretary of transportation. Duffy represented various clients, including Enterprise Products and the Partnership for Fair and Open Skies. In 2021, Duffy and his wife, Rachel Campos-Duffy, began a podcast, From the Kitchen Table: The Duffys (2021–2024). He began co-hosting Fox Business's The Bottom Line with Dagen McDowell in 2023.

In August 2021, Duffy and his family purchased a home in Far Hills, New Jersey under a principal residence mortgage and subsequently purchased a second home in Washington, D.C. under a principal residence mortgage in February 2025.

== Secretary of Transportation (2025–present) ==
=== Nomination and confirmation ===
On November 18, 2024, President-elect Donald Trump announced his intention to nominate Duffy for U.S. Secretary of Transportation. Duffy appeared before the Senate Committee on Commerce, Science, and Transportation on January 15 in a notably non-contentious hearing that focused on aviation safety and infrastructure. Duffy stated before the committee that he would clear bureaucratic efforts to advance critical infrastructure projects and that he would increase the number of air traffic controllers. The Committee on Commerce, Science, and Transportation voted to advance his nomination 28–0 on January 22. The U.S. Senate voted to confirm Duffy on January 28, 2025, in a 77–22 vote; protesting a federal grant pause, several Democrats voted against Duffy. Duffy was sworn into office that same day by Supreme Court justice Clarence Thomas.

=== Initial tenure ===
In one of his initial acts as secretary, Duffy moved to revert corporate average fuel economy standards set by his predecessor, Pete Buttigieg. He issued a directive prioritizing high-birthrate areas—predominantly Republican states—for federal assistance and additionally sought to restrict transportation funding from local governments that do not comply with Trump's immigration policy. The following day, a passenger jet collided with a United States Army helicopter over the Potomac River in Duffy's first crisis. In the aftermath of the incident, Duffy directed the Federal Aviation Administration to restrict two helicopter routes near Ronald Reagan Washington National Airport. Following the incident, he repeated Trump's assertion that the apparent failure of air traffic controllers to avert the collision was a result of diversity, equity, and inclusion hiring practices. Days later, the Federal Aviation Administration's NOTAM systems experienced a temporary outage, leading to flight delays. The effort to keep air traffic controllers came with a pay increase. Additionally, Duffy continued the Department of Transportation's oversight of Boeing.

Duffy's work intersected with the Department of Government Efficiency and Elon Musk's activities within the federal government, including efforts to force federal employees to resign. He rejected the Office of Personnel Management's early retirement offer for "critical positions in regard to safety", including air traffic controllers. After Musk stated that the Department of Government Efficiency would assess outdated aviation technology, Duffy confirmed that he had agreed to improve internal systems. Senator Maria Cantwell, the ranking member of the Senate Committee on Commerce, Science, and Transportation, sent a letter to Duffy in response that urged him to dissociate Musk with the Federal Aviation Administration; in February, Duffy said on X that SpaceX officials would be visiting the agency. The following month, The New York Times reported on a meeting between Duffy and Musk in which Duffy criticized the Department of Government Efficiency for purportedly attempting to fire air traffic controllers.

In February 2025, Duffy sent a letter to New York governor Kathy Hochul objecting to congestion pricing in New York City and stating his intention to revoke the program's federal approval. His campaign to end the program involved a social media video featuring five men displeased with congestion pricing. Duffy later delayed New York's deadline to end the program hours before it was originally set. By April, the U.S. Department of Transportation had begun putting pressure New York to end congestion pricing after an agreement with New York transit officials stayed the program. That month, Duffy announced that the federal government would assume control of Pennsylvania Station. In addition, he threatened to withhold federal funding from the Metropolitan Transportation Authority over subway crime, risking the city's $14 billion effort to improve transit that depends on federal assistance.

Duffy cut federal funding for the Texas Central Railway in April 2025 and California High-Speed Rail in June 2025. In July, Duffy issued a letter to states stating that crosswalks should be "free from distractions", an ostensible reference to rainbow crossings; after the letter was sent, the Florida Department of Transportation removed a rainbow crossing intended to memorialize the victims of the Pulse nightclub shooting. The directive was cited by city officials in Lubbock to remove a Buddy Holly-themed crosswalk. The following month, Duffy canceled and withdrew $679 million from offshore wind projects.

Duffy removed bike lanes, road diets, speed safety cameras, and variable speed limits from the Federal Highway Administration Proven Safety Countermeasures list in 2026.

=== Air traffic controller crisis ===
Amid an air traffic controller staffing crisis, Duffy announced several incentives to encourage entrants to the air traffic controller workforce, including a financial bonus to new hires and academy graduates, in May 2025. That month, he announced a framework to strengthen air traffic control infrastructure, including improving radio systems and using fiber optic cables. The crisis intensified after the federal government began a shutdown in October. Duffy cited the shutdown in withholding US$18 billion in federal funding to projects in New York City. As the shutdown persisted into November, Duffy emerged as a key messenger. He threatened to close parts of the national airspace and ordered a ten percent reduction of air traffic at forty airports. Duffy's plan to cut air traffic elicited praise from some Republicans and Jennifer Homendy, the chair of the National Transportation Safety Board, and criticism from some Democrats; Senate Minority Leader Chuck Schumer referred to the directive as a "stunt".

=== The Great American Road Trip ===
In October 2025, Duffy began traveling for The Great American Road Trip, a television series. According to Duffy's wife, Rachel Campos-Duffy, they were prompted to film the series after President Donald Trump told members of his cabinet to "do something special" for the United States Semiquincentennial.

The Great American Road Trip presented ethical concerns for the United States Department of Transportation. In May 2026, Citizens for Responsibility and Ethics in Washington submitted a complaint to the Office of Inspector General for the Department of Transportation over the participation of Duffy and his family, in addition to possible conflicts of interest over the funding of the show. The trip coincided with a campaign urging Americans to restore "civility", including by eschewing wearing pajamas on airplanes.

When the series made its debut on YouTube in August 2026, Duffy was widely criticized for participating in the project because its sponsors were companies with industry interests regulated by the Department of Transportation, that lobbied the department with 100 million dollars worth of spending. The series includes Duffy, his wife, nine children, and son-in-law Michael Alfonso, a candidate for Wisconsin's seventh district in Congress.

== Acting administrator of NASA (July–December 2025) ==
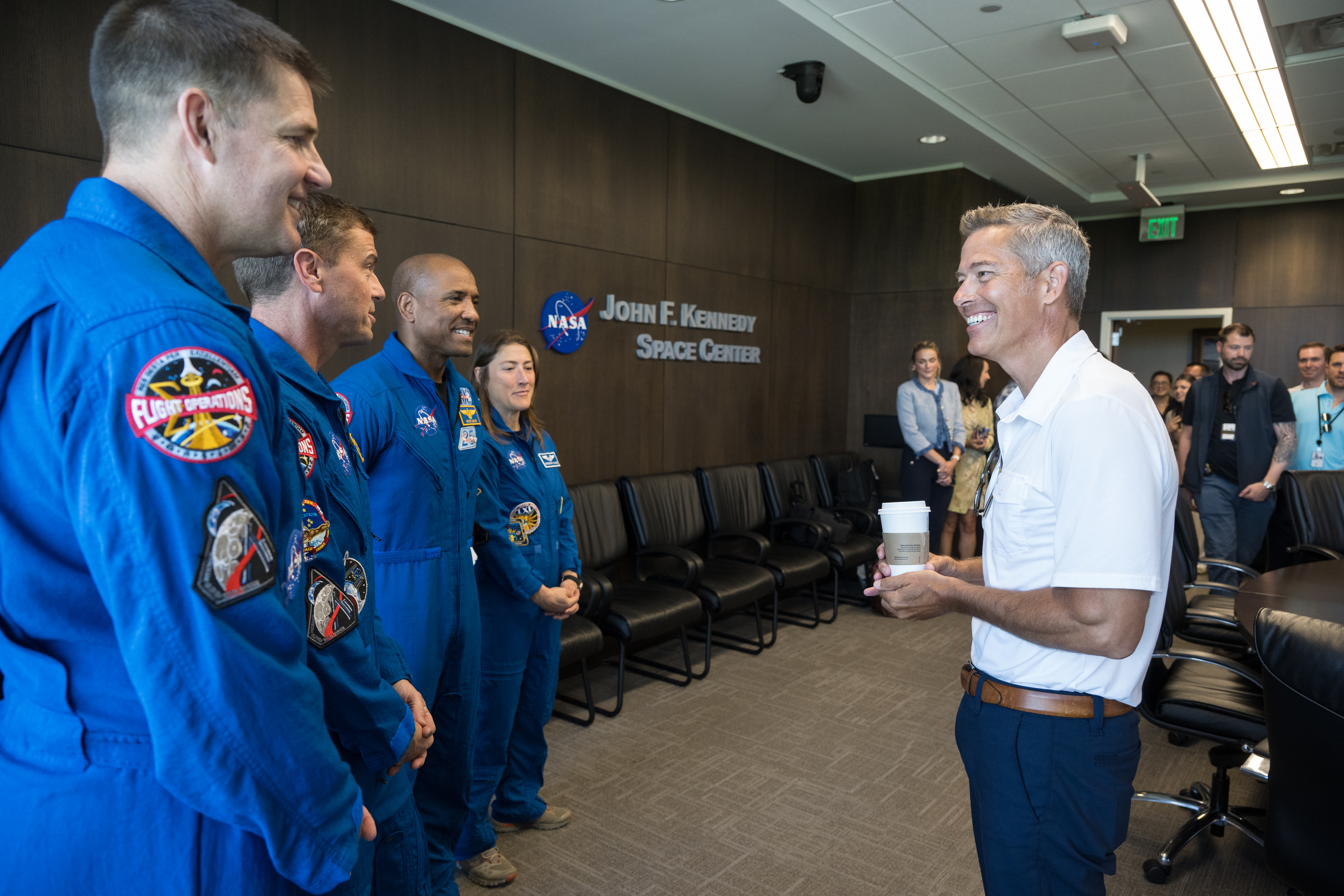
Duffy meeting with Artemis II astronauts in July 2025

On July 9, 2025, President Donald Trump named Duffy as the acting administrator of NASA, succeeding acting administrator Janet Petro. The following month, Duffy issued a directive to construct a nuclear reactor on the Moon and to replace the International Space Station. He continued NASA's shift entrusting rocket launches to SpaceX. After SpaceX's progress appeared to stall by October, Duffy opened the bidding process for Artemis III to other companies, including Blue Origin; SpaceX's chief executive, Elon Musk, criticized Duffy for several days on X in response to the decision. He served in the role until Jared Isaacman was sworn in December 2025.

== Political positions ==
Duffy rejected being a member of the Tea Party movement, though he has praised the movement and conservative political commentator Glenn Beck. In an op-ed for The Washington Times a year after the passage of the Dodd–Frank Wall Street Reform and Consumer Protection Act, he critically reviewed its impact as "woefully under-delivered". Duffy has criticized the federal government's response to climate change as an "agenda of control" and has questioned the scientific consensus of climate change. In September 2025, Duffy criticized Charlotte city officials following the killing of Iryna Zarutska, arguing that the city was responsible for the incident due to its failure to properly penalize the suspect, Decarlos Brown Jr., despite his criminal record, including armed robbery.

In May 2025, Duffy blamed his predecessor, Pete Buttigieg, and President Joe Biden for not being reactive enough in fixing aviation problems at the Department of Transportation. At the Paris Air Show the following month, Duffy advocated for free trade in aerospace. He told the conservative news site Blaze Media in November that he wanted healthier snacks on planes. After Spirit Airlines ceased operations in May 2026, Duffy disagreed with an assertion by its chief executive, Dave Davis, that the airline was forced to shut down in response to the Iran war fuel crisis.

=== November 13, 2026 ground stop ===
On November 13, 2026, an FAA-ordered ground stop was issued at 3:36 p.m. EST, and ended at 8:30 p.m. EST. Duffy represented the FAA at a press conference in which he said the event was caused by outdated technology and infrastructure. He then requested that Congress approve $50 billion (USD) for improvements.

== Bibliography ==
In December 2021, Duffy co-authored All American Christmas with his wife, Rachel Campos-Duffy.

== Electoral history ==
2010 United States House of Representatives Republican primary for Wisconsin's seventh congressional district
Party	Candidate	Votes	%
Republican	Sean Duffy	41,032	66.1
Republican	Dan Mielke	21,100	33.9
Total votes		62,132	100.0

2010 United States House of Representatives election for Wisconsin's seventh congressional district
Party	Candidate	Votes	%
Republican	Sean Duffy	132,551	52.2
Democratic	Julie Lassa	113,018	44.5
Independent	Gary Kauther	8,397	3.3
Total votes		253,966	100.0

2012 United States House of Representatives election for Wisconsin's seventh congressional district
Party	Candidate	Votes	%
Republican	Sean Duffy	201,318	56.1
Democratic	Pat Kreitlow	157,340	43.9
Total votes		358,658	100.0

2014 United States House of Representatives Republican primary for Wisconsin's seventh congressional district
Party	Candidate	Votes	%
Republican	Sean Duffy	26,062	87.9
Republican	Don Raihala	3,574	12.1
Total votes		29,636	100.0

2014 United States House of Representatives election for Wisconsin's seventh congressional district
Party	Candidate	Votes	%
Republican	Sean Duffy	169,451	59.2
Democratic	Kelly Westlund	112,895	39.5
Independent	Lawrence Dale	3,661	1.3
Total votes		286,007	100.0

2016 United States House of Representatives election for Wisconsin's seventh congressional district
Party	Candidate	Votes	%
Republican	Sean Duffy	223,418	61.7
Democratic	Mary Hoeft	138,643	38.3
Total votes		362,061	100.0

2018 United States House of Representatives election for Wisconsin's seventh congressional district
Party	Candidate	Votes	%
Republican	Sean Duffy	194,061	60.1
Democratic	Margaret Engebretson	112,895	38.5
Independent	Ken Driessen	3,661	1.4
Total votes		322,784	100.0

U.S. House of Representatives
Preceded by Dave Obey	Member of the U.S. House of Representatives from Wisconsin's 7th congressional district 2011–2019	Succeeded by Tom Tiffany
Political offices
Preceded by Pete Buttigieg	United States Secretary of Transportation; 2025–present	Incumbent
Government offices
Preceded by Janet Petro; Acting	Administrator of the National Aeronautics and Space Administration; Acting; 2025	Succeeded by Jared Isaacman
Order of precedence
Preceded by Scott Turner as Secretary of Housing and Urban Development	Order of precedence of the United States as Secretary of Transportation	Succeeded by Chris Wright as Secretary of Energy
U.S. presidential line of succession
Preceded by Scott Turner as Secretary of Housing and Urban Development	14th in line as Secretary of Transportation	Succeeded by Chris Wright as Secretary of Energy
