= National LGBTQ Wall of Honor =

LGBTQ memorial in New York City

Coordinates: 40.7339°N 74.0022°W

- Interactive map of National LGBTQ Wall of Honor
- Location: Greenwich Village, Manhattan, New York City, New York, U.S.
- Established: 2019

The National LGBTQ Wall of Honor is a memorial wall in the Greenwich Village neighborhood of Manhattan in New York City, dedicated to LGBTQ "pioneers, trailblazers, and heroes." Located inside the Stonewall Inn, the wall is part of the Stonewall National Monument, the first U.S. National Monument dedicated to the country's LGBTQ rights and history. The first fifty inductees were unveiled June 27, 2019, as a part of events marking the 50th anniversary of Stonewall. Five honorees are added annually.

== History ==
In February 2019, the National LGBTQ Task Force and Imperial Court System announced their plans for the Wall of Honor. Nicole Murray Ramirez was the project's founder, and the Wall was supported by the co-owners of the Stonewall Inn. The monument committee accepted initial nominations to honor deceased LGBTQ heroes who have had a positive impact on LGBTQ civil rights. Fifty of the initial nominees were selected to form the first round of people on the wall.

The Wall of Honor was dedicated on June 27, 2019, the night before the 50th anniversary of the Stonewall riots as part of Stonewall 50 – WorldPride. The Wall of Honor was created inside the Stonewall Inn, which was remodeled after the riots but remained a bar by 2019. The unveiling ceremony held talks that focused on the honorees' achievements and the ongoing fight for LGBTQ rights. Many speakers critiqued contemporary anti-LGBTQ policy in the U.S. promoted by the 2016 Trump administration.

More inductees have been added to the Wall of Honor in each year following its 2019 founding. In 2025, all seven inductees were trans: the organizers stated this was an intentional choice in the face of heightened attacks against transgender and nonbinary communities. them commented that the year's honorees communicated the increased violence and political fights for trans rights, and the erasure of trans history, highlighted by the U.S. government's modifications to the Stonewall Monument.

== Nominations ==
The wall was designed to honor "the lives of LGBTQ trailblazers, pioneers and s/heroes who have passed", and have had a positive impact on LGBTQ civil rights. Initial nominations were collected online.

The nominations are administered by a Board of Governors, consisting of eighteen LGBTQ leaders including transgender activist Marsha Botzer, Black LGBTQ activist Mandy Carter, LGBTQ youth advocate Wilson Cruz, LGBTQ human rights activist Stuart Milk, and founder of the Metropolitan Community Church Troy Perry.

== Honorees ==
The first fifty honorees were announced in June 2019. (Note: Eric Rofes was omitted from the initial list but is listed on the Task Force's website.) In June 2020, the first additional five were announced: Lorena Borjas, Larry Kramer, Phyllis Lyon, Sean Sasser, and Aimee Stephens.

=== A ===
- Dolores Alexander was a lesbian feminist writer and reporter. In 1969 she became the first executive director of the National Organization for Women (NOW) but resigned. She later founded the feminist restaurant Mother Courage. She was added to the wall in 2022.
- Gloria Allen was a transgender activist who ran a non-profit charm school for trans youth. In addition to inspiring the play Charm, she received the Living Legend Award at the Trans 100 Awards and a Carmen Vázquez Award for Excellence in Leadership on Aging Issues from SAGE. She was added to the wall in 2023.
- Wanda Alston was an LGBTQ feminist activist who organized for NOW, national LGBTQ marches, and the Democratic Party.

=== B ===
- Gilbert Baker was a gay artist and activist who created the Rainbow flag without license so the LGBTQ symbol would spread worldwide.
- James Baldwin was a gay novelist, playwright, and activist who explored intricacies of racial, sexual, and class distinctions in America.
- Larry Baza was a gay man who was "a titan of the arts scene in San Diego" and a long-standing member of the California Arts Council, serving as its chair at the time of his death from COVID-19. He was added to the Wall in 2024.
- Melvin "Mel" Boozer was a gay and Black activist for African American, LGBTQ and HIV/AIDS issues. He was active in both the Democratic and Socialist Party USA, becoming the first openly gay person ever nominated for Vice President of the United States in 1980.
- Lorena Borjas was a Mexican-American transgender and immigrant rights activist, known as the mother of the transgender Latinx community in Queens, New York. Her work on behalf of immigrant and transgender communities garnered recognition throughout New York City and the United States. She was added to the wall in 2020.
- Ivy Bottini was a lesbian artist, activist and co-founder of the New York branch of the NOW, for whom she designed the logo in 1969. She was added to the wall in 2021.

=== C ===
- Jiggly Caliente was a trans drag artist and singer who achieved worldwide fame appearing on multiple seasons of RuPaul's Drag Race, as well as hosting Drag Race Philippines. She also found success as an actress, portraying Veronica Ferocity on Pose. She was added to the Wall in 2025.
- Michael Callen was a gay singer, songwriter, composer, author, and influential early AIDS activist.
- Tyler Clementi was an 18-year-old Rutgers University student who was cyberbullied into suicide by homophobic classmates. He was added to the wall in 2022.
- Charles H. Cochrane was the first openly gay New York City policeman. He came out publicly in 1981 during a hearing on whether to ban discrimination against gay people. The bill never passed, but Cochrane was hailed for his bravery, and later formed the Gay Officers Action League. He was added to the Wall in 2024.
- Lynn Conway was a computer scientist and educator who was fired from IBM in 1968 after her status as a trans woman became public. After working at Xerox for a decade, during which she helped launch the Mead–Conway VLSI chip design revolution, she became a professor at the University of Michigan and devoted herself to trans activism after her retirement. She was added to the Wall in 2025.

=== D ===
- Darcelle XV was a drag queen and coffee shop owner from Portland, OR. From 2016 until her death, she was recognized as the "world's oldest performing drag queen" by the Guinness Book of World Records. She was added to the wall in 2023.
- Stormé DeLarverie was a biracial butch lesbian whose scuffle with police was, according to some eyewitnesses, the spark that ignited the 1969 Stonewall uprising. She has been hailed as "The Rosa Parks of the gay community" and a gay civil rights icon. She was also a singer, drag king, MC, and volunteer street patrol worker, the "guardian of lesbians in the Village".

=== E ===
- Ruth Ellis was an African American activist recognized as the oldest living out lesbian, dying at 101. The Ruth Ellis Center is named in her honor. She was added to the wall in 2021.
- Paula L. Ettelbrick was an internationally acclaimed lesbian lawyer, educator, and pioneer of the LGBTQ equality movement. She served as director for Lambda Legal, National Centre for Lesbian Rights, the National Gay and Lesbian Task force, and the International Gay and Lesbian Human Rights Commission and led the Stonewall Community Foundation.

=== F ===
- Leslie Feinberg was a butch transgender lesbian, author, communist organizer, and early transgender activist, whose writings have been foundational in the field of gender studies, as well as setting the standard for much of the terminology around gender identity.

=== G ===
- Rick Garcia was an activist known for his work with various groups to improve relations between the LGBTQ and Catholic communities. After working with United Farm Workers, Dignity USA, he co-founded Equality Illinois and became a significant figure in the successful 15-year campaign for a 1988 ordinance prohibiting sexual-orientation discrimination as part of the activist group known as the "Gang of Four." He later contributed to the passage of the Cook County Human Rights Ordinance in 1993. He was added to the Wall in 2026.
- Cecilia Gentili was an Argentinian-born transgender advocate for sex workers' rights, Director of Policy at GMHC and successfully sued the Trump administration to prevent the removal of trans healthcare from the Affordable Care Act. She was added to the Wall in 2024.
- Barbara Gittings was a lesbian activist who participated many of the earliest gay rights actions in the United States. In 1958 she founded the New York chapter of the Daughters of Bilitis, and from 1963 to 1966 she edited the group's magazine, The Ladder. She organized the gay caucus of the American Library Association to promote positive literature about homosexuality in libraries, and in 1972 was a part of the movement that succeeded in getting the American Psychiatric Association to drop homosexuality as a mental illness. One of the original 50 honorees, she was re-added to the Wall in 2026.
- Miss Major Griffin-Gracy was an activist and organizer for transgender rights, who was involved in the Stonewall riots. She was added to the Wall in 2026.
- Sakia Gunn was a black lesbian victim of a hate crime in 2003. Outrage over the leniency towards her killer and lack of media coverage led to the formation of the Newark Pride Alliance. In 2023, Newark renamed Academy Street to Sakia Gunn Way. She was added to the Wall in 2024.

=== H ===
- Keith Haring was a gay pop artist whose graffiti-like work grew out of the New York City street culture of the 1980s addressing political and societal themes—especially homosexuality and AIDS—through his own iconography and sexual allusions.
- E. Lynn Harris was an openly gay Black author best known for his depictions of African-American men who were on the down-low and closeted in ten consecutive books that made The New York Times Best Seller list, making him among the most successful African-American or gay authors of his era.
- Alan L. Hart was a trans man who, as a doctor and medical researcher, pioneered the use of X-rays in diagnosing tuberculosis. After his death, controversy arose between the lesbian and trans communities over whether Hart was a woman or a trans man; the controversy stemmed in part over whether "transsexualism", as it was then known, could be recognized in people born before it was part of the lexicon. He also wrote four novels. He was added to the Wall in 2025.
- Henry "Harry" Hay Jr. was a Marxist organizer involved in some of the earliest gay rights organizations, including the Mattachine Society—the first sustained gay rights group in the United States which launched some of the earliest public protests by gays and lesbians—as well as co-founding the Radical Faeries, a worldwide loosely-affiliated gay spiritual movement.
- Heklina was a drag queen and stage actress. She co-founded Trannyshack (now called Mother), a long-running series of drag shows, and frequently collaborated with fellow drag queen and filmmaker Peaches Christ. She was added to the wall in 2023.
- Diana Hemingway was a genderqueer transfeminine artist and activist, who was neuroatypical on the autism spectrum, and worked on "trans/queer issues, sex worker rights, disability rights, economic justice, racism, and issues impacting the kink community".
- Essex Hemphill was an openly gay Black spoken word poet, author and activist known for his insights into issues of the African-American gay community.
- James Hormel was a diplomat and philanthropist. He helped found the Human Rights Campaign, served on the board of amfAR, and was the United States Ambassador to Luxembourg under the Clinton administration, the first openly gay man to hold such a post. He was added to the Wall in 2022.
- Brenda Howard was a bisexual rights activist, sex-positive feminist, and polyamorist who is known as the "Mother of Pride" for coordinating the first Christopher Street Liberation Day March in 1970, and originating the idea for a week-long series of pride events that we know today. She also helped popularize Pride to describe the festivities. Among the LGBTQ groups she worked with over her decades of activism were: Gay Liberation Front, Gay Activists Alliance, BiNet USA, ACT UP, Queer Nation and New York Area Bisexual Network.
- C. Wayne Hussey was one of the first openly gay residents of Anchorage, Alaska. He was a drag queen and LGBTQ activist who founded the Alaskan Imperial Court System. In 1974 he was the first recipient of the Peter Dispirito Public Service Award, presented "to the person elected by the Alaska Gay and Lesbian Community who has contributed most to the advancement of the community."
- Loraine Hutchins was a bisexual activist and writer, most well-known for co-editing and contributing to Bi Any Other Name, which, after being mislabeled by the Lambda Literary Awards as a "Lesbian Anthology," sparked a campaign to force the addition of bisexual categories to the awards, which succeeded in 2006. She became a professor at Montgomery College and published several peer-reviewed papers. She was added to the Wall in 2026.

=== J ===
- Marsha P. Johnson was a Black, gay, and gender nonconforming artist, drag queen, and activist who fought for gay liberation and AIDS awareness. A Stonewall riots combatant and founding member of the Gay Liberation Front NYC, Johnson was the co-founder of Street Transvestite Action Revolutionaries, and a member of ACT UP.
- ABilly S. Jones-Hennin was a Black bisexual man who advocated for healthcare, AIDS education, and disability rights following a spinal stenosis diagnosis. In 1978, he cofounded the National Coalition of Black Lesbians and Gays and co-organized the 1979 March on Washington for Lesbian and Gay Rights. Later in life, he served as the chair of the DC Mayor's LGBT Advisory Committee. He was added to the Wall in 2024.
- June Jordan was a Black bisexual poet, essayist, teacher, and activist who used her writing to discuss issues of gender, race, immigration, and representation. She advocated for Black English Vernacular, and influenced feminist, and queer theory.
- Leslie Jordan was an openly gay, Emmy Award-winning actor best known for playing a supporting role on Will & Grace. Over a forty-year long career, he appeared in many films, plays, and TV shows, and became a popular Instagram personality during the COVID-19 pandemic. He was added to the wall in 2023.
- Christine Jorgensen was a trans woman, the first person widely known in the U. S. for having sex reassignment surgery, including using estrogen. She went to Copenhagen, Denmark, for sex reassignment surgery returning to the U.S. in the early 1950s an instant celebrity, and used her platform to advocate for transgender people and enlighten on gender identity.

=== K ===
- Franklin Edward "Frank" Kameny was a gay activist fired for being gay, he is the first known civil rights claim based on sexual orientation pursued in a U.S. court. He became a co-founder of the Washington, D.C., Mattachine Society, created the Gay and Lesbian Alliance of Washington, D.C. His activism laid the groundwork for the American Psychological Association to remove homosexuality from its Diagnostic and Statistical Manual of Mental Disorders, and the Don't Ask, Don't Tell Repeal Act of 2010.
- Alfred Charles Kinsey was a bisexual scientist and pioneering sexologist who founded the Kinsey Institute for Research in Sex, Gender, and Reproduction. He is best known for the Kinsey Reports in the late 1940s/early 1950s, as well as the Kinsey scale which, with his research on human sexuality and in the field of sexology changed worldwide attitudes on female sexuality, homosexuality, and bisexuality among other previously taboo topics.
- Larry Kramer was an award-winning American playwright known for The Normal Heart and other works, author, film producer, public health advocate, and LGBTQ rights activist. He co-founded the Gay Men's Health Crisis, the world's largest private organization assisting people living with AIDS, and the AIDS Coalition to Unleash Power (ACT UP) which changed public health policy and the perception of people living with AIDS. He was added to the wall in 2020.
- Kiyoshi Kuromiya was a gay Japanese-American activist in the civil rights, anti-war, gay, and AIDS movements. He was a co-founder of Gay Liberation Front- Philadelphia, an openly gay delegate to the Black Panther Convention, an assistant of Martin Luther King Jr., direct action activist with ACT UP, and People With AIDS (PWA), founder of the Critical Path Project, and the leading plaintiff in the Supreme Court case Kuromiya vs. The United States of America, calling for the legalization of marijuana for medical uses.

=== L ===
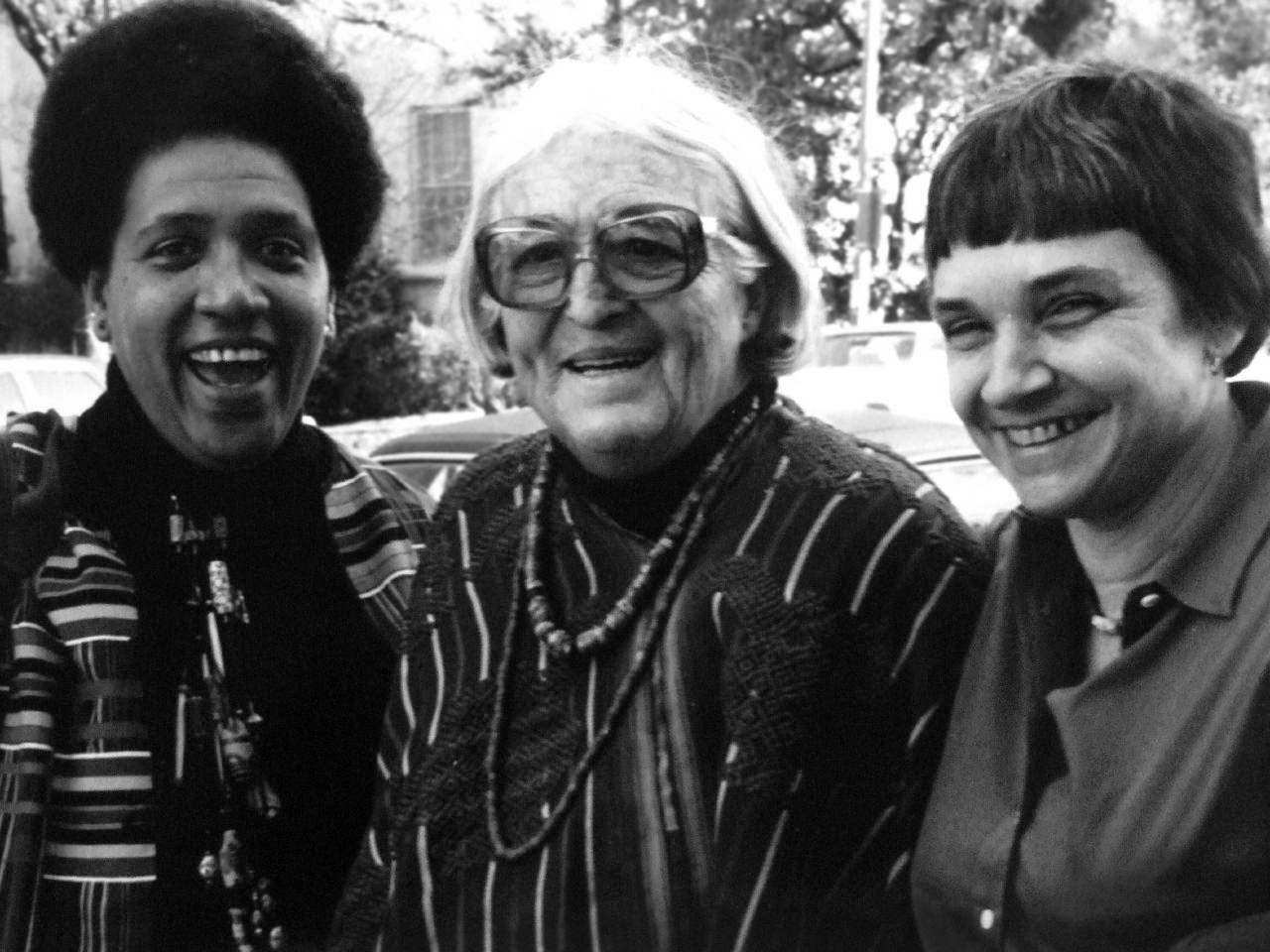
Audre Lorde (left) with writers Meridel Le Sueur (middle) and Adrienne Rich (right) at a writing workshop in Austin, Texas, 1980

- Crystal LaBeija was a Black gay Manhattan drag queen who founded the House of LaBeija in 1977 to counter systemic racism in the drag pageant system. The house is known internationally and is often credited as having started "house" ball culture for drag queen families countering heteronormativity.
- The Lady Chablis was a Black trans woman who worked as an entertainer in the American South, most notably in Atlanta and Savannah. She is most famous for being featured in the nonfiction novel Midnight in the Garden of Good and Evil, even playing herself in the film version. Her appearance on a 1996 episode of This Old House was one of the earliest notable appearances of a trans person on mainstream television. She was added to the Wall in 2025.
- Christopher Lee was a Chinese and Polish-American transgender activist, and award-winning filmmaker who co-founded Tranny Fest in 1997, later renamed the San Francisco Transgender Film Festival, the first transgender film and arts festival in the world. In 2002 he became the first openly trans man grand marshal of San Francisco Pride. His death certificate misgendering him led to the 2014 California Respect After Death Act.
- J. Frederic "Fritz" Lohman was a gay art collector who, along with his partner Charles W. Leslie, founded the Leslie-Lohman Museum of Art, a gathering of over 22,000 pieces of queer art, including works by Robert Mapplethorpe, Jean Cocteau, and Andy Warhol. He was added to the wall in 2023.
- Audre Lorde was a lesbian feminist writer, librarian, and civil rights activist whose work was influential in the formation of womanism and the early versions of identity politics. As a poet, she is known for both technical mastery and emotional expression, as well as her poems that express anger and outrage at civil and social injustice. Her poems and prose largely deal with issues related to civil rights, feminism, lesbianism, and the exploration of Black female identity.
- Phyllis Lyon, was a lesbian feminist and LGBTQ rights activist who, along with her wife Del Martin founded the Daughters of Bilitis (D.O.B.) in 1955. D.O.B. was the first social and political organization for lesbians in the U.S. and the couple acted as president and editor of the organization's magazine, The Ladder. The couple joined NOW together, the first openly lesbian couple to do so. They were the first couple married in the historic San Francisco 2004 same-sex weddings. As these weddings were ruled legally invalid, they were the first couple married again in June 2008, after the California Supreme Court's decision In re Marriage Cases. She was added to the wall in 2020.

=== M ===
- Jeanne Sobelson Manford was an LGBTQ ally, schoolteacher and activist. After her gay son Morty was beaten by police, she publicly supported him and marched in the 1972 NYC Pride March with a sign in support of gay children. She and her husband founded the support group Parents, Families and Friends of Lesbians and Gays (PFLAG), for which she was awarded the 2012 Presidential Citizens Medal.
- Dorothy Louise Taliaferro "Del" Martin was a lesbian feminist and gay-rights activist who, along with her wife Phyllis Ann Lyon, founded the Daughters of Bilitis (D.O.B.) in 1955. D.O.B. was the first social and political organization for lesbians in the U.S. and the couple acted as president and editor of the organization's magazine, The Ladder. The couple joined NOW together, the first openly lesbian couple to do so. They were the first couple married in the historic San Francisco 2004 same-sex weddings. As these weddings were ruled legally invalid, they were the first couple married again in June 2008, after the California Supreme Court's decision In re Marriage Cases.
- Ruddy Martinez, better known as "Mami Ruddys," was a Puerto Rican trans woman and drag icon who converted her home into a shelter for disowned queer youths. She was added to the Wall in 2025.
- Technical Sergeant Leonard Philip Matlovich was a gay Vietnam War veteran who fought to stay in the United States Air Force after coming out of the closet. He became a cause célèbre around which the gay community rallied. His photograph appeared on the cover of the September 8, 1975 issue of Time magazine, making him a symbol for thousands of gay and lesbian service members and gay people generally. Matlovich was the first named openly gay person to appear on the cover of a U.S. news magazine.
- Terrence McNally was a gay playwright, who won numerous Tony Awards for his plays, including Kiss of the Spider Woman and Ragtime. He also won a Primetime Emmy Award and multiple Obie and Drama Desk Awards. He was added to the wall in 2023.
- Harvey Milk was a politician and the first openly gay elected official in the history of California, where he was elected to the San Francisco Board of Supervisors. He was the most prominent LGBT politician in the United States at the time. On November 27, 1978, Milk and San Francisco Mayor George Moscone were assassinated in city hall, leading to the White Night riots. Despite his short career in politics, Milk became an icon in the city and a martyr in the gay community. He was posthumously awarded the Presidential Medal of Freedom in 2009.
- David Mixner was prominent gay rights and anti-war activist. After gaining notoriety from helping to organize the Moratorium to End the War in Vietnam, he became an early ally of Harvey Milk, working on the campaign to defeat the Briggs Initiative. He eventually became an advisor on Bill Clinton's 1992 campaign, but broke with the administration over "Don't Ask, Don't Tell." He was added to the Wall in 2024.
- Jeffrey Montgomery was an American LGBTQ activist and public relations executive. In 1984, his partner was shot to death outside a Detroit gay bar, prompting Montgomery to engage in LGBTQ advocacy. He started work on LGBTQ anti-violence issues upon learning that the police were not spending many resources on solving the murder, calling it "just another gay killing". In 1991, Montgomery helped found the Triangle Foundation (now Equality Michigan) in order to advocate for LGBTQ victims of violence and to improve handling of LGBTQ related cases. He became nationally known for his work and served at numerous organizations.

=== N ===
- Sam Nordquist was a biracial trans man who was the victim of a horrific hate crime in Hopewell, New York, being brutally tortured for almost three months before dying of his injuries. Seven people have been arrested in connection with his death. He was added to the Wall in 2025.

=== P ===
- Pat Parker was a Black lesbian feminist poet and activist. Her poetry addressed her tough childhood growing up in poverty, dealing with sexual assault, and the murder of a sister, along with many issues facing lesbians and Black women in contemporary culture. After two divorces she came out as a lesbian, "embracing her sexuality" she was liberated and "knew no limits when it came to expressing the innermost parts of herself". Parker participated in political activism and had early involvement with the Black Panther Party, Black Women's Revolutionary Council and formed the Women's Press Collective. She participated in many forms of activism especially regarding gay and lesbian communities, domestic violence, and rights of people of color. After she became too ill to perform, other poets and musicians continued to perform her work at music and arts festivals, "Movement in Black" being particularly popular.
- Chilli Pepper was a trans woman who found notoriety as a frequent talk show guest in the 1980s. In addition to combating harmful stereotypes about trans women, she was a dedicated AIDS awareness advocate. She was added to the Wall in 2025.
- Jimmy Pisano was a gay man who purchased the original Stonewall Inn location and reopened it as a bar called "Stonewall" in 1990. It never turned a profit, but Pisano and his then-partner kept the bar open until Pisano's death from AIDS complications in 1994. He was added to the wall in 2021.
- Achebe Betty Powell was the first Black lesbian to serve on the board of directors of the National Gay Task Force, and a founding member of the Astraea Lesbian Foundation for Justice. She attended the historic meeting of lesbian and gay leaders at the Carter White House in 1977, and worked with several feminist organizations around the world. She was added to the wall in 2023.

=== R ===
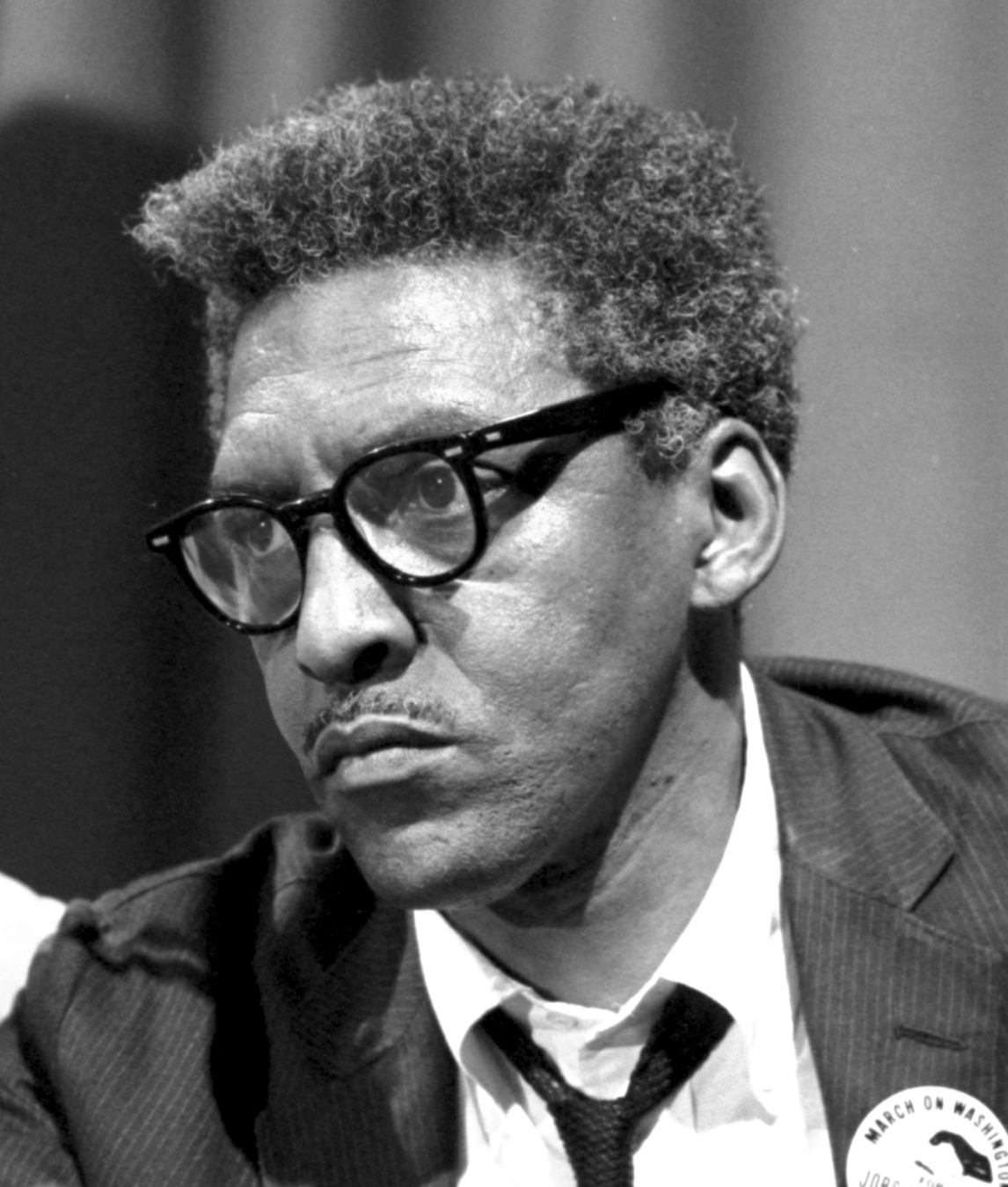
Bayard Rustin, organizer of the March on Washington for Jobs and Freedom, at a news briefing in Washington, D.C., on August 27, 1963

- Chuck Renslow was an openly gay photographer, activist and businessperson, known for pioneering modern homoerotic photography, and establishing landmarks of gay male culture, including significant contributions to the leather subculture. His accomplishments included opening the Gold Coast bar in 1958. It was the world's first gay leather bar, and hosted a leather contest that grew into the International Mr. Leather competition. His lover of 43 years was Dom Orejudos, aka the artist "Etienne" and "Stephen". Renslow also formed the Leather Archives and Museum with Tony DeBlase in Chicago in 1991. One of the original 50 honorees, he was re-added to the Wall in 2026.
- Adrienne Rich was a lesbian feminist poet and essayist, called "one of the most widely read and influential poets of the second half of the 20th century", and credited with bringing "the oppression of women and lesbians to the forefront of poetic discourse." Rich criticized rigid forms of feminist identities, and valorized what she coined the "lesbian continuum"; a female continuum of solidarity and creativity which has impacted and filled women's lives. She famously declined the National Medal of Arts, protesting then-House Speaker Newt Gingrich's attempt to end the National Endowment for the Arts.
- Luisa Rivera was an activist and researcher who championed immigrant rights, sex workers rights, and trans visibility. She was a member of the Decriminalize Sex Work California Coalition, the HIV Advocacy Network, led the San Francisco SlutWalk, and contributed to the modern scholarship on Guatemala's Mayan population. She was added to the Wall in 2026.
- Sylvia Rivera variously self-identified as a gay transvestite, drag queen, and in gender fluid terms. Active in the fight for gay liberation, Rivera was among the earliest transgender rights activists, pushing for inclusion of protections for trans people in legislation at a time when other gay activists said these provisions would doom gay rights bills to failure. Rivera brought a background in Latina civil rights and anti-war activism to groups like the Gay Liberation Front NYC, of which she was a member of the drag queen caucus. Rivera co-founded the Street Transvestite Action Revolutionaries (STAR), a group dedicated to helping homeless young gay kids, street kids, drag queens, and trans women.
- Monica Roberts was an African-American blogger, writer, and transgender rights advocate. She was the founding editor of TransGriot, a blog focusing on issues pertaining to trans women, particularly African-American and other women of color. Roberts' coverage of transgender homicide victims in the United States is credited for bringing national attention to the issue. She was added to the wall in 2021.
- Craig Rodwell was a gay activist known for founding the first bookstore devoted to gay and lesbian authors (Oscar Wilde Memorial Bookshop in November 1967), and as the prime mover for the creation of New York City Pride. Rodwell is considered by some to be the leading gay rights activist in the homophile movement of the 1960s.
- Eric Rofes was a gay activist, educator, and author. He was a director of the Los Angeles Gay and Lesbian Center in the 1980s. In 1989, he became executive director of the Shanti Project, a nonprofit AIDS service organization. He was a professor of education at Humboldt State University in Arcata, California, and served on the board of the National Gay and Lesbian Task Force. He wrote or edited twelve books. One of his last projects was co-creating "Gay Men's Health Leadership Academies" to combat what he saw as a "pathology-focused understanding of gay men" in safe-sex education.
- Vito Russo was a gay LGBT activist, film historian and author best known for The Celluloid Closet (1981, revised edition 1987), described in The New York Times as "an essential reference book" on homosexuality in the US film industry. It was later turned into a documentary film. In 1985 he co-founded the Gay and Lesbian Alliance Against Defamation (GLAAD), a watchdog organization that strives to end anti-LGBTQ rhetoric, and advocates for LGBTQ inclusion in popular media.
- Bayard Rustin was a gay African-American leader who played a key role in the movements for civil rights in the 1940s through the 1980s. He co-organized the 1941 March on Washington Movement to end racial discrimination in housing and employment. He later organized Freedom Rides in the American south and was instrumental in organizing the Southern Christian Leadership Conference alongside Martin Luther King Jr., teaching King about nonviolent direct action. Rustin organized the 1963 March on Washington for Jobs and Freedom, which was a turning point in the movement for civil and economic rights for Black Americans, and an inspiration to those working for social justice, worldwide. Due to the homophobia directed at him, he usually had to organize behind the scenes, uplifting civil-rights leaders who were not openly gay. In the 1980s, he was able to become a more public advocate on behalf of gay causes. In November 2013, President Barack Obama posthumously awarded Rustin the Presidential Medal of Freedom, which Rustin's partner, Walter Naegle, accepted on his behalf.

=== S ===
- Soraya Santiago Solla was a Puerto Rican hairdresser and politician who became a trailblazer for Puerto Rican trans women, becoming the first to successfully update her birth certificate, marry an immigrant, and run for office (Municipal Assembly seat for Carolina). She was added to the Wall in 2026.
- José Sarria better known as Absolute Empress I de San Francisco, and the Widow Norton, was a gay community organizer and political activist who became the first openly gay candidate for public office in the United States in 1961. He performed for years as a live-singing drag queen doing parodies of operas at the Black Cat Bar and founded the Imperial Court System, one of the oldest and largest LGBT organizations in the world, with chapters throughout North America.
- Sean Sasser was an American educator, activist, pastry chef and reality television personality best known for his appearances on MTV's The Real World: San Francisco, which depicted his relationship with fellow AIDS activist Pedro Zamora. This included a commitment ceremony in which the two exchanged vows, the first such ceremony for a same sex couple on television, and considered a landmark event in the medium. He was added to the wall in 2020.
- Matthew Wayne Shepard was a gay 21-year-old university student who was beaten, tortured, and left to die by two men in October 1998, he died six days later from severe head injuries. The story was covered worldwide including what role his sexual orientation played as a motive for the attack. His murder brought international attention to violence against LGBTQ people, and hate crime legislation. The Matthew Shepard and James Byrd Jr. Hate Crimes Prevention Act was passed in 2009. His mother Judy Shepard became a prominent LGBT rights activist and established the Matthew Shepard Foundation. His death inspired films, novels, plays, songs, and other works.
- Randy Shilts was a prolific gay journalist and author. In 1981, he became "the first openly gay reporter with a gay 'beat' in the American mainstream press" (at the San Francisco Chronicle). He published his first book in 1982, The Mayor of Castro Street: The Life and Times of Harvey Milk. His second book, And the Band Played On: Politics, People, and the AIDS Epidemic (1987), documented the early years of the AIDS epidemic in the U.S. His third book, Conduct Unbecoming: Gays and Lesbians in the US Military from Vietnam to the Persian Gulf, was published in 1993.
- Barbra Casbar Siperstein was an openly transgender political activist. She came out as a trans woman in the late 1980s. When her wife died in 2001 she channeled the grief into activism. She served in numerous Democratic Party political organizations including the New Jersey Stonewall Democrats, Garden State Equality and the Democratic National Committee Eastern Caucus. She advocated for gender inclusion in discrimination and hate crime laws in New Jersey. In 2009 she became the only openly transgender member of the Democratic National Committee serving in various roles until 2017.
- Stephen Sondheim, a New York gay man, was a composer and lyricist of some of the most influential musicals of the modern era. He was added to the wall in 2022.
- Aimee Stephens was an American funeral director known for her fight for civil rights for transgender people. She worked as a funeral director in Detroit and was fired for being transgender. Based on her court case, in a historic 2020 decision, the U.S. Supreme Court ruled that the 1964 Civil Rights Act protects gay, lesbian, and transgender employees from discrimination based on sex. She was added to the wall in 2020.
- Lou Sullivan was a trans man author and activist known for his work on behalf of trans men. He was perhaps the first transgender man to publicly identify as gay and is largely responsible for the modern understanding of sexual orientation and gender identity as distinct, unrelated concepts. He was a pioneer of the grassroots female-to-male (FTM) movement and founded FTM International, the first advocacy group for transgender men. He lobbied the American Psychiatric Association and the World Professional Association for Transgender Health for them to recognize his existence as a gay trans man determined to change people's attitudes towards trans homosexuals and to change the medical process of transitioning making the process "orientation blind".

=== U ===
- Virginia Uribe was lesbian and an educator, counselor and LGBTQ youth education outreach advocate. She was best known for founding Project 10, an educational support and drop-out prevention program for LGBTQ youth. She founded Project 10 in 1984 to help schools curtail harassment of, and reduce the dropout rate of, LGBTQ students in the Los Angeles Unified School District.

=== V ===
- Urvashi Vaid was an Indian-born American LGBT rights activist, lawyer, and writer. She held a series of roles at the National LGBTQ Task Force, wrote multiple books, and founded LPAC, the first lesbian Super PAC. She was added to the wall in 2022.
- Carmen Vázquez was a Puerto Rican lesbian and advocate for LGBT health, serving in or founding numerous organizations. She was added to the wall in 2021.
- Bruce Raymond Voeller was a gay rights activist and biologist who conducted research primarily in the field of AIDS. In 1973, he co-founded the National Gay Task Force (now renamed National LGBTQ Task Force). In 1977, President Jimmy Carter welcomed openly gay and lesbian Task Force leaders for the first official discussion of gay and lesbian rights in the White House. Within the first few years of the AIDS pandemic, Voeller coined the term acquired immune deficiency syndrome (AIDS) that is still used today.

=== W ===
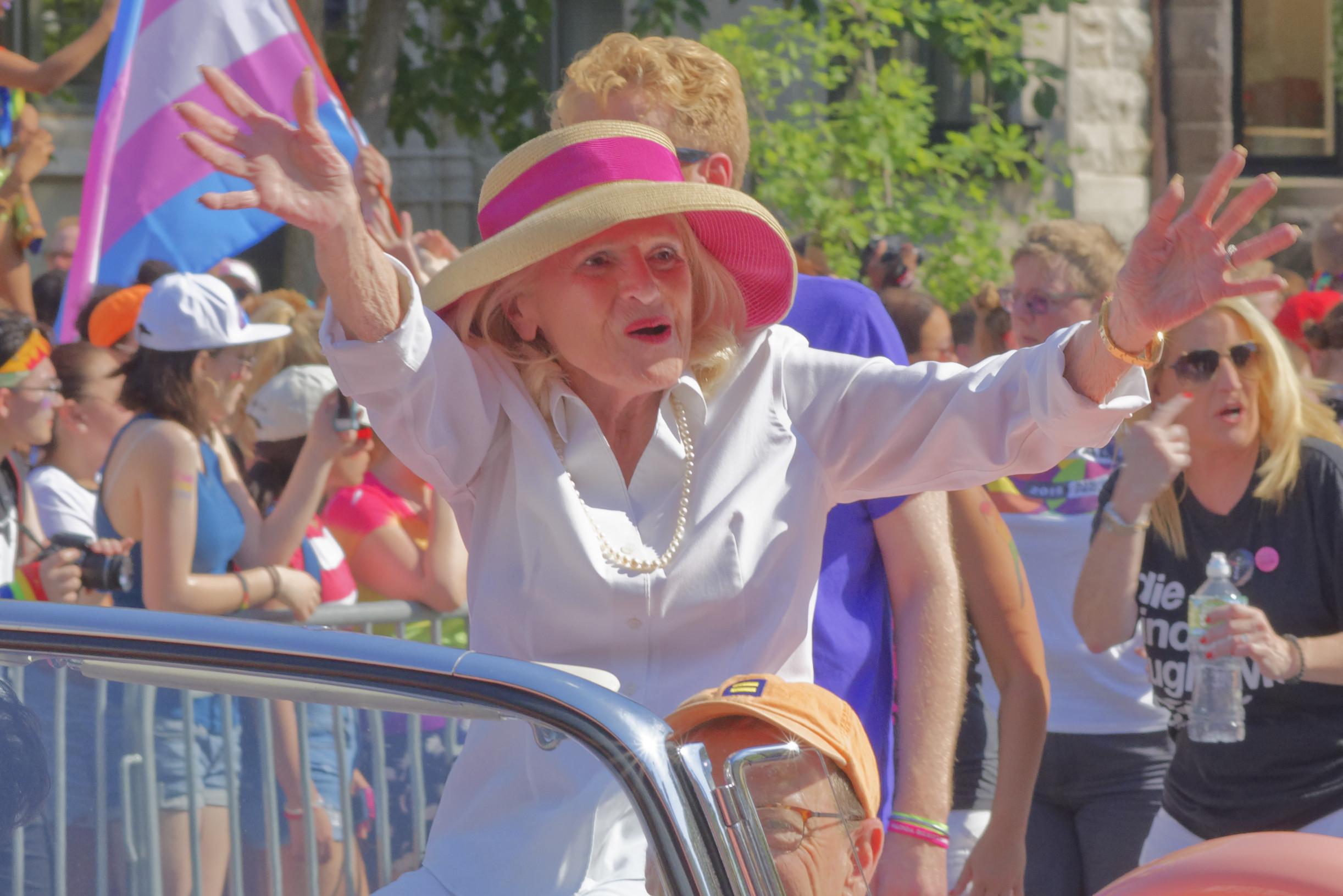
Edith "Edie" Windsor in the D.C. Pride Parade

- Patricia Nell Warren (also known by her pen name, Patricia Kilina) was a lesbian novelist, poet, editor, and journalist. Her second novel, The Front Runner (1974), was the first work of contemporary gay fiction to make the New York Times Best Seller list. Her third novel, The Fancy Dancer (1976), was the first bestseller to both portray a gay priest and to explore gay life in a small town.
- Janet Weinberg was a lesbian advocate for people with disabilities, and a fund-raiser and executive for social service organizations including Gay Men's Health Crisis (GMHC), Educational Alliance, and the Lesbian, Gay, Bisexual and Transgender Community Services Center in New York. In the 1980s, an illness disabled her to the point that she required a wheelchair.
- Edith "Edie" Windsor was a lesbian LGBT rights activist and a technology manager at IBM. She was the lead plaintiff in the United States Supreme Court case United States v. Windsor (2013). The case overturned Section 3 of the Defense of Marriage Act, which was a major victory in the struggle for same-sex marriage in the U.S. The decision led federal agencies in the Obama administration to extend rights, benefits, and privileges to same-sex married couples.
- Soni Wolf was a self-described dyke, motorcycle enthusiast, former U.S. Air Force Vietnam-era veteran, and "tenacious" queer activist. She co-founded the Dykes on Bikes (DOB) at the 1976 San Francisco Pride parade and rode with them each year until her death in 2018. The group was a highly visible symbol of empowerment and LGBT pride. DOB did "philanthropic work for LGBT causes and organizations around the world". Wolf continued to nurture DOB chapters worldwide and fought for their right to use the reclaimed term dyke; the DOB won a lawsuit against the U.S. Patent and Trademark Office so they could trademark their name.

=== Z ===
- Pedro Zamora was an openly gay Cuban-American AIDS educator and television personality who appeared on MTV's reality television series The Real World: San Francisco as one of the first openly gay men and person with AIDS to be portrayed in popular media. He brought international attention to HIV/AIDS and gave one of the first views into the daily lives of gay men. His interactions with his housemates exposed the homophobia and prejudices faced by people with AIDS. Zamora's romantic relationship with Sean Sasser was nominated by MTV viewers for the "Favorite Love Story" award. The broadcast of their commitment ceremony, in which they exchanged vows, was the first such same-sex ceremony in television history, and is considered a landmark in the history of the medium.

== See also ==
- LGBT culture in New York City
- List of LGBT people from New York City
- Transgender culture in New York City
