= Feminist businesses =

Companies established by activists involved in the feminist movement

Feminist businesses are companies established by activists involved in the feminist movement. Examples include feminist bookstores, feminist credit unions, feminist presses, feminist mail-order catalogs, and feminist restaurants. These businesses flourished as part of the second and third-waves of feminism in the 1970s, 1980s, and 1990s. Feminist entrepreneurs established organizations such as the Feminist Economic Alliance to advance their cause. Feminist entrepreneurs sought three primary goals: to disseminate their ideology through their businesses, to create public spaces for women and feminists, and to create jobs for women so that they did not have to depend on men financially. While they still exist today, the number of some feminist businesses, particularly women's bookstores, has declined precipitously since 2000.

Many of these were created primarily to provide a service, rather than with the goal of making a profit. Feminist health centers, many run as collectives, started along these lines. Lesbian bars and the women's music of the 1970s provided ways to meet.

== Feminist bookstores ==
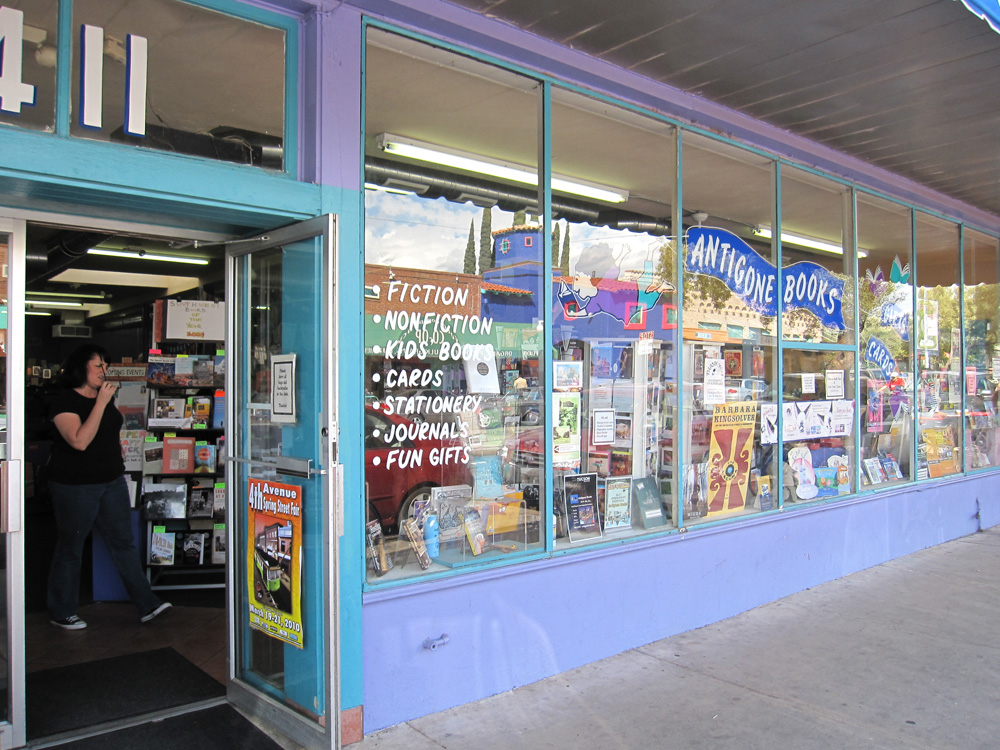
One of the oldest feminist bookstores, Antigone Books.

Feminist bookstores hold a part of the second-wave feminism movement inside their stores, with expansion of the bookstores beginning in the 1980s. In 1983 there were around 100 bookstores located in North America, which created over $400 million in sales annually. Independent bookshops have declined generally in the 21st century and there are in 2016 there were thought to be fewer than 20 feminist bookstores. The oldest surviving example, Antigone Books, is in Tucson, Arizona. The 13 book stores host feminist events to support feminism as well as carry books about the topics of queer theories, animal rights, lesbian fiction, gay studies, and also information about different cultures.

Notable stores include Amazon Bookstore Cooperative and Silver Moon Bookshop.

== Feminist economic alliance ==
During the Thanksgiving of 1975, the founding women of the Feminist Economic Alliance (FEA) met in Detroit, Michigan at a conference to discuss the problems women faced with money. Two leading women for the alliance in 1975 were Susan Osborne and Linda Maslanko, both from New York. They were the spokeswomen for FEA and educated the public on what the alliance meant and what the future of FEA looked like after splitting into eight geographic regions. The Feminist Economic Alliance was created to aid new sister credit unions as well as allowing any women to become economically powerful, independent, or grow as an individual. This independence for women was going to be achieved by encouraging, assisting, and promoting the women of feminist credit unions and feminist enterprises. The main idea behind this new alliance was that older sister credit unions could help the new developing credit unions by sharing research, resources, and guidance in the process.

== Feminist credit unions ==
In the 1970s during the second wave feminist movement, women had the urge to fight unequal credit so they created their own non-profit, financial institutions so that men were no longer in control of their money. The co-manager of the union, Susan Osborne, was creating an environment for women to save money as well as help other women in need. By creating their own credit unions, women were able to avoid being discriminated based on their gender even though the Equal Credit Opportunity Act of 1974 banned credit unions from discriminating potential customers. The women being excluded from receiving loans despite the law in place, were divorced women, low-income women, women needing legal money or women on welfare. Establishing feminist credit unions meant that they would now be able to receive loans hassle free, save their money, and gain money management counseling. When receiving credit, women are viewed by their individual character rather than if they were married or single. A woman no longer has to be the co-signer, she can now be in control of her money. The unions run no differently than any other union, in fact, the feminist credit unions are governed by the same laws as the normal credit unions.

=== Detroit, Michigan branch ===
In 1982, the Detroit, Michigan branch, the last feminist credit union, was dissolved due to financial problems and also the reconstruction of the unions language change. The language was suggested to be changed to include both genders, not just female. The Michigan Credit Union League saw the feminist credit unions as bias towards men and suggestions of equal consideration for males in a female position were to be given resulting in it being dissolved.

== Feminist mail-order magazines ==
=== History ===
The feminist mail-order magazine came from Great Britain around the 1970s and lasted until the 1990s. The collectives were notable for allowing women to take equal parts in the creation of the magazine in all areas including: copy typing, design, layout or interviewing. By allowing women the equal chance at learning, women were developing their creativity and gaining new skills. Women were allowed to fight back at the patriarchal system by voicing their opinions and allowing women who were excluded also have a platform. Excluded women during that time were black, lesbian, working class, or single mothers. Popular magazines at the time were Spare Rib, Scarlet Woman, Catcall, and Outwrite. The magazines were not afraid to comment about inequalities the women were facing or issues that needed to be addressed. Feminist activities were also talked about in the magazines creating networks, reformation, expressing opinions or attitudes relating to a certain topic. Mail-order magazines were a way for women to become educated on feminism and how to join the movement.

=== Magazines ===
==== Spare Rib ====
Spare Rib was a second-wave British feminist magazine that emerged from the counter culture of the late 1960s as a consequence of meetings involving, among others, Rosie Boycott and Marsha Rowe. Spare Rib is now recognised as an iconic magazine, which shaped debate about feminism in the United Kingdom, and as such it was digitised by the British Library in 2015. Spare Rib contained new writing and creative contributions which challenged stereotypes and supported collective solutions. The magazine was published between 1972 and 1993. The title derives from the Biblical reference to Eve, the first woman, created from Adam's rib.

==== Scarlet Woman ====
In April 1975, the first issue of Scarlet Woman was published by Sydney SW Collective. It was created to be a socialist feminist magazine and included articles dealing with money, lesbians, health and more.

==== Ms. ====
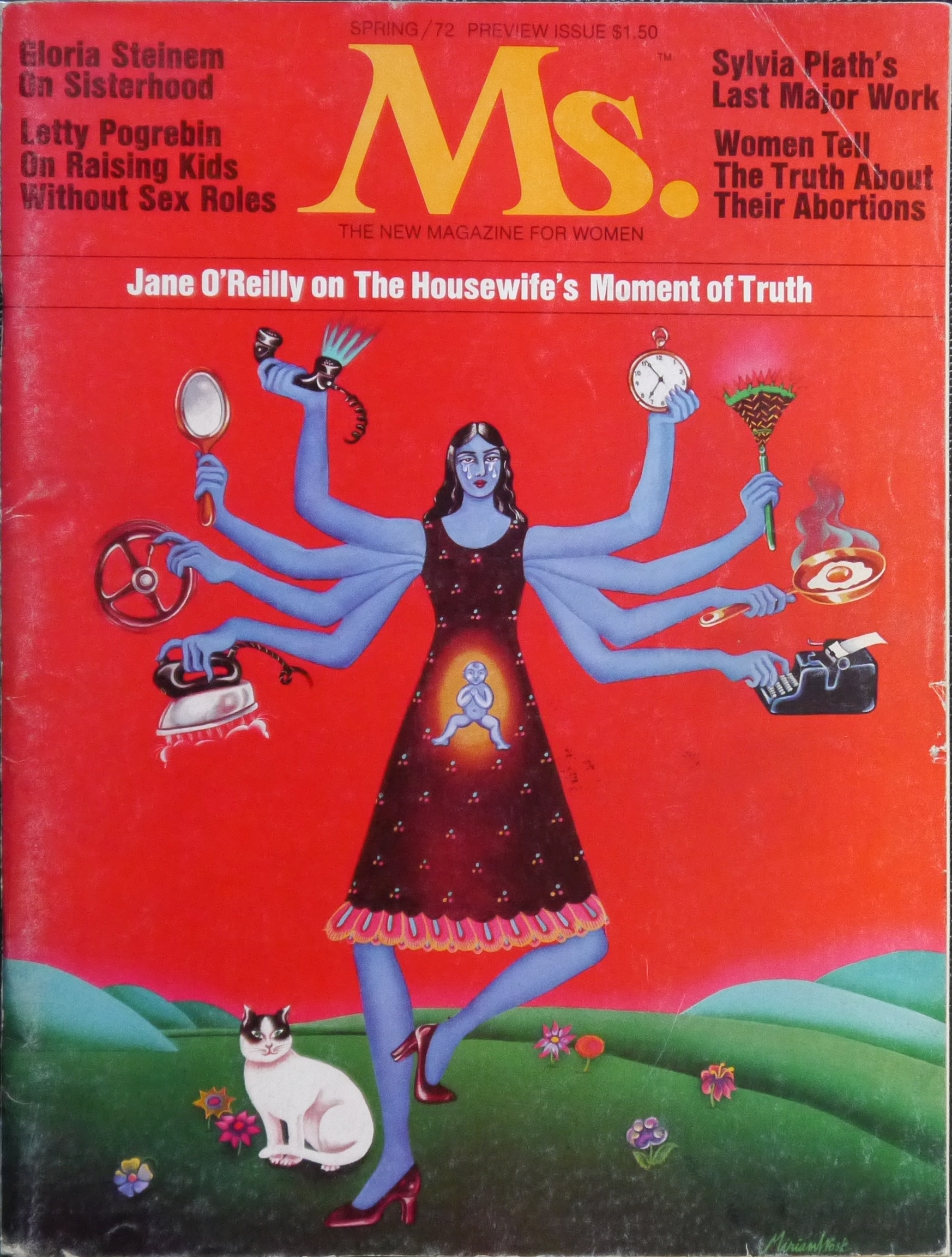
Ms. magazine cover, Spring 1972

Ms. is an American liberal feminist magazine co-founded by second-wave feminists and sociopolitical activists Gloria Steinem and Dorothy Pitman Hughes. Its founding editors were Letty Cottin Pogrebin, Mary Thom, Patricia Carbine, Joanne Edgar, Nina Finkelstein, and Mary Peacock. Ms. first appeared in 1971 as an insert in New York magazine. From July 1972 until 1987, it appeared as a stand-alone monthly publication; it now publishes quarterly.

Ms. was the first women's magazine to address domestic violence, speak about politics, or discuss topics men thought were unnatural for women, motivating the feminist movement. During its heyday in the 1970s, it enjoyed great popularity but was not always able to reconcile its ideological concerns with commercial considerations. Since 2001, the magazine has been published by Liberty Media for Women, LLC, owned by Feminist Majority Foundation, that is based in Arlington, Virginia and Los Angeles, California.

== Feminist restaurants ==
The earliest form of feminist restaurants took shape in suffrage restaurants, tea rooms, or lunch rooms. Food was sold at a low cost of five or ten cents and men were permitted to eat, in hopes of women persuading men to support a certain political cause. These restaurants suffered from conflicts dealing with the founders and donators. Alva Belmont, a wealthy socialite, was the founder of a suffrage restaurant that was known for strict rules and a fast pace. The ideas and motives behind these suffrage restaurants in the 1910s were the foundations for the feminist restaurants in the 1970s.

In April 1972, the first feminist restaurant, Mother Courage, was founded by Dolores Alexander in New York. Bloodroot, a vegan/vegetarian feminist restaurant and bookstore located in Bridgeport, Connecticut, has been in business since 1977.

Feminist restaurants are used more as a place to gather and socialize rather than eating. The restaurants were used to share ideas, literature, educate one another and to promote the feminist movement. Guest speakers, political speakers, poets, or musicians would come to the restaurants to promote issues or spread awareness. Coffee houses and cafes are also popular among the feminist movement. Restaurants offered same pay to every staff member, which was entirely women. The style was simple and supported the movements that were occurring during that time. They support other occupations by avoiding certain products such as lettuce and grapes for the farmers or boycotting orange juice for the anti-gay campaign. Feminist restaurants were also notable for treating women or lesbians with respect in a non-hostile environment. A woman who is dining with a man will be given a wine sample as well as the check at the end of the meal. That was typically not the case in restaurants that were not catered to feminism.

== Feminist businesses today ==
In today's society, feminist businesses look different besides the few bookstores left in the world. According to Business Insider, there exist many successful women-led companies are "leading trends, redefining industries, and bettering the world at large." One successful company started by a woman is Tory Burch. She created the store from her kitchen and created a business worth 3 billion dollars as of 2015, as well as a foundation called the Tory Burch Foundation in 2009 to help empower women and female entrepreneurs. Today feminist businesses are about empowering women in the shape of products sold, campaigns run, and businesses created. Maggie O'Carroll co-founded The Women's Organisation, initially named Train 2000, in 1996. Her organization is UK's largest female enterprise agency and has supported over 70,000 enterprising women and helped created over 4,000 businesses.

== See also ==
- Sh! Women's Erotic Emporium, the UK's first feminist sex shop
