= Ruby Corado =

LGBT activist and founder of Casa Ruby

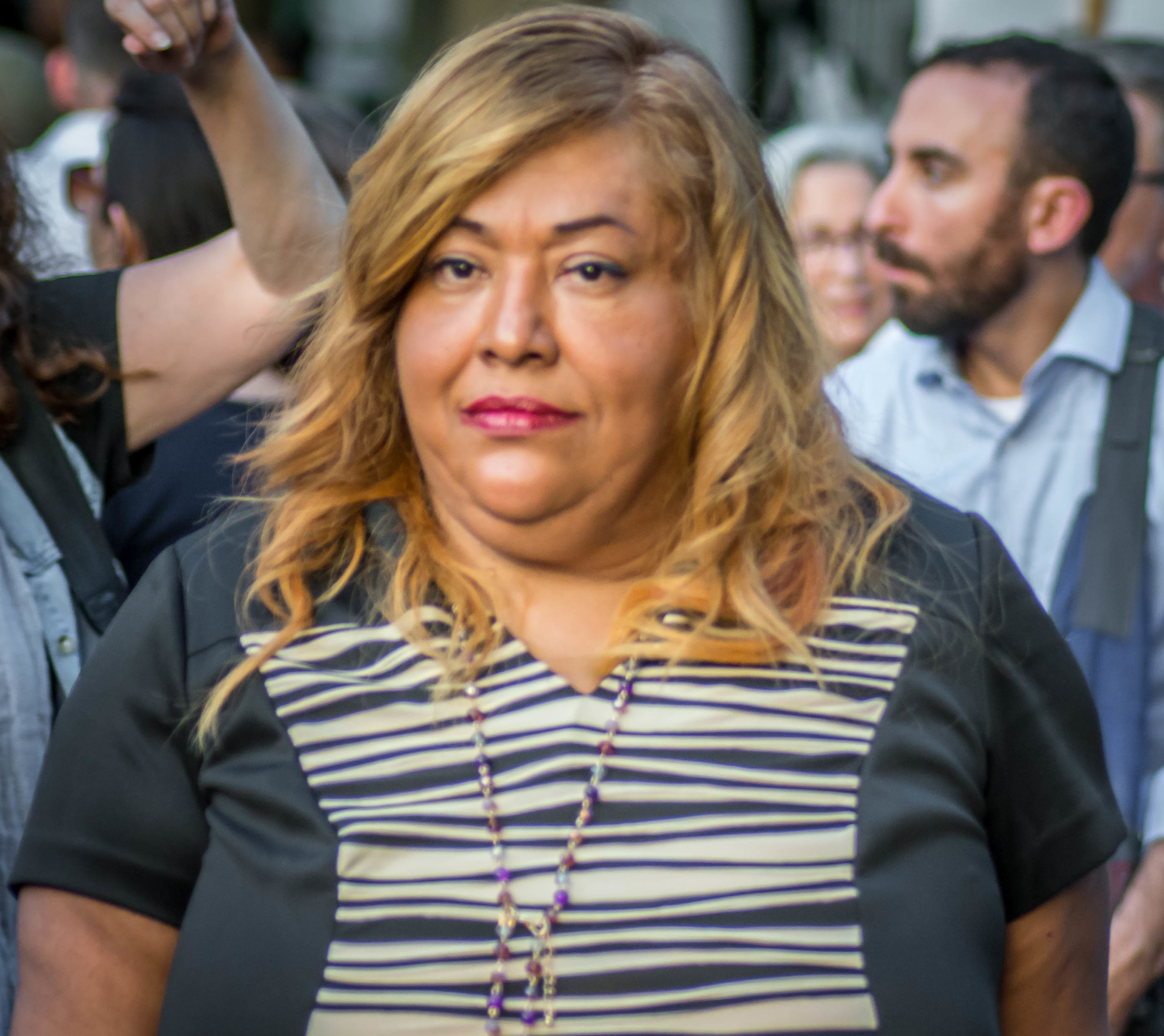
- Born: 1970 (age 55–56); San Salvador, El Salvador
- Occupation: Activist

Ruby Corado (born in San Salvador, El Salvador) is an activist who founded Casa Ruby, a bilingual, multicultural LGBTQ organization in Washington, D.C. Established in 2012, Casa Ruby identifies its mission as "to create success life stories among Transgender, Genderqueer, and Gender Non-conforming Gay, Lesbian and Bisexual people." In July 2022, Corado was accused of mismanagement of Casa Ruby, which forced the organization to cease operations.

== Early life ==
Corado migrated to America at the age of sixteen to escape the civil war in El Salvador. She settled in Washington, D.C., on her own. As a member of the LGBT community as well as a young immigrant, Corado found it challenging to adapt to her new community. She found the move and settlement difficult and discovered how meager the resources were for the LGBTQ+ community within Washington, D.C. This was one of her first motivators to be a part of creating a welcoming community for transgender people and other members of the LGBTQ+ community.

After coming out as a gay man in her teens, Corado faced bullying from others for appearing to be a feminine male. In one incident, she was tormented in her school's bathroom by boys her age who followed and attacked her for being a “feminine boy.” At home, she was ostracized by her own family. Eventually, she came to terms with her identity as a transgender woman. This experience motivated her LGBTQ+ advocacy.

Due to setbacks because of her identity as a transgender woman – including homelessness, job firings, and physical violence – Corado did not begin transitioning until the 1990s, when she felt safe enough and had been living in what she had considered a well-rounded neighborhood. In 1995, the death of Tyra Hunter, a transgender woman who died of injuries sustained in a car accident after EMS personnel refused to treat her, motivated Corado to become involved in LGBTQ+ advocacy. She started volunteering at Whitman-Walker Health, a health center focused on HIV/AIDS care for LGBTQ+ patients. A few years later, once she made the transition from male to female, she won the Miss Gay El Salvador pageant, which came with the expectation of community service.

At one point, Corado worked as a sex worker to meet men without having to tell them that she was a transgender woman. She worked for an agency which would sell each encounter for $300, although this agency would take most of the profits she earned from her work as an escort. In 2008, her boyfriend at the time broke into Corado's house and sexually assaulted her, leading to emotional trauma. Despite reporting the attack, police neither investigated nor prosecuted the culprit. In the same year, there was another fight between Corado and her then boyfriend, that led to her spending a night in jail. Corado was incarcerated with men rather than with women, despite her identifying as a woman. She was forced to strip in front of the men in the jail's housing unit for men, and had to use the bathroom in front of the men in her cell.

As a result of this persecution and abuse, Corado left her day job and began heavily abusing drugs, and ended up becoming homeless. Corado struggled with suicidal thoughts while continuing her career as an activist. She sought help at a psychiatric hospital around 2011.

== Career ==
=== Transgender advocacy ===
Corado became widely known after the August 16, 2003, murder of Bella Evangelista, a 25 year old transgender Latina, who was killed during the same month which included the murder of another transgender woman in Washington, D.C. Corado helped organize daily vigils and a march to demand an end to the violence and recognition of human rights of transgender people. Corado was part of the Coalition to Clarify the D.C. Human Rights Act (later renamed the D.C. Trans Coalition), which changed the D.C. Human Rights Act to include protections for gender identity or expression, a change that took effect in March 2006.

Corado is a bilingual motivational speaker and sensitivity trainer who speaks about social justice issues pertaining to transgender people, gender-nonconforming individuals, and the rest of the LGBTQ+ community. She does motivational speaking and sensitivity training in both English and Spanish to educate members of the LGBTQ+ community who do not speak or understand English well.

Corado has spoken out against the Trump administration's consideration to define one's gender based on the genitalia that individual was born with. She has also been part of demonstrations, holding signs along the lines of "Enough" and "We will not be erased".

=== Creation of Casa Ruby ===
After enduring being a victim of the sex industry, mistreatment for being transgender, homelessness, battles to change her gender on her identification card, an almost-fatal incident of domestic violence, and lack of support and resources for the LGBTQ+ community in Washington, D.C., Corado set out to create a space to support transgender people, and prevent hate crimes from happening to other transgender people as well as others within the LGBTQ+ community. Corado sought to create a movement led by people society deemed disposable.

In June 2012, with the help of her friends and her community, Corado founded Casa Ruby, a bilingual LGBTQ+ center that helps house, treat, and support mostly LGBTQ+ youth. The first building occupied three floors of a house in Park View on Georgia Avenue NW. The organization moved to Shepherd Park in 2018.

While the center primarily aimed to serve the Latina-trans community, people of other races and gender identities of the LGBTQ+ community have relied on Casa Ruby. As of 2020, there were multiple establishments with approximately 50 employees and an outreach that affects the lives of over 6,000 people annually. Casa Ruby provides services to marginalized groups who, due to language or immigration status, may not know what resources are available for them. Casa Ruby also provides services for violence victims, supports poor members of the LGBTQ+ community, HIV risk, and testing, as well as discrimination victims, with the goal of reducing exclusion, discrimination, and discouragement for being openly LGBTQ+. Casa Ruby provides employment services, crisis intervention, support groups, English language lessons, and immigration services. Another service that they offer is a 24-hour drop-in/respite service to those who are either abandoned, homeless, or in need of a place to stay.

Their housing placement program spans far beyond their 24-hour shelter policy as well. Ruby has organized multiple housing programs that span from 24-hour open housing services that are open during weather emergencies to prevent hypothermia and other weather-related injuries to the homeless community. Casa Ruby provides short-term living placement which offers short-term consistent housing services for three to six months at a time. This program is for 18 to 24-year-olds and is created to help people transition into permanent living situations. The transitional living program offers stable housing and support for up to 18 months, to help clients find educational and foundational backing before they pursue independent living.

The “Support Services for Victims of Violence” program provides one-on-one counseling and aid to any victims that have suffered from physical, mental, or emotional abuse. Casa Ruby also offers Social Services which can connect people with Social Workers to help them attain government-issued identification and many other legal acquisitions.

In October 2021, Corado resigned from Casa Ruby following the loss of $850,000 in funding from the D.C. Department of Human Services. In July 2022, Casa Ruby closed with employees and creditors citing non-payment of wages and debts. News sources were initially unable to locate Ruby Corado for comment.

In August 2022, the DC Attorney General's office filed a civil complaint accusing Corado of transferring money from Casa Ruby's accounts into her private accounts. The Wanda Alston Foundation, a District organization serving homeless and at-risk LGBTQ+ youth, was appointed by a court to act as a receiver for Casa Ruby; following an investigation, the foundation reported that Casa Ruby had more than $2 million in debts and “no meaningful assets,” and then filed a civil complaint alleging that Corado had funneled out more than $800,000. In March 2023, the Washingtonian magazine located Corado in El Salvador and held three teleconferences over a four-hour period, during which she denied any wrongdoing and claimed that all financial transactions had been approved by Casa Ruby's board of directors, and that she had withdrawn the money to create a "self-sustaining" income that would make Casa Ruby less dependent on government funding.

== Arrest and Conviction ==
On March 5, 2024, Corado was arrested in a Laurel, Maryland hotel after an unexpected return to the United States. She was charged with diverting at least $150,000 of $1.3 million in taxpayer-backed emergency relief funds under the Paycheck Protection Program and the Economic Injury Disaster Loan Program to private bank accounts off-shore for her personal use. Charges included bank fraud, wire fraud, laundering of monetary instruments, monetary transactions in criminally derived proceeds, and failure to file a report of a foreign bank account.

On July 17, 2024, as part of a plea bargain , Corado pled guilty to one charge of wire fraud . She was later sentenced to 33 months in prison for diverting at least $150,000 that had been marked for Casa Ruby under federal COVID-relief funds to an off-shore bank account for her personal use. At the completion of her term of imprisonment, she will likely be deported to El Salvador. She was also ordered to pay over $950,000 in restitution to the Small Business Administration.

== Personal life ==
Corado married David Walker in 2014, and was walked down the aisle by Washington, D.C., Mayor Vincent C. Gray.

== Awards and recognition ==
Corado has received multiple awards and recognitions. She was included on the lists "25 Most Influential Latino LGBT activists" from Latino Voice in 2009 and "Ten LGBTQ Latinos That Make us Proud" from XQSi Magazine in 2012. She was named a Capital Pride Hero by Metro Weekly in 2005, and was included in the 2007 Latino LGBT History Project Heroes Exhibit.

Awards she has received include:

- Trans America in 2006
- Stein Democrats Heil-Balin Community Service Award in 2011
- Capital Pride Engendered Spirit Awards in 2011
- Gay And Lesbians Activists Alliance GLLA Distinguished Service Award in 2012
- The Activist Of The Year award in 2012's African American Prism Awards
- The DC Center Community Center Service Award in 2013
- Gays And Lesbians Opposing Violence Community Service Award in 2013
