= Darlene Nipper =

- Organization: National Gay and Lesbian Task Force
- Title: Deputy executive director
- Predecessor: Rea Carey
- Movement: LGBT rights movement
- Spouse: Katrina Higgins

Darlene Nipper is an American lesbian, gay, bisexual and transgender (LGBT) rights activist and the deputy executive director of the National Gay and Lesbian Task Force since 2008. She has previously worked for the city government of Washington, DC, the BET Foundation, the National Mental Health Association, and the National Alliance on Mental Illness (NAMI) - where she served as chief operating officer. She has been an "out and active lesbian who has been in a committed relationship [since 1996]."

== Personal ==
Nipper grew up in Washington, DC and was raised Catholic. She is a person of color who graduated from a historically black college. She became an ordained interfaith minister in June 2006 and mostly practices mindfulness meditation and Buddhism. In that role, she recently served as executive director of the Insight Meditation Community of Washington, DC.

She received her Bachelor of Arts in Spanish from Howard University and a Master of Science in Administration from Trinity College in Washington D.C.

== Career ==
Nipper began work professionally as a health advocate, working with those affected by HIV/AIDS, substance abuse, mental illness and other health issues. As senior director and then-vice president of public education for the National Mental Health Association, Nipper managed programs that worked with 340 mental health associations in the United States. From 1994 to 2000, she was the director of community living at the Lt. Joseph P. Kennedy Institute, a community residential services program for adults with intellectual or developmental disabilities.

In 2001, she became national director of the Multicultural and International Outreach Center of the National Alliance on Mental Illness (NAMI). Nipper founded the center to increase membership of racially and ethnically diverse people in NAMI and the cultural competency of NAMI programs. She was later appointed chief operating officer, managing the overall operations of NAMI's national office. She also coordinated depression screening and education events for the Sexual Minority Youth Assistance League and ran HIV/AIDS and substance abuse support groups for the Inner City AIDS Network in Washington, DC.

In 2004, she served as the executive director of the BET Foundation, where she oversaw a national media campaign to reduce obesity in African-American women. Right before interviewing for the position with BET, Nipper was diagnosed with breast cancer, she hesitated about going for the interview but decided she had to live her life as fully as possible, she also found out she had HER2/neu, a gene that has been shown to play an important role in the development and progression of certain aggressive types of breast cancer.

In 2005, she was appointed director of the Office of LGBT Affairs for the mayor of Washington, DC, following the murder of her friend Wanda Alston - the first person to hold the position after it was made permanent in 2004. In this role, she served as a senior advisor to mayor Anthony A. Williams on issues related to the LGBTQ community, provided key policy direction, and worked with government agencies to ensure appropriate training and consultation related to major legislative and regulatory guidelines affecting the local LGBTQ community. She also served as a facilitator for the National Youth Advocacy Coalition's Annual Summit.

Nipper then worked for Koba Associates, Inc., managing several campaigns to improve understanding and prevention of HIV/AIDS and substance abuse. She was the campaign director for the African American HIV/AIDS Education Campaign, curriculum director for the National Institute of Drug Abuse AIDS Education and Research Project, and director of Spectrum Extended Services, AIDS Outreach for Minority Communities.

Nipper has served as the deputy executive director of the National Gay and Lesbian Task Force since 2008. She has also been consulted on the historical difference in how traditionally oppressed social movements operate under the same circumstances via their networks.
