= Richard Titlebaum =

American painter

Richard Theodore Titlebaum (January 26, 1939 in Boston – 2006) was a writer, artist, antiquarian book collector and literature professor.

== Biography ==
Richard Theodore Titlebaum attended Boston Latin School, and received a B.A.(1960) and M.A. from Harvard. In 1969, he received a doctorate in English literature from Harvard University.

Titlebaum died October 9, 2006, in Ann Arbor, Michigan.

== Literary and art career ==
He taught literature at Harvard, the University of California, Berkeley, the University of Haifa and the University of the Witwatersrand.

In 1976, he decided to devote himself full-time to painting. He participated in over 300 art events in 27 states and won 48 awards. Some of Titlebaum's works were done in Surrealistic styles, often with Old Testament religious motifs. He was especially interested in Middle Eastern history and the Jewish Revolts. Many of his large paintings were donated to the Leslie Lohman Gay Art Foundation on his death and may be viewed on their website. At the end of his life, most of his work was religious in subject matter. His paintings are in the Fogg Art Museum, the Permanent Collection of the Leslie-Lohman Gay Art Foundation in New York City, Liberty University, and the Miami City Hall.

== Published works ==
His Harvard thesis, completed in 1969 but published only in 1987, is entitled: Three Victorian Views of the Italian Renaissance: John Ruskin, Walter Pater and John Addington Symonds.
