= Borjas =

Borjas is a surname. Notable people with the surname include:

- George J. Borjas (born 1950), Cuban-born American economist
- Lorena Borjas (1960–2020) Mexican-American transgender rights activist
- Melissa Borjas (born 1986), Honduran football referee
- René Borjas (1897–1931), Uruguayan football player
