= Diana Hemingway =

American LGBTQ rights activist

Diana Hemingway (1970–December 20, 2016) was an activist for trans/queer issues, sex worker rights, disability rights, economic justice, racism, and issues impacting the kink community.

== Biography ==
Hemingway's family were Irish Gypsies working the carnival circuit, traveling around the US, eventually settling in Fort Lauderdale. She worked briefly as an auto tech and code enforcer, additionally working as a sculptor, photographer, and jewelry maker.

After losing her position with a non-profit, Hemingway started working as a dominatrix and ultimately an escort. She was raped twice and saw her mental health spiral. Woolston later claimed Hemingway had undiagnosed Bipolar Disorder and felt she was becoming a burden to people around her.

=== Death ===
Hemingway died in 2016 as a result of suicide.

=== Activism ===
Hemingway founded the first South Florida chapter of SWOP.

== Awards and honors ==
She was part of the first group of honorees on the National LGBTQ Wall of Honor.
