= Mel Boozer =

American activist and sociologist (1945–1987)

- Melvin "Mel" Boozer
- Born: June 21, 1945; Washington, D.C.
- Died: March 6, 1987 (aged 41); Washington, D.C.
- Cause of death: AIDS-related illness
- Education: Dartmouth College (undergrad); Yale University (Ph.D.)
- Occupations: Professor of sociology; LGBT rights activist; President, Gay Activists Alliance of Washington, D.C.
- Known for: The first openly gay candidate for Vice President of the United States

Melvin Boozer (June 21, 1945 – March 6, 1987) was an American university professor and activist for African American, LGBTQ and HIV/AIDS issues. He was active in both the Democratic Party and Socialist Party USA.

== Biography ==
Boozer grew up in Washington, D.C., where he graduated as salutatorian of his class at Dunbar High School. Boozer attended Dartmouth College on a scholarship. He entered the university in 1963, one of only three African Americans admitted that year. Following his graduation, he studied for a Ph.D. at Yale University before becoming a professor of sociology at the University of Maryland.

In 1979, Boozer was elected president of the Gay Activists Alliance of Washington, D.C., in which office he served for two one-year terms. He was the first African American to serve as GAA president and became "a leading moderate voice among black gays nationally". While president of the GAA, the organization won unanimous passage of the Sexual Assault Reform Act by the D.C. Council, which decriminalized sodomy and repealed solicitation laws for consenting adults. Under pressure from the Moral Majority, a Christian right lobbying group, Congress exercised its power to overturn DC acts for only the second time to repeal this change. During his leadership, the GAA also saw established the right for the GAA to lay a wreath at the Tomb of the Unknowns in Arlington National Cemetery and won a court battle with the Washington Metropolitan Area Transit Authority for the right to place Metrobus posters reading "Someone in Your Life is Gay."

Boozer also wrote for BlackLight, the first national black gay periodical, founded by Sidney Brinkley.

Boozer was nominated in 1980 for the office of Vice President of the United States by the Socialist Party USA and, by petition at the convention, by the Democratic Party. He was the first openly gay person ever nominated for the office. Boozer spoke to the Democratic convention in a speech televised in prime time, calling on the party to support equality for LGBTQ people:

Would you ask me how I dare to compare the civil rights struggle with the struggle for lesbian and gay rights? I can compare them and I do compare them, because I know what it means to be called a 'nigger' and I know what it means to be called a 'faggot,' and I understand the differences in the marrow of my bones. And I can sum up that difference in one word: none.

Boozer received 49 votes before the balloting was suspended and then-Vice President Walter Mondale was renominated by acclamation.

In 1981, Boozer was hired by the National Gay Task Force as district director and a lobbyist. NGTF executive director Virginia Apuzzo fired him in 1983, replacing him with then-GAA president Jeff Levi. This had the effect of "leav[ing] the nation's oldest gay organization even whiter" and drew protests from other gay African Americans.

In 1982, he co-founded the Langston Hughes–Eleanor Roosevelt Democratic Club to advocate for black LGBTQ people in D.C., leading the club in 1983 and 1984.

Boozer died of an AIDS-related illness in March 1987 at the age of 41 in Washington, D.C. Boozer is featured in a panel of the AIDS Memorial Quilt.

In June 2019, Boozer was one of the inaugural fifty American "pioneers, trailblazers, and heroes" inducted on the National LGBTQ Wall of Honor within the Stonewall National Monument (SNM) in New York City's Stonewall Inn. The SNM is the first U.S. national monument dedicated to LGBTQ rights and history, and the wall's unveiling was timed to take place during the 50th anniversary of the Stonewall riots.
