= Josh McNey =

American photographer and creative director (born 1975)

Josh McNey (born May 15, 1975) is an American photographer and creative director.

== Life and work ==
McNey was born in Westlake Village, CA and grew up in the surrounding suburbs. McNey began photographing at an early age, taking photos of his brothers and friends while they skated and surfed. After high school McNey spent seven years in the United States Marine Corps.

In 2002 McNey moved to New York to attend Columbia University. He photographed the Columbia wrestling team while attending university. McNey's photographs have appeared in Crush, Dust, Flaunt Magazine, XLR8R, Positive Magazine, Kink Magazine, Kaltbult and Vision LA. McNey has photographed RZA, Walter Pfeiffer and Nico Muhly.

In 2011 McNey had his first solo show, called Protect from Light, at the New York gallery, Casa de Costa. McNey's work is also included in the Elton John Photography Collection and The Leslie Lohman Museum of Gay and Lesbian Art. He currently lives and works in New York City.
