= Paula Ettelbrick =

American lawyer (1955–2011)

- Born: October 2, 1955; Stuttgart, West Germany
- Died: October 7, 2011 (aged 56); Manhattan, New York City, U.S.
- Education: Northern Illinois University; Wayne State University Law School
- Occupation: Lawyer

Paula Louise Ettelbrick (October 2, 1955 – October 7, 2011) was a lawyer, based in New York City. She worked for the LGBT community, focusing on defining family to include those in the community.

== Career ==
After law school, she stayed in Detroit to work for a law firm there before moving to New York City after two years. She went to work for the Lambda Legal Defense and Education Fund. From 1988 until 1993, she was the legal director.

She went on to become executive director of the International Gay and Lesbian Human Rights Commission from 2003 until 2009, going on to serve in the same position at the Stonewall Community Foundation.

Ettelbrick was a lecturer at Barnard College's Women's Studies Department and at, New York University School of Law, she was an adjunct professor.

== Personal life ==
She was born on an American Army base to Robert and Judi Ettelbrick. She received her Juris Doctor degree from Wayne State University in 1984 and her undergraduate degree from Northern Illinois University in 1978.

Ettlebrick died of primary peritoneal cancer. She had been raising two children, Adam and Julia, with former partner Suzanne B. Goldberg. Her partner at her death was Marianne Haggerty.

== Publications ==
- Same-Sex Marriage: Are We On the Path to Liberation Now? Co-written with Julie Shapiro and in 2004, printed in the Seattle Journal for Social Justice

== Honors and awards ==
The Minority Corporate Counsel Association (MCCA) named an annual award in her honor to recognize either an individual or organization for advancing LGBT attorneys.

In 2019, she was one of fifty inaugural honorees for the National LGBTQ Wall of Honor.
