= Casa Ruby =

LGBT non-profit organization and community center in Washington, D.C.

Casa Ruby was a non-profit organization and community center in Washington, D.C., that provided housing, food, and other social services to LGBTQ people, primarily transgender, and gender queer people. Casa Ruby was founded by Ruby Corado and first opened in 2012. The organization was bilingual, providing services in both English and Spanish.

The organization ran a 50-bed emergency housing program across seven locations and a drop-in center, and, has a satellite office in El Salvador. In September 2021, Casa Ruby had over 100 employees, but its management said it would lay off more than half after the D.C. Department of Human Services (DHS) declined to renew an $850,000 grant. Corado had previously filed an administrative complaint alleging that DHS was engaged in anti-transgender discrimination. After the loss of funding, which came with five days' notice, Corado stepped down as executive director and was replaced by Alexis Blackmon. After Blackmon left the role in February 2022, Jacqueline Franco was named as interim executive director.

Casa Ruby ceased its program operations in July 2022. On August 11, 2022, it was announced that a D.C. Superior Court judge appointed an outside party to take into account all of Casa Ruby’s financial assets and determine whether there is a feasible way to continue operations.

== History ==
=== Founding ===
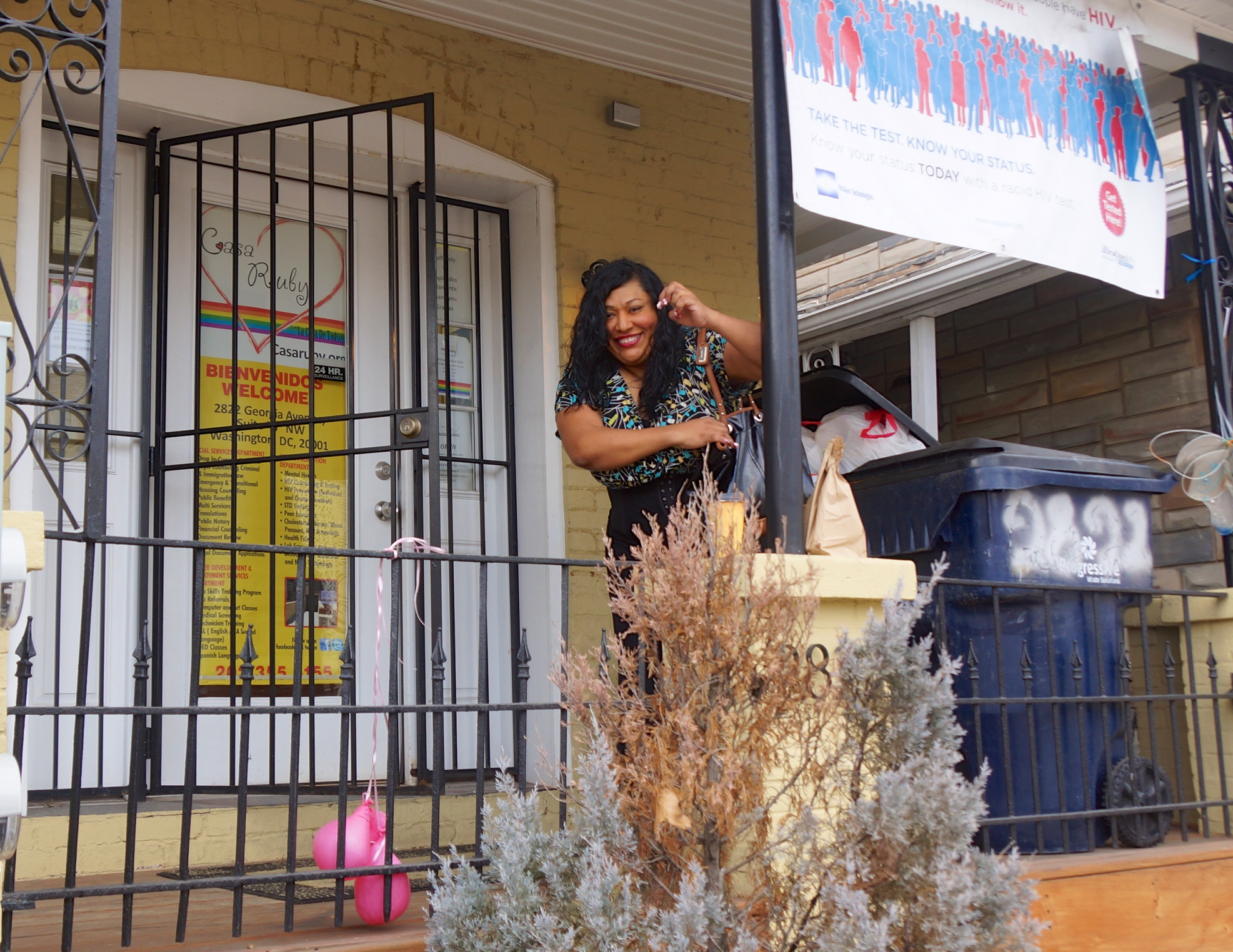
Corado in front of Casa Ruby's first location at 2822 Georgia Ave. NW

Ruby Corado initially formed a non profit called Latinos/as En Accion in 2004, which received 501(c)(3) nonprofit status in 2006. Corado officially founded Casa Ruby in 2012, as a Latino LGBT community center in a Columbia Heights brownstone at 2822 Georgia Ave. NW.

In its first two years, Casa Ruby volunteers served roughly 160 clients a week. In 2014, the organization received $261,725 a year.

=== Growth ===
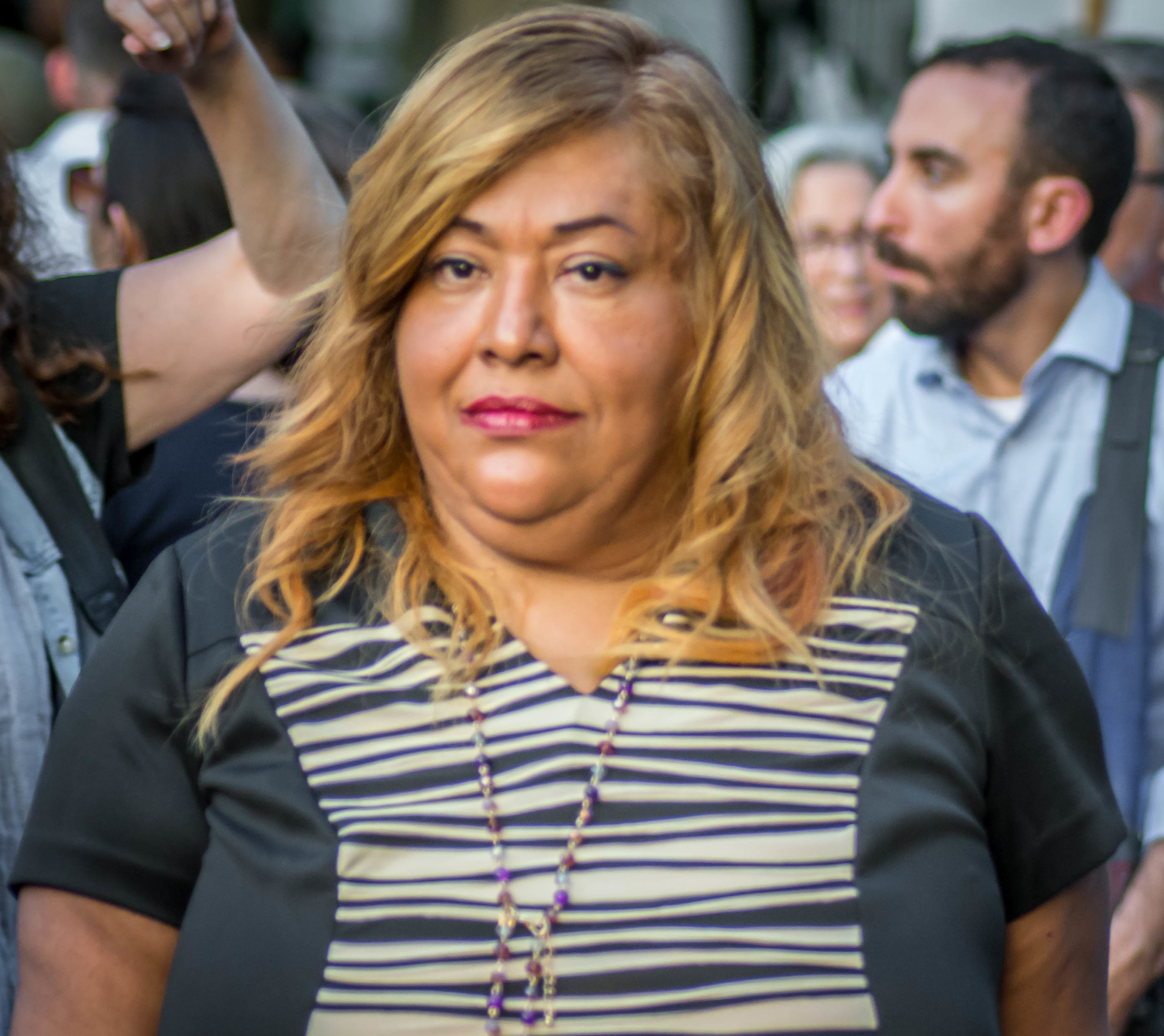
Corado in 2019

By 2019, Casa Ruby had grown to nearly $3.5 million in annual revenue. In 2020, Casa Ruby had 127 employees and almost in 4.2 million in annual revenue.

Corado opened a Casa Ruby office in San Salvador, El Salvador on March 15, 2021, in a house provided by Corado's father. Corado had fled El Salvador's civil war when she was 16 years old.

=== Loss of funding ===
In 2020, during the COVID-19 pandemic, the D.C. Department of Human Services reduced funding for nonprofits in response to Mayor Muriel Bowser's request for COVID expense cuts, including those supporting youth experiencing homelessness. Corado estimated that the cuts to Casa Ruby's funding would total more than $170,000. At the time, Casa Ruby provided services to approximately 200 LGBTQ youth and employed 126 staff and contractors.

In March 2021, Corado created a GoFundMe to support relocating Casa Ruby's headquarters from its location at 7530 Georgia Ave., NW, in response to a landlord dispute. The landlord claimed that they are not evicting Casa Ruby, but that Casa Ruby owed $450,000 in rent payments. The landlord had filed a lawsuit against Casa Ruby in 2018, alleging breach of contract and damage to the property. Casa Ruby and the landlord came to an agreement to share costs for repairs to the building, with Casa Ruby responsible for most infrastructure repairs as described in the building lease.

Also in March, Casa Ruby filed a complaint against the D.C. Department of Human Services (DHS), alleging that a high-level official engaged in "anti-transgender discrimination and retaliation against Casa Ruby."

In September 2021, the DHS declined to renew Casa Ruby's $850,000 grant, which paid for a 50-bed emergency shelter that at the time housed at least 10 people and a center for homeless LGBTQ youth and adults.

=== Arrest ===
In 2023, Ruby Corado, founder of Casa Ruby, a D.C. nonprofit serving homeless LGBTQ+ youth, was arrested by the FBI for money laundering and fraud after returning from El Salvador. Allegedly, Corado transferred over $150,000 of emergency relief funds to private accounts in El Salvador, concealing it from the IRS. Casa Ruby, which had received over $1.3 million in relief funds, ceased operations in July 2022 due to financial mismanagement. Corado denied these allegations, attributing them to her criticism of local administration and her legal complaints against the D.C. Department of Human Services.

Following the funding loss, Corado resigned as executive director and named Alexis Blackmon as the interim executive director, with a search committee forming to select a permanent executive director. At the time, Casa Ruby reported having almost 50 employees and servicing more than 6,000 homeless individuals annually. Blackmon reported that as a result of the funding loss, Casa Ruby decided to close its former Georgia Ave. headquarters.

=== Closure ===
Blackmon left the executive director position in February 2022, reporting that she was unable to access bank accounts for Casa Ruby controlled by Corado. Jacqueline Franco was named as interim executive director.

In July 2022, former employees of Casa Ruby confirmed that the organization had closed. Many of these employees reported that they had not been paid in weeks. On July 13, the District of Columbia government had ceased releasing grant money without evidence of payroll and other operational documents.

== Services and facilities ==
When it opened its first community center in 2012, Casa Ruby provided immigration assistance, HIV testing, and other services in Spanish and English.

Casa Ruby opened a new headquarters and additional client service location in Dupont Circle around 2020. Casa Ruby operated an additional three residential houses for homeless LGBTQ youth

In 2022, before closing, Casa Ruby services include Latino and immigration support, support for LGBTQ victims of violence, support for transgender and gender-nonconforming individuals, and LGBTQ mental health counseling.
