= Lorena Borjas =

Mexican-American activist (1960–2020)

- Lorena Borjas in 2019
- Born: May 29, 1960; Veracruz, Mexico
- Died: March 30, 2020 (aged 59); Brooklyn, New York, U.S.
- Occupations: Transgender and immigrant rights activist
- Years active: c. 1995–2020

Lorena Borjas (May 29, 1960 – March 30, 2020) was a Mexican-American transgender and immigrant rights activist, known as the mother of the transgender Latinx community in Queens, New York. Her work on behalf of immigrant and transgender communities garnered recognition throughout New York City and the United States. She lived for many years in the Jackson Heights neighborhood of Queens, where she was a community figure and leader.

== Early life and education ==
In 1960, Borjas was born in Veracruz, Mexico. When she was seventeen years old, she ran away from home and lived on the streets of Mexico City. She later studied public accounting in Mexico City.

== Emigration ==
In 1981, Borjas emigrated to the United States at twenty years old, with the goal of obtaining hormone therapy and transitioning to live as a woman. Taking a job in a belt factory, she initially shared an apartment in the New York City neighborhood of Jackson Heights, Queens with 20 transgender women who worked as sex workers. As a young woman, Borjas aided the women she lived with, along with other transgender sex workers. Initially, she primarily provided aid to Mexican transgender women, but she later expanded to help all Latin American trans women. As she explained,

"We were women without families and who had run away from our countries, persecuted for expressing our identity, for being ourselves. Here in New York, we did not have the life and freedom we had been dreaming about. We also endured violence and abuse here. In those days, it was a real crime to be a transgender immigrant of color.”

In 1986, Borjas was granted amnesty, under the Immigration Reform and Control Act of 1986. In 1990, Borjas became a legal permanent resident of the United States. In 2019, Borjas became a U.S. citizen.

== Challenges ==
Borjas experienced many challenges in the 1990s. She became addicted to crack cocaine. As a result, she began to engage in riskier sex work. She ultimately found herself in a relationship in which she was a victim of sex trafficking. She was arrested many times during this period, which made her ineligible for green card renewal or naturalization. In the late 1990s, she escaped from the abusive relationship and overcame her drug addiction.

Borjas was HIV-positive, and she saw many of her friends pass away due to HIV-related illnesses.

== Activism ==
In 1995, Borjas decided to make activism her life's work. For decades, Borjas worked to protect transgender victims of human trafficking (which she herself had experienced), slavery, and violence. She hosted women who had been ostracized from their families in her own apartment until they were able to support themselves. She walked the streets seeking women who needed her help, providing condoms and food, and connecting these women to social services. She worked without pay to facilitate access to HIV testing and hormone therapy for transgender sex workers, including setting up a weekly HIV testing clinic in her home, and providing syringe exchanges for women taking hormone injections. In 1995, she organized her first march in support of the transgender community.

As reflected by Cecilia Gentili, a friend and a transgender leader:

"Needed a lawyer? Doctor? Housing? A job? She was there. Lorena was that person who, if you got arrested, you called her at three in the morning and she would answer. First thing in the morning she would be in court with a lawyer to get you out of jail."

Borjas became involved in local nonprofit organizations as well. She first came to the Sylvia Rivera Law Project as a client. She eventually began working for the project on immigration and criminal justice issues. With Chase Strangio, Borjas founded the Lorena Borjas Community Fund in 2011, which provides bail assistance to LGBT defendants. The fund has allowed over 50 people to get out of jail. She became a counselor for the Community Healthcare Network's Transgender Family Program, where she worked to obtain legal aid for victims of human trafficking.

During the coronavirus pandemic, Borjas created and promoted a mutual aid fund, via GoFundMe, to help transgender people who were impacted by the economic crisis.

Borjas was not paid for the majority of her activism. She supported herself through a variety of jobs, including counseling sessions, community outreach, occasional talks, and cleaning houses.

Borjas founded Colectivo Intercultural Transgrediendo: the first community organization for TransGNB (Transgender and Gender Non-Binary) and LGBTQI people in Queens that advocates for TransGNB rights.

Her life project was to create a safe space for TGNCNB (Transgender, Gender non-conforming, and Non-Binary) people in Queens, however, due to her death, she was unable to execute this dream. Liaam Winslet (Executive Director, Colectivo Intercultural Transgrediendo) is helping to bring this dream to reality, known as Casa Trans Lorena Borjas.

== Awards and honors ==
Borjas earned honors from former Mayor David Dinkins, New York Attorney General Letitia James, and Queens District Attorney Melinda Katz. In 2019, she was declared a New York Woman of Distinction in the State Senate. Following her death, New York City Council member Francisco Moya announced plans to rename a street in his district after her. On the anniversary of her death in 2021, Baxter Avenue on 83rd street—where Borjas lived and worked—was renamed to Lorena Borjas Way.

In June 2020, Borjas was added among American “pioneers, trailblazers, and heroes” on the National LGBTQ Wall of Honor within the Stonewall National Monument (SNM) in New York City’s Stonewall Inn. The SNM is the first U.S. national monument dedicated to LGBTQ rights and history.

== Legal issues ==
In 1994, Borjas was arrested and found guilty of facilitating a crime in the fourth degree, a charge dating back to her early years in the U.S., when Borjas was, in fact, a victim of trafficking and forced prostitution. She lost the immigration status she had gained under a 1986 amnesty law and lived under the threat of deportation. Starting in 2010, Borjas sought to have her own criminal record expunged, with the legal support of the Transgender Law Center. In recognition of her community activism, she was granted a pardon in 2017 by New York governor Andrew Cuomo, restoring her status as a legal immigrant, an outcome she had considered "farfetched and nearly impossible."

== Death ==
Borjas died at Coney Island Hospital on March 30, 2020, aged 59, from complications of COVID-19. She received memorials and tributes online from many public figures, including Chase Strangio, Alexandria Ocasio-Cortez, Letitia James, Corey Johnson, and Monica Roberts. A funeral service was organized by friends and loved ones via Zoom, due to social distancing restrictions, with about 250 people in attendance.
