= Charles Leslie (art collector) =

American art collector and activist

Charles Leslie is an American art collector, gay rights activist and founder of the Leslie-Lohman Museum of Art.

== Biography ==
Born in Deadwood, South Dakota, Leslie was stationed in Heidelberg, Germany, during the Korean War. In Heidelberg, he first met with the works of sexologist Magnus Hirschfeld. After he was released from duty, Leslie toured Europe with the Lotte Goslar Pantomime Circus for a few years. Afterwards he enrolled in the Sorbonne. When Leslie returned to the United States, he joined the touring production of Tennessee Williams’s Suddenly Last Summer play.

Charles Leslie met Fritz Lohman (1922–2010) in 1962. Leslie was a performance artist at that time. They were introduced to each other at a brunch with friends. Charles Leslie and Fritz Lohman, held their first homoerotic art show in their SoHo loft in May 1969. Since then their loft is called "Phallus Palace".

== Literature ==
- Clarke, Kevin (May 1, 2015). The Art of Looking: The Life and Treasures of Collector Charles Leslie. Bruno Gmuender. ISBN 9783867877633.
