= Bloodroot (restaurant) =

Coordinates: 41°9′25.922″N 73°13′9.192″W

- Interactive map of Bloodroot

Restaurant information
- Established: 1977
- Owners: Noel Furie and Selma Miriam
- Food type: Vegetarian
- Location: 85 Ferris Street, Bridgeport, Connecticut, 06605
- Website: https://www.bloodroot.com/

Bloodroot was a vegetarian restaurant and feminist bookstore in Bridgeport, Connecticut. It was established in 1977 by the Bloodroot Collective with radical and lesbian feminist principles; Bloodroot closed in December 2025. It was one of hundreds of feminist restaurants that existed in the United States in the 1970s and 1980s.

== History ==
=== Bloodroot Collective ===
Selma Miriam (then Selma Bunks), Sam Stockwell, Betsey Beavan, Noel Furie (then Noel Giordano), and Pat Shea met through the Westport chapter of the National Organization for Women and consciousness raising groups in the 1970s. In 1975, Miriam, Stockwell, Shea, and Beavan operated a cooperative exchange group out of Miriam's house, eventually forming the Bloodroot Collective in 1977. Stockwell left and Furie joined the collective soon after it was formed.

In 2010, Furie and Miriam donated their personal papers and Bloodroot's organizational papers to the Yale University Library. Miriam died in February 2025.

== Operations ==
Bloodroot was located in a residential area, which, according to Miriam, helped the rent stay affordable. This lack of foot traffic caused the restaurant to rely heavily on word of mouth and other forms of advertising to sustain it.

Bloodroot served seasonal vegan and vegetarian food. Miriam states that their purpose is not to serve health food, but "really delicious ethnic food that tastes like comfort food." Furie describes the food as a "wonderful ethnic exchange," because they serve dishes from all over the world. The founders view their food as integral to their feminism.

The restaurant operated by self-service. Customers place their order and pay, find a place to sit, and are called to the counter to pick up their meal when it's ready. When finished, customers bus their own dishes. The restaurant had women-only nights to allow lesbians a safe place to meet.

In November 2025, Bloodroot announced that they would be closing for good on December 21, 2025.

=== Philosophy ===
Bloodroot was founded because the collective members wanted "a women's center and a way of living that would be self supporting and not dependent on grants and fundraising," and "honest, satisfying work." Maria McGrath describes the business as "a lesbian hang-out; a center of feminist activism and culture; a training ground for female cooks and businesswomen; and an exemplar of re-conceived capitalism based on egalitarian producer and consumer interactions." The founders rely on community support.

=== Events ===
Bloodroot has sponsored readings by feminist authors such as Barbara Smith, Mary Daly, Susanna J. Sturgis, and Beth Brant. In the 1990s, the women of Bloodroot ran several workshops for the W.I.T.C.H. Feminist Lecture Series like "The Personal and the Political" and "Food for Body and Spirit." Furie and Miriam participated in Slow Food Connecticut's Heirloom Tasting Feast in 2004, 2006, and 2008. They also host a yearly anniversary party which hosts attendees who have been going to Bloodroot for more than 45 years.

== Reception ==
Vegetarian Times writer Jim Mason described the restaurant as "a gourmet vegetarian restaurant for real" with an "every-changing menu of dishes from its collective kitchen." In 1985, Hartford Courant's Northeast Magazine restaurant reviewers, Jane and Michael Stern, rated Bloodroot as 2/3 stars, noting that the soups are "especially outstanding" and that the atmosphere "reminds... [them] of a beatnik coffeehouse." Frank Cohen describes the restaurant as "attractive, homey, upbeat, quirky, and full of interesting knickknacks and ideological postings." In 1997, food critic Bill Daley reviewed Bloodroot in Northeast Magazine; he gave the restaurant 3/4 stars, saying it "offers sturdy, homey fare that transcends ideology. Foodies of all stripes can rejoice." Daley also picked Bloodroot as the best vegetarian restaurant in his 2000 Special Restaurant Guide.

Connecticut Magazine's yearly experts' picks for the top vegan/vegetarian restaurants in the state has featured Bloodroot from 2015 to 2019.

=== In popular culture ===
Bloodroot, Furie, and Miriam were the subject of the Douglas Tirola's 2019 documentary Bloodroot. It premiered at the San Francisco International Film Festival in April 2019. The restaurant is profiled in Annie Laurie Medonis's 2025 short documentary A Culinary Uprising: The Story of Bloodroot. Lagusta Yearwood runs several feminist vegan anarchist chocolate shops and cafes with sweets named after the founders of bloodroot. Yearwood's Confectionery!, a vegan candy shop in New York, sells Furious Vulva bonbons and Selma's Peppermint Patties, named after Furie and Miriam.

== The Political Palate ==
In 1980, the Bloodroot Collective prepared to publish their first cookbook, The Political Palate: A Feminist Vegetarian Cookbook. Crossing Press offered to publish it if the title was changed, but the Collective refused and they self-published the cookbook under their own press Sanguinaria Publishing. It contains recipes along with excerpts of works by feminist poets, theorists, and authors. Other cookbooks include The Second Seasonal Political Palate (1984), The Perennial Political Palate (1993), and The Best of Bloodroot (2007). They have continued to publish more books.
