= Leslie-Lohman Museum of Art =

Visual art museum in New York City

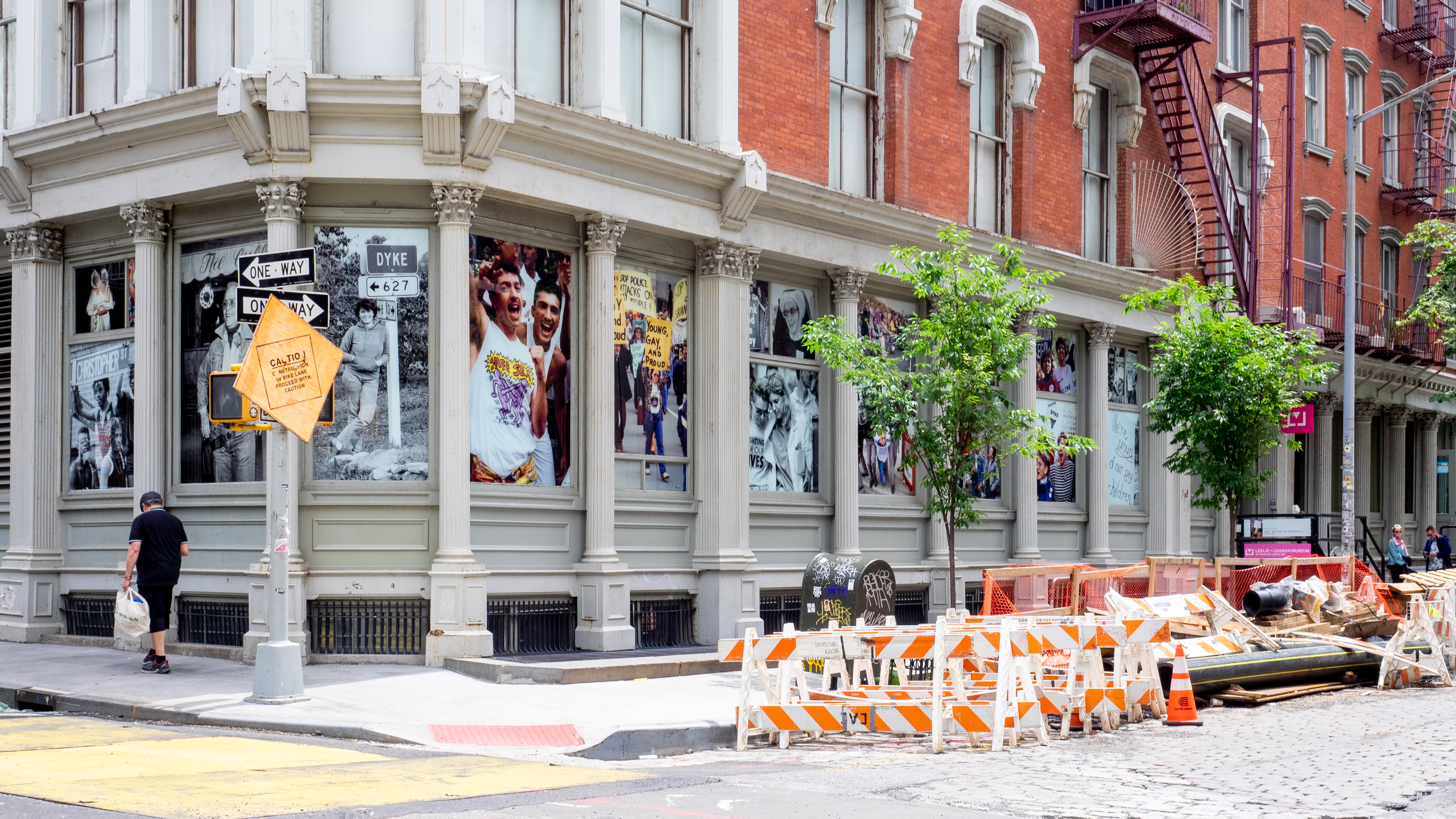
- Former name: Leslie-Lohman Museum of Gay and Lesbian Art
- Established: 2016
- Location: 26 Wooster Street, New York City, New York
- Coordinates: 40°43′18″N 74°00′11″W
- Type: Art museum
- Accreditation: American Alliance of Museums
- Collection size: 30,000
- Founders: Charles W. Leslie; J. Frederic Lohman
- Executive director: Alyssa Nitchun
- Owner: Leslie-Lohman Gay Art Foundation
- Website: www.leslielohman.org

The Leslie-Lohman Museum of Art (LLMA), formerly the Leslie-Lohman Museum of Gay and Lesbian Art, is a visual art museum in SoHo, Lower Manhattan, New York City. It mainly collects, preserves and exhibits visual arts created by LGBTQ artists or art about LGBTQ+ themes, issues, and people. The museum, operated by the Leslie-Lohman Gay Art Foundation, offers exhibitions year-round in numerous locations and owns more than 22,000 objects, including, paintings, drawings, photography, prints and sculpture. Stamatina Gregory is Head Curator and Director of Exhibitions and Collections at the Leslie-Lohman Museum of Art. The foundation was awarded Museum status by the New York State Board of Regents in 2011 and was formally accredited as a museum in 2016. The museum is a member of the American Alliance of Museums and operates pursuant to their guidelines. As of 2019, the LLMA was the only museum in the world dedicated to artwork documenting the LGBTQ experience.

The museum maintains a Permanent Collection into which more than 1,300 objects have been accessioned. The Permanent Collection contains works by a number of well-known gay artists such as Berenice Abbott, Abel Azcona, David Hockney, Ingo Swann, Catherine Opie, Andy Warhol, Tom of Finland, Delmas Howe, Jean Cocteau, David Wojnarowicz, Robert Mapplethorpe, George Platt Lynes, Horst, Duncan Grant, James Bidgood, Duane Michals, Charles Demuth, Don Bachardy, Attila Richard Lukacs, Jim French, Del LaGrace Volcano, Paul Thek, Peter Hujar, Arthur Tress, Josh McNey, Olaf Odegaard, and many others.

== Background ==
The Leslie-Lohman Gay Art Foundation was founded by J. Frederic "Fritz" Lohman and Charles W. Leslie. The two men had been collecting art for several years, and mounted their first exhibition of gay art in their loft on Prince Street in New York City in 1969. They opened a commercial art gallery shortly thereafter, but this venue closed in the early 1980s at the advent of the AIDS pandemic.

In 1987, the two men applied for nonprofit status as a precursor to establishing a foundation to preserve their collection of gay art and continue exhibition efforts. The Internal Revenue Service objected to the word "gay" in the title of the foundation and held up the nonprofit application for several years. The foundation was granted nonprofit status in 1990.

The Leslie-Lohman Gay Art Foundation's first location was in a basement at 127B Prince Street in New York City. In 2006, the foundation moved into a ground floor gallery at 26 Wooster Street in historic SoHo. The museum was closed for an expansion between October 2016 and March 2017.

== Programs ==
The museum offers several principle programs, including the maintenance of its Permanent and Study Collections, 6–8 annual exhibitions at 26 Wooster Street, 4–6 annual exhibitions in the Wooster Street Windows Gallery, and multiple weekend exhibitions and drawing workshops at its Prince Street Project Space at 127b Prince Street in SoHo. The museum's exhibitions are organized by Guest Curators who submit proposals which are reviewed by the museum director and Exhibition Committee.

In addition, the museum offers a complete year-round schedule of educational programing, including talks, lectures (Slava Mogutin, Duane Michals, Catherine Opie, Jonathan David Katz, etc.), films and books signings. The LLGAF also publishes The Archive made available to its membership that includes information on the Leslie-Lohman collection, new acquisitions, events, and articles on artists and exhibitions. The museum has a library with more than 2,500 volumes on gay art and maintains files on more than 2,000 individual artists. The museum has begun to travel its exhibitions as its 2013 Sascha Schneider exhibition traveled to the Schwules Museum in Berlin. The museum's Classical Nude: The Making of Queer History was on preview at the ONE National Gay & Lesbian Archives gallery in West Hollywood in the summer of 2014.

The museum makes objects in its collection available for loan to qualified organizations and in recent years has borrowed works from other institutions, including the Library of Congress, Smithsonian Institution. New York Public Library, The Andy Warhol Museum, and other organizations.

== Governance and finances ==
The Leslie-Lohman Museum is governed by an independent Board of Directors. The foundation employs a full-time staff, and relies on the assistance of volunteers to implement its programs. The museum also runs a Fellowship Program. It is financed by its endowment, contributions from private donors and foundations as well as a membership program. The foundation expands its collection primarily by donations from artists and collectors.

== Exhibits ==
- Deliciously Depraved: Featuring the Hun and Michael Kirwan, plus Howard Cruse, Adam, and Rob Clarke (March 18, 2003 - April 19, 2003)
- Becoming Men: Portrait Paintings by Gilbert Lewis (March 9, 2004 - April 17, 2004)
- Allure: Painted and Drawn Visions of Beauty (September 10, 2004 - October 16, 2004)
- Dirty Little Drawings: Tunnel of Love (October 21, 2004 - October 24, 2004)
- Blade: A Renegade Artist in an Era of Repression (November 13, 2004 - December 18, 2004)
- 21st Century Queer Men: Artists on the Edge (February 18, 2005 - February 26, 2005)
- Illegal to See: A Portrait of Hustler Culture by Photographer Amos Badertscher (March 15, 2005 - April 23, 2005)
- 21st Century Queer Women: Susan Synarski, Lorell Butler, Lorraine Inzalaco (May 17, 2005 - June 25, 2005)
- Indiscreet: Candid views by Stephen Hale (September 13, 2005 - October 15, 2005)
- PINUPMEN: Images of Desire (November 22, 2005 - December 23, 2005)
- Joseph Cavalleri: Stained/Painted Glass (January 10, 2006 - February 25, 2006)
- Berlin on Berlin (January 20, 2006 - February 25, 2006)
- The Culture of Queer: A Tribute to J.B. Harter (May 2, 2006 - July 1, 2006)
- Les Images: The Art of Peter Finsch (September 12, 2006 - October 21, 2006)
- Duncan Grant: Ivory & Ebony (November 7, 2006 - December 21, 2006)
- Richard Bruce Nugent: Harlem Butterfly (November 7, 2006 - December 21, 2006)
- Eric Rhein: A Journey Among Warriors (November 7, 2006 - December 21, 2006)
- Boy Bordello (January 2007 - February 17, 2007)
- Dirty Little Drawings (February 6, 2007 - February 11, 2007)
- Stations: A Gay Passion (March 18, 2007 - April 21, 2007)
- Dark Ride: A Nocturnal Journey into the World of Erotic Desire (May 8, 2007 - June 30, 2007)
- Selected Works of JB Harter (September 18, 2007 - October 20, 2007)
- Great Gay Photo Show (January 15, 2008 - February 12, 2008)
- Art Actually !: Drawing, Painting and Sculpture (March 12, 2008 - January 19, 2008)
- Pink & Bent: Art of Queer Women (May 21, 2008 - June 28, 2008)
- The Line of Fashion (September 23, 2008 - November 1, 2008)
- Imaginary Portraits: Gay Lovers in History (November 18, 2008 - December 20, 2008)
- Images from the Triangle: The AIDS Paintings of Peter Harvey (November 18, 2008 - December 20, 2008)

== See also ==
- LGBT culture in New York City
