= Dolores Alexander =

American activist, writer, and reporter

- Born: Dolores DeCarlo; August 10, 1931; Newark, New Jersey, United States
- Died: May 13, 2008 (aged 76); Palm Harbor, Florida, United States
- Education: New York University City College of New York
- Occupation: Journalist
- Organization(s): National Organization for Women; Women Against Pornography
- Known for: Women's rights activist
- Movement: Women's liberation
- Partner: Jill Ward (1971-1977)

Dolores Alexander (August 10, 1931 – May 13, 2008) was an American journalist and lesbian feminist best known for her work as executive director in the National Organization for Women (NOW) from 1969 to 1970, as co-owner of the feminist restaurant Mother Courage from 1972 to 1977, and co-founder of Women Against Pornography (WAP) in 1979.

== Early life and education ==
Dolores Alexander was born on August 10, 1931 in Newark, New Jersey, to factory workers Dominick DeCarlo and Sally née Koraleski. She attended Roman Catholic schools in New Jersey and worked as an office clerk for Equitable after graduating high school.

Despite her father's wishes, Alexander enrolled at New York University, where she met Aaron Alexander, who was enrolled in an education master's program. They married in 1950, but divorced after 5 years.

In 1961, she graduated from City College of New York with a Bachelor of Arts in Language and Literature. During her senior year she worked at The New York Times as a stringer for 10 months, gaining experience in journalism and her first taste of sexism within the news field: while applying for positions at the Times, she was not hired as a "copy girl" by a male employee because it would "cause a revolution in the newsroom".

== Journalism ==
Upon graduation, she worked as a reporter, copy editor, and bureau chief at the Newark Evening News from 1961 to 1964. She then went on to serve as a reporter, copy editor, and assistant women's editor at Newsday, also serving as a feature writer for the publication's weekend magazine until 1969.

== Feminism ==
Until that time, I had always felt like a weirdo, the only person who felt out of step with the world around her. I knew we needed a women's movement. This is what I had been waiting for. – Dolores Alexander, 2007.

In 1966, while working at Newsday, Alexander came across a press release announcing the creation of a new women's rights organization: the National Organization for Women (NOW). She interviewed Betty Friedan and, with her media experience, she became chair of the Monitor Subcommittee of the National Task Force on Image of Women in Mass Media. Upon returning to Newsday, Alexander signed up every woman in the newsroom, even offering to pay the $5 dues for women who could not afford to become members.

In December 1968, Alexander proposed a new position in NOW, the Executive Director, who would set up a New York office to answer mail, put out a newsletter, and do other organizational work for NOW. Alexander quit her job at Newsday and began working as the Executive Director officially in February 1969. Alexander intended for the Executive Director position to be a part-time job so she could work on freelance writing to supplement her income, but the workload ended up taking up all of her time.

During this period, the presence of lesbians in the National Organization for Women was becoming more visible to both its members and to the press. Alexander and other members of NOW recall Rita Mae Brown attending a meeting of the New York City chapter around December 1968 and referring to herself as “your local neighborhood lesbian”, startling the group. A few months later, Ivy Bottini, then President of New York City NOW, told Alexander the reason she left her husband was that she was a lesbian. Bottini also encouraged Alexander to hire Rita Mae Brown for an open position in NOW’s national office. Alexander hired Brown and reassured Bottini that they’d still be friends without resolving her own feelings about lesbianism.

After returning from a picket at the White House in Washington, DC, Alexander spoke with Brown about her relationship with Jean Faust, a prominent member of New York City NOW. During the course of their conversation, Alexander ended up taking Brown to bed, but their relationship ended soon after when Alexander heard Brown discussing her plans with Anselma Dell’Olio to seduce Betty Friedan and Muriel Fox. The idea was that if Friedan and Fox had lesbian experiences, they would be more open to discussing lesbianism in the feminist movement.

To this point, Alexander and Friedan were friends as much as colleagues, so Alexander decided she should tell Friedan about what she overheard. Alexander explained that Friedan’s recent divorce, coupled with her love of flattery, would make it easy for Anselma Dell’Olio to seduce. At first, Friedan was a bit outraged but amused to hear about the conversation, but after receiving multiple calls from Dell’Olio, she became more seriously concerned about lesbians in NOW. Brown soon resigned from her position.

After these events, Alexander and Friedan’s relationship became more and more strained until they could no longer work with one another without Friedan screaming. In February 1970, the Board of NOW reduced Alexander’s job duties as a way to limit her interactions with Friedan. However, Alexander understood this as a precursor to her being fired a few months later due largely to Friedan’s insistence that Alexander be fired because she was a lesbian. In March, at the national conference, Alexander was officially relieved of her duties, and the NOW National Office was moved to Chicago, although Alexander continued working as Executive Director until May, when she officially resigned.

Alexander continued to lecture about women's rights and worked with the New Feminist Talent Collective, which was formed by Jacqueline Ceballos to provide the services of speakers about the women's movement. She co-founded and organized Women Against Pornography and worked with the New York Radical Feminists. Alexander served as a board member for the National Association for Repeal of Abortion Laws, an advisory board member for the New York NOW chapter, and was a member of the New York Newspaper Women's Club. Alexander was a notable figure in numerous events in the women's movement. She helped end the practice of gender-segregated want ads in The New York Times, was witness to the lesbian purge of the National Organization for Women, participated in 1977's National Women's Conference in Houston, and the UN's Fourth World Conference on Women in Beijing in 1995

=== Mother Courage ===
Mother Courage manager Joyce Vinson, co-founders Jill Ward and Dolores Alexander, and co-manager Rosemary Gaffney, celebrate the restaurant's 3rd anniversary

In May 1972, Alexander and Jill Ward opened Mother Courage, the first feminist restaurant in the United States in Greenwich Village, New York. Located on 342 West 11th Street, the restaurant was named after the heroic female protagonist, Mother Courage, from Bertolt Brecht's drama Mother Courage and Her Children. Since the two women had no prior restaurant experience, they borrowed money from several feminist friends and colleagues to renovate an old luncheonette called Benny's Soda Luncheonette and Delicatessen. With the help of many friends and Ward's father, Alexander and Ward completely remodeled the location and turned it into an entirely new restaurant.

Every night for the first couple of weeks of Mother Courage's opening, Ward and Alexander explained their restaurant was at near capacity for dinner. They explained in their press release that, "...Mother Courage had become the hangout and gathering place of feminists around the city. Women felt comfortable coming in for dinner alone, certain they would run into at least one other person they knew and could dine with." This comfort was due to the fact that while the restaurant was technically co-ed, women took priority. After Mother Courage was granted their beer and wine license in 1973, Joyce Vinson (one of the later managers of the restaurant), explained that as a feminist, she would only give the first sip of wine to women even if accompanied by male guests. Checks were also placed within equal distance of diners in order to not make any assumptions about who was going to pay for the meal. Diners, however, weren't the only people to experience this feminist set of ethics. Mother Courage made sure to pay each worker the same salary and had each position rotate amongst staff so that "every woman [had] an appreciation of the problems of every other woman."

On May 19, 1975, Mother Courage celebrated its third birthday by hosting a champagne buffet with a cake in the shape of the venus symbol. Over 100 guests were invited (many of whom are famous feminists), including Gloria Steinem, Audre Lorde, Kate Millett, and more. Even though Mother Courage was only open until 1977, it inspired many other feminist restaurants to open up around the country. Author Lucy Komisar once described Mother Courage as "more than a restaurant, this is part of a social movement."

== Death and legacy ==
As Alexander's health declined, she stepped back from the movement spotlight, preferring to watch a new generation of activists "lead the change". On May 13, 2008, she died in Palm Harbor, Florida.

Her papers are held in the Sophia Smith Collection at Smith College and the Schlesinger Library at Harvard University.
