= Mother Courage (restaurant) =

- Interactive map of Mother Courage

Restaurant information
- Established: 1972
- Location: 342 West 11th Street, New York, New York, United States
- Coordinates: 40°44′08″N 74°00′29″W

Mother Courage was a feminist restaurant located at 342 West 11th Street in Greenwich Village in New York City. It was the first known feminist restaurant in the United States.

== History ==
With the help of $10,000 crowdsourced micro-loans and personal savings, women's rights activists and lesbian couple Dolores Alexander and Jill Ward established Mother Courage in May 1972. It was named after the title character in the play Mother Courage and Her Children by anti-war Marxist poet, Bertolt Brecht.

It was the first known feminist restaurant in the United States.

== Description and influence ==
Mother Courage was a hub for the women's liberation movement of the 1970s. It was a DIY affair, a renovated dilapidated luncheonette transformed with the help of a volunteer construction crew of family and friends in the women's liberation movement, and decorated with house plants and sketches by local feminist artists and the menu written on a chalkboard. Clientele ran the gamut politically, and men were welcome but not prioritized over female patrons. Well-known patrons included Susan Brownmiller, Gloria Steinem, Audre Lorde, and Kate Millett. The restaurant played host to readings and other cultural events.

It closed in 1977 but inspired many other feminist restaurants throughout the United States and Canada.

== See also ==
- Feminism in the United States
