= Wanda Alston =

American feminist, LGBTQ activist and government official

Wanda Alston (April 7, 1959 – March 16, 2005) was an American feminist, LGBT activist, and government official. She was born in Newport News, Virginia.

In the 1990s, Alston served in the National Organization for Women (NOW) as an executive assistant. She was also a co-leader in 1995 at the UN World Conference on Women in Beijing. She was a political organizer for five marches in Washington, D.C., and San Francisco. She was an elected member of NOW's National Board of Directors. Alston also worked as a political consultant and was active in the Democratic Party. She also worked as an events organizer with the Human Rights Campaign. She was active in the recovery movement in Washington, D.C. Alston was an active member of her local church, Unity of Washington.

Alston was also a leader in the LGBT community and was the acting director of the Washington, D.C., Office of Lesbian, Gay, Bisexual and Transgender Affairs from 2004 until her death.

Alston died on March 16, 2005, as a result of a homicide in her home in Washington, D.C. She was stabbed to death. Her killer, William Parrott Jr., pleaded guilty to second degree murder and was sentenced to 24 years in prison.

In June 2019, Alston was one of the inaugural fifty American “pioneers, trailblazers, and heroes” inducted on the National LGBTQ Wall of Honor within the Stonewall National Monument (SNM) in New York City’s Stonewall Inn. The SNM is the first U.S. national monument dedicated to LGBTQ rights and history, and the wall's unveiling was timed to take place during the 50th anniversary of the Stonewall riots.

== The Wanda Alston Foundation ==
The Wanda Alston Foundation is the only housing program in Washington DC solely dedicated to offering pre-independent transitional living and support services to homeless or at-risk LGBTQ youth ages 16 to 24 in all eight wards. The foundation is dedicated to ensuring that LGBTQ youth have access to services that improve their overall quality of life. This is achieved through advocacy and programming. The Wanda Alston Foundation advocates for increased resources for youth while providing programs including: housing, life skills training, linkages to other social services, and capacity building assistance for other community allies.

The organization provides temporary housing of up to 18 months to LGBTQ youth in need through Wanda Alston House, a transitional housing program. The organization's Capacity Building Assistance program focuses on four key areas to improve the lives of LGBTQ youth: working with LGBTQ youth of color, understanding the transgender community, utilizing and understanding interventions and public health strategies for LGBTQ youth, and working with LGBTQ youth and their families.
