= Sean Sasser =

American educator, pastry chef and reality television personality (1968–2013)

- Born: October 25, 1968; Detroit, Michigan, U.S.
- Died: August 7, 2013 (aged 44); Washington, D.C., U.S.
- Occupations: Educator, chef, reality television personality, activist
- Spouse: Michael Kaplan (m. 2013)
- Partner: Pedro Zamora (1994)

Sean Franklin Sasser (October 25, 1968 – August 7, 2013) was an American educator, activist, pastry chef, and reality television personality best known for his appearances on MTV's The Real World: San Francisco, which depicted his relationship with fellow AIDS activist Pedro Zamora. Although not one of the original cast members himself, Sasser's relationship with Zamora was one of the focal points of that season. This included a commitment ceremony in which the two exchanged vows, considered a landmark event for television.

== Early life ==
Sean Franklin Sasser was born on October 25, 1968, in Detroit, where he grew up. When he was six, his parents divorced, after which his father, an army sergeant, was mostly absent from his life, sending a Casio watch to him every year on his birthday. (Years later his father called when Sasser was in Minneapolis, and left a message with Sasser's boyfriend, but left no number and did not call back.) Sasser's mother, Patricia Sasser, continued to raise Sasser and his younger sister. Sasser attended a private school, which he said was probably not typical of most African-American young people in urban Detroit. He later attended Cass Technical High School, a select college-preparatory magnet school.

After high school, Sasser attended the University of Chicago to study Near Eastern civilizations and become an archeologist, commenting, "I wanted to be one of the first major black archeologists to call the bluff on all this Egyptian stuff that was stolen by other cultures." However, he found himself bored and depressed, and barely completed his freshman year. Sasser dropped out of college, intending initially to take a year off. After he came out as gay to his devoutly religious mother (the daughter of a minister mother), he attempted to enlist in the United States Navy, explaining in a 1997 interview, "I didn't want to be gay anymore. I thought it would work. You know, the discipline, all that stuff." Before he could leave his home, however, a mandatory blood test revealed that the 19-year-old Sasser was HIV-positive. He decided to enroll in culinary school, as he had always been fond of cooking, and wanted to open his own restaurant.

After finishing school, Sasser found jobs cooking in local Chicago restaurants, but was too fixated on the idea of dying from AIDS. Realizing that he "needed to figure out how to keep living", he moved to San Francisco, whose greater HIV awareness and diversity allowed him to find people he more easily related to – specifically, HIV-positive people closer to his own age – which raised his spirits. Sasser joined a youth HIV-positive movement that advocated attention for adolescents with the disease, and began speaking to groups about his own experience with HIV. He subsequently assisted a support group called Bay Area Positives, for young people of color. He appeared in a number of videos on behalf of the group, including "Not Me", which aired on PBS. He was photographed by Annie Leibovitz for a national AIDS awareness campaign.

== Relationship with Pedro Zamora and The Real World ==
Sasser attended the 1993 Lesbian and Gay March on Washington, where he introduced himself to a fellow AIDS educator named Pedro Zamora. Although Sasser did not characterize his meeting Zamora as love at first sight (they were both involved with other people at the time), he was moved by Zamora's presence and conviction, recalling, "I was kind of like, 'Wow.' I had never run across someone who was as good at it as he was." Sasser encouraged Zamora to call him if Zamora ever visited San Francisco. Sasser subsequently learned that producers of The Real World were looking for an HIV-positive person to cast in the 1994 season in San Francisco, where Sasser had been living for a couple of years, and eventually learned that the person cast was Zamora, whom Sasser felt was ideal for the role.

Sasser had been living in San Francisco for a couple of years in the 1990s. When Zamora moved into the MTV loft, he and Sasser began dating. Zamora asked the show's producers for permission to go on the second date without cameras, so that he and Sasser could get to know one another in a more natural setting. After the producers allowed this, Sasser and Zamora fell in love, and their relationship became a focal point of the season. Their relationship met with the approval of Zamora's housemates and close friends, Judd Winick and Pam Ling, the latter of whom joked that Sasser and Zamora "would become the mayors of Castro Street". Winick adds that whereas Sasser was a private person who harbored the ability to pack up and leave town on short notice, Zamora's openness led them to discuss more permanent living arrangements as a couple. Sasser proposed to Zamora, and the two exchanged vows in a commitment ceremony in the loft. (This was not the first of such ceremonies to be broadcast on television; Bob Paris and Rod Jackson had such a ceremony on “The Joan Rivers Show” in the early 1990s.)

After production on The Real World ceased in June 1994, Zamora visited his family in Miami before returning to San Francisco to live with Sasser. In August 1994, Zamora was diagnosed in New York City with progressive multifocal leukoencephalopathy (PML), and was given three to four months to live. On September 3, Zamora was flown to Mercy Hospital in Miami, where his family could be close to him. His family was not accepting of Sasser, however, and because the PML gradually took away Zamora's ability to speak, Zamora was unable to explicitly communicate to them the importance of Sasser in his life. This led to confrontations between Sasser and the Zamoras, who told him that "Pedro did not need to have a lover anymore", and mostly excluded Sasser from Zamora during his final days. Zamora died on November 11, 1994. Sasser returned to San Francisco two days later. Six months after Zamora's death, he resumed his speaking engagements for LGBT and HIV issues. In 1995, he spoke at the inaugural White House AIDS conference, and was appointed by President Bill Clinton to the Presidential Advisory Council on HIV/AIDS. He moved to Atlanta in late 1995, in order to be with his boyfriend, and hoped to open a café.

In 2008 Bunim-Murray Productions produced a film, Pedro, directed by Nick Oceano, dramatizing Zamora's life. In the film, Sasser is portrayed by DaJuan Johnson. Sasser took issue with the film's portrayal of his relationship with Zamora's family. In the film, after Zamora is hospitalized in Miami, his father and brothers initially refuse to accept Sasser as Zamora's spouse, telling Sasser that their time in San Francisco is over, and attempt to keep them apart. After Zamora objects to this, Zamora's family is made to watch the video of their commitment ceremony, and accept Sasser as Zamora's husband. Sasser, who regretted not having had an opportunity to spend more time with Zamora, says that this was not what occurred in reality, saying, "I have a lot of resentment toward dealing with his family's homophobia, as well as dealing with him dying... It's troublesome. If there had been some sort of support behind our commitment ceremony... I had a hard time dealing with his family. With Pedro's death and being allowed in the hospital... I don't know. Maybe it could have helped the family deal with my presence, you know?"

== After The Real World ==
Sasser was a pastry chef at Ritz-Carlton hotel properties and head pastry chef at The Nines, a luxury hotel in Portland, Oregon. He moved to Washington, D.C. in 2012, where, as a pastry chef at a restaurant called RIS, he was praised by the Washington Blade for his homemade ice cream and sorbets. Sasser said of his work, "I want to serve desserts and pastries that people recognize and love to eat, but sometimes with an unexpected twist of surprise."

In June 2013, Sasser married Michael Kaplan, whom he had dated on and off since the 1990s, and with whom he had been living with for six years prior. While living in the District, Sasser served as a board member of the AIDS Alliance for Children, Youth and Families. He was active in youth and mentoring organizations, and he and Kaplan served as foster parents to a 4-year-old girl.

== Death and legacy ==
In July 2013, Sasser, who had been HIV-positive for 25 years, was also diagnosed with mesothelioma, a rare cancer of the lungs. Sasser had no known occupational exposure to asbestos, the primary cause of mesothelioma, though studies suggest that "chronic immunosuppression enhances susceptibility to mesothelioma." He died at his home on August 7, 2013, at the age of 44. In accordance with his wishes, his body was cremated, and his ashes spread upon places he had been or wished to visit. He is survived by his husband, Michael, mother, Patricia, and his sister, a dancer who lives in Detroit with her husband and daughter.

Sasser's relationship with Zamora is credited with breaking a taboo against showing two men in a loving, stable relationship on television. Real World: Miami cast member Dan Renzi, himself openly gay, stated, "Long before Ellen or Will & Grace showcased gay people on TV living mainstream lives, and before the magic of protease inhibitor 'cocktails' turned HIV into a manageable disease, Sasser gave a brave face to both issues and brought those taboo topics to educate millions of young Americans."

The Sean Sasser Memorial Endowment Fund at AIDS United was established in September 2013 to mobilize support for programs that improve the health outcomes for gay men of color. Sasser's widower, Michael Kaplan, is the CEO of AIDS United.

In 2013, Sasser's name was inscribed at the National AIDS Memorial Grove in San Francisco. In June 2020, his name was added to the names of American "pioneers, trailblazers, and heroes" on the National LGBTQ Wall of Honor within the Stonewall National Monument in New York City.
