= The Trials of Shazam! =

2008 comic book

Publication information
- Publisher: DC Comics
- Format: Limited series
- Publication date: October 2006 – May 2008
- No. of issues: 12
- Main character(s): Captain Marvel; Shazam; Captain Marvel Jr.

Creative team
- Written by: Judd Winick
- Artist(s): Howard Porter; Mauro Cascioli

Collected editions
- Vol 1 (1-6): ISBN 978-1401213312
- Vol 2 (7-12): ISBN 978-1401218294
- Complete series: ISBN 978-1401292294

The Trials of Shazam! is a comic book published by DC Comics from 2006 to 2008. The twelve-issue limited series, written by Judd Winick and illustrated by Howard Porter and Mauro Cascioli, was later reprinted in three paperback collections. The story was an attempt to update Captain Marvel for a modern audience. It received mixed reviews from critics and its changes to the franchise were reverted shortly after it concluded.

== Development ==
In the years leading up to the release of The Trials of Shazam, DC Comics promoted their Captain Marvel character in other comic titles to generate reader interest. The story of the limited series follows plot elements introduced in Infinite Crisis (2005), Day of Vengeance (2005), and the one-shot Brave New World (2006). Writer Judd Winick conceived the story to update the character, who was largely unchanged since his creation in the 1940s and was seen by many people as a low-quality copy of Superman; the updates included changing the character's focus from regular crimes to magical ones, removing some of the sillier elements and putting Captain Marvel Jr. in the leading role.

The art was initially done by Howard Porter, who was using a digital painting approach for the first time in his professional work. This technique meant he did not have assistance from an inker or colorist, and he was having trouble meeting his deadlines for publication. The fifth issue was delayed from February 2007 to March, and issue seven was also a month late. These troubles were compounded when he suffered a severe thumb injury on his drawing hand which required an orthopedic cast and permanently limited his feeling. Porter was replaced by Mauro Cascioli with the tenth issue, cover dated January 2008, three months after issue nine. The final issues were released bi-monthly.

The first issue sold an estimated 50,500 copies. By the final issue, sales had fallen by about half. DC reprinted the first six issues in a paperback collection in June 2007. The remaining issues were collected in a second volume released in July 2008. All twelve issues were reprinted in a single volume in 2019. If the series had been successful, there were plans for an ongoing monthly series. Instead, Winick's changes to the franchise were short-lived, being undone by a 2009 story line in JSA.

== Plot ==
Following events in Infinite Crisis where the wizard Shazam and the Rock of Eternity were destroyed, Freddy Freeman/Captain Marvel Jr. and Mary Marvel lost their powers. Captain Marvel changes his name to "Marvel", assumes Shazam's role as caretaker of the remains of the Rock of Eternity, and gives Freeman a quest to prove himself worthy of replacing Captain Marvel. Each of the six gods who contributed their powers to the hero — Solomon, Hercules, Atlas, Zeus, Achilles, and Mercury — present Freeman with a challenge. As he completes each challenge, he is granted that god's particular power. If he completes all six tasks, he will take on the name Shazam. Zareb Babak, a demoted necromancer, serves as Freeman's guide during his trials. At the same time, a dark organization known as the Council of Merlin is backing its own candidate, a Creole sorceress named Sabina. If she wins the trials, she will earn the power of Shazam instead.

Freeman and Sabina compete equally in many of the trials, eventually becoming equal in power as each earn the various powers of the gods. When Sabina kills Atlas before completing his trial, Zareb convinces Apollo to take his place among the Shazam collective of gods. Freddy is able to claim the powers of Solomon and Achilles, but Sabina steals half the power of Hercules before he can share it with Freddy, Apollo divides his power between Freddy and Sabina as he resents being forced to take on Atlas's role, and Sabina steals Mercury's full power before Freddy can claim it. The competition culminated in a large battle, with Freddy, Marvel, and the Justice League battling Sabina and an army of demons summoned by the sorcerer Merlin, with the goal of sacrificing a million souls (by turning them into demons) to force Zeus to grant Sabina his power. By being willing to sacrifice himself to save the world by throwing himself into the portal used to summon the demons, along with losing the power of Shazam as a whole rather than let Sabina possess it, Freddy proves himself worthy of the power of Zeus, and Zareb reveals himself to be Zeus in disguise. Freddy says the magic word "Shazam" and gains the full powers of Shazam.

== Reception ==
The comic book series received mixed reviews from critics, averaging 6.7 out of 10 according to review aggregator Comic Book Roundup. Both Comic Book Resources and Comics Bulletin criticized Winick's dialogue and narrative pace. Porter's artwork was criticized by Comic Book Resources as "plainly [...] a work in progress", while Comics Bulletin felt it was nice but inappropriate for an action story. Cascioli was seen as an improvement, but not enough of one to save the disappointing story.
