= The Life and Times of Juniper Lee =

American animated television series

- Main title card featuring main characters (from left to right: Monroe, Juniper, and Ray Ray)
- Genre: Action; Adventure; Fantasy; Comedy; Animated sitcom
- Created by: Judd Winick
- Written by: Judd Winick; Marsha F. Griffin; Tim McKeon; Eric Kentoff; Adam Pava; Kevin Seccia; Tom Franck; Michael Jelenic
- Directed by: Frank Squillace
- Voices of: Lara Jill Miller; Amy Hill; Kath Soucie; Carlos Alazraqui; Alexander Polinsky; Colleen O'Shaughnessey; Candi Milo; Tara Strong
- Theme music composer: Rob Cuariclia; David Lehner; Rob Lehner; Stewart Copeland
- Opening theme: "You Can't Stop the Girl"
- Composer: Stewart Copeland
- Country of origin: United States
- Original language: English
- No. of seasons: 3
- No. of episodes: 40

Production
- Executive producers: Brian A. Miller; Judd Winick
- Producers: Janet Dimon; Shareena Carlson; Frank Squillace
- Running time: 22 minutes
- Production company: Cartoon Network Studios

Original release
- Network: Cartoon Network
- Release: May 30, 2005 – May 14, 2007

The Life & Times of Juniper Lee is an American animated television series created by former MTV reality star Judd Winick for Cartoon Network and produced by Cartoon Network Studios. It premiered May 30, 2005, on Cartoon Network and ended its run on May 14, 2007.

== Premise ==
The series centers on the life of a preteen girl named Juniper Lee, who lives in Orchid Bay City. Based on Winick's adopted hometown of San Francisco, the city is a hub for magical activity and is filled with various monsters and demons, both good and evil. The magic and human worlds have been separated by an invisible, mystical shield known as "the Veil," which prevents ordinary humans from seeing any magic-related events or the creatures related to them. Juniper has recently been made the new Te Xuan Ze, the protector of the balance between the human and magical worlds.

To accomplish her task, Juniper has been magically enhanced, making her far stronger and faster than ordinary humans; her abilities include superhuman strength, speed, agility, and reflexes. She can also use several different types of spells to assist her. Maintaining the balance often interferes with her personal life, including her schoolwork and social life, but she always manages to keep everything in order.

== Production ==
The Life and Times of Juniper Lee was first announced during Cartoon Network's upfront presentation on February 26, 2004, which cited an initial premiere date of February 2005. In May 2005, Cartoon Network rescheduled the premiere date to May 30, 2005, and announced that 26 episodes had been produced or were in production. Animation Magazine announced that the series' second season would premiere on January 14, 2006.

=== Inspiration ===
Series creator Judd Winick was having dinner with his wife, a fellow cast member from The Real World: San Francisco, when they discussed the idea of "a TV show that was exactly what we wanted to see on the air." Winick and his wife "got drunk and ate burgers and in two hours came up with the idea for a show that centered on an 11-year-old Asian American girl who has to protect humanity from the monsters that others can't see around them."

Winick has stated that Juniper Lee was inspired by both The Simpsons and Buffy the Vampire Slayer. Winick stated, "At the end of the day, it's about a little girl who fights monsters. There's a rather massive backstory to the whole thing, which really provides a spine to build from. I've only tapped into it a little in the show, but for me, knowing it's there is important."

== Characters ==
=== Main ===
- Juniper "June" Kim Lee (voiced by Lara Jill Miller) is the protagonist of the series. Juniper is a feisty 11-year-old Chinese-American girl who lives in Orchid Bay City and is the current Te Xuan Ze. Juniper is relatively uneducated in the world of magic, mostly relying on her superhuman strength, the advice of her grandmother Ah-Mah, and her enchanted dog Monroe to defeat her foes. She has long black hair, in which a white streak appears once she inherits the powers of the Te Xuan Ze; she later dyes the streak reddish-pink. The juniper flower symbolizes protection, referring to Juniper's role as the Te Xuan Ze, protecting others.
- Jasmine Lee (voiced by Amy Hill) – Jasmine Lee or "Ah-Mah" (Chinese: 阿嬤; pinyin: Ā-mā; lit. 'grandma') as Juniper calls her, is Juniper's grandmother, and the previous Te Xuan Ze. Calm and deliberate in most respects but crude and tough when she needs to be, the 69-year-old assists June when she is in serious trouble. In the episode "Monster Con", Ah-Mah is shown to still possess a degree of magically enhanced speed and strength, though her stamina and durability are severely diminished to the point of being unable to stand unassisted after two to three minutes of combat.
- Ray Ray Lee (voiced by Kath Soucie) is Juniper's hyperactive, dim-witted 8-year-old little brother. Like Juniper, Ray Ray can see through the magic barrier, though this is not a naturally occurring ability. When Juniper first gained her powers, a group of demons attempted to drain her powers. Ray Ray unwittingly intervened, causing some of her powers to transfer to him. He is hyperactive and careless, and often gets himself into trouble when dealing with the magic world. He also has a sibling rivalry relationship with Juniper, although it is often seen that he cares for her deeply. In the episodes after "O Brother, What Art Thou?", Ray Ray is a homunculus, his mind having been transferred to an artificial body after he accidentally mutated his original body into a dinosaur-like creature.
- Monroe Connery Boyd Carlyle McGregor Scott V (Monroe for short, voiced by Carlos Alazraqui) is an enchanted pug of Scottish origin. He is quite educated in the world of magic, having been alive for several centuries and assisting each Te Xuan Ze. Monroe has been magically enhanced, allowing him to be understood by those who can see through the magic barrier.
- Dennis Lee (voiced by Alexander Polinsky) is Juniper's grumpy, cynical 15-year-old elder brother who does not take June or Ray Ray seriously and usually calls them names. He loves manga and video games, and does not like anyone touching his stuff. In "Sealed With a Fist", Dennis learns that his sister is the current Te Xuan Ze and has grown to trust June after they work together with Boomfist and H.A.T.E. (Heroes Against Terrible Evildoers) to defeat L.O.V.E. (League of Villainous Evildoers). After that, he starts helping Juniper and Ray Ray on occasion.
- Jody Irwin (voiced by Colleen O'Shaughnessey) is Juniper's best friend and usually the happiest of the group. She tries her best to cheer the group, even in the most ridiculous of ways.
- Ophelia Ramírez (voiced by Candi Milo) is one of Juniper's friends. She is a grumpy, cynical Latina goth emo girl with pinkish-purple colored hair. She doesn't like a lot of things (such as girly stuff) and especially hates Roger. When she is in charge, she wants everything done perfectly.
- Roger Radcliffe (voiced by Tara Strong) is one of Juniper's friends and the school's class clown, he has unpredictable tendencies and he constantly asks Ophelia to go on a date, which she refuses. He has been known to imitate famous people or songs in the most crude and ridiculous of ways. His family is eventually revealed to be wealthy, but he has never even come close to becoming spoiled, due to his cheerful personality.

=== Supporting ===
- Marcus Conner (voiced by Phil LaMarr) – Along with being handsome and popular, Marcus Conner is a cool African-American boy. Juniper has a big crush on him, although she will not admit it. Despite being part of the in-crowd, Marcus is friends with everyone and often looks out for Juniper. He never gets caught up in his popularity and is always laid-back.
- Michael and Barbara Lee (voiced by Carlos Alazraqui and Candi Milo) – Michael Lee and his wife, Barbara are the parents of Juniper, Ray Ray and Dennis. Michael is Jasmine's only child and was supposed to wind up being the Te Xuan Ze after her, but the trait skipped him and ended up with Juniper instead. Michael works with Mr. Radcliffe, though his occupation is unknown. His wife, Barbara, is a kind and caring mother but neither will tolerate academic problems. Unlike their daughter, neither Michael nor Barbara can see magic or enchanted beings. Michael and Barbara love their children, but will discipline them occasionally.
- Ms. Jill Gomez (voiced by Candi Milo) is a Mexican-American teacher at Juniper's school.
- William (voiced by Martin Jarvis) is Monroe's father, who previously served as the assistant to the Te Xuan Ze and constantly teases Monroe about his weight. He seems more proud of his Scottish ancestry than Monroe, as he is seen wearing a kilt and tam o'shanter.
- Melissa O'Malley (voiced by Tara Strong) is Juniper's Irish-American school diva rival who is jealous of June because she has a boyfriend (Marcus) and she doesn't which is why she plans on breaking June and Marcus apart so that she can steal Marcus from June. She is accompanied by two unnamed girls who help her with her plans against June and her friends.
- Cletus and Gus (voiced by Jeff Bennett and Dee Bradley Baker) are two recurring monsters, and friends of Juniper and Ray Ray.
- Lila (voiced by Tara Strong) is a Sasquatch. She is significantly more intelligent than other Sasquatch while also having the same strength levels as them. Ray Ray is seen to have a crush on her. Monroe uses an Exfoliax Charm to remove most of her excess hair so that she could pass for human. She then enrolls at Juniper's school to learn more about humans.

== Episodes ==
=== Series overview ===
Season	Episodes	Originally released	
Season	Episodes	First released	Last released
1	13	May 30, 2005	August 21, 2005
2	13	October 9, 2005	June 20, 2006
3	14	August 16, 2006	April 9, 2007
Shorts	6	December 28, 2006	May 14, 2007

=== Season 1 (2005) ===
No. overall	No. in season	Title	Written by	Storyboarded by	Original release date	Prod. code
1	1	"It's Your Party and I'll Whine if I Want To"	Judd Winick	Frank Squillace	May 30, 2005	101
June has been doing her Te Xuan Ze business for just over a month, and it's become a real hassle for her. She's managed to flake out on her friends on a regular basis and, has managed to acquire a reputation for being weird. And now, one of her best friends, Jody, is having a birthday party. June gets called away because the Leprechauns have let loose the Racatan. Despite begging Ah-Mah to help out, June is forced to skip the party and save Orchid Bay City again.
2	2	"I've Got My Mind on My Mummy and My Mummy on My Mind"	Judd Winick	Brian Larsen and Fred Reyes	June 5, 2005	104
June has to stop a mummy who opened up his own restaurant.
3	3	"It Takes a Pillage"	Tim McKeon	Vincent Edwards and Jason Park	June 12, 2005	102
The spirits of Nordic Vikings take possession of June's friends and it's up to her, Monroe, and RayRay to get them back to normal.
4	4	"New Trickster in Town"	Marsha Griffin	David Chlystek and Shannon Eric Denton	June 19, 2005	103
June battles Loki, the god of pranks and lies.
5	5	"Not in My Backyard"	Judd Winick	David Chlystek and Shannon Eric Denton	June 26, 2005	105
June and Ray Ray baby-sit a migrating Batoot.
6	6	"Enter Sandman"	Tim McKeon	Jim Schumann and Jill Trousdale	July 3, 2005	106
June tries out for the school talent show. But she must put her efforts on hold when everyone in the city falls asleep and they become victims of a plot by the Sandman, lord of the sleep realm. Note: This episode was dedicated to David Lehner, who died on June 11, 2005.
7	7	"Ding Dong, the Witch Ain't Dead"	Marsha Griffin	Vincent Edwards and Jason Park	July 10, 2005	107
Many years ago, there once was an evil witch named Auntie Roon who battled the Te Xuan Ze of that time. She was defeated and also banished at the same time. Many years later, a 10th level Warlock has gotten together with a Pus Goblin and an Antelope Snake to release Auntie Roon where the sacred grounds are where the Orchid Bay Mall now stands. At the same time, June, Jody, Ophelia, and Roger try to get in line to get the latest album from the band called Ambiguous Angst. When Auntie Roon is released, she lifts the veil that was preventing the humans from seeing monsters and has her minions gather every teen and kid in one spot.
8	8	"I'll Get By with a Little Help from My Elf"	Tim McKeon	Alex Que and Harry Sabin	July 17, 2005	108
June becomes so busy with her duties as Te Xuan Ze that she asks for some assistance in clearing her schedule from a helper elf who is Local 492. But he ends up causing more trouble than he's worth; most nearby, he gets June grounded by plagiarizing her platypus report.
9	9	"The World According to L.A.R.P."	Tom Franck	Fred Reyes and Brian Larsen	July 24, 2005	109
Maret, Grand Arch-Demon of the 6th Astral Plane, accidentally kidnaps Dennis.
10	10	"Magic Takes a Holiday"	Marsha Griffin	David Chlystek and Shannon Eric Denton	July 31, 2005	110
June goes to performing arts camp on Edipan.
11	11	"Take My Life, Please"	Marsha Griffin	Fred Reyes and Brian Larsen	August 7, 2005	111
The good 4th-degree sorceress named Ashley arrives in town while pursuing the Baguano. She volunteers to take over June's responsibilities as a bulwark against the forces of evil. June is tempted to let her. June tries to act normal and everything goes wrong.
12	12	"Meet the Parent"	Tim McKeon	Jason Park and Vincent Edwards	August 14, 2005	112
Monroe's father, William, comes to visit.
13	13	"Monster Con"	Judd Winick	Alex Que and Jill Colbert Trousdale	August 21, 2005	113
The three-day magic convention called "The Convergence" has opened in town and June attends it. All monsters go there to hear her speak. But when an evil organization named H.A.M. (Humans for the Abolishment of Magic) breaks into the convention center and holds everybody there hostage, Ah-Mah is forced out of retirement to save the day.

=== Season 2 (2005–06) ===
No. overall	No. in season	Title	Written by	Storyboarded by	Original release date	Prod. code
14	1	"It's the Great Pumpkin, Juniper Lee"	Adam Pava	David Chlystek and Patrick Kochakji	October 9, 2005	202
Every Halloween all monsters become humans for the night; but a monster called Evan has contracted an agent demon, Vikki Devyne, to make him human forever. Thanks to Vikki Devyne, all the now-human monster children are unable to change back into monsters, and the parents turn to June to help. However, she has to make deals from getting a protein shake to wrestling a demon that goes by the name of "Jordan The Destroyer" managed by a Don King-hairdo styled wrestling promoter before midnight, or else they will not turn back into monsters and remain human permanently.
15	2	"Oh Brother, What Art Thou?"	Tim McKeon	Brian Larsen and Fred Reyes	January 14, 2006	201
Ray Ray tests a growth potion that June has created for a dwarf giant, but his experimentation transforms him into a Tyrannosaurus-like creature who gradually grows in size. So June and Monroe try to create a new person and transfer Ray Ray's brain into it. It works, but the monster has suddenly gotten a mind of its own and wants to eliminate them all.
16	3	"The Great Escape"	Marsha F. Griffin	Alexander Que and Jill Colbert Trousdale	January 21, 2006	203
June and her friends are at the zoo, but when two camels speak to her, she suddenly learns from them that they are a group of magical beings trapped in the form of zoo animals because the zoo has a magical barrier. Now June must try to save them from a wicked zoo-keeper who is in reality a female demon named Gigi who drains magical energy from magical folk to stay young, and Gigi turns June into a ring-tailed lemur to drain her magical energy.
17	4	"Picture Day"	Tim McKeon	Brian Larsen and Fred Reyes	January 28, 2006	204
An evil demoness decides to make evil clones of June and her friends on picture day at school, so she sends her flunky to take the photographer's place. She then plans to use June's powers to free her father, Cordath the Conqueror, from magical banishment. When Evil Jody, Roger, and Ophelia are on the job, they try their best to capture the real June! So, when Jody just has enough of it, she zaps Juniper which makes her unconscious. Juniper wakes up and finds herself kidnapped. They've taken a picture where June was on the ground when Jody knocked her out, then they use her picture to make a clone of Juniper.
18	5	"Star Quality"	Adam Pava and Judd Winick	David Chlystek and Patrick Kochakji	February 3, 2006	205
After interfering in a television production called "The Wonderful World of Magic", the show's producer decides to make June the star of her own reality television show…without her knowledge or permission. Sure enough the show is a hit, and she's a superstar on Monster TV (which is located on any channel above 300 in Orchid Bay City's cable system). Even Ray Ray gets into the act, turning into June's manager, but Monroe isn't amused and neither is June, and she wants the show canceled. One problem: they're planning a special in over a billion monster households. Can June cancel the series and the special before it airs?
19	6	"There's No Mitzvah Like Snow Mitzvah"	Marsha F. Griffin	Alexander Que and Jill Colbert	March 11, 2006	206
During a Wizard of Oz-themed Bat Mitzvah for Jody's sister Rachael, June and the rest of the party are subjected inside a snow globe by Jean-Claude (and these hitmen he has), a former elder of magic who he was kicked out for being a traitor. Can June save the day and the party at the same time?
20	7	"Bada Bing Bada Boomfist"	Tim McKeon	Brian Larsen and Fred Reyes	March 17, 2006	207
One of Ray Ray's comic book characters, Wrongness, is accidentally brought to life while June is fighting a demon who accidentally hits it with a magic spell. So while June and Monroe create a potion to make Wrongness (who now has a women's body for his disembodied head) back to the comic book, Ray Ray goes to the demon who animated him to bring Boomfist (the protagonist of the comic) into reality. Can the three get the superhero and his formidable foe back into the comic book before Orchid Bay City gets completely wiped off the map?
21	8	"Adventures in Babysitting"	Judd Winick	Jill Colbert and Alexander Que	March 24, 2006	208
After capturing a goblin who has wreaked havoc in the Orchid Bay City park, Ah-Mah tells Ray Ray and June the story of how Juniper became the Te Xuan Ze and why she can see magical creatures. Several years ago, when Ah-Mah was still the Te Xuan Ze, she was becoming aware of her age and the drops in performance that brings. Unfortunately, her son shows no signs of becoming magical in any way, as do her grandchildren. When Ah-Mah babysits her grandchildren, her bracelet glows signifying a disturbance in the magic world. Juniper seems to feel this as a stomach ache. Meanwhile, some demon trolls led by Nester (who had fought Ah-Mah earlier) decide to find and take care of the new Te Xuan Ze before he or she can gain their powers. They come to Ah-Mah's house to find the new Te Xuan Ze, inadvertently triggering Juniper's dormant powers, causing one stripe of hair to turn white (She will dye it magenta later). The trolls use an amulet in an attempt to drain Juniper's magical energy, but Ray Ray intervenes, accidentally transferring Juniper's magical sight to himself. Juniper starts to get the hang of her new powers and holds off all three trolls until Ah-Mah returns and finishes the job. Ray Ray isn't too surprised that he doesn't remember, since in the grand scheme of things that would be considered a normal day for him. He's still confused why he doesn't have any other powers. Ah-Mah says that he should wonder why he doesn't have any—yet.
22	9	"June's Egg-cellent Adventure: Juniper Lee Meets the Easter Bunny"	Judd Winick	Mike Kunkel and Jill Colbert	April 14, 2006	209
On the eve of the 7th annual Orchid Bay Park Easter Egg Hunt, Ray Ray is practicing to win the grand prize of twenty pounds of candy by less than honorable means. Meanwhile, Juniper asks Marcus to go with her to the event (she claims it's not a date). Monroe tells Ray Ray that the Easter Bunny won't leave him any gifts if he cheats to win. Ray Ray thinks he's lying. Juniper confirms that the Easter Bunny not only exists, but there are thousands of them. Monroe then tells the story about Sweetland, where the Easter Chickens make the eggs and the Easter Bunnies paint and deliver them. They are then sent by a pair of Easter Bunnies to Sweetland to intervene in a feud between the Easter Bunnies and the Easter Chickens, the latter of which are being led by Monroe's father William. Little do they realize that a blue-skinned enchanted rhinoceros named Mitch has set them up in order for him to take over the holiday and replace the candy and eggs with AA batteries and socks. Will everyone realize it before it's too late?
23	10	"I've Got You Under My Skin"	Marsha F. Griffin	Jill Colbert and Alexander Que	May 12, 2006	210
When Ah-Mah gets lost because she missed a flight on a dragon to mediate a dispute (which would later turn out to be a trap), Monroe uses a magic stone to make two Junipers but Ray Ray gets in the way of the blast and turns into Juniper's double so they turn Monroe into Ray Ray so their mom won't be suspicious. She has to take her grandmother's place in the negotiations, sending them to school.
24	11	"Welcome Bat Otter"	Tim McKeon	Brian Larsen and Fred Reyes	June 6, 2006	211
Monsters are scared of a menace called the Bat Otter, so it's up to June to save the day…with some help from Skeeter Khomen-Gettit's anti-Bat Otter kit, that is. When June finds out its just a scam to make money, will she be able to expose the truth?
25	12	"Dog Show Afternoon"	Judd Winick	David Chlystek and Brian Larsen	June 15, 2006	212
When June's family plans to go on vacation, she signs up for a trip to Space Camp, but she must catch a mysterious creature called a Bombat before she can leave Orchid Bay. To do so, June must enter Monroe in a dog show. Unfortunately, she also learns a terrible price to being the Te Xuan Ze—June can't leave the city physically.
26	13	"Dream Date"	Marsha F. Griffin	David Chlystek and Patrick Kochakji	June 20, 2006	213
June and Marcus go to the school dance, but Steven the Sandman has other plans for them as he plans to return to the Dream Realm.

=== Season 3 (2006–07) ===
No. overall	No. in season	Title	Written by	Storyboarded by	Original release date	Prod. code
27	1	"Party Monsters"	Tim McKeon	David Chlystek and Patrick Kochakji	August 16, 2006	301
At Jasmine's birthday party, her relatives turn into monsters, thanks to a well-meaning but incompetent old friend and a magical orb. How can Jasmine and Juniper stop this before the entire house turns into creatures?
28	2	"Who's Your Daddy?"	Marsha Griffin	David Chlystek and Jill Colbert	August 23, 2006	302
Marcus encounters severe jealousy when a new boy named Taylor Evermore enters June's life. Unfortunately, Taylor is the son of Loki.
29	3	"Water We Fighting For?"	Tim McKeon	Fred Reyes and Alex Que	August 30, 2006	303
The magical water from Orchid Bay is disappearing at an alarming rate when a water company is draining it. Juniper heads to Aqualandia to seek out its king to fix the problem before Orchid Bay is capsized.
30	4	"Feets Too Big"	Judd Winick	Patrick Kochakji and Jennifer Coyle	September 8, 2006	304
June and Roger's families are enjoying a camping trip until both their parents and Dennis are kidnapped by the legendary Sasquatch. Juniper, Ray Ray, and Monroe are on the search and they meet a new friend along the way: a female Sasquatch named Lila.
31	5	"Citizen June"	Marsha F. Griffin	Jill Colbert and Dave Chlystek	September 15, 2006	305
June runs for class president against Melissa O'Malley. Thor returns when he pursues a Vindolf Hobgoblin to her school which it's hiding in. If the Vindolf Hobgoblin isn't found soon, Thor will destroy the school to take out the monster.
32	6	"Make Me Up Before You Go-Go"	Michael Jelenic	Fred Reyes and Alex Que	September 22, 2006	306
June is helping Lila the Sasquatch learn to fit in by taking her to a slumber party at Jody's house. However, a pint-sized monster called a Monotuke is using an incoming comet to summon a pair of powerful monsters called Uglian Banticores.
33	7	"Out of the Past"	Marsha F. Griffin	Patrick Kochakji and Brian Larsen	September 29, 2006	307
Kai Yee, a former Te Xuan Ze who became a traitor, is freed from being a statue thanks to the DaPheetes company and once again attempts to destroy the orb that gives life to the Magical Elders whom empower both Juniper and Ah-Mah making him stronger, which means it's up to both of them to have him intercepted.
34	8	"Sealed with a Fist!"	Eric Kentoff	Dave Chlystek and Jill Colbert	November 3, 2006	308
When Dennis finds June's Invasion of the Inanimations comic book, he accidentally brings the Legion of Villainous Evildoers (L.O.V.E.) to life, wreaking havoc on Orchid Bay. As Dennis tries to make it up to June, Ray Ray brings back Boomfist and his compadres to life, and to stop L.O.V.E.
35	9	"Little Big Mah"	Kevin Seccia	Fred Reyes and Alex Que	November 10, 2006	309
Ah-Mah is made younger by a Darnock Demon, and now June has to help her turn back and stop the Darnock Demon from absorbing the power of the Elders. At the end of this episode, Juniper Lee meets a Magical Elder.
36	10	"Te Xuan Me?"	Judd Winick	Patrick Kochakji and Rafael Rosado	November 24, 2006	310
When June forecomes to a mysterious spell, causing her and all of her classmates to disappear not only from space but from time, Ray Ray, who is the Te Xuan Ze in this new reality, and the only one who remembers June existed, must substitute for her while trying to convince everyone that June and her classmates existed and that he's not crazy.
37	11	"Food for Naught"	Eric Kentoff	Dave Chlystek and Jill Colbert	December 1, 2006	311
June investigates as the monsters in Orchid Bay City become fierce beasts. When she discovers that the source of this is in the Runey Stix snack food, she tries to persuade the snacks' creators, a pair of demons named Margie and Eloise, to stop adding Tarabok Weed (the secret ingredient and also what's causing the transformations) in them.
38	12	"A Helping H.A.M."	Tim McKeon	Alex Que and Fred Reyes	December 15, 2006	312
Fed up with his lack of respect, Monroe joins the secret organization known as H.A.M. when he is accidentally captured instead of June.
39	13	"The Kids Stay in the Picture"	Kevin Seccia	Patrick Kochakji and Rafael Rosado	February 6, 2007; Unaired	313
Ophelia wants June and her friends to be in her student film as Cordoth's daughter plots to escape Barandom.
40	14	"Every Witch Way but Loose"	Marsha F. Griffin	Dave Chlystek and Jill Colbert	April 9, 2007; Unaired	314
The origin of the magic veil and the Te Xuan Ze is revealed. Auntie Roon returns for a second time and plans to enslave humanity by turning June into a monster and breaking the Magical Touchstones. Jody becomes suspicious of June as Ray Ray, Monroe, Dennis, and Lila try to prevent Auntie Roon from succeeding.

=== Shorts (2006–07) ===
No. in series	Title	Original release date
1	"Monsters in My Potion"	December 28, 2006
June finds Ray Ray and Monroe tied upside-down with three monsters brewing something in the cauldron. She fights the monsters and dumps the cauldron. Later, another monster comes out from the bushes with a bag of groceries. June realizes that the monsters weren't going to cook Ray Ray and Monroe. So they sit down at the picnic table, and enjoy the soup. Ray Ray is still tied upside-down. Then Monroe puts an onion in Ray Ray's mouth to shut him up.
2	"The Bus Stop"	January 2, 2007
June is waiting at the bus stop with Jody and Ophelia. The two-headed nerd creature shows up and starts bothering June to take a picture with her. Jody and Ophelia look at June as if there's something wrong. When the two-headed nerd stops disturbing June, she goes on the bus, and finds more monsters who want to take a photo of her.
3	"Just a Second"	January 5, 2007
While June is waiting for Ray Ray to come downstairs, Ray Ray tries to fight off a monster in his room. He keeps throwing magical jars at the creature as it grows bigger. June calls Ray Ray to come downstairs, but Ray Ray keeps saying "Just a second" while fighting off the beast.
4	"Nice Weather"	January 6, 2007
While June is brushing her hair to look nice on a date with Marcus, Ray Ray comes in her room and tells her he accidentally released the giant mucus troll in the living room. June tells Ray Ray to distract Marcus at the door while she fights off the creature.
5	"Beach Blanket Monroe"	January 6, 2007
As June is relaxing at the beach, two creature kids with five-eyes throw Monroe around like a football. She rescues Monroe, but keeps the monster kids happy by giving them Ray Ray to throw around, much to his pleasure.
6	"Big Monster in My Backyard"	May 14, 2007
When June misplaces her magical Te Xuan Ze bracelet, Ray Ray and Monroe unleash a monster in the backyard in order for the bracelet to go off so June can find it.

== Awards and nominations ==
Year	Award	Category	Nominee(s)	Result	Ref
2006	Primetime Emmy Awards	Outstanding Individual Achievement in Animation	Frederick Gardner for "Adventures in Babysitting"	Won	
2006	Annie Awards	Best Production Design in an Animated Television Production	Alan Bodner for "Enter Sandman"	Nominated	
2007	Annie Awards	Best Character Design in an Animated Television Production	Mike Kunkel for "Party Monsters"	Won	
2007	Annie Awards	Best Production Design in an Animated Television Production	Alan Bodner for "Water We Fighting For?"	Nominated	
2007	Writers Guild of America Awards	Best Writing in an Animated Program for Television	Marsha Griffin for "Who's Your Daddy?"	Nominated	

== Comics ==
Stories based on the series were featured in issues of Cartoon Network Action Pack.
