= Howard Porter (artist) =

American comic book artist

- Notable works: JLA; The Flash

Howard Porter is an American comic book artist from southern Connecticut.

== Education ==
Howard Porter graduated from Paier College of Art in Connecticut where he majored in illustration. One of his teachers there was Frank McLaughlin. McLaughlin also worked as a comic book inker and he began to give Porter work assisting him in his inking jobs which led Porter to assist other inkers and eventually find work for himself in the industry.

== Biography ==
Porter worked as a penciller and his first major run on a title came with DC Comics' The Ray (vol. 2) (1994–1995), where he worked with writer Christopher Priest. Shortly afterward, Porter worked on DC's summer 1995 crossover event Underworld Unleashed, with writer Mark Waid, followed by the Justice League of America relaunch, JLA (1997–2000), with writer Grant Morrison and inker John Dell.

Porter temporarily left comics to work in banking, doing graphic design work for Credit Suisse First Boston. He left that job in 2003 to open an artists' studio with comics artist Ron Garney. Porter returned to comics that year with a six-issue run of Marvel Comics' Fantastic Four, reuniting with writer Waid.

In July 2004, Porter signed a two-year exclusive contract with DC, and began as regular penciller of The Flash, with writer Geoff Johns and inker John Livesay.

In 2006, DC announced Porter would pencil the limited series The Trials of Shazam!, collaborating with writer Judd Winick. Porter was unable to finish the series because he severely injured his hand after cutting it on glass (severing a nerve and almost the entire tendon in his thumb) and had to take time off to recover. Unable to draw, Porter worked as a school bus driver until his return in late 2008, when he drew DC Universe: Decisions #2. He became the regular penciller on Titans and then was the first artist for the Doc Savage series. He also drew an issue of The Brave and the Bold featuring a team-up between Static and Black Lightning. He then became the regular penciler on DC Comics' Magog for the series' first ten issues, before being replaced by Scott Kolins.

As of 2016, Howard Porter is still drawing for DC Comics, with his works including Superman Beyond, Justice League 3000, Superman and Scooby-Doo.

In September 2014, Porter was the artist put forward by DC to create the poster and key art for the UFC 181 MMA fight event. Porter - a fan of the UFC - created art featuring the main four fighters on the UFC 181 card as superheroes.

== Bibliography ==
The cover to The Flash #225, cover art by Howard Porter.

=== DC Comics ===
- Aquaman/Justice League: Drowned Earth #1 (with Scott Snyder, DC Comics, 2018)
- Countdown to Final Crisis #20, 18 (DC Comics, 2007)
- Dark Knights Rising: The Wild Hunt #1 (with Scott Snyder, DC Comics, 2018)
- DC Secret Files – JLA: Secret Files & Origins #1 (with Grant Morrison and Mark Millar, DC Comics, August 1997)
- DC Universe: Decisions #2, 4 (with Judd Winick and Bill Willingham, DC Comics, 2008)
- DC Universe Online: Legends #1–2, 4, 6-7, 10, 12-14, 18-20, 22–24, 26 (with Marv Wolfman, DC Comics, 2011–2012)
- Doc Savage #1–5 (with Paul Malmont, DC Comics, 2010)
- JLA #1–7, 10–16, 18, 19, 22–25, 28–31, 34, 36–41, 43–45 (with Grant Morrison and Mark Waid, DC Comics, 1996–2000)
- Justice League/Aquaman: Drowned Earth #1 (with James Tynion, DC Comics, 2018)
- Justice League vs. Suicide Squad #6 (with Joshua Williamson, DC Comics, 2017)
- Justice League 3000 #1-4, 6-13, 15 (with Keith Giffen and J. M. DeMatteis, DC Comics, 2014-2015)
- Justice League 3001 #1-3, 5 (with Keith Giffen and J. M. DeMatteis, DC Comics, 2015)
- Magog #1–7 (pencils, with Keith Giffen, DC Comics, 2009-2010)
- The Ray #0–11, 13, 14 (with Christopher Priest, DC Comics, 1994–1995)
- Scooby Apocalypse #1-7 (with Keith Giffen and J. M. DeMatteis, DC Comics, 2016)
- Superman Vol. 3 #45-48, 50 (with Gene Luen Yang, DC Comics, 2015-2016)
- Superman Beyond #1–20 (with JT Krul, DC Comics, 2012)
- Titans #7–11 (pencils, with Judd Winick, DC Comics, 2009)
- The Flash Vol. 2 #207–211, 213–217, 220–225 (with Geoff Johns, DC Comics, December 2003 – August 2005)
- The Flash #21-22, 26-27, 33, 36, 47-50, 70-75, Annual 1 (with Joshua Williamson, DC Comics, 2017-2019)
- The Trials of Shazam! #1–9 (with Judd Winick, 12-issue limited series, DC Comics, 2006–2007)
- Underworld Unleashed #1–3 (with Mark Waid, DC Comics, 1995)

=== Marvel Comics ===
- Fantastic Four #503–508 (with Mark Waid, Marvel Comics, 2003–2004)
