= Justice League 3000 =

Comic book series

- Cover of Justice League 3000 #1 (February 2014), art by Howard Porter.

Group publication information
- Publisher: DC Comics
- First appearance: Justice League 3000 #1 (December 2013)
- Created by: J. M. DeMatteis, Keith Giffen, Howard Porter

Justice League 3000

Series publication information
- Schedule: Monthly
- Format: Ongoing
- Publication date: December 2013 – March 2015
- Creator(s): J. M. DeMatteis, Keith Giffen, Howard Porter

Justice League 3000 is a comic book series published by DC Comics. Taking place in the future of the DC Universe as part of The New 52, the series features a 31st-century iteration of the Justice League, with new versions of Superman, Batman, Wonder Woman, the Flash, and Green Lantern. The series is written by J. M. DeMatteis and Keith Giffen and illustrated by Howard Porter. Justice League 3000 began publication in December 2013.

== Synopsis ==
In the 31st century, humanity has spread its influence across the stars and in an age where heroes are in dire need, the Justice League is reformed for peacekeeping across space. Project Cadmus, a genetic engineering corporation, had held the genetic material of the greatest past original Justice League heroes for over a millennium and the Wonder Twins (Teri and Terry) use those samples to recreate Superman, Green Lantern, Batman, Wonder Woman, and the Flash. Using advanced bio-engineering, the duo enable the creation and survival of duplicates of the five superheroes, but with only fragments of their memories and powers. In desperation to contain a growing intergalactic threat, Cadmus presses on with their Justice League 3000 experiment with the objective of restoring interstellar order.

The friendships that existed and possibly drove the previous JL are either different, strained or nonexistent. For example, Batman and Superman seem to despise each other. The Flash does not have the anti-friction aura that protected the original while running and requires an artificial one to prevent incineration. Green Lantern does not have a ring, instead being a living incarnation of the emerald energy, and wears a cloak that keeps his green aura in check and prevents it from killing him. Superman has neither heat vision nor flight capabilities, and the team continuously reminds him of these as he forgets often.

== Publication history ==
The series was first mentioned at a DC Comics Retailer Roadshow, and later announced by Comic Book Resources that the title would reunite Justice League International writers Keith Giffen, J. M. Dematteis and Kevin Maguire, along with character designs by artist Howard Porter. In August 2013, Maguire was let go from the title; Porter would take over art duties, with the title's premiere being pushed back to December. The series was originally solicited for October.

The writers had offered little on the background of the team or characters, stating that they were new characters, and not descendants of existing characters. Despite Justice League 3000 launching the month following the cancellation of Legion of Super-Heroes and taking place in the same time period, Giffen confirmed that the two series are not connected, stating that "it would be unfair to put out a book that insists you're familiar with another book".

The book ended in March 2015 with issue #15, and was relaunched in June as Justice League 3001.

== Early reception ==
In early September 2013, Complex listed Justice League 3000 as number 21 on its list of "The 25 Most Anticipated Comic Books of Fall 2013", stating that it is "hard to argue with that creative team and the sleek new designs".

== Collected editions ==
Title	Material collected	Publication date	ISBN
Justice League 3000 Vol. 1: Yesterday Lives	Justice League 3000 #1–7	October 2014	978-1401250461
Justice League 3000 Vol. 2: The Camelot War	Justice League 3000 #8–13	April 2015	978-1401254148
Justice League 3001 Vol. 1: Deja Vu All Over Again	Justice League 3000 #14–15, DC Sneak Peek: Justice League 3001 #1, Justice League 3001 #1–6	March 2016	978-1401261481
Justice League 3001 Vol. 2: Things Fall Apart	Justice League 3001 #7-12	September 2016	978-1401264727
