= The Adventures of Barry Ween, Boy Genius =

Comic book series

- Cover of the second issue

Character information
- First appearance: The Adventures of Barry Ween: Boy Genius vol. 1 (March 1999)
- Created by: Judd Winick

Publication information
- Publisher: Image Comics; Oni Press
- Schedule: vol. 1 and 2.0; Monthly; Monkey Tales; Bimonthly
- Formats: Original material for the series has been published as a set of limited series and one-shot comics.
- Genre: Superhero
- Publication date: 1999–2002
- Number of issues: vol. 1; 3; 2.0; 3 Monkey Tales; 6
- Main character(s): Barry Ween; Jeremy Ramirez; Sara Tan, Roxie

Creative team
- Writer(s): Judd Winick
- Artist(s): Judd Winick

Reprints
- Collected editions
- Volume 1: ISBN 1-929998-00-7

The Adventures of Barry Ween, Boy Genius is a comic book metaseries created, written and illustrated by Judd Winick. It follows the comical escapades of the eponymous character, a 10-year-old boy who secretly possesses the most powerful intellect on Earth, along with his impulsive best friend Jeremy and his crush Sara. Barry puts his genius to work primarily in creating outlandish inventions that are centuries ahead of their time, such as teleportation devices, jetpacks and wallet-sized nuclear devices. Many of the storylines involve one of Barry's inventions going horribly wrong (usually due to Jeremy's clumsiness) and the two boys' efforts to right the situation before anyone can find out. Barry takes great care to keep his genius a secret and maintains Jeremy as his only confidant. The pair's dialogue is rife with profanity, often complex in its construction, and this foul-mouthed irreverence is reflected to a lesser extent in several of the other characters.

== Publication history ==
Barry Ween's adventures were first published in a three-issue mini-series by Image Comics in 1999. Oni Press picked up the title for two additional miniseries: three issues in 2000, and six issues in 2001 and 2002. The most recent issue was released in February 2002. For a time Winick's website listed Barry Ween: Boy Genius in Space as an upcoming work, which after being on hiatus for 8 years has recently been announced to be in progress.

== Characters ==
=== Barry Ween ===
Barry is ten years old and by far the smartest organism on the planet. No explanation is ever provided for his vast intellect, although the first issue begins with Barry stating that "I was smart even before birth, and I'm not talking a little smart. I mean way smart, like, self-awareness-in-the-womb-smart." He is an extremely prolific inventor and has built an immense secret lair underneath his suburban home full of robots, futuristic transports, and weapons. Due to his knowledge of the workings of the human body, he is exceptionally skilled at hand-to-hand combat. Despite his genius, however, Barry is prone to making errors in his experiments that can lead to near-catastrophic consequences, like turning his aunt into an enormous deformed blob, knocking the Earth out of the Sun's orbit, or accidentally creating an inter-dimensional rift in his basement. He copes with his unusual lifestyle by adopting a sardonic sense of humor and a thinly veiled contempt for most of his schoolmates. Despite the great power that his intelligence grants him, he admits later in the series that his superior mind is a kind of curse: he cannot stop thinking, calculating probabilities, and formulating plans; so he never sleeps. In fact, he attends school because he believes social interaction will slow his descent into madness.

=== Jeremy Ramirez ===
Jeremy is the only human to know of Barry's abilities (other characters have discovered them at various points in the series, only to have Barry erase their memories). Like Barry, Jeremy is a profane and irreverent ten-year-old, although Jeremy shows a great deal less maturity and restraint. He has an enormous and somewhat curious interest in women, despite not having yet entered puberty. He tags along for all of Barry's adventures, usually to provide comic relief. He fervently denies any attraction to Roxie (despite evidence to the contrary). When asked by Roxie why he keeps Jeremy around, Barry replies that he enjoys having someone not in awe of his genius or asking questions to keep him a bit grounded.

=== Sara Tan ===
A classmate and friend to Barry and Jeremy, Sara (sometimes spelled "Sarah," most likely a typo) is probably the smartest character in the series next to Barry. She is confident, brave, and resourceful; qualities that have made her an able participant in some of Barry's more dangerous escapades. Barry is very attracted to her, and dealing with their relationship has been perhaps one of the few challenges he cannot surmount with his intelligence alone. It is not clear to what degree Sara reciprocates this affection, although she clearly likes and respects Barry. She has twice learned of his intelligence, but Barry erased her memory the first time and altered the past through time travel the second time in order to save her from death. Though Sara's death was averted, Barry was intensely - though privately - devastated by the experience.

Whether or not Barry will eventually admit her into his confidence remains to be seen.

=== Roxie ===
Roxie is a Bigfoot whom Barry and Jeremy met when Barry's parents were kidnapped and nearly eaten by another Sasquatch. Far more intelligent and ambitious than the lazy majority of her kind, she was able to secure Barry's help in removing most of her hair so that she could pass for human. Despite looking like an eleven-year-old girl, Roxie is extremely strong, fast and agile, and often forgets that she must pretend to be weaker to maintain her cover. She is a voracious reader, and prior to meeting Barry used to break into libraries in order to gain access to books. She has so far only appeared in two issues.

== Bibliography ==
- The Adventures of Barry Ween: Boy Genius vol. 1, three issues, March–May 1999, Image Comics
- The Adventures of Barry Ween: Boy Genius 2.0, three issues, February–April 2000,Oni Press
- Oni Press Summer Vacation Supercolor Fun Special, one-shot, July 2000, Oni Press
  - Featured Story: Weenout: The Carrie-Ween Crossover, featuring Carrie Stetko from Whiteout; co-written by Greg Rucka & Winick, and illustrated by Winick
- The Adventures of Barry Ween: Boy Genius - Monkey Tales (six issues, February–October 2001 & February 2002, Oni Press)
- The Adventures of Barry Ween: Boy Genius - Secret Crisis Origin Files(reprint of Monkey Tales #4 for Free Comic Book Day, published July 2004 by Oni Press)

=== Collected editions ===
The series has been collected into a number of trade paperbacks:

- The Adventures of Barry Ween: Boy Genius, Volume 1 (collects vol. 1 #1-3, August 2000, Oni Press, ISBN 1-929998-00-7)
- The Adventures of Barry Ween: Boy Genius, Volume 2 - 2.0 (collects vol. 2 #1-3, 2001, Oni Press, ISBN 978-0-9299-9805-3)
- The Adventures of Barry Ween: Boy Genius, Volume 3 - Monkey Tales (collects Monkey Tales #1-3, 2001, Oni Press, ISBN 1-929998-18-X)
- The Adventures of Barry Ween: Boy Genius, Volume 4 - Gorilla Warfare (collects Monkey Tales #4-6, 2002, Oni Press, ISBN 978-1-9299-9819-7)
- The Big Book of Barry Ween: Boy Genius (collects all 12 issues of all 3 limited series, 2008, Oni Press, ISBN 978-1-9349-6402-6)

=== Other appearances ===
- Oni Press Color Special 2001 (one-shot, June 2001, Oni Press)
  - Barry makes an appearance in the opening story, Who Killed Madman?, as rendered by Mike Allred
