= Frumpy the Clown =

American comic strip by Judd Winick

- Author(s): Judd Winick
- Current status/schedule: Concluded
- Launch date: 1996-07-01
- End date: 1998-06-07
- Syndicate(s): Creators Syndicate
- Genre(s): Humor

Frumpy the Clown is a comic-strip written and illustrated by Judd Winick and appeared from 1996 to 1998.

Although it only ran for two years and appeared only in 30 newspapers (the largest being the Chicago Sun-Times), it had a fair sized fan base.

The strip began when Brad Bragg, a 10-year-old kid, brought back a clown to live with his family. The parents were reluctant, but since the kids loved him, they decided to let him stay.

Frumpy is a far cry from a normal clown. Though he has the white face, green hair, red nose, huge feet and polka-dotted jumpsuit one might expect, he's fairly grouchy, a chain-smoker, and twice divorced. He doesn't enjoy being stereotyped as an entertainer, and doesn't do magic tricks, balloon animals, or comedy bits. He does love children, however, and teaches elementary school in order to help kids grow up right in the modern world. In the summer, he works as a camp counselor.

Characters other than Frumpy include Mike and Mona Bragg, parents, and their kids Kim and Brad. The Bragg family was Jewish, setting them apart from the average generic comic strip family. This fact was not treated as a big deal, and was only an important plot point in one storyline. (See below)

Other characters include Nana (Mike's mother), Principal Carr (principal of Vanderbilt Elementary School, where Frumpy teaches), Lumus (Mike Braggs' cousin) and the Bragg family's cat Frodo (although the cat was introduced in January 1997, her name wasn't revealed until May 1998).

Although this strip is mostly comedy, it did have some serious moments. For example, in one storyline Nana was revealed a Holocaust survivor.

Unfortunately, the strip ran into controversy. Many parents complained that this strip was inappropriate and unsuitable. At the same time, the cartoonist became burnt out and grew tired of doing the strip.

The strip ended with a week-long storyline where the clown announced the family he's moving out. The clown rode down the street on an elephant while the family gave him a teary good-bye.
