= Judd Winick =

American writer

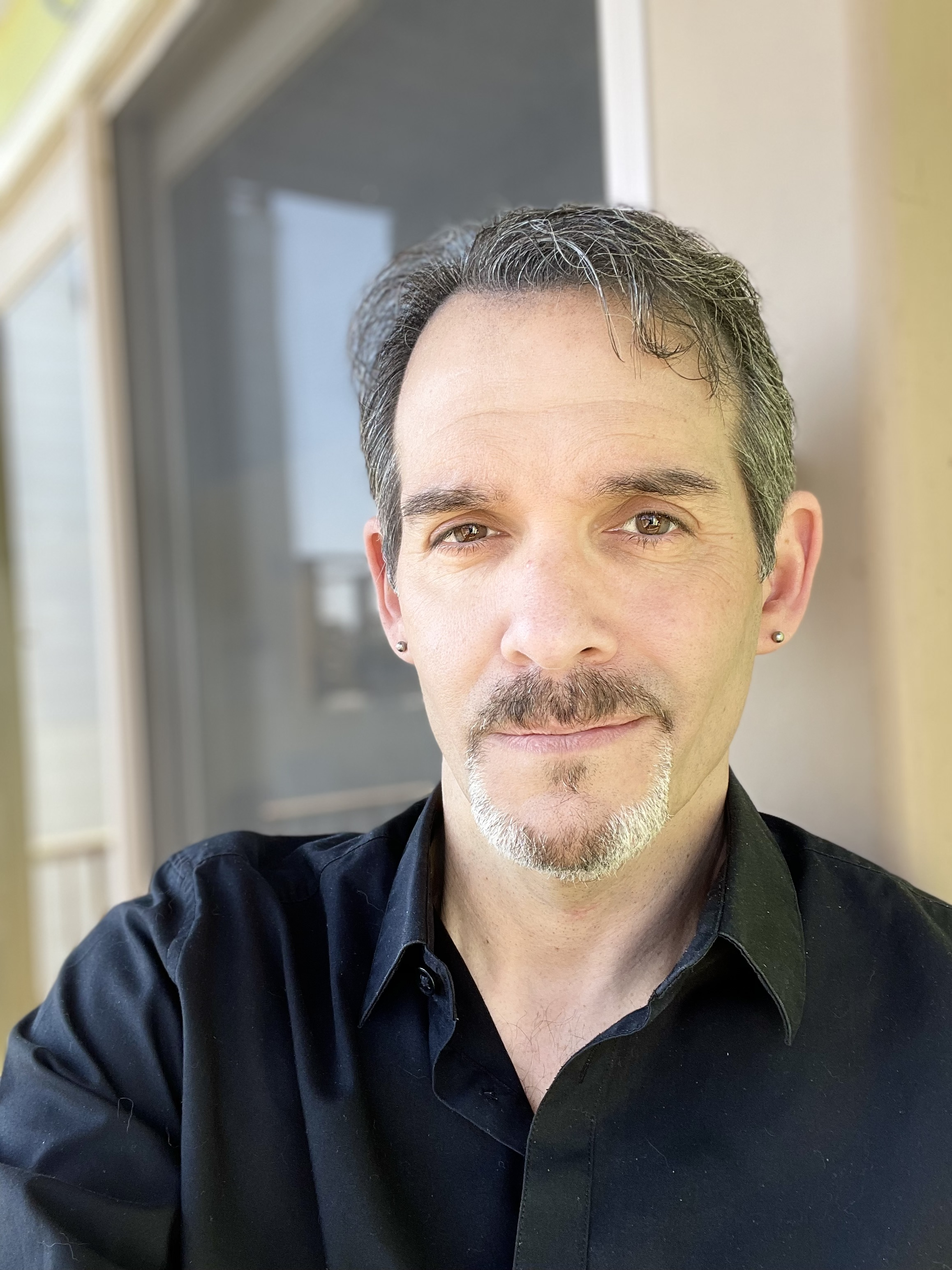
- Winick in San Francisco, March 2023
- Born: February 12, 1970 (age 56) Long Island, New York, U.S.
- Areas: Cartoonist, Writer, Penciller, Inker, Letterer
- Notable works: Pedro and Me; Green Lantern; Green Arrow; Batman: Under the Hood; Hilo; The Life and Times of Juniper Lee
- Spouse: Pam Ling (m. 2001)
- Children: 2

Judd Winick (born February 12, 1970) is an American cartoonist, comic book writer and screenwriter, as well as a former reality television personality. He first gained fame for his stint on MTV's The Real World: San Francisco in 1994, before finding success as a comic book creator with Pedro and Me, an autobiographical graphic novel about his friendship with The Real World castmate and AIDS educator Pedro Zamora. Winick wrote lengthy runs on DC Comics' Green Lantern and Green Arrow series, created The Life and Times of Juniper Lee animated TV series for Cartoon Network, which ran for three seasons, and since 2015 has been the writer and cartoonist on his New York Times best selling graphic novel series Hilo.

As part of his run on Batman, Winick wrote the 2005 storyline "Under the Hood", which featured the return of Jason Todd, the second Robin (who was murdered by the Joker in the 1988 storyline "A Death in the Family"), now operating as the anti-hero Red Hood. Winick also wrote the prequel miniseries Red Hood: The Lost Days, which detailed the exact nature of Todd's resurrection, as well as the animated film Batman: Under the Red Hood, which adapted his original story to screen.

== Early life and career ==
Winick was born February 12, 1970, to a Jewish family, and grew up in Dix Hills, New York. In his youth Winick initially read superhero comics, but this changed when he read Kyle Baker's graphic novel Why I Hate Saturn, which Winick said in a 2015 interview he still reads once a year. Winick also cites Bloom County: Loose Tails by Berke Breathed as the first collection of that strip that changed his life, one which prompted him to spend the next ten years "horribly aping" Breathed's style.

Winick graduated from high school in 1988 and entered the University of Michigan, Ann Arbor's School of Art, intending to emulate his cartoonist heroes, including Breathed and Garry Trudeau. His comic strip, "Nuts and Bolts", began running in the school's newspaper, the Michigan Daily, in his freshman year, and he was selected to speak at graduation. The university published a small print-run of a collection of his strips called Watching the Spin-Cycle: The Nuts & Bolts Collection. In his senior year, Universal Press Syndicate, which syndicates strips such as Doonesbury and Calvin & Hobbes, offered Winick a development contract.

== Career ==
=== Early work ===
After graduation, Winick lived in an apartment in Beacon Hill, Boston, Massachusetts, with fellow writer Brad Meltzer, struggling to develop Nuts and Bolts for UPS, while working at a bookstore. On January 1, 1993, UPS decided not to renew Winick's strip for syndication, feeling it could not compete in the current market. Winick was unable to secure syndication with another company and was forced to move back in with his parents by the middle of 1993, doing unfulfilling T-shirt work for beer companies. Winick had Nuts & Bolts in development with the children's television network Nickelodeon as an animated series, even turning the human characters into mice, and proposing new titles like Young Urban Mice and Rat Race, but nothing came of it.

=== The Real World: San Francisco ===
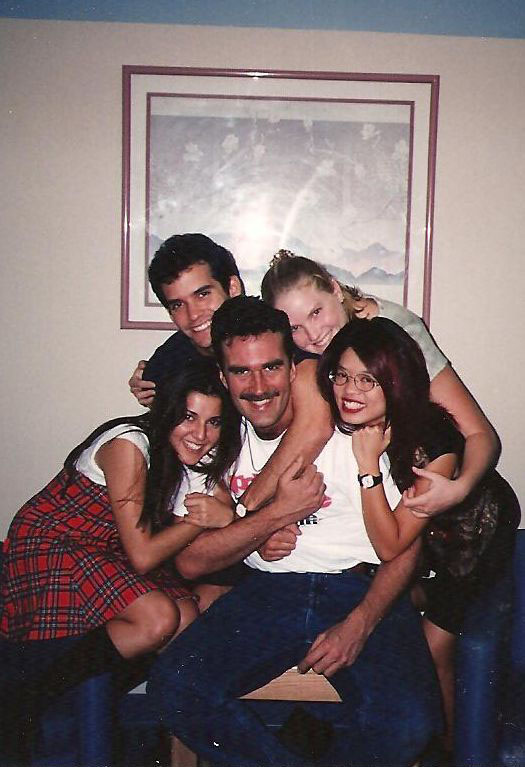
Winick (upper left) in 1994 with (left to right): Rachel Campos, Alex Escarno, Cory Murphy and Winick's then-girlfriend (now wife) Pam Ling

Winick applied to be on MTV network's reality TV series The Real World: San Francisco, hoping for fame and a career boost. During the casting process, the producers of the show conducted an in-person, videotaped interview with Winick. When asked how he would feel about living with someone who was HIV-positive, Winick gave what he thought was an enthusiastic, politically correct answer, despite reservations. Winick was accepted as a cast member on the show in January 1994. The producers informed the housemates that they would be living with someone who was HIV-positive, but they did not reveal who it was. Winick and his six castmates (Mohammed Bilal, Rachel Campos, Pam Ling, Cory Murphy, David "Puck" Rainey, and Pedro Zamora) moved into the house at 949 Lombard Street on Russian Hill on February 12, Winick's 24th birthday. Winick became roommates with Pedro Zamora. Although Cory Murphy, who was the first housemate to meet Zamora, learned that he was HIV-positive when they took the train together from Los Angeles to San Francisco, Winick learned that Zamora was the housemate who had AIDS after Winick and Zamora had decided to be roommates, when Zamora told him that he was an AIDS educator, and subsequently showed his scrapbook to Winick and the other housemates.

Winick's Nuts and Bolts strip began running in the San Francisco Examiner in March of that year.

Winick, who is Jewish, was offended at Rainey's decision to wear a T-shirt depicting four guns arranged in the shape of a swastika, and by Rainey's refusal to accede to Winick's request not to wear it.

After filming of the season ended, Winick and Ling moved to Los Angeles to continue their relationship.

By August 1994, Zamora's health began to decline. After being hospitalized, he asked Winick to substitute for him at a national AIDS education lecture. When Zamora died on November 11, 1994, Winick and Ling were at his bedside. Winick would continue Zamora's educational work for some time after that.

=== 1994 – 2001 ===
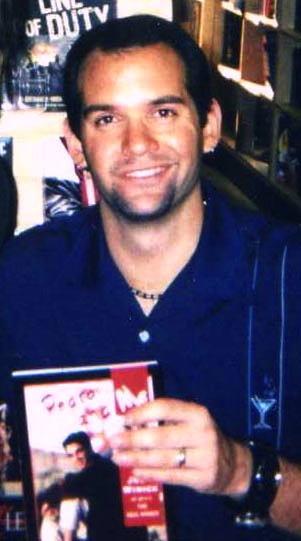
Winick at Midtown Comics Grand Central in New York City, June 24, 2004

Winick designed illustrations for The Complete Idiot's Guide to... series of books, and did over 300 of them, including that series’ computer-oriented line. A collection of the computer-related titles' cartoons was published in 1997 as Terminal Madness, The Complete Idiot's Guide Computer Cartoon Collection.

Winick produced his daily comic strip Frumpy the Clown from 1996 to 1998 syndicated through Creators Syndicate.

While working on Pedro and Me, Winick began working on comic books, beginning with a one-page Frumpy the Clown cartoon in Oni Press’ anthology series, Oni Double Feature #3, in 1998, before going on to do longer stories, like the two-part Road Trip, which was published in issues #9 and 10 of the same book. Road Trip went on to become an Eisner Award nominee for Best Sequential Story.

Winick followed up with a three-issue miniseries, The Adventures of Barry Ween, Boy Genius, about a cynical, profane grade school whiz kid, who invents a myriad of futuristic devices that no one other than his best friend knows about. Barry Ween was published by Image Comics from March through May 1999, with two subsequent miniseries, The Adventures of Barry Ween, Boy Genius 2.0 and The Adventures of Barry Ween, Boy Genius: Monkey Tales (Retitled The Adventures of Barry Ween, Boy Genius 3 or The Adventures of Barry Ween, Boy Genius: Gorilla Warfare in the collected editions), published by Oni Press, which published trade paperback collections of all three miniseries.

Winick’s graphic novel, Pedro and Me: Friendship, Loss, and What I Learned, was published in September 2000. It was awarded six American Library Association awards, was nominated for an Eisner Award, won Winick his first GLAAD award, has been praised by creators such as Frank Miller, Neil Gaiman, and Armistead Maupin, and has been incorporated into school curricula across the country.

=== DC Comics, television work and Hilo ===
Winick's work in mainstream superhero comics received attention for storylines in which he explores gay or AIDS-oriented themes. In his first regular writing assignment on a monthly superhero comic book, DC Comics' Green Lantern, Winick wrote a storyline in which Terry Berg, an assistant of the title character, emerged as a gay character in Green Lantern #137 (June 2001) and in Green Lantern #154 (November 2002) the story entitled "Hate Crime" gained media recognition when Terry was brutally beaten in a homophobic attack. Winick was interviewed on Phil Donahue's show on MSNBC for that storyline on August 15, 2002, and received two more GLAAD awards for his Green Lantern work.

In 2003, Judd Winick left Green Lantern for another DC series, Green Arrow, beginning with issue #26 of that title (July 2003). He gained more media recognition for Green Arrow #43 (December 2004) in which he revealed that Green Arrow's 17-year-old ward, a former runaway-turned prostitute named Mia Dearden, was HIV-positive. In issue #45 (February 2005), Winick had Dearden take on the identity of Speedy, the second such Green Arrow sidekick to bear that name. Dearden was the most prominent HIV-positive superhero to star in an ongoing comic book, a decision for which Winick was interviewed on CNN.

In 2003 Winick wrote a five-issue miniseries for DC's Vertigo imprint called Blood & Water, about a young man with terminal illness whose two friends reveal to him that they are vampires, and that they wish to save his life by turning him into a vampire himself.

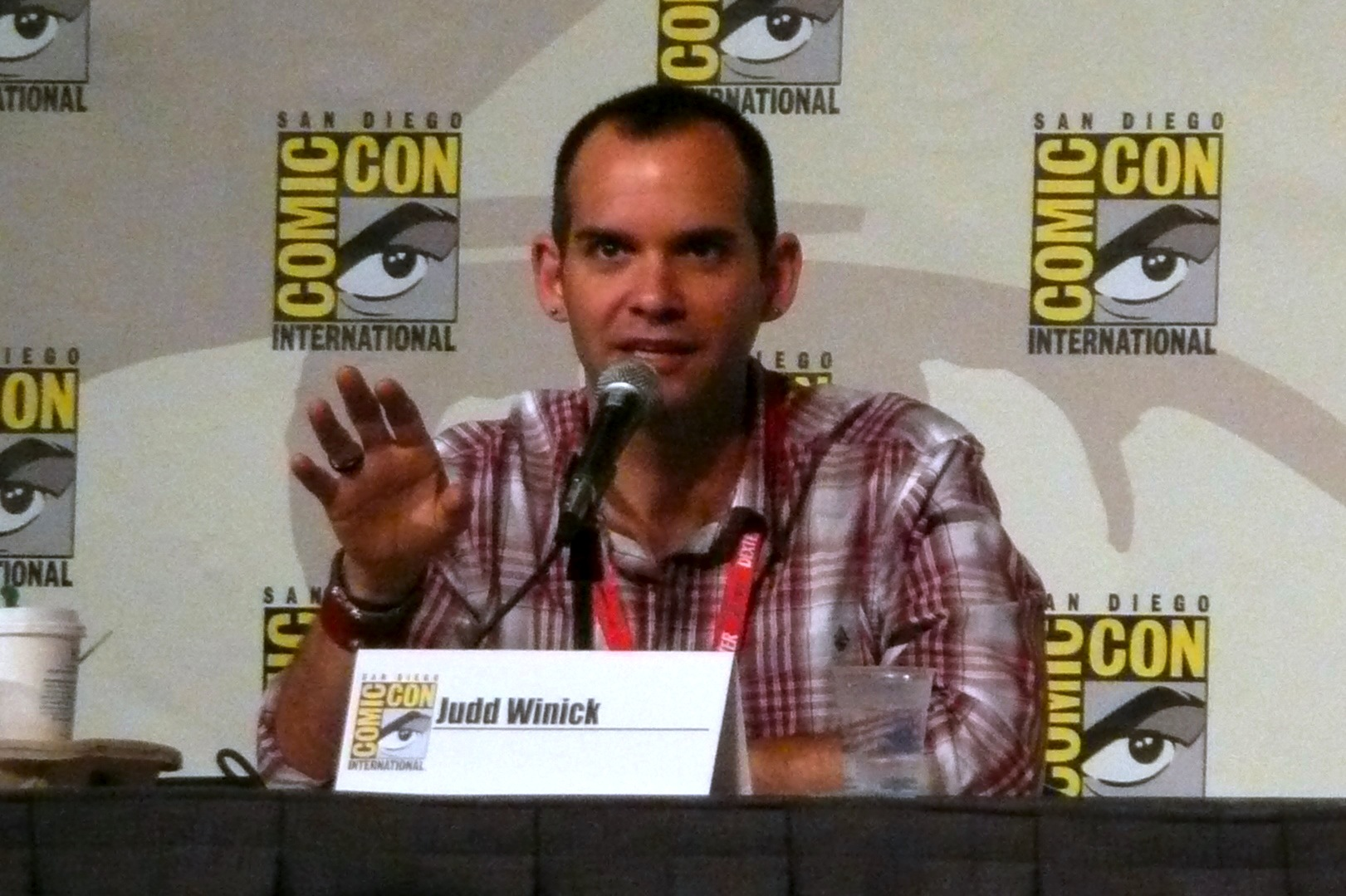
Winick at the 2010 San Diego Comic-Con

Winick's other comic book work includes Batman, The Outsiders, and Marvel's Exiles. In 2005 he co-wrote Countdown to Infinite Crisis, a one-shot comic that initiated the "Infinite Crisis" storyline, with Geoff Johns and Greg Rucka. Winick was responsible for bringing Jason Todd, the second character known as Batman's sidekick Robin, back from the dead, and making him the new Red Hood, the second such Batman villain by that name. That same year, Winick created an animated TV show named The Life and Times of Juniper Lee in 2005, which ran for three seasons on the Cartoon Network. Along with creating the show and the characters, he has also directed the voice actors alongside Susan Blu.

Between September 2005 and March 2006, Winick wrote the four-issue Captain Marvel/Superman limited series, Superman/Shazam: First Thunder with art by Josh Middleton. Winick continued his work with the Marvel Family in a 12-issue limited series titled The Trials Of Shazam!, and continued his Green Arrow work with 2007's Green Arrow/Black Canary Wedding Special, which led to the ongoing series Green Arrow and Black Canary, the first 14 issues of which Winick wrote. In November 2007, DC released a Teen Titans East special, a prequel for Titans, which was scripted by Winick. Following the "Battle for the Cowl" storyline, Winick took over the writing on Batman for four issues. He co-wrote the 26-issue biweekly Justice League: Generation Lost with Keith Giffen, a title which alternated with Brightest Day. In addition, he was a regular writer on the monthly Power Girl series.

Winick wrote the screenplay for the 2010 direct to DVD animated feature Batman: Under the Red Hood, which was based on the 1988–89 story arc "Batman: A Death in the Family" and the 2005 "Batman: Under the Hood" story arc that he wrote in the Batman comic book.

Beginning in September 2011, Winick began writing new Catwoman and Batwing ongoing series that were launched as part of DC Comics' reboot of its continuity, The New 52. The Catwoman series was criticized by some readers for its focus on Selina Kyle's sexuality, particularly scenes showing her sexual relationship with Batman. Winick responded that it was DC that desired this tone.

Winick was the head writer on The Awesomes, an animated superhero comedy series created by Seth Meyers and Mike Shoemaker for Hulu. It debuted on August 1, 2013, and ended on November 3, 2015.

In July 2012 Winick announced that he was leaving Catwoman after issue #12, in order to create an all-ages, original graphic novel called Hilo (pronounced "High-Low"), a move that Winick explained was inspired a year or so prior when his then-seven-year-old son asked to read his work. Not having age-appropriate material for him, Winick gave him Jeff Smith's Bone, which both father and son enjoyed, and decided to create an all-ages story that his son could read. The full color series, whose tone and visuals Winick describes as "part E.T., part Doctor Who, part Peanuts and Calvin and Hobbes", stars a small town boy named D.J. whose life takes an unexpected turn when a mysterious boy named Hilo falls from the sky, and takes D.J. and his friend Gina on adventures that include robots, aliens and a quest to save the world. The series represents Winick's first artwork since 2002's The Adventures of Barry Ween, Boy Genius: Gorilla Warfare, as well as his first children's book. It is published by Random House, with the first book published in September 2015. The deal was originally for three books, but the series has continued for over a decade, with a new volume coming out every year. The first two volumes of the Hilo series, Hilo, the Boy Who Crashed to Earth and Hilo, Saving the Whole Wide World, are New York Times bestsellers. The HILO series has successfully continued with the 11th book published in February 2025. In February 2026 a new series by Winick, HILO PRESENTS: THE MIGHTY was published by Random House.

== In popular culture ==
In Pedro, the 2008 film dramatizing Pedro Zamora's life, Winick is portrayed by Hale Appleman. Winick and his wife Pam Ling can be seen in a cameo in a scene where Jenn Liu and Alex Loynaz, as Ling and Zamora, are meeting on a staircase.

Winick is mentioned in Dave Eggers' A Heartbreaking Work of Staggering Genius.

== Personal life ==
After appearing on The Real World, Winick and his former costar, Pam Ling, began to date. Winick proposed to her with a cartoon he made for the occasion, and which he presented to her while wearing a gorilla suit. The cartoon presented Ling with two choices to answer his proposal. After she accepted his proposal, he summoned three singing Elvises. Winick and Ling married in a civil ceremony on August 26, 2001. Writer Armistead Maupin spoke at their ceremony. It marked the first time two cast members of The Real World married. As of September 2000, they lived in San Francisco's Upper Haight. As of 2024, they have two children, a son and a daughter, whom they work to keep out of the spotlight, preferring to omit photos of them from social media, and mention of their names in interviews.

== Bibliography ==
=== Early work ===
- Frumpy the Clown (script and art, daily newspaper strip distributed by Creators Syndicate, 1996–1998) collected by Oni Press as:
  - Freaking Out the Neighbors (collects strips published between July 1, 1996, and July 13, 1997, 136 pages, 2001, ISBN 1-929998-11-2)
  - The Fat Lady Sings (collects strips published between June 16, 1997, and June 7, 1998, 136 pages, 2001, ISBN 0-929998-12-X)
- Oni Double Feature (script and art, anthology, Oni Press):
  - "Frumpy the Clown" (one-page strip in #3, 1998)
  - "Road Trip" (in #9–10, 1998)
- The Adventures of Barry Ween, Boy Genius (script and art):
  - The Big Book of Barry Ween, Boy Genius (tpb, 376 pages, 2009, ISBN 1-934964-02-6) collects:
    - The Adventures of Barry Ween, Boy Genius #1–3 (Image, 1999) also collected as The Adventures of Barry Ween, Boy Genius (tpb, 88 pages, Oni Press, 2000, ISBN 1-929998-00-7)
    - The Adventures of Barry Ween, Boy Genius 2.0 #1–3 (Oni Press, 2000) also collected as The Adventures of Barry Ween, Boy Genius 2.0 (tpb, 88 pages, 2000, ISBN 1-929998-05-8)
    - The Adventures of Barry Ween, Boy Genius: Monkey Tales (Oni Press, 2001–2002) also collected as:
      - The Adventures of Barry Ween, Boy Genius: Monkey Tales (collects #1–3, tpb, 88 pages, 2001, ISBN 1-929998-18-X)
      - The Adventures of Barry Ween, Boy Genius: Gorilla Warfare (collects #4–6, tpb, 88 pages, 2002, ISBN 1-929998-19-8)
  - Whiteout: Melt #1 (untitled one-page strip featuring a crossover between Barry Ween and Carrie Stetko, Oni Press, 1999)
  - Oni Press Color Special '00: "Weenout" (another Barry Ween/Whiteout crossover, co-written by Winick and Greg Rucka, anthology, 2000)
  - Wizard Edge #1 (untitled three-page story in the annual special issue of the Wizard magazine, Wizard, 2002)
- Adventures @ eBay (as artist, co-written by Greg Rucka and Jen Van Meter, one-shot, eBay Publishing, 2000)
- Pedro and Me: Friendship, Loss, and What I Learned (script and art, graphic novel, 192 pages, Henry Holt and Company, 2000, ISBN 0-8050-6403-6)

=== DC Comics ===
- Green Lantern:
  - Green Lantern/Green Lantern (with Randy Green, one-shot, 2000) collected in Green Lantern: Circle of Fire (tpb, 224 pages, 2002, ISBN 1-56389-806-3)
  - Green Lantern vol. 3:
    - New Journey, Old Path (tpb, 192 pages, 2001, ISBN 1-56389-729-6) collects:
      - "Something Old, Something New" (with Darryl Banks, in #129–131, 2000)
      - "While Rome Burned" (with Darryl Banks, Mark D. Bright (#132–133) and Dale Eaglesham (#136), in #132–136, 2001)
    - "The Bonds of Friends and Lovers" (with Darryl Banks and Dale Eaglesham (#138), in #137–140, 2001)
    - Green Lantern: Our Worlds at War (with Dale Eaglesham, one-shot, 2001)
    - "House on Fire" (with Dale Eaglesham and Eric Battle, in #141–142, 2001)
    - The Power of Ion (tpb, 226 pages, 2003, ISBN 1-56389-972-8) collects:
      - "The Battle of Fire and Light" (with Dale Eaglesham, in #143–145, 2001–2002)
      - "Hand of God" (with Jamal Igle (#146), Dale Eaglesham and Brandon Badeaux (#148), in #146–149, 2002)
      - "Beginning's End" (with Pat Quinn and Dale Eaglesham, in #150, 2002)
    - Brother's Keeper (tpb, 128 pages, 2003, ISBN 1-4012-0078-8) collects:
      - Green Lantern Secret Files & Origins #3: "City Dwellers" (with Philip Bond, co-feature, 2002)
      - "Out of Our Heads" (with Dale Eaglesham and Eric Battle, in #151–152, 2002)
      - "Hate Crime" (with Dale Eaglesham, in #153–155, 2002)
    - Passing the Torch (tpb, 128 pages, 2004, ISBN 1-4012-0237-3) collects:
      - "John's Story: Walking Tall" (with Dale Eaglesham, in #156, 2003)
      - "Away from Home" (with Dale Eaglesham, in #158–159, 2003)
      - "Offspring" (with Dale Eaglesham, in #160–161, 2003)
    - Green Arrow: Archer's Quest Omnibus Volume 1 (hc, 1,128 pages, 2025, ISBN 1-7995-0068-3) includes:
      - "Black Circle: Urban Knights, Parts Two, Four, Six" (with Charlie Adlard, in #162–164, 2003)
- Justice Leagues: Justice League of Aliens: "Brother's Keepers" (with Mike S. Miller, one-shot, 2001)
- Transmetropolitan: Filth of the City (one-page illustration, text by Warren Ellis, one-shot, Vertigo, 2001)
  - Collected in Transmetropolitan: Tales of Human Waste (tpb, 112 pages, 2004, ISBN 1-4012-0244-6)
  - Collected in Absolute Transmetropolitan Volume 2 (hc, 560 pages, 2016, ISBN 1-4012-6115-9)
- Batman:
  - Harley and Ivy: Love on the Lam (with Joe Chiodo, one-shot, 2001) collected in Batman: Harley and Ivy (tpb, 136 pages, 2007, ISBN 1-4012-1333-2)
  - Detective Comics #763–772, 784: "Josie Mac" (with Cliff Chiang, co-feature, 2001–2003) + Secret Files & Origins Guide to the DC Universe 2001–2002: "Josie Mac" (profile page illustrated by Cliff Chiang, 2002)
  - Batman: Gotham Knights #47: "Riddle Me This" (with Whilce Portacio, co-feature, 2004) collected in Batman: Black and White Volume 3 (hc, 288 pages, 2007, ISBN 1-4012-1531-9; tpb, 2008, ISBN 1-4012-1354-5)
  - Batman (with Dustin Nguyen, Doug Mahnke, Paul Lee (#640), Shane Davis (#646), Eric Battle (#649–650), 2004–2006; with Ed Benes (#687) and Mark Bagley, 2009) collected as:
    - As the Crow Flies (collects #626–630, tpb, 128 pages, 2004, ISBN 1-4012-0344-2)
    - Under the Hood Volume 1 (collects #635–641, tpb, 176 pages, 2005, ISBN 1-4012-0756-1)
    - Under the Hood Volume 2 (collects #645–650 and Annual #25, tpb, 192 pages, 2006, ISBN 1-4012-0901-7)
    - Under the Red Hood (collects #635–641, 645–650 and Annual #25, tpb, 384 pages, 2011, ISBN 1-4012-3145-4)
    - Long Shadows (collects #687–691, hc, 128 pages, 2010, ISBN 1-4012-2719-8; tpb, 2011, ISBN 1-4012-2720-1)
  - Superman/Batman #76: "The Brave and the Bold" (with Marco Rudy, 2010) collected in Final Crisis Omnibus (hc, 1,512 pages, 2018, ISBN 1-4012-8503-1)
  - Red Hood: The Lost Days #1–6 (with Pablo Raimondi and Jeremy Haun, 2010–2011) collected as Red Hood: The Lost Days (tpb, 144 pages, 2011, ISBN 1-4012-3164-0)
  - Batman and Robin #23–25 (with Guillem March and Greg Tocchini, 2011) collected in Batman and Robin: Dark Knight vs. White Knight (hc, 208 pages, 2012, ISBN 1-4012-3373-2; tpb, 2013, ISBN 1-4012-3539-5)
  - Batwing (with Ben Oliver, ChrisCross (#4), Dustin Nguyen (#7–8) and Marcus To, 2011–2013) collected as:
    - The Lost Kingdom (collects #1–6, tpb, 144 pages, 2012, ISBN 1-4012-3476-3)
    - In the Shadow of the Ancients (collects #7–12 and 0, tpb, 160 pages, 20013, ISBN 1-4012-3791-6)
    - Enemy of the State (includes #13–14, tpb, 144 pages, 2014, ISBN 1-4012-4403-3)
  - Catwoman vol. 3 (with Guillem March and Adriana Melo (#7–8 and 11–12), 2011–2012) collected as:
    - The Game (collects #1–6, tpb, 144 pages, 2012, ISBN 1-4012-3464-X)
    - Dollhouse (collects #7–12, tpb, 144 pages, 2013, ISBN 1-4012-3839-4)
  - Batman: The Dark Knight vol. 2 #9: "I Can No Longer be Broken" (with David Finch, 2012) collected in Batman: The Dark Knight — Knight Terrors (hc, 208 pages, 2012, ISBN 1-4012-3543-3; tpb, 2013, ISBN 1-4012-3711-8)
  - Robin: 80th Anniversary 100-Page Super Spectacular: "Red Hood: More Time" (with Dustin Nguyen, anthology one-shot, 2020) collected in Batman: 80 Years of the Bat Family (tpb, 400 pages, 2020, ISBN 1-77950-658-9)
- Green Arrow:
  - Green Arrow vol. 3 (with Phil Hester, Manuel García (#32), Tom Fowler, Eric Battle (#49), Tommy Castillo (#50), Ron Garney (#55–57), Ron Lim (#57), Paul Lee (#58–59) and Scott McDaniel, 2003–2007) collected as:
    - Straight Shooter (collects #26–31, tpb, 144 pages, 2004, ISBN 1-4012-0200-4)
    - City Walls (collects #32 and 34–39, tpb, 160 pages, 2005, ISBN 1-4012-0464-3)
    - Moving Targets (collects #40–50, tpb, 256 pages, 2006, ISBN 1-4012-0930-0)
    - Heading into the Light (collects #52 and 54–59, tpb, 160 pages, 2006, ISBN 1-4012-1094-5)
    - Crawling through the Wreckage (collects #60–65, tpb, 144 pages, 2007, ISBN 1-4012-1232-8)
    - Road to Jericho (collects #66–75, tpb, 240 pages, 2007, ISBN 1-4012-1508-4)
    - Archer's Quest Omnibus Volume 1 (includes #26–32 and 34–39, hc, 1,128 pages, 2025, ISBN 1-7995-0068-3)
    - Archer's Quest Omnibus Volume 2 (includes #40–50, 52, 54–75, hc, 1,032 pages, 2027, ISBN 1-7995-1644-X)
  - Green Arrow and Black Canary (with Cliff Chiang, André Coelho (#5) and Mike Norton, 2007–2009) collected as:
    - The Wedding Album (collects #1–5, hc, 176 pages, 2008, ISBN 1-4012-1841-5; tpb, 2009, ISBN 1-4012-2219-6)
      - Includes Green Arrow and Black Canary Wedding Special (written by Winick, art by Amanda Conner, 2007)
    - Family Business (collects #6–10, tpb, 128 pages, 2009, ISBN 1-4012-2016-9)
    - A League of Their Own (collects #11–14, tpb, 128 pages, 2009, ISBN 1-4012-2250-1)
      - Includes the "Parting Shot" short story (art by Diego Barreto) from Green Arrow Secret Files & Origins (one-shot, 2002)
    - Till Death Do They Part (collects #1–14 and Green Arrow and Black Canary Wedding Special, tpb, 392 pages, 2021, ISBN 1-77950-929-4)
  - Green Arrow vol. 5 #0: "Make It Right" (with Freddie Williams II, 2012) collected in Green Arrow: Harrow (tpb, 144 pages, 2013, ISBN 1-4012-4405-X)
- Blood + Water #1–5 (with Tomm Coker, Vertigo, 2003) collected as Blood + Water (tpb, 128 pages, 2009, ISBN 1-4012-0175-X)
- Titans/Young Justice: Graduation Day #1–3 (with Alé Garza, 2003) collected as Titans/Young Justice: Graduation Day (tpb, 56 pages, 2003, ISBN 1-4012-0176-8)
- The Outsiders vol. 3 (with Tom Raney, ChrisCross (#4–6), Will Conrad (#11), Tom Derenick (#12), Dan Jurgens (#16), Carlos D'Anda, Karl Kerschl (#20), Shawn Moll (#22–23), Matthew Clark and Ron Randall, 2003–2007) collected as:
  - Looking for Trouble (collects #1–7, tpb, 192 pages, 2004, ISBN 1-4012-0211-X)
    - Includes the "A Day After..." short story (co-written by Winick and Geoff Johns, art by Carlo Barberi and Ivan Reis) from Teen Titans/Outsiders Secret Files (one-shot, 2003)
  - Sum of All Evil (collects #8–15, tpb, 144 pages, 2004, ISBN 1-4012-0243-8)
  - Wanted (collects #16–23, tpb, 192 pages, 2005, ISBN 1-4012-0460-0)
  - Teen Titans/The Outsiders: The Insiders (includes #24–25 and 28, tpb, 144 pages, 2006, ISBN 1-4012-0926-2)
  - Crisis Intervention (includes #29–31, tpb, 128 pages, 2006, ISBN 1-4012-0973-4)
  - The Good Fight (collects #34–41, tpb, 192 pages, 2007, ISBN 1-4012-1195-X)
  - Pay as You Go (collects #42–46 and Annual, tpb, 128 pages, 2007, ISBN 1-4012-1366-9)
  - The Outsiders/Checkmate: Checkout (collects #47–49 and Checkmate vol. 2 #13–15, tpb, 144 pages, 2008, ISBN 1-4012-1623-4)
    - All issues of the crossover — The Outsiders vol. 3 #47–49 and Checkmate vol. 2 #13–15 — are co-written by Winick and Greg Rucka.
- Caper #1–12 (with Farel Dalrymple (#1–4), John Severin (#5–8) and Tom Fowler (#9–12), 2003–2004)
- Superman/ThunderCats (with Alé Garza, one-shot, Wildstorm, 2004)
- Masks: Too Hot for TV!: "Uncensored!" (with Whilce Portacio, anthology one-shot, Eye of the Storm, 2004)
- Infinite Crisis Omnibus (hc, 1,152 pages, 2012, ISBN 1-4012-3502-6) includes:
  - Countdown to Infinite Crisis (co-written by Winick, Geoff Johns and Greg Rucka, art by Rags Morales, Ed Benes, Jesús Saiz, Ivan Reis and Phil Jimenez, one-shot, 2005)
  - Action Comics #826 + Adventures of Superman #639 + Superman vol. 2 #216: "Lightning Strikes Twice" (with Ian Churchill, 2005) also collected in Day of Vengeance (tpb, 224 pages, 2005, ISBN 1-4012-0840-1)
- Captain Marvel:
  - Superman/Shazam: First Thunder #1–4 (with Joshua Middleton, 2005–2006) collected as Superman/Shazam: First Thunder (tpb, 128 pages, 2006, ISBN 1-4012-0923-8; hc, 144 pages, 2018, ISBN 1-4012-8537-6)
  - The Trials of Shazam!: The Complete Series (tpb, 312 pages, 2019, ISBN 1-4012-9229-1) collects:
    - DCU: Brave New World: "The Trials of Shazam!" (with Howard Porter, anthology one-shot, 2006)
    - The Trials of Shazam! #1–12 (with Howard Porter and Mauro Cascioli (#9–12), 2006–2008)
- The Titans vol. 2 (with Ian Churchill, Joe Benitez, Julian López and Howard Porter, 2008–2009) collected as:
  - Old Friends (collects #1–6, hc, 200 pages, 2009, ISBN 1-4012-1991-8; tpb, 2010, ISBN 1-4012-2019-3)
    - Includes Titans East Special (written by Winick, art by Ian Churchill, 2008)
  - Lockdown (collects #7–10, tpb, 128 pages, 2009, ISBN 1-4012-2476-8)
- DC Universe: Decisions #1–4 (co-written by Winick and Bill Willingham, art by Rick Leonardi and Howard Porter, 2008)
- Justice League: Generation Lost (with Aaron Lopresti, Joe Bennett and Fernando Dagnino, 2010–2011) collected as:
  - Volume 1 (collects #1–12, hc, 320 pages, 2011, ISBN 1-4012-3020-2)
  - Volume 2 (collects #13–24, hc, 320 pages, 2011, ISBN 1-4012-3283-3)
- Power Girl (with Sami Basri and Hendry Prasetya (#24–25), 2010–2011) collected as:
  - Bomb Squad (collects #13–18, tpb, 144 pages, 2011, ISBN 1-4012-3162-4)
  - Old Friends (collects #19–25, tpb, 200 pages, 2012, ISBN 1-4012-3365-1)
  - New Beginnings and Old Friends Omnibus (includes #13–25, hc, 880 pages, 2026, ISBN 1-7995-0872-2)
- Superman: Red and Blue #5: "Fetch" (with Ibrahim Moustafa, anthology, 2021) collected in Superman: Red and Blue (hc, 272 pages, 2021, ISBN 1-77951-280-5; tpb, 2022, ISBN 1-77951-747-5)

=== Other publishers ===
- Marvel:
  - Blink #2–4 (with Trevor McCarthy, 2001)
    - Scripted by Winick, plotted by Scott Lobdell.
    - Collected in X-Men: The Complete Age of Apocalypse Volume 1 (tpb, 376 pages, 2006, ISBN 0-7851-1714-8)
    - Collected in X-Men: The Age of Apocalypse Omnibus Companion (hc, 992 pages, 2014, ISBN 0-7851-8514-3)
  - Exiles (with Mike McKone, Jim Calafiore, Kev Walker (#23–25), Tom Mandrake (#33), Clayton Henry (#35 and 37) and Mizuki Sakakibara (#36), 2001–2004) collected as:
    - Ultimate Collection: Exiles Volume 1 (collects #1–19, tpb, 480 pages, 2009, ISBN 0-7851-3887-0)
    - Ultimate Collection: Exiles Volume 2 (collects #20–25 and 31–37, tpb, 440 pages, 2009, ISBN 0-7851-3888-9)
- Star Wars: A Valentine Story (with Paul Chadwick, one-shot, Dark Horse, 2003) collected in Star Wars: Empire — The Heart of the Rebellion (tpb, 152 pages, 2005, ISBN 1-59307-308-9)
- Liberty Annual '11 (untitled two-page story with Thiago Micalopulos, anthology, Image, 2011) collected in CBLDF Presents: Liberty (hc, 216 pages, 2014, ISBN 1-60706-937-7; tpb, 2016, ISBN 1-60706-996-2)
- A Town Called Dragon #1–5 (with Geoff Shaw, Legendary, 2014–2015) collected as A Town Called Dragon (tpb, 200 pages, 2015, ISBN 1-937278-40-9)
- Random House:
  - Hilo (script and art, series of graphic novels):
    - The Boy Who Crashed to Earth (hc, 208 pages, 2015, ISBN 0-385-38617-6; sc, 2016, ISBN 0-14-137692-9)
    - Saving the Whole Wide World (hc, 208 pages, 2016, ISBN 0-385-38623-0; sc, 2016, ISBN 0-14-137690-2)
    - The Great Big Boom (hc, 208 pages, 2017, ISBN 0-385-38620-6; sc, 2017, ISBN 0-14-137680-5)
    - Waking the Monsters (hc, 208 pages, 2018, ISBN 1-5247-1493-3; sc, 2024, ISBN 0-241-71170-3)
    - Then Everything Went Wrong (hc, 208 pages, 2019, ISBN 1-5247-1496-8; sc, 2025, ISBN 0-241-71191-6)
    - All the Pieces Fit (hc, 224 pages, 2020, ISBN 0-525-64406-7; sc, 2025, ISBN 0-241-71194-0)
    - Gina—The Girl Who Broke the World (hc, 224 pages, 2021, ISBN 0-525-64409-1; sc, 2025, ISBN 0-241-75991-9)
    - Gina and the Big Secret (hc, 224 pages, 2022, ISBN 0-593-37967-5; sc, 2025, ISBN 0-241-75994-3)
    - Gina and the Last City on Earth (hc, 240 pages, 2023, ISBN 0-593-48809-1; sc, 2025, ISBN 0-241-75997-8)
    - Rise of the Cat (hc, 240 pages, 2024, ISBN 0-593-48812-1; sc, 2025, ISBN 0-241-76001-1)
    - The Great Space Iguana (hc, 240 pages, 2025, ISBN 0-593-80709-X; sc, 2025, ISBN 0-241-76005-4)
    - The Holiday Special (hc, 224 pages, 2026, ISBN 0-593-80717-0)
  - Hilo Presents: The Mighty (script and art, graphic novel, 240 pages, 2026, ISBN 0-593-30530-2)
- Love is Love (one-page illustration, anthology graphic novel, 144 pages, IDW Publishing, 2016, ISBN 1-63140-939-5)
- Garfield: Unreality TV: "Dream Big" (script and art, anthology graphic novel, 96 pages, KaBOOM!, 2017, ISBN 1-60886-975-X)

== Screenwriting credits ==
=== Television ===
- The Life and Times of Juniper Lee (2005–2007)
- The Awesomes (2013–2015)

=== Film ===
- Batman: Under the Red Hood (2010)

== Awards and nominations ==
=== Wins ===
- 2000 Publishers Weekly Best Book, for Pedro and Me
- 2000 Bay Area Book Reviewers Award for Best in Children's Literature, for Pedro and Me
- 2001 Robert F. Sibert Informational Book Honor Award, for Pedro and Me
- 2001 American Library Association Notable Children's Book citation, for Pedro and Me
- 2001 American Library Association Gay, Lesbian, Bisexual, Transgender Roundtable Nonfiction Honor book, for Pedro and Me
- 2001 American Library Association Best Books for Young Adults, for Pedro and Me
- 2001 American Library Association Popular Paperbacks for Young Adults, for Pedro and Me
- 2001 American Library Association Quick Picks for Reluctant Young Adult Readers, for Pedro and Me
- Young Adult Library Services Association Quick Pick for Reluctant Readers, for Pedro and Me
- YALSA Notable Graphic Novels, for Pedro and Me
- Bulletin Blue Ribbon Book, for Pedro and Me
- America's Award for Children's and Young Adult Literature Highly Recommended List (Award sponsored by the National Consortium of Latin American Studies Programs—CLASP), for Pedro and Me
- 2001 GLAAD Media Award for Outstanding Comic, for Pedro and Me
- 2002 GLAAD Media Award for Outstanding Comic, for Green Lantern
- 2003 GLAAD Media Award for Outstanding Comic, for Green Lantern

=== Nominations ===
- 2000 Eisner Award Nomination for Best Original Graphic Novel, for Pedro and Me
- 2001 American Library Association Stonewall Book Award Nominee, for Pedro and Me
- South Carolina Young Adult Book Award Nominee (2003–2004), for Pedro and Me
- 19th GLAAD Media Award for Best Comic Book, for The Outsiders (shared with Greg Rucka and Tony Bedard)

Preceded by Ron Marz	Green Lantern writer 2000–2003	Succeeded by Ben Raab
Preceded by n/a	Exiles writer 2001–2004	Succeeded by Chuck Austen
Preceded by Brad Meltzer	Green Arrow writer 2003–2009	Succeeded by Andrew Kreisberg
Preceded by Mike W. Barr	The Outsiders writer 2003–2007	Succeeded by Chuck Dixon
Preceded by Brian Azzarello	Batman writer 2004–2006	Succeeded by James Robinson
Preceded by Tom Peyer	The Titans writer 2008–2009	Succeeded by Sean McKeever
Preceded by Grant Morrison	Batman writer 2009	Succeeded by Tony Daniel
Preceded by Peter Tomasi	Batman and Robin writer 2011	Succeeded by Peter Tomasi
Preceded by n/a	Batwing writer 2011–2013	Succeeded by Fabian Nicieza
Preceded by Will Pfeifer	Catwoman writer 2011–2012	Succeeded by Ann Nocenti
