= Pam Ling =

American physician

- Born: April 21, 1968 (age 58); Los Angeles, California, United States
- Education: Harvard University, UCSF
- Occupations: Physician, reality television personality
- Spouse: Judd Winick (m. 2001)
- Children: 2

Pam Ling (born April 21, 1968) is an American physician and television personality, best known as a castmate on The Real World: San Francisco, the third season of MTV's long-running reality television show.

== On the Real World ==
On the show, Ling was a Phi Beta Kappa member from Harvard, an overachiever, and in her third year of medical school. In the first few weeks of their stay in the house, she was finishing up a difficult rotation. Like castmate Mohammed Bilal, she was one of the more calm and low-key roommates and was one of the last roommates that Puck would agree to talk to during conflict resolutions with the rest of the house. She became close with castmates Pedro Zamora and Judd Winick, and the three became inseparable, with Cory joining them halfway through their stay in San Francisco.

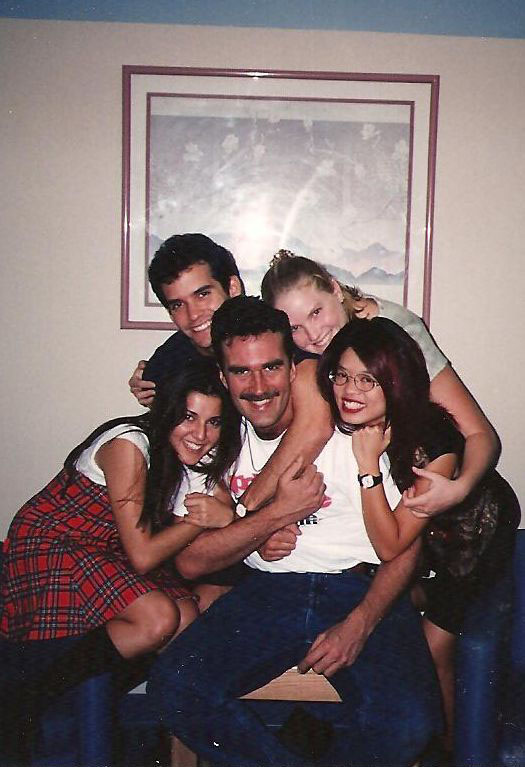
Alex Escarano (centre) with (behind, left to right) Rachel Campos, Judd Winick, Cory Murphy and Pam Ling at Mercy Hospital, Miami, Florida.

She attempted to maintain a long-distance relationship with her then-boyfriend Chris, and the roommates surprised her by having him visit San Francisco on her birthday, putting on a mock presentation of This Is Your Life, with a tuxedo-wearing Winick as the announcer and her boyfriend as the final person to appear. Unbeknownst to anyone, Winick had developed feelings of his own for Ling, and after she would get home late at night from work and fall asleep with a book across her lap and a pen in her hand, Winick would turn off her bedside lamp, put the book away, and cover her up. Ling and Winick supported Zamora by attending his lectures whenever they could.

== After the Real World ==
Ling's relationship with Chris ended after the show, and she began a romantic relationship with Winick. They visited Zamora in his hometown of Miami as he was hospitalized and their feelings deepened during their visits. On November 11, 1994, the day after the last San Francisco "Real World" episode aired, Zamora died. Ling and Winick began dating in 1995 and moved in together. They announced their relationship at a Real World Reunion Special which brought together the casts of the first four seasons. After dating for five years, Winick proposed to Ling with a cartoon he made for the occasion, and which he presented to her while wearing a gorilla suit. The cartoon presented Ling with two choices to answer his proposal. After she accepted his proposal, he summoned three singing Elvis Presley impersonators. Winick and Ling married in a civil ceremony on August 26, 2001. Writer Armistead Maupin spoke at their ceremony. As of 2008, they have two children.

The couple continues Pedro Zamora's work in AIDS education. Ling completed her residency in primary care at the University of California, San Francisco in 1999, and entered into an AIDS-research fellowship. Pamela Ling is internationally known for research in tobacco related to tobacco marketing, tobacco industry strategies targeting youth and young adults, marketing of novel tobacco products, and novel interventions to prevent smoking and promote smoking cessation among priority populations. She is Director of the UCSF Center for Tobacco Control Research and Education, and she is an experienced transdisciplinary mentor for early-career researchers from a variety of fields. Her clinical practice is in general internal medicine. (https://medicine.ucsf.edu/people/pamela-ling) Her husband lectures about AIDS and wrote a book about the life of Zamora entitled Pedro and Me (2000).

== In popular culture ==
In Pedro, Nick Oceano's 2008 film dramatizing Pedro Zamora's life, Ling is portrayed by Jenn Liu. Ling and Winnick can be seen in a cameo in a scene in which Jenn Liu and Alex Loynaz, as Ling and Zamora, are meeting up on a set of stairs.

She is also mentioned in The Bloodhound Gang's song Yellow Fever.

== Sources and external links ==
- Pedro and Me: Friendship, Loss, and What I Learned by Judd Winick (2000; Henry Holt & Co.)
- The Real World Diaries (1996; Pocket Books; MTV Books)
