= List of Transformers books =

There have been many publishers of a book (some with accompanying audio cassettes) bearing the name Transformers based on the toy lines of the same name. Most common are Ballantine Books and Ladybird Books.

== Novels ==
=== The Transformers Trilogy ===
Title	Author	Publisher	Date	Length	Plot	Ref.
Transformers: Hardwired	Scott Ciencin	ibooks	June 11, 2003	332 pp	Set in the Dreamwave continuity at a point between their first and second Generation One miniseries, Hardwired followed Prime, Megatron, Jazz and other Transformers as they were abducted by a mysterious alien race known as the Keepers and forced to fight in gladiatorial combat. On Earth, Starscream took command of the Decepticons and took over Las Vegas, leaving Grimlock (not trusted due to his actions in the first miniseries) to lead the remaining Autobots to stop him. The novel ended with the abducted Transformers returning to Earth - with Bluestreak and several humans possessed by the Keepers.	
Transformers: Annihilation	David Cian	ibooks	September 5, 2003	234 pp	In Annihilation, Megatron attempts to reclaim his leadership of the Decepticons, but is defeated by Starscream and Devastator as Prime attempts to rally the Autobots. Megatron walks out of the Decepticons with a band of devoted followers to ally with the Autobots against the Keepers (who now possess many of the Autobots and Decepticons). They defeat them, but Megatron claims his "favor" for helping the Autobots - to become the next Matrix bearer.	
Transformers: Fusion	David Cian	ibooks	January 1, 2004	222 pp	In Fusion, Prime gives Megatron the Matrix, unwilling to break his word of honor, as the possessed Autobots and Decepticons return to normal. However, the Keepers are not yet defeated and plan to return to Earth via a warpgate as the US military tries once more to destroy all the Transformers. In the end, the Keepers are defeated when Megatron's reprogrammed Omega Sentinel, turned good by exposure to the Matrix, sacrifices itself and Devastator to close the gate.	

=== Live-action film series ===
Title	Author	Publisher	Date	Length	Ref.
Transformers: Ghosts of Yesterday	Alan Dean Foster	Del Rey Books	March 27, 2007	286 pp	
Transformers	Alan Dean Foster	Del Rey Books	May 29, 2007	291 pp	
Transformers: The Veiled Threat	Alan Dean Foster	Del Rey Books	April 28, 2009	281 pp	
Transformers: Revenge of the Fallen	Alan Dean Foster	Del Rey Books	May 19, 2009	325 pp	
Transformers: Dark of the Moon	Peter David	Del Rey Books	May 24, 2011	393 pp	
Transformers Classified: The Complete Mission	Ryder Windham and Jason Fry	Little, Brown and Company	April 22, 2014	471 pp	

==== Transformers: Ghosts of Yesterday ====
Transformers: Ghosts of Yesterday
- Author: Alan Dean Foster
- Language: English
- Series: Transformers
- Genre: Science fiction novel
- Publisher: Del Ray
- Publication date: March 2007 (1st edition)
- Publication place: United States
- Media type: Print (paperback)
- Pages: 304
- ISBN: 0-345-49798-8
- OCLC: 86174936
- Followed by: Transformers

Transformers: Ghosts of Yesterday is a science fiction novel written by Alan Dean Foster. 'It is a prequel to the Michael Bay Transformers film. It is based on a story by David Cian.

The story is set in 1969 and details the account of a top secret space ship called Ghost-1, built by the American organization known as Sector 7. The ship was built by examining and reverse engineering the frozen remains of the Transformer Megatron. Sent into space at the same time as Apollo 11 to hide its trail, the ship is sent to orbit the far side of Jupiter to look for any more alien activity. However, the ship falls into a wormhole that was apparently accidentally created by them due to a slingshot around the Sun and emerges in an unknown part of the galaxy - where it is not alone. The Ark and the Nemesis arrive, intrigued by the ship's Cybertronian design. Starscream leads the Decepticons on an attack as the humans flee. Bumblebee pursues them, as does Starscream, who hopes to annihilate the ship - and any traces of Megatron with it. Putting Bumblebee to flight, Starscream communicates with Ghost-1, pretending to be benevolent. Scanning their computers, he learns of the existence of the Allspark and Megatron and decides to string them along by telling them of the war. He hopes to provoke them into firing on the "evil" Autobots, who will destroy them. Optimus Prime arrives, having fought off Blackout's attack in orbit, saving Bumblebee from giant rock-chewing worms. They encounter Starscream and Ghost-1, who fire on them, burying them in the cave with more worms.

The humans, meanwhile, have become suspicious of Starscream's intentions, noting differences in the behaviors of his and Prime's. When their ship sinks into a sinkhole, Starscream betrays them and leaves them for dead. When Prime and Bumblebee cross paths with the ship underground, the Autobots communicate with the humans, who tell them of the in-stasis Megatron. Knowing that Megatron would decimate their people if he reactivated, Prime vowed to see the humans return to Earth to warn it. They eventually free themselves and head back into orbit, where a full-scale assault by the Decepticons is under way. Despite the Autobots' courage, they are outnumbered. Captain Walker of Ghost-1 makes the decision that they cannot flee, since doing so would lead the Decepticons straight to Earth. The wormhole eventually collapses as they prepare their attack on Starscream, which leaves them stranded. They fire on Starscream as he and Bonecrusher prepare to finish off Prime. Starscream annihilates them in retaliation and retreats, severely wounded. Prime laments their sacrifice, but had already begun to suspect that the Allspark was the reason Megatron went to Earth. Knowing that Starscream would seek Earth merely for revenge on the humans injuring him, Prime resolves to locate Earth before the Decepticons do.

On Earth, a different crisis unfolds. An order has come through to transport the frozen "Ice Man" from the Arctic to a place of safe keeping somewhere near the West Coast of the United States, to be studied more concretely. The convoy carrying him is sabotaged and derailed by a Soviet spy, who indicates a KGB assault will take place to recover Megatron. A more immediate problem presents itself when it is revealed that Megatron is thawing out. As the weather worsens and the Russian attack begins, Megatron reanimates. Lieutenant Colonel Nolan and Colonel Thomas Kinnear, both of them seasoned and fine commanders from Sector 7, managed to stop the disorientated Decepticon leader by first driving a snow truck into him, then freezing him once more with liquid Nitrogen even as he killed them both. The soldiers, under the command of the tenacious and resilient officer Lieutenant Jenson, fought off the Russian attack with the aid of a squad of Army Rangers, then resolve to complete Megatron's transportation.

The mission to move Megatron from the Arctic to the Hoover Dam is undertaken in 1969 (concurrent with the Apollo 11 Moon mission) — however both the movie and prequel comic series state that Megatron was relocated in the mid-late 1930s. To further complicate the issue, the prequel and the movie conflict, as the movie states Megatron was moved and cryo-frozen in 1934, yet construction on the dam was not completed until 1935 (and the prequel comic shows the interior of the Dam in 1935, with Megatron clearly not present and characters discussing his then-upcoming move to the Dam). Also, the Decepticons are depicted in the novel as traveling in a spacecraft, but the movie and Target-exclusive prequel comic included with the DVD shows the Decepticons traveling to Earth as protoforms. This is later explained in the IDW comics in that the Decepticons left their ship on Mars and traveled to Earth as protoforms.

==== Transformers: The Veiled Threat ====
Transformers: The Veiled Threat
- Author: Alan Dean Foster
- Language: English
- Series: Transformers
- Genre: Novel, Science fiction
- Publisher: Del Ray
- Publication date: April 2009
- Publication place: United States
- Media type: Print (Paperback)
- Pages: 281
- ISBN: 978-0-345-51592-6
- OCLC: 262433306
- Followed by: Transformers: Revenge of the Fallen

Transformers: The Veiled Threat is a science fiction novel set in between the events of the 2007 movie Transformers and its 2009 sequel Transformers: Revenge of the Fallen. Alan Dean Foster, author of another Transformers novel and the novelizations of both movies, is the author of this novel also. The 304-page paperback novel was released April 2009. Foster is an established science fiction writer, having written many novels for both original and existing media properties such as Aliens, Star Trek, and Star Wars.

In the novel's present-day, Megatron lies dead, at the bottom of the sea. Cut to the Gulf of Aden where pirates attack a freighter which just so happens to be ferrying Epps, Lennox, Ironhide, Ratchet, and other NEST (Networked Elements: Supporters and Transformers) members to their base on Diego Garcia. Ironhide soon transforms to robot mode and scares the pirates off. Arriving at Diego Garcia, the boys meet up with cybernetics expert Kaminari Ishihara, who has been swimming in the lagoon with the newly arrived Autobot veteran Longarm serving as lifeguard. Everyone enters a briefing where a sighting of Starscream in Zambia is discussed and a plan is hatched with Optimus Prime to confront him.

Meanwhile, we find that Agent Simmons is now, with the disbanding of Sector Seven, working in his mother's deli in New York. He's also tinkering with Frenzy's disembodied head in his basement. In Africa, we learn that Starscream is not only in the area, he's gaining control over local rebel groups by using his internal synthesizers to create gold coins. He is also accompanied by three other Decepticons: Dropkick, Macerator, and Payload. They soon attack a local dam construction site, making short work of the security forces, and proceed to steal mass quantities of explosives.

The NEST team soon arrives in Africa with Prime, Ironhide, and Ratchet as well as new arrivals: Salvage and Beachbreak. The Autobots soon engage Dropkick, Macerator, and Payload in battle in the Zambezi River. This is all part of Starscream's brilliant plan, however, as the Autobots soon discover that the current is pushing them towards Victoria Falls. Everyone but Prime and Macerator gets out in time, as the dueling pair going over the side. Starscream swoops in to save Macerator while Prime dangles helplessly. Eventually the NEST team manages to haul Prime up using Beachbreak's tow-cable, but the celebration is short lived as Starscream swoops in and knocks the diminutive Beachbreak off the waterfalls and to his death.

The Autobots and their human allies soon realize that Starscream may try and destroy a series of dams along the Zambezi and head off after the fleeing Decepticons. At one of the dams, the ground-based Decepticons attack. Payload heads to the valley floor to try to crack the dam with repeated blasts while Dropkick and Macerator fend off the arriving Autobots.

After a short scuffle, Prime manages to knock Macerator over the side of the dam before dispatching his dangling foe with his built-in sword. Ratchet takes repeated hits from Payload while trying to melt the fissures in the cracking dam back together. Both Ratchet and the dam are ultimately saved when the humans enter the dam and open the flood gates, knocking Payload downriver. A damaged Dropkick escapes and everyone returns to Diego Garcia.

Again, we cut back to Simmons in his basement, experimenting on Frenzy and brooding that that ("punk kid") Sam Witwicky has a "hot girlfriend" and is going to Princeton University. Frenzy suddenly comes to life and tries to subvert the building's electrical system. And after a little chaos, Simmons decides he needs to move the Decepticon head to a space beneath his mother's deli.

Back at NEST headquarters, two more Decepticon presences are detected and a pair of teams is readied to head out and take care of them. Epps and Russian scientist Petr Andronov accompany Longarm and the impetuous young motorcycle Knockout to Peru to find the Decepticons that have been detected in the deep jungles. On a steep mountain pass, the party is attacked by Decepticons Ruination and Blademaster. Despite inexperienced and risky behavior by Knockout, both are severely damaged and driven off.

Simultaneously, Lennox, Ishihara, Prime, Ironhide, and Salvage arrive in the Western Australian Outback and begin searching for Decepticons. Lennox soon realizes that the ‘Cons are attacking sites with energy reserves; oil and coal in Peru; and uranium in Australia. The team decides that there is a second group of Decepticons not under Starscream's command, harvesting massive amounts of energy in an attempt to revive Megatron.

Arriving at a uranium mining site, the NEST team discovers a trio of construction vehicles which, naturally, turn out to be Decepticons. The leader, Kickback, takes Prime on and is quickly run through with the Autobot leader's sword. The other two, Tread and Trample, are quickly killed through the combined efforts of the rest of the team.

Back at Diego Garcia, a small crab-like Decepticon infiltrates the base and hacks into the NEST computers before sneaking back into the sea and rendezvous with an unknown accomplice. Despite the break-in, the NEST team continues their usual business; discussing different ways the Decepticons could draw massive quantities of power to revive Megatron.

In Italy, Starscream enters into a deal with an Italian criminal named Bruno Carrera to help destroy Optimus Prime in exchange for dominion over Europe when the Decepticons triumph. A plan is hatched and Swindle and Deadend begin ripping through the streets of Rome causing general chaos and trying to draw the Autobots out. After an extended chase where Knockout proves he has what it takes, and Starscream challenges Prime to single combat inside Rome's Colosseum.

Prime and the Autobots enter the ancient structure, and Prime promptly falls through a trap door to a subway tunnel extension and into a strong set of restraints arranged by Carrera. Starscream then proceeds to attack the remaining Autobots while a helpless Prime is confronted by a vengeful Barricade. Before the Decepticon can dispatch Prime, the humans attack Barricade and Prime manages to work himself free. He easily defeats Barricade and returns to the surface where Starscream has fled.

On his way to whatever scheme he has come up next, Starscream takes the time to visit Carrera at this villa, where he pays him back for his “failure”. Finally, Epps and Lennox are relaxing on the beach back at Diego Garcia when Knockout approached and informs them that something significant is happening, mentioning how he is unfamiliar with the term “shanghaied”.

Transformers: The Veiled Threat has been called a lifeless read that is miserly in character development.

=== Aligned Continuity ===
Title	Author	Publisher	Date	Length	Plot	Ref.
Transformers: Exodus	Alex Irvine	Del Rey Books	June 22, 2010	276 pp		
Transformers: Exiles	Alex Irvine	Del Rey Books	October 4, 2011	357 pp		
Transformers: Retribution	David J. Williams and Mark S. Williams	Del Rey Books	January 28, 2014	391 pp		
Transformers: The Covenant of Primus	Justina Robson	47North	December 10, 2013	176 pp		
Transformers Robots in Disguise: Action and Adventure Collection	John Sazaklis and Steve Foxe	Little, Brown and Company	September 24, 2016	416 pp		

==== Transformers: Exodus ====
Transformers: Exodus - The Official History of the War for Cybertron
- Author: Alexander C. Irvine
- Language: English
- Genre: science fiction
- Published: June 22, 2010 Del Rey Books
- Publication place: United States
- Media type: Print (hardback & paperback)
- Pages: 276
- ISBN: 978-0-345-52252-8
- Followed by: Transformers: Exiles

Transformers: Exodus – The Official History of the War for Cybertron is a science fiction adventure novel by Alexander C. Irvine and the first installment of the History of the War for Cybertron book trilogy. It revolves around the origin of the war and experiences prior to it. It was believed to be a possible prequel to Transformers: Prime as noted in the book Transformers Vault and verified as such in the Transformers: Prime episode "One Shall Rise part 3", which references the entire book as part of a flashback into the way the war between the Autobots and Decepticons began. Exodus explores the backgrounds of Optimus Prime and Megatron within the Prime universe, showing how they came to be the leaders of their respective factions. The book also delves more heavily into the mythology of other well-known aspects of the Transformers characters and locations, such as Alpha Trion and The Fallen, whose original name is revealed in this story for the first time as Megatronus. It received two sequels, Transformers: Exiles and Transformers: Retribution, both chronicling the Autobots and Decepticons' subsequent voyage following the titular exodus of Cybertron, and various adventures before finally arriving on Earth.

It is implied that Transformers: Exodus, along with its two sequels, Exiles and Retribution are placed within the same continuity of the animated TV show Transformers: Prime and the video games Transformers: War for Cybertron, Transformers: Rise of the Dark Spark and Transformers: Fall of Cybertron. This is because many of the elements introduced in Transformers: Exodus are either directly referenced or match with events that occur in the TV series and games. This is primarily the revised backstory with Optimus Prime and Megatron, which is explained by Ratchet in the 3-part episode "One Shall Rise" in Transformers: Prime. It has been confirmed by Hasbro that the books, video games and TV series are all in the same continuity. However, many details are largely inconsistent between each work, specifically War for Cybertron and Exodus itself. While it is believed by many that War for Cybertron is a video game adaptation of Exodus and vice versa, due to the similarities. However, the plots of both the book and game highly differ from each other.

Pamela Luke of FantasyBookReview.co.uk called Transformers: Exodus an easy read with good writing.

==== Transformers: Exiles ====
Transformers: Exiles
- Author: Alexander C. Irvine
- Language: English
- Genre: science fiction
- Published: October 4, 2011 Del Rey Books
- Publication place: United States
- Media type: Print (paperback)
- Preceded by: Transformers: Exodus
- Followed by: Transformers: Retribution

Transformers: Exiles is the sequel to Transformers: Exodus, and exists in the Aligned Continuity.

Following their mass exodus from their home planet Cybertron, Optimus Prime and the Autobots are lost in deep space on board their spaceship, the Ark. The Matrix of Leadership projects a star map leading to Velocitron, one of the planets the Transformers colonized during Cybertron's golden age. When the Ark reaches Velocitron, Optimus Prime and a small group of other Autobots (including Jazz, Bumblebee, Silverbolt, and Perceptor) venture onto the planet's surface to investigate. They discover the planet is still inhabited by a population of Transformers, who have developed a culture centered on racing.

Travelling to the planet's capital city, Delta, the Autobots meet Velocitron's two rulers, Ransack and Override. The Velocitronians falsely assume the Autobots are their saviors, and Override explains their sun is reaching the end of its life and the planet is low on resources. The other Autobots land the Ark in Delta for repairs, and the Ark crew is invited to watch the Great Speedia race. Meanwhile, Ransack is approached by a shadowy figure named "777", who intrigues him by talking about Megatron and the Decepticons. Visiting the ruins of Velocitron's Space Bridge, Optimus communes with the Matrix of Leadership, which shows him a cryptic vision and leads him to a strange metal shard. Returning to Delta, he discusses the shard's significance with the other Autobots, and they discover a similar shard embedded within the Speedia winner's trophy. The Ark's repairs are mysteriously sabotaged, and Ransack and his followers try to wrest leadership from Override. As the Autobots leave in the Ark (taking two Velocitronians named Clocker and Mainspring with them), the Velocitronians begin a civil war.

Eventually, the Autobots find another planet, Junkion, which is made entirely out of garbage and scrap metal. The Transformers inhabiting Junkion are scavenging tribes led by the eccentric Wreck-Gar. The Junkions are friendly towards the Autobots and set to work fixing the Ark. Meanwhile, the Decepticons on board the Nemesis detect the Ark's signal and land on Velocitron in search of the Autobots. Ransack and several other Velocitronians pledge their allegiance to the Decepticons, but the Nemesis leaves shortly after arriving to continue tracking the Ark. The Matrix of Leadership projects another map leading to a working Space Bridge on Junkion, and Optimus makes plans to travel to it.

Prowl discovers the dead body of Shearbolt (a trader he spoke to earlier), but Ratchet determines Shearbolt died long before Prowl spoke to him, so they suspect there may be a Shifter (a Transformer able to transform into anything and anyone) hiding among the crew. Prowl interrogates Axer (a former Decepticon who became stranded on Junkion after a Space Bridge malfunction), and from the information given, Optimus and Jazz deduce that Hound is the Shifter. Sure enough, Hound is revealed to be 777 - whose true identity is the Decepticon spy Makeshift – and he is responsible for sabotaging the Ark's repairs on Velocitron. The Autobots and Junkions lure Makeshift into a trap, and he is imprisoned, though Makeshift mentions that the real Hound might still be alive on Cybertron.

On Cybertron, Alpha Trion and Wheeljack experiment with Space Bridge technology. They succeed in opening a Space Bridge to the Ark's current location, and an Autobot named Chaindrive is sent through. Optimus, Bumblebee, Jazz, and Silverbolt travel through the Junkion Space Bridge and find themselves on an asteroid, where they discover the tomb of Solus Prime, a deceased member of the original Thirteen Transformers. Chaindrive arrives and gives Optimus two more shards identical to the ones he found on Velocitron. Optimus realizes the shards are the Blades of Time, and after assembling them correctly, he contacts their owner Vector Prime (another member of the original Thirteen), who tells him the location of the Requiem Blaster, an ancient weapon with devastating power.

The Autobots return to Junkion, but Megatron and the Decepticons arrive and launch an assault. As the two sides battle, Axer escapes into the depths of Junkion and finds the Requiem Blaster, which is holding the planet together with its strong gravity. He tries to move it, but the gravitational disturbance starts to tear Junkion apart. Clocker, Mainspring, and Chaindrive, along with the Junkions Cannonspring and Pinion, reveal their true identity and combine into Nexus Prime, another member of the original Thirteen. Nexus gives Optimus a legendary sword called the Cyber Caliber, which he uses to duel with Megatron. Optimus wins the fight, but has a vision of the AllSpark's location and retreats to the Ark with the rest of the crew. The Autobots and Decepticons leave Junkion, and the search for the AllSpark continues.

==== Transformers: Retribution ====
Transformers: Retribution
- First edition
- Author: David J. Williams and Mark S. Williams
- Cover artist: John van Fleet
- Language: English
- Genre: science fiction
- Publisher: Del Rey Books
- Publication date: January 28, 2014
- Publication place: United States
- Preceded by: Transformers: Exiles

Transformers: Retribution is a science fiction adventure novel by David J. Williams and Mark S. Williams. It is the final installment of the History of the War for Cybertron trilogy, consisting of Exodus and Exiles. It differs in some respects from the previous installments in the trilogy, mostly in bringing the series closer to matching the established lore of Transformers: Prime.

Continuing their search for the AllSpark, the Autobots and Decepticons encounter the Quintessons. The Decepticons also have a brief battle with the Star Seekers, with the pirates using the Requiem Blaster against the Decepticon flagship Nemesis before being forced to jettison it. They then follow the Autobots to the planet Aquatron, a water planet that doesn't appear in any of their records, where they find an apparently peaceful race who trade in Energon and welcome the arrival of the Autobots. This is all a front, however, as the planet is secretly dominated by the Quintessons, who aim to destroy all the Cybertronians in revenge for the defeat they previously suffered at their hands.

Back on Cybertron, Alpha Trion is captured by Shockwave, who attempts to use him to access the supercomputer Vector Sigma so that he may create a Decepticon Matrix of Leadership. Unbeknownst to the Decepticon scientist, the Quintessons have created their own Matrix replica which they have been using to manipulate Optimus Prime and cause him to doubt himself as leader of the Autobots. Furthermore, the Quintessons are aware of Shockwave's efforts and are using him to help lay the groundwork for their invasion of Cybertron by reactivating a long dormant Space Bridge. Claiming to be a peaceful, benevolent race, they disable both the Nemesis and the Autobot Ark and bring both parties together for negotiation, but in reality seek only to capture and enslave them.

Megatron and Optimus find themselves working together against the Quintessons, with the other Autobots and Decepticons following suit. The Quintessons succeed in sending their Sharkticon army to Cybertron, but are unaware that Megatron is a figure of Sharkticon legend who is destined to free them from the Quintessons. He does so by taking possession of the Quintessons' replica Matrix (assuming the "Sharkticon Megatron" form depicted in the Transformers: Prime toyline). The invasion of Cybertron is thwarted, and the Quintesson hold over Aquatron-revealed to be a lost colony world of Cybertron-is broken, though Megatron loses the replica Matrix and his Sharkticon form. Alpha Trion is saved from Shockwave by the Wreckers, and concludes the book by noting the existence of a certain planet that is destined to play a major role in the struggle between Autobot and Decepticon.

==== Transformers: The Covenant of Primus ====
Transformers: The Covenant of Primus
- First edition
- Author: Justina Robson
- Language: English
- Genre: Fantasy novel
- Publisher: 47North
- Publication date: December 10, 2013
- Publication place: United States
- Pages: 176

Transformers: The Covenant of Primus is a companion novel to the Aligned Continuity. The term "Covenant of Primus" also describes an artifact featured in several continuities of the Transformers franchise, beginning with Beast Wars: Transformers, as well as an organization that was featured in storyline for the Botcon fan convention. The book is written from the perspective of the character Alpha Trion, and details the in-universe history of the planet Cybertron and its inhabitants, beginning with the Thirteen Primes.

In several Transformers series, the Covenant of Primus is an actual relic in the Transformers universe. This concept was first introduced in Beast Wars, where the Covenant is regarded as a sacred text by the Transformers. Several passages of it are quoted in the series finale Nemesis, and several are known to be modified Bible verses.

From 1998 to 2000 the annual Transformers fan convention Botcon had exclusive storyline that included a group of characters known as the Covenant of Primus. This group consisted of Twelve pre-Cybertronian Transformers based on the Zodiac and created by Primus as a last resort defense against the return of his nemesis, Unicron. Of their membership, only the following were named:

- Leonicus-the group's leader
- Aquator
- Libras
- Scorpius-a member of the Covenant who disappeared in order to infiltrate the ranks of Shokaract, the villain who served as Unicron's new host (represented by the Sandstorm Beast Wars figure)
- Capricun
- Piscor
- Ariex

The Covenant were created by Primus as part of an experiment that involved halting his universe-threatening battles with Unicron, and they were accelerated to the most advanced stage of Cybertronian life. Having succeeded in creating them, Primus tricked Unicron with a ruse that left them both trapped within planetoids, which they later reshaped into Cybertron and a mobile, planet-devouring vessel. The Covenant waited millennia for Unicron's return, and nearly engaged him during the events of The Transformers: The Movie until Rodimus Prime destroyed his body. Eventually, they traveled back in time to confront Shokaract on Earth during the time of the Beast Wars, where Unicron's displaced life force had landed after the destruction of his body. After losing several of their number, they realized that the key to defeating Unicron was to utilize their lifeforce, which was produced by Primus himself. Together with an army of Transformers of all factions from across time and space, they succeeded in defeating Shokaract, allowing Unicron's lifeforce to be drawn back into the time vortex from which it had emerged.

=== Short stories ===
Title	Author	Publisher	Date	Length	Plot	Ref.
Transformers Legends	Various	ibooks	November 30, 2004	296 pp	A collection of short stories based on Beast Wars, Generation 1, and Armada.	

== Ballantine Books ==
=== Find Your Fate Junior ===
A series of Choose Your Own Adventure-style books based on The Transformers.

==== Dinobots Strike Back ====
Dinobots Strike Back
- Author: Casey Todd
- Illustrator: William Schmidt
- Language: English
- Series: Transformers
- Genre: Science fiction
- Publisher: Ballantine Books
- Publication date: October 1985
- Media type: Print (Softcover)
- Pages: 73
- ISBN: 0-345-34150-3
- Followed by: Battle Drive

Book number 1 in the Transformers Find Your Fate Junior series. Dinobots Strike Back is a children's book. It was written by Casey Todd and illustrated by William Schmidt. It was published in 1985.

===== Synopsis =====
The Insecticons gain control of the minds of the Dinobots, hoping to turn their powers to evil.

===== Notes =====
- Other cast members include Bumblebee, Grimlock, Seaspray, Skids, Sludge, Swoop, Topspin, Bombshell and Frenzy.
- The cover features Frenzy taking aim at Bumblebee and Grimlock.
- In the book Skids is described as being red, despite being blue.
- Book has 12 possible endings.

==== Battle Drive ====
Battle Drive
- Author: Barbara Siegel and Scott Siegel
- Illustrator: William Schmidt
- Language: English
- Series: Transformers
- Genre: Science fiction
- Publisher: Ballantine Books
- Publication date: December 1985
- Media type: Print (Softcover)
- Pages: 73
- ISBN: 0-345-34153-8
- Preceded by: Dinobots Strike Back
- Followed by: Attack of the Insecticons

Book number 2 in the Find Your Fate Junior series.

Written by Barbara Siegel and Scott Siegel. Illustrated by William Schmidt. The cover art features Jazz, Starscream and Optimus Prime. Characters in the story include Buster and Sparkplug Witwicky, Soundwave and Ransack. This book has 12 different endings. ISBN 0-345-34153-8

==== Attack of the Insecticons ====
- Written by Lynn Beach
- Illustrated by William Schmidt
- ISBN 0-345-34151-1

==== Earthquake ====
- Written by Ann Matthews
- Illustrated by William Schmidt
- ISBN 0-345-33071-4

==== Desert Flight ====
- Written by Jim Razzi
- Illustrated by William Schmidt
- ISBN 0-345-33072-2

==== Decepticon Poison ====
- Cover illustration of Bumblebee, Megatron and Dreadwing.
- Cast includes Blurr.
- Written by Judith Bauer Stamper
- Illustrated by William Schmidt

==== Autobot Alert! ====
- Written by Judith Bauer Stamper
- Illustrated by William Schmidt
- ISBN 0-345-33388-8

Notes: Starting in this book and going the rest of the series, Galvatron and Ultra Magnus are depicted as the leaders with transformers from the 3rd Season and The Movie showing up. Oddly enough the Transformers who die in the movie still show up.

==== Project Brain Drain ====
Project Brain Drain
- Author: Barbara Siegel and Scott Siegel
- Illustrator: William Schmidt
- Language: English
- Series: Transformers
- Genre: Science fiction
- Publisher: Ballantine Books
- Media type: Print (Softcover)
- Pages: 72
- ISBN: 0-345-33389-6

- Written by Barbara Siegel and Scott Siegel
- Illustrated by William Schmidt
- ISBN 0-345-33389-6

Wreck-Gar appears.

Notes: Bumblebee sacrifices himself in one of the endings, thus he's not seen in the following book. Spike is depicted as Sparkplug's son as opposed to Buster, who showed up earlier in the series.

==== The Invisibility Factor ====
The Invisibility Factor
- Author: Josepha Sherman
- Illustrator: William Schmidt
- Language: English
- Series: Transformers
- Genre: Science fiction
- Publisher: Ballantine Books
- Publication date: August 12th, 1986
- Media type: Print (Softcover)
- Pages: 72
- ISBN: 0-345-33391-8

The 9th and last book in the Transformers Find Your Fate Junior series. The Invisibility Factor is a children's book. It was written by Josepha Sherman and illustrated by William Schmidt. It was published in 1986.

===== Synopsis =====
The reader's decisions will determine whether the Autobots or Decepticons gain control of an Earth scientist's invisibility device.

===== Notes =====
- Cast includes Autbots Hot Rod, Kup, Metroplex, Springer, Prowl, Ultra Magnus, Jazz, Sunstreaker, Ratchet and Red Alert. Decepticons include Scavenger, Starscream, Galvatron, Thrust, Ravage, Bombshell, Shockwave, Laserbeak, Frenzy and Dirge.
- Ravage and Laserbeak speak in this book.
- The ship on the cover looks exactly like the Millennium Falcon.

== Fun Publications ==
=== Force of Habit ===
Force of Habit
- Author: Greg Sepelak and S. Trent Troop
- Language: English
- Series: Transformers
- Genre: Science fiction
- Publisher: Fun Publications
- Publication date: 2008
- Media type: Electronic

A 2008 Transformers: Cybertron story by Greg Sepelak and S. Trent Troop.

==== Synopsis ====
Set during the events of the Transformers: Cybertron television series, Ultra Magnus is commander of various Autobot ships sent to other planets in search for the Cyber Planet Keys. Longrack serves as captain of the Spanner which was sent to Delta Draconis. Among the ship's crew are Armorhide, Blurr and Checkpoint.

=== The New World ===
The New World
- Author: Greg Sepelak and S. Trent Troop
- Language: English
- Series: Transformers
- Genre: Science fiction
- Publisher: Fun Publications
- Publication date: 2007
- Media type: Electronic

A 2007 Transformers Classicverse story by Greg Sepelak and S. Trent Troop.

==== Synopsis ====
Set on the planet Cybertron after the events of the last issue of the original Marvel Transformers comic series, Mini-Cons created by the Last Autobot are restoring Cybertron for the return of their larger Autobot and Decepticon brothers who are in space. A conspiracy led by Broadside (Transformers) attempts to close of Cybertron for the Mini-Cons.

==== Notes ====
Other character appearing include Modus Prime and Knockdown.

== HarperCollins ==
=== Satellite Meltdown ===
Satellite Meltdown is a 2010 children's book written by Lucy Rosen and published by HarperCollins. It has 24 pages. ISBN 978-0-06-199179-0

=== Transformers: Meet the Decepticons ===
Meet the Decepticons is a 2007 children's book written by Jennifer Frantz and illustrated by Guido Guidi. It has 32 pages ISBN 978-0-06-088828-2

== IDW Publishing ==
=== Transformers: The Ark – A Complete Compendium Of Transformers Animation Models ===
Transformers: The Ark – A Complete Compendium Of Transformers Animation Models
- Author: Jim Sorenson, Bill Forster & Bob Budiansky
- Cover artist: Don Figueroa
- Language: English
- Series: Transformers
- Genre: Science fiction
- Publisher: IDW Publishing
- Publication date: May 31st, 2007
- Pages: 208
- ISBN: 978-1-60010-080-2

The Ark is a compendium of Transformers animation models, released by IDW Publishing on 5/31/2007. Jim Sorenson and Bill Forster authored the volume. It is a 208-page trade paperback, ISBN 978-1-60010-080-2. The cover was drawn by Don Figueroa and the foreword written by Bob Budiansky.

The Ark contains the original animation models, robot and alt mode, for every character with a toy who appeared in the four seasons of the original Transformers cartoon, which ran from 1984-1987. Most of the characters are shown with multiple angles. Some feature head shots, transformation storyboards or close-ups of their weapons.

In addition to the toy based characters, a few characters unique to the cartoon also appear in these pages, including Autobot X, Devcon and Alpha Trion. Humans such as Spike, Chip Chase and Dr. Arkeville appear, as does a one-page mosaic of the planet Cybertron. Ships included are most of the ships from the original animated movie, as well as The Ark and The Nemesis. Unicron, the Junkions, the Lithones and the Quintessons each receive 2 to 4 pages of models. A three-page spread details the pre-earth modes of Soundwave, Jazz, Bumblebee, Laserbeak, Wheeljack and the Seekers.

In the back is a bonus section. Included are alternate model sheets for Jetfire, Megatron, some Stunticons, the Combaticons, some characters from the movie, some season 3 beast Decepticons and Broadside. Also present is a two-page sheet of the faction sigil from multiple angles and scale guide with most season 1 and season 2 characters represented.

Organization is chronological by faction. An index in the back gives page reference for each character in the book.

=== Transformers: Robots in Disguise: A New Mission ===
A comic created from screenshots from the Robots in Disguise animated series.

== Kid Stuff ==
=== Battle for Cybertron ===
Battle for Cybertron
- Author: Scott Siegel
- Illustrator: Earl Norem
- Language: English
- Series: Transformers
- Genre: Science fiction
- Publisher: Kid Stuff Records & Tapes
- Publication date: September 1984
- Media type: Print (Softcover)
- Pages: 35
- ISBN: 0-87135-016-5
- Followed by: The Great Car Rally

Battle for Cybertron is a book and audio story. It was published in 1984.

==== Synopsis ====
The origin of the Autobots and Decepticons arrival on Earth.

==== Notes ====
- The Ark is mentioned by name as the Autobot ship's computer.
- The cover illustration has Optimus Prime riding the surface of the Ark in space, as the Autobots are followed by the Nemesis.
- According to the illustrator Earl Norem, he was chosen for the job because of the expressive way he could draw Conan and super heroes. Optimus Prime was depicted with a visible mouth, instead of having a face plate him. This was done to help depict emotion.

=== Satellite of Doom ===
Satellite of Doom
- Author: John Braden
- Language: English
- Series: Transformers
- Genre: Science fiction
- Publisher: Kid Stuff Records & Tapes
- Publication date: August 1985
- Media type: Print (Softcover)
- Pages: 32
- ISBN: 5-551-36038-5
- Preceded by: The Great Car Rally
- Followed by: When Continents Collide

Satellite of Doom is a book and audio story. It was published in 1985.

==== Synopsis ====
In the 1985 audio and book adventure Satellite of Doom Megatron and Soundwave kidnap thousands of humans and force them to bury tons of coal in the desert. Sealing the humans in the cave they set off high temperature explosives that turn the carbon in the coal and humans into a gigantic diamond lens that they plan to launch into space. Bumblebee discovers the Decepticon launching site and Optimus Prime sends Skyfire to take it out, but he fails. Megatron launches the lens into space and uses it to focus the sun's rays and melt the shale in the Rocky Mountains into oil. Optimus again sends Skyfire to stop the lens and Prowl instructs Ratchet to build extra fuel tanks for the Autobot jet's trip to space. Despite his best efforts the diamond is unharmed and Skyfire burns up on reentry of Earth's atmosphere. As the boiling oil threatens to kill millions on the West Coast, the Autobots build a mile long mirror to reflect the lens rays back on it, shattering it. The Autobots launch an assault on Megatron's base, but the Decepticon leader and Soundwave escape in their drilling mole machine.

==== Notes ====
- During this adventure Jetfire is known by his animated series name Skyfire. He is also depicted in his animated series form, not that of his toy.
- During this story Skyfire is killed.

=== Jaws of Terror ===
Jaws of Terror
- Author: John Braden
- Illustrator: Pablo Marcos and Judith Marcos
- Language: English
- Series: Transformers
- Genre: Science fiction
- Publisher: Kid Stuff Records & Tapes
- Publication date: 1986
- Media type: Print (Softcover)
- Pages: 24
- ISBN: 0-87660-183-2
- Preceded by: Storms of Destruction
- Followed by: Slaves of the Insecticons

Jaws of Terror is a book and audio story. It was published in 1986.

==== Synopsis ====
Megatron attacks an Autobot base with his new weapon: The Crusher!

==== Notes ====
Characters appearing in this book include Megatron, Optimus Prime, Prowl, Ramjet, Slag and Soundwave.

- There are hundreds of Dinobots.

== Ladybird Books ==
=== Autobots' Lightning Strike ===
Autobots' Lightning Strike
- Author: John Grant
- Illustrator: Mike Collins and Mark Farmer
- Language: English
- Series: Transformers
- Genre: Science fiction
- Publisher: Ladybird Books
- Publication date: April 1, 1985
- Media type: Print (Hardcover)
- Pages: 48
- ISBN: 0-7214-0895-8
- Followed by: Megatron's Fight for Power

Autobots' Lightning Strike is a children's book and companion audio cassette. It was written by John Grant and illustrated by Mike Collins and Mark Farmer. It was published in 1985.

==== Synopsis ====
The Autobots are amazed by the power of a thunderstorm and Optimus Prime orders Huffer to build a collector to store the energy given off by the next storm. Laserbeak discovers the lightning rod and informs the Decepticons, but Soundwave mistakes it for a giant transmission antenna. Although Starscream and Rumble attempt to destroy the object, Megatron stops them and leads the Decepticons to the object in hopes of learning what message the Autobots are sending, and who they are contacting. Once inside the base, the Decepticons are caught in the energy of a storm and are forced to retreat. The Autobot plan to use the energy to help them repair their ship and eventually return to Cybertron, leaving humanity with the technology to collect energy from lightning.

==== Notes ====
- Characters appearing in this story include Bluestreak, Gears, Hound, Huffer, Jazz, Laserbeak, Megatron, Mirage, Optimus Prime, Ratchet, Ravage, Rumble, Sideswipe, Soundwave, Sparkplug Witwicky, Spike Witwicky, Starscream and Sunstreaker.
- Ravage is referred to as a mechanical hound, not a jaguar.
- Spike was noted to be a young engineering student in this story.
- Rumble was depicted in toy-accurate red and black colors.
- Optimus Prime's laser rifle is depicted as being gold in color compared to its usual black or dark blue.

=== Megatron's Fight For Power ===
Megatron's Fight For Power
- Author: John Grant
- Illustrator: Mike Collins and Mark Farmer
- Language: English
- Series: Transformers
- Genre: Science fiction
- Publisher: Ladybird Books
- Publication date: January 31, 1985
- Media type: Print (Hardcover)
- Pages: 48
- ISBN: 0-7214-0896-6
- Preceded by: Autobots' Lightning Strike
- Followed by: Autobots Fight Back

Megatron's Fight For Power is a children's book and companion audio cassette. It was written by John Grant and illustrated by Mike Collins and Mark Farmer. It was published in 1985.

==== Synopsis ====
Whilst on a routine recon mission, Laserbeak detects a solar power research station. The Deceptions attack the station, siphoning the power to fill their energon cubes. Starscream makes an unsuccessful attempt to oust Megatron as leader. The Autobots arrive and battle ensues. The Decepticons are defeated when Spike sabotages the solar collector, destroying the energon cubes.

==== Notes ====
- Cast includes Buzzsaw, Gears, Hound, Huffer, Ironhide, Laserbeak, Megatron, Mirage, Optimus Prime, Rumble, Soundwave, Sparkplug Witwicky, Spike Witwicky and Starscream.

=== Autobots Fight Back ===
Autobots Fight Back
- Author: John Grant
- Illustrator: Mike Collins and Mark Farmer
- Language: English
- Series: Transformers
- Genre: Science fiction
- Publisher: Ladybird Books
- Publication date: 1985
- Media type: Print (Hardcover)
- Pages: 48
- ISBN: 0-7214-0942-3
- Preceded by: Megatron's Fight For Power
- Followed by: Laserbeak's Fury

Autobots Fight Back is a children's book with companion audio cassette (as with the other titles in the series, the book was also available separately). It was written by John Grant, illustrated by Mike Collins and Mark Farmer and published in 1985.

==== Synopsis ====
Optimus Prime sends Bumblebee to spy on the Deceptions. He overhears Megatron and the other senior Deceptions discussing the fact they need space to test their ship's new ion-drive. Bumblebee is chased from the area by Ravage, ironically leading him to an abandoned railway tunnel that exactly suits the Decepticons' purposes. The Autobots manage to locate the Decepticons' position by monitoring their radio waves and Spike suggests they take advantage of a car rally being held nearby. Spike and Jazz enter the rally and manage to slip away and locate the Decepticons. As the Autobots launch an attack, Spike and Jazz send an old wagon train crashing through the tunnel, destroying the Decepticons' ion drive.

==== Notes ====
- Other Transformers featured in the story include Soundwave, Starscream, Hound, Trailbreaker, Ironhide and Ratchet.
- Spike makes a comment that suggests he and his father live with the Autobots: he notes that unlike Autobots they need to eat and they seem to rely on them for transport.
- This was the last of the original three books released and ends with Optimus Prime and Spike debating whether or not the Decepticons survived the destruction of the tunnel. However, a fourth title would soon follow.

=== Laserbeak's Fury ===
Laserbeak's Fury
- Author: John Grant
- Illustrator: Mike Collins and Mark Farmer
- Language: English
- Series: Transformers
- Genre: Science fiction
- Publisher: Ladybird Books
- Publication date: January 30, 1986
- Media type: Print (Hardcover)
- Pages: 48
- ISBN: 0-7214-0943-1
- OCLC: 406890877
- Preceded by: Autobots Fight Back
- Followed by: Galvatron's Air Attack

Laserbeak's Fury is a children's book and companion audio cassette. It was published 1986.

==== Synopsis ====
Megatron had Soundwave send Laserbeak to learn more about the humans, despite Starscream's protests that humans were weak and insignificant. Observing a windmill, Laserbeak came into contact with power lines, became trapped in cassette form and was found by some humans. Both the Decepticons and Autobots monitored Laserbeak's radio report. Hound and Spike were sent to investigate. When they discovered the Decepticons observing the windmill, they called for backup. Optimus Prime assembled a battle unit of Ironhide, Sunstreaker, Windcharger and Cliffjumper, leaving Ratchet in charge of their headquarters. Meanwhile, Laserbeak was taken to a disco, where playing him re-energized his circuits and he flew off to rejoin the Decepticons. Sparkplug explained to the Autobots the windmill's technology, as Megatron was interested in a mechanical device that didn't generate a magnetic field. A battle broke out over the windmill, in which Starscream panicked when he learned the windmill was immune to his null rays. Rumble destroyed the windmill during the battle and the Decepticons retreated, with no new technology to take. Optimus Prime expressed his regrets over the destruction that occurred. However, Spike points out that no-one had any idea about the battle as the local paper reported that a freak storm had destroyed the windmill, while Laserbeak's appearance at the disco was described as a "winged demon" by those present.

==== Notes ====
- In this story's accompanying book Cliffjumper was depicted in his yellow variant, not his usual red one.

=== Galvatron's Air Attack ===
Galvatron's Air Attack
- Author: John Grant
- Illustrator: Richard Dunn
- Language: English
- Series: Transformers
- Genre: Science fiction
- Publisher: Ladybird Books
- Publication date: January 30, 1986
- Media type: Print (Hardcover)
- Pages: 48
- ISBN: 0-7214-0988-1
- Preceded by: Laserbeak's Fury
- Followed by: Decepticon Hideout

Galvatron's Air Attack is a children's book with optional companion audio cassette. It was published in 1986.

==== Synopsis ====
With the Autobots running low on supplies of the Cybertronian metals they need for repairs, Kup suggests visiting the scene of an old battle between them and the Deceptions to see if anything was left behind. However the search is halted by an ambush by the Decepticon planes. Worried about how Galvatron knew where they were, Ultra Magnus sends out first the Aerialbots then Cosmos, discovering the Decepticons have three shielded satellites which can monitor the whole of the Earth's surface. The Autobots use artificial Northern lights to cut out communications then send a fake message that causes the three satellites, unable to see each other, to collide, destroying them. The Autobots then salvage the metals they need from the wreckage.

==== Notes ====
- For the second series of two books, an extra paragraph was added to the prologue explaining how Galvatron had travelled back from the 21st century to take over from Megatron as Decepticon commander and following the "strange disappearance" of Optimus Prime Ultra Magnus had arrived from Cybertron as the Autobots' new leader. This does not match any scenario in the comic or animated series continuities.
- In addition to the "New Leaders", these books brought in several of the other newer characters such as the Special Teams.
- Blitzwing is referred to as commanding one of the Decepticon stations. There is nothing to indicate he survived its destruction.
- Other Transformers featured in the novel are Starscream, Soundwave, Thrust, Dirge, Cyclonus, Scourge, Hot Rod, Ratchet, Wheeljack, Grapple, Hoist, Huffer and Swerve.
- One of the illustrations depicts Ramjet flying alongside Starscream, Thrust and Dirge. Since the accompanying text refers to the Aerialbots, this is probably a mistake.

=== Decepticon Hideout ===
Decepticon Hideout
- Author: John Grant
- Illustrator: Graham Potts
- Language: English
- Series: Transformers
- Genre: Science fiction
- Publisher: Ladybird Books
- Publication date: 1986
- Media type: Print (Hardcover)
- Pages: 48
- ISBN: 0-7214-0989-X

Decepticon Hideout is a children's book with optional companion audio cassette. It was written by John Grant and illustrated by Graham Potts. It was published in 1986.

==== Synopsis ====
The Decepticons launch a surprise attack on the Autobot base, leading the Autobots to realise they have established a base close by. Bumblebee follows a Decepticon recovery crew to an abandoned warehouse on a nearby industrial estate. At the suggestion of Spike's father, the Autobots take up position in a neighbouring building then, when the estate is closed for holidays, launch an attack on the Decepticons. Ultra Magnus and Galvatron end up in single combat and when Galvatron appears triumphant Spike strikes him with a wrecking ball before bringing a wall down on the Decepticons, causing them to retreat.

==== Notes ====
- Other Transformers featured in the story include Hot Rod, Mirage, Hound, Huffer, Onslaught, Brawl, Swindle and Grapple.
- As in Laserbeak's Fury, it is stated the Autobots have a rule that the property of Earth people must not be harmed, hence they rebuild the damage done to the industrial estate before the humans return.

=== Decepticons at the Pole ===
Decepticons at the Pole
- Author: John Grant
- Illustrator: Barry Rowell
- Language: English
- Series: Transformers
- Genre: Science fiction
- Publisher: Ladybird Books
- Publication date: January 28th, 1988
- Media type: Print (Hardcover)
- Pages: 48
- ISBN: 0-7214-1068-5
- Preceded by: Decepticon Hideout
- Followed by: Autobots Strike Oil

Decepticons at the Pole is a children's book with optional companion audio cassette. It was written by John Grant and illustrated by Barry Rowell. It was published in 1988.

==== Synopsis ====
Seeking a new energy source, the Decepticons decide, on the advice of their Nebulan partners, to build an energy converter at the pole and harness cosmic energy via Nebulos' magnetic field. The Autobots discover the plan and realise that interfering with the energy flow will doom the planet. When Cyclonus refuses to listen to reason, they launch an attack and destroy the energy pyramid. The Decepticons then make a second attempt, by moving Scorponok and the entire Decepticon force to the pole and then establishing a more complex energy converter. The Autobots launch an attack during which Kup, Blurr and Sureshot manage to melt the permafrost under the converter and collapse it.

==== Notes ====
- Another new prologue is added, referring to the Transformers relocating to Nebulos. The books now focus solely on the Headmaster and Targetmaster characters.
- In this book and the subsequent one, the Autobots are shown to be led by Hot Rod and the Decepticons by Cyclonus. Again this seems to place them firmly outside either TV or comic continuity.
- Other Transformers featured in the book include Brainstorm, Highbrow, Crosshairs, Hardhead, Scourge, Apeface, Skullcruncher, Triggerhappy and Slugslinger. Misfire is also mentioned.
- Nebulans mentioned include Vorath, Arcana and Aimless. Curiously, Hot Rod's partner is referred to as Sparks, as in the Marvel comics, as opposed to Firebolt as in the toy line.
- Scorponok is here portrayed as simply a transforming Decepticon base (base to scorpion and back again) of limited intelligence, with no mention of his robot mode.

=== Autobots Strike Oil ===
Autobots Strike Oil
- Author: John Grant
- Illustrator: Barry Rowell
- Language: English
- Series: Transformers
- Genre: Science fiction
- Publisher: Ladybird Books
- Publication date: 1988
- Media type: Print (Hardcover)
- Pages: 48
- ISBN: 0-7214-1069-3
- Preceded by: Decepticons at the Pole
- Followed by: Decepticons Underground

Autobots Strike Oil is a children's book with optional companion audio cassette. It was written by John Grant and illustrated by Barry Rowell. It was published in 1988.

==== Synopsis ====
The Autobots are running low on oil so Hot Rod sends Chromedome and Hardhead to investigate a Nebulan legend about underground oil reserves. The pair locate an oil lake, unaware they are being observed by Weirdwolf. Under Brainstorm's direction, the Autobots construct a pipeline between the lake and their base. Cyclonus and the Decepticons attack and damage the pipe. Kup and Highbrow repair the pipe, better concealing it in the process, but come under attack from the Decepticons. However, they manage to defeat them by luring them into the gulley full of spilt oil, causing them to lose their footing.

==== Notes ====
- Other Transformers featured include Scourge, Crosshairs, Apeface, Snapdragon, Triggerhappy and Slugslinger.
- Nebulans mentioned include Recoil, Stylor, Duros and Monzo.

=== Decepticons Underground ===
Decepticons Underground
- Author: John Grant
- Illustrator: Glenn Stewart
- Language: English
- Series: Transformers
- Genre: Science fiction
- Publisher: Ladybird Books
- Publication date: January 28th, 1988
- Media type: Print (Hardcover)
- Pages: 48
- ISBN: 0-7214-1119-3
- Preceded by: Autobots Strike Oil
- Followed by: Autobot Hostage

Decepticons Underground is a children's book with optional companion audio cassette. It was written by John Grant and illustrated by Glenn Stewart. It was published in 1988.

==== Synopsis ====
Nothing has been heard of the Decepticons for some time so Optimus Prime sends out patrols to find out what they are doing. Soon all of Nebulos has been searched except the Nebulos Triangle, an area of electronic interference. A patrol comprising Quickswitch, Scoop and Quickmix is sent to the area and, after encountering difficulties with navigation and a whirlpool, they uncover an underground Decepticon base. After a chase through the tunnels, Scoop manages to block off the base's surface exit and Quickmix finishes the job by coating the rocks with rapid-set concrete.

==== Notes ====
- In this book and the following one, the Autobots are led by the Powermaster Optimus Prime.
- Other newer characters, such as the new Headmaster and double Targetmasters, were introduced.
- Other Autobots featured in the book include Kup, Highbrow and Brainstorm. Among those depicted in the illustrations appear to be Hosehead as well as Grapple and Hoist, neither of whom is usually depicted amongst the Transformers on Nebulos.
- No Decepticons are named in the text but the illustrations feature Fangry, Horri-Bull and Squeezeplay.

=== Autobot Hostage ===
Autobot Hostage
- Author: John Grant
- Illustrator: Glenn Stewart
- Language: English
- Series: Transformers
- Genre: Science fiction
- Publisher: Ladybird Books
- Publication date: 1988
- Media type: Print (Hardcover)
- Pages: 48
- ISBN: 0-7214-1118-5
- Preceded by: Decepticons Underground

Autobot Hostage is a children's book with optional companion audio cassette. It was written by John Grant and illustrated by Glenn Steward. It was published in 1988.

==== Synopsis ====
While on solo patrol, Highbrow is captured by the Decepticon Tentakil. Scorponok sends a message to the Autobots promising to release him if Optimus Prime gives himself up. Optimus Prime surrenders but also smuggles Hosehead and Fizzle into the Decepticon base. As expected, Scorponok fails to keep his side of the bargain but the two Autobots manage to free both Optimus Prime and Highbrow and after a brief battle they make their escape.

==== Notes ====
- The Decepticons are now shown to be led by Scorponok, who is portrayed closer to his cartoon and comic counterparts.
- Other Transformers featured in the story include Kup, Spinister and Cindersaur. The only Nebulan referred to by name is Cambo, who is Hosehead's partner.
- Although called Fizzle in the text, and having the character of Sparkabot Fizzle, all the illustrations of Fizzle are mistakenly drawn as another Sparkabot, Sizzle.
- Although unnamed in the text, the two Decepticons who capture Optimus Prime are depicted in the illustrations as Dreadwind and Darkwing. Other illustrations feature the Autobots Scoop and Quickswitch.

== Marvel Books ==
=== Battle for Earth ===
Battle for Earth
- Author: Max Z. Baum
- Illustrator: Brad Joyce and Roberta Edelman
- Language: English
- Series: Transformers
- Genre: Science fiction
- Publisher: Marvel Books
- Publication date: June 1985
- Media type: Print (Softcover)
- Pages: 45
- ISBN: 0-87135-062-9

Battle for Earth is a children's book by Max Z. Baum published by Marvel Books in 1985. 44 pages. ISBN 0-87135-062-9

==== Synopsis ====
After the Decepticon robots take millions of people hostage in an attempt to conquer the Earth, the Autobot robots come to the rescue.

==== Notes ====
Shockwave is on the cover, but does not appear in the story.

=== The Invasion of the Decepticon Camp ===
The Invasion of the Decepticon Camp
- Author: Pat Brigandi
- Illustrator: Steve Ditko and Brad Joyce
- Language: English
- Series: Transformers
- Genre: Science fiction
- Publisher: Marvel Books
- Publication date: 1986
- Media type: Print (Softcover)
- Pages: 48
- ISBN: 0-87135-102-1

The Invasion of the Decepticon Camp is a story and a coloring book published by Marvel Books in 1986. It is written by Pat Brigandi and illustrated by award-winning artist Steve Ditko and Brad Joyce.

==== Synopsis ====
Blurr beats Jazz in a race as Ratchet, Bumblebee and Springer watch. They are spied on by Scourge, Laserbeak and Bombshell. Hot Rod challenges Blurr to another race, but crashes when he thinks he spots a Decepticon. As Springer goes to help Hot Rod, Bombshell injects him with a cerebro shell. Grapple recovers Hot Rod and takes him back to Ratchet to be repaired. Back at the Autobot headquarters Wreck-Gar notices that Springer is acting funny, leading to an uneasy confrontation.

==== Notes ====
Ultra Magnus and Galvatron are the leaders of the Autobots and Decepticons, both operate from bases on Earth. Bombshell and Cyclonus appear at the same time, ignoring the two being the same person in the 1986 Transformers movie. Wreck-Gar is portrayed as another Autobot on Earth, not from the planet of Junk as he is usually portrayed.

=== The Lost Treasure of Cybertron ===
The Lost Treasure of Cybertron
- Author: Sonya Black Woods
- Illustrator: Frank Springer and Phil Lord
- Language: English
- Series: Transformers
- Genre: Science fiction
- Publisher: Marvel Books
- Publication date: 1986
- Media type: Print (Softcover)
- Pages: 48
- ISBN: 0-87135-103-X
- Preceded by: Battle at Oil Valley
- Followed by: Hot Rod's Escape

The Lost Treasure of Cybertron is a story and coloring book published by Marvel Books in 1986. It is written by Sonya Black Woods and illustrated by Frank Springer and Phil Lord.

==== Synopsis ====
While out on a leisurely drive, the Autobots and Daniel stop to rest and eat. While relaxing, Kup tells them the story of the lost treasure of Cybertron - a supply of energon cubes which were loaded on the Ark before it left Cybertron. A supply which was lost in the crash. Hot Rod decides they should try to find the energon, and the other Autobots agree. Laserbeak, who has been spying on the Autobots, flies home to let Galvatron know about the cubes. Ultra Magnus leads the Autobots Arcee, Blurr, Brawn, Bumblebee, Grimlock, Hot Rod, Kup, Sideswipe, Sludge, Springer, Sunstreaker, Swoop, Wheelie and Windcharger to Mt. St. Hilary. Meanwhile, Galvatron leads the Decepticons Bonecrusher, Dirge, Laserbeak, Ramjet, Rumble, Scrapper, Scourge, Soundwave and Starscream to the other side of the mountain. They discover each other and fighting ensues. During the fight, Rumble accidentally unearths the crate containing the energon. During the struggle the crate is broken open by Grimlock and then Starscream shoves most of the energon into his mouth, and declares himself leader of the Decepticons. He fights with Galvatron, and the Autobots leave.

==== Notes ====
- This book is clearly written by people who have not seen the Transformers movie yet, but had models and notes about the characters. It features several characters who seemingly died in the movie working alongside ones created in the movie later. In this book, Daniel's father seems to be Buster Witwicky from the comics, not Spike.
- In this book Galvatron's starship is called "Cyclonus", but appears to be a giant version of Scourge's vehicle mode. Oddly, Scourge is among the Decepticon troops inside the ship. Cyclonus himself does not appear in the story.
- Rumble, who is illustrated on the cover, follows his toy-accurate colors of red and black, not his colors from the animated series.
- Autobot City, as illustrated in this book, appears as a futuristic space city, looking nothing like Autobot City from the movie.
- Frank Springer, one of the illustrators credited for this book, was also a regular artist for the Marvel Comics Transformers series.

=== Car Show Blow Up ===
Car Show Blow Up is "a big looker storybook" published by Marvel Books in 1986. It is written by Dana Rosenfeld and illustrated by Earl Norem. ISBN 0-87135-107-2.
