= Daredevil Noir =

Comic book limited series by Marvel Comics

Publication information
- Publisher: Marvel Comics
- Schedule: Monthly
- Format: Limited series
- Genre: Noir fiction; Superhero
- Publication date: April 8, 2009 — July 1, 2009
- No. of issues: 4
- Main character(s): Daredevil; Foggy Nelson; Bullseye Killer; Kingpin

Creative team
- Written by: Alex Irvine
- Artist: Tomm Coker

Daredevil Noir is a four-issue comic book limited series published by Marvel Comics. The series, written by Alex Irvine and illustrated by Tomm Coker, was published from April 8 to July 1, 2009, as part of the Marvel Noir imprint.

== Plot ==
One night, Daredevil infiltrates a building where the Kingpin is expecting him. The two confront each other and discuss what has happened in the past week involving Orville Halloran. In his childhood, Matt Murdock was blinded by his father's assassin who brutally slammed his head into a brick wall, leaving him blind. Though he did wish to become a lawyer, his impoverished lifestyle denied it, leaving him to be a performer instead, under the name Daredevil. Later he took to the streets as a vigilante, killing criminals to avenge those they killed. Matt now works with Foggy Nelson and was in his office until one afternoon a woman named Eliza entered the room and offered a way to bring down Halloran. When she left the office, Foggy has doubts and turns to Matt, but Matt convinced him that she is telling the truth and left the office to investigate. Meanwhile, Fisk is with Halloran in a restaurant discussing the identity of Daredevil being Jack Murdock's son.

However, one night, a police officer sees three cars, two being police cars and one being the gangster's car, and witnesses five men being killed by the Bullseye Killer and believe that he is one of Halloran's men. Back in the office, both Foggy and Matt discuss Halloran making his move against Fisk, and Matt worries that Eliza will be caught in the middle of it. When Foggy said that Eliza mentioned Halloran putting money on Matt's father throwing the fight on the night he was killed, Matt left the office to find out. Matt went to a bar called Dilooly and met with Eliza there to confirm what Eliza said to Foggy was true about his father, which she did confirm and told Matt not to do anything that would get him killed. When Matt was walking on the street he heard a woman scream, which he quickly dressed up in his Daredevil uniform and apprehended the assailant, however it was revealed to be a setup by Wilson Fisk who wanted to meet him and revealed that Halloran was the one who killed his father.

The next night, Matt followed Eliza around the city to look over her, but suddenly a fight broke out in the "Landmark Inn" where a bartender revealed that the Bullseye Killer was here before dying. With no sign of Eliza and Hell's Kitchen being threatened, Matt went throughout the city to find the whereabouts of Halloran from his men. He went back to Foggy's office to reveal that he knows where Halloran is and plans to get Eliza back, but Foggy has doubts about if Matt ever had her. Matt went to the harbor and found Halloran there, who was expecting him to arrive. Matt figured out that Halloran killed his father and told Fisk, who then told him about it, which would lead Matt coming to him. However, what shocked him is that Eliza was there, who was surprised that she can lie to him, but what surprised Matt is that Halloran revealed that Eliza is the Bullseye Killer. Surprised by the news, Matt figured out that she is one of Fisk's employers, which Halloran refused to believe until Eliza killed him.

With Halloran dead and Eliza killing the rest of Halloran's men, the two fought constantly, with Eliza gaining the upper hand, but Matt eagerly charged into her, but both landed into the sea. This made Eliza unable to throw well, which gave Matt an advantage as he began to strangle her to death with a chain and Eliza trying to fight back until she was unconscious, but Matt could not finish her off because he still loved her and dragged her back to the surface. The Police arrived and Matt left, leaving Eliza in police custody. Matt returned to Foggy's office and revealed to him that Eliza was the Bullseye Killer, which surprised him, but also revealed that he could not kill her because he still has feelings for her. Foggy comforts him until Matt decides to go after Fisk. Returning to the present, Matt and Fisk end their discussion and the series ends with the two beginning to fight each other.

== Publication history ==
The four-issue comic book limited series Daredevil Noir, written by Alex Irvine and illustrated by Tomm Coker, was published by Marvel Comics from April 8 to July 1, 2009, as part of the Marvel Noir imprint. Daredevil Noir later appeared in Spider-Verse Unlimited #41–43 (March 2023).

=== Issues ===
Issue	Title	Publication date	Ref.
#1	"Liar's Poker"	April 8, 2009	
#2	"Liar's Poker, Part 2"	May 6, 2009	
#3	"Liar's Poker, Part 3"	June 3, 2009	
#4	"Liar's Poker, Part 4"	July 1, 2009	

== Reception ==
Daredevil Noir gained positive reviews by fans and critics. The fourth issue was highly praised for both the story and the artwork as Comixtreme.com gave an overall 5 out of 5.

Anthony Avina of Comic Book Resources ranked Daredevil Noir last among the 10 most powerful heroes of Marvel Noir. Margaret Rojahn of Screen Rant ranked Daredevil Noir as the third best Marvel Noir comic. Rhenn Taguiam of GameRant ranked Daredevil Noir as the 9th best noir comic from Marvel. Jack Pecau of ComicBook.com ranked Daredevil Noir as the second best Marvel Noir comic.

== In other media ==
- The Noir versions of Daredevil and Elektra appear as playable characters in the video game Lego Marvel Super Heroes 2 (2017).
