= Marvel Noir =

Marvel Comics noir and pulp titles

"Marvel Noir" thematic stories
- Teaser image for X-Men Noir #1. Art by Dennis Calero.

Publication information
- Publisher: Marvel Comics
- Schedule: Monthly
Title(s)
- Daredevil Noir #1–4
- Iron Man Noir #1–4
- Luke Cage Noir #1–4
- Punisher Noir #1–4
- Spider-Man Noir #1–4
- Spider-Man Noir: Eyes Without a Face #1–4
- Spider-Man Noir: Twilight in Babylon #1–5
- Weapon X Noir #1
- Wolverine Noir #1–4
- X-Men Noir #1–4
- X-Men Noir: Mark of Cain #1–4
- Genre: Crime, superhero
- Publication date: February 2009 – December 2026
- Number of issues: 42 issues over 10 limited series and a one-shot
- Main character(s): Daredevil Iron Man Luke Cage Punisher Spider-Man Noir Wolverine X-Men

Creative team
- Writer(s): David Hine; Fabrice Sapolsky; Fred Van Lente; Alexander Irvine; Scott Snyder; Margaret Stohl; Erik Larsen
- Artist(s): Carmine Di Giandomenico; Dennis Calero; Tomm Coker; Manuel Garcia; Juan Ferreyra

Marvel Noir is a 2009–2010 Marvel Comics alternative continuity combining elements of film noir and pulp fiction with the Marvel Universe. The central premise of the mini-series replaces superpowers with driven, noir-flavored characterization. The reality of Marvel Noir is Earth-90214.

== Publication history ==
The idea for Marvel Noir began when Fabrice Sapolsky, editor of the French magazine Comic Box, pitched the idea of a 1930s pulp version of Spider-Man to David Hine in December 2006. This led to the announcement of Marvel Noir which would feature four mini-series, beginning in December 2008 with Spider-Man Noir and X-Men Noir, later followed by Daredevil Noir and Wolverine Noir. Five more series followed, with Luke Cage Noir and Punisher Noir beginning in August 2009, the sequel series Spider-Man Noir: Eyes Without a Face and X-Men Noir: Mark of Cain beginning in December 2009, and the final series Iron Man Noir beginning in April 2010. Additionally, a Weapon X Noir one-shot was published in March 2010. In 2020, Spider-Man Noir returned with a five-issue limited series later collected as Spider-Man Noir: Twilight In Babylon.

In 2025, it was announced that Erik Larsen was returning to Marvel to write a new Spider-Man Noir mini-series, with art by Andrea Broccardo.

== List of series ==
Title	# Issues	Cover Date	Writer	Artist
Spider-Man Noir	4	Feb 2009 – May 2009	David Hine (co-plotted by Fabrice Sapolsky)	Carmine Di Giandomenico
X-Men Noir	4	Feb 2009 – May 2009	Fred Van Lente	Dennis Calero
Daredevil Noir	4	Jun 2009 – Sep 2009	Alexander Irvine	Tomm Coker
Wolverine Noir	4	Jun 2009 – Sep 2009	Stuart Moore	C. P. Smith
Luke Cage Noir	4	Oct 2009 – Jan 2010	Mike Benson and Adam Glass	Shawn Martinbrough
Punisher Noir	4	Oct 2009 – Jan 2010	Frank Tieri	Paul Azaceta
Spider-Man Noir: Eyes Without a Face	4	Feb 2010 – May 2010	David Hine (co-plotted by Fabrice Sapolsky)	Carmine Di Giandomenico
X-Men Noir: Mark of Cain	4	Feb 2010 – May 2010	Fred Van Lente	Dennis Calero
Weapon X Noir	1	May 2010	Dennis Calero	Dennis Calero
Iron Man Noir	4	Jun 2010 – Sep 2010	Scott Snyder	Manuel Garcia
Spider-Man Noir: Twilight in Babylon	5	May 2020 – Dec 2020	Margaret Stohl	Juan Ferreyra
Spider-Man Noir	5	Oct 2025 – Feb 2026	Erik Larsen	Andrea Broccardo

== Series ==
=== Iron Man Noir ===
During his latest expedition — accompanied by his aide James Rhodes, his assistant and lover Dr. Gialetta Nefaria, and Virgil Munsey, his chronicler for Marvels: A Magazine of Men's Adventure — adventurer Tony Stark discovers a cavern with a mysterious emerald mask in it. However, his attempts to claim the mask are interrupted when Gialetta reveals that she has betrayed him to aid the Nazis, in the form of the mysterious "Baron Zemo" and the ruthless Baron Strucker, the Nazis killing Virgil before Tony and Rhodes escape by starting a fire. Returning to America, where they meet their new chronicler Pepper Potts, who writes under the alias of 'Frank Finlay', Tony reveals that his father, Howard Stark, vanished years ago, and that he is suffering from a weak heart due to unspecified damage, requiring an electrical support.

Investigating Gialetta's desk, Tony discovers a journal hinting at the location of Atlantis, setting out on a trip with Captain Namor in his ship, the Dorma, in the hopes that he will discover Atlantis's mythical power source, orichalcum — a metal said to enhance power — to use it to repair his heart. While they recover a trident-head made of orichalcum from an underwater cavern, the Dorma is subsequently attacked by Zemo's forces — Gialetta now wearing the mask to hide the scars she received in the initial escape — Zemo escaping with Pepper as a hostage, forcing Tony, Rhodes and Namor to retreat to the ship's submarine, subsequently being picked up by Jarvis in an airship. Despite the increased damage to his heart, Tony decides to attempt to rescue Pepper using suits of armour he has developed based on some of his father's old sketches and ideas, attacking the Nazis in their castle base.

However, their rescue attempt takes a shocking turn when they find themselves facing an identical suit of armour, with Zemo unmasking to reveal his true identity of Howard Stark; "Zemo" is merely a title passed down to subjects who have been brainwashed by a unique chemical formula that leaves them loyal to the Nazis. Despite facing an army equipped with similar armors, Tony manages to destroy the Nazi army by supercharging the trident with the last dregs of his repulsor's energy, triggering an electric burst that destroys the air fleet. Returning home, Tony decides to abandon adventure and focus on making the world safer by eliminating real threats.

=== Luke Cage Noir ===
Luke Cage is a Harlem man who gains a reputation for being the bulletproof "Power Man" after attacking a corrupt police officer and being shot without any apparent injuries. After serving ten years behind bars for the fight, he returns home to a changed Harlem in a very segregated America during Prohibition.

Cage finds that an old friend of his, Willis Stryker, has become a major player in New York's underworld through bootlegging and other rackets. He goes to Stryker's nightclub seeking information on his pre-incarceration girlfriend Josephine Hall. Stryker tells him that Josephine died in an apartment fire, but Cage is quietly suspicious. Stryker offers Cage a job and is further impressed by Cage's handling of a vengeful pimp.

After leaving the nightclub, he is invited into a limousine by a wealthy white man named Randall Banticoff. He also offers Cage a job, in this case the investigation of his wife's (Daisy Banticoff) murder in Harlem. Cage accepts in exchange for the clearing of his criminal record. He gains admission to the city morgue and sees through bloating that the wife has been dead longer than has been reported.

Still bothered by Stryker's story, Cage goes to the cemetery and digs up Josephine's grave. He opens her coffin and finds it empty. He also sees a man named Tombstone standing over him with a shotgun and a pack of dogs. There is a flashback to a club where Cage sees a man acting inappropriately toward a dancer. Cage throws him out of the club and beats him, only to find that he was a cop. Tombstone is shown holding a gun to Cage to protect the cop. Back in the present, Cage finds a booklet from a church in the tombstone, gets knocked out by Tombstone and is told to leave town.

Cage goes out to investigate further but runs into Banticoff who gives him more money to continue the investigation. Cage sees officer Rachman get into a car across the street and follows him to a jazz lounge and sees money being given to a flapper named Jackie. Cage follows Jackie and ends up at her apartment. Jackie's man holds a shotgun to Cage's head, and Cage tells him that she has been with Banticoff. He is knocked out and wakes up to find a messy apartment, a lease to the apartment under his name, and the cops banging on the door. He realizes he was being set up. He escapes to the rooftop but is confronted by Tombstone, officer Rachman, and other cops. Rachman tries to arrest Cage for Daisy's murder. Cage rebuttals by saying that it was impossible because she was murdered before he was released from Prison, but Rachman holds forged release papers.

Cage creates a distraction which ends up in a fist fight with Tombstone, whose gun is stolen and used to shoot a supporting leg of a water tower, allowing Cage to escape. He goes to the church on the booklet he found in Josephine's tombstone and finds her there, disfigured. He immediately seeks out Stryker. Stryker offers Cage a farm in Maryland and cash. When asked why, Strykers says simply because Cage should be dead, but instead he is seen as a hero who could not be shot and killed. Stryker offers to take Cage out to buy new clothes, but Cage escapes by setting fire to the building.

He finds Jackie at a train station. He throws her onto the rails to make her talk. She reveals that Tombstone moved up in power for protecting the cop Cage attacked. Using that power and financial backing from someone downtown, he ran hooch, heroin, and prostitution rings in Harlem. Jackie goes on to reveal that Rachman went after Josephine when she rejected his advances, and Stryker aided in helping her disappear. Cage tries to save Jackie, but she gets hit by the train.

Cage goes back to Jackie's apartment to find photos of Daisy on the wall. He links them to a particular photographer and tracks him down. He finds out Rachman is somehow linked to the photos of Daisy. Cage goes to Stryker's nightclub for answers but does not find what he is looking for. He takes the money then sets fire to the place and is later shown putting the money in a safe deposit box. In a flashback, it is revealed that Cage was shot by Tombstone the night he attacked the officer, but the bullets had hit a metal flask in his jacket, and he was able to survive. Back in the present, it is revealed that Stryker and Tombstone are holding Lucas Cage Jr., Luke Cage's son, hostage. Randall Banticoff is shown being kidnapped but escapes to a police station.

Cage goes back to the morgue to get another look at Daisy's body to confirm his suspicion that the swelling was actually from her being pregnant. Someone had cut into her and removed the fetus. Tombstone followed Cage to the morgue and they fight. Tombstone reveals that Cage's incarceration was an elaborate set-up: Tombstone needed a cop on his side to run his illegal rackets. He tells Rachman that a dancer at the club, revealed to be Josephine, was interested in white men like Rachman. Recalling the previous flashback, it is revealed that Cage actually attacks Rachman for hitting on Josephine so that Tombstone could save him as a publicity stunt to gain favor with the cops. Tombstone was sent to kill Josephine but ends up disfiguring her instead. Cage is outraged and kills Tombstone. Rachman is waiting in a car outside. Cage, pretending to be Tombstone, drives the car and Rachman over a bridge to his death.

Cage goes to the church and finds out from Josephine that Stryker is holding Cage Jr. hostage as a shield. He puts the word out to Stryker to arrange a meeting. They end up at barbershop they both used to frequent. Stryker is there holding a sharp object to Cage Jr. Cage and Stryker engage in a fight, but the barber helps out, giving Cage a chance to finish off Stryker. A picture of several soldiers falls off the wall, and Cage pieces together the pieces to this case. He gives the key to the safe deposit box to his son before leaving.

He confronts Banticoff and lays the story out straight: one of the soldiers in the picture is revealed to be Banticoff. He was a buffalo soldier, a black soldier who saw freedom in Paris after the war but goes back home and is afraid of losing that freedom and respect. He reinvents himself as light-skinned, passing for white, and is accepted into upper-class society. He marries a wealthy socialite, using her money to finance Tombstone and his gang in Harlem. In a twist, Daisy announces she is pregnant, despite Banticoff becoming sterile due to an accident during the war. He is fearful that the child would bring to light his identity and decides to kill her before she can give birth. He needs someone to pin it on, someone like Cage. Banticoff is flustered and shoots Cage, who's seemingly unharmed. Cage then throws Banticoff out the window to his death.

Cage is not actually bulletproof in this reality. He dies from his bullet wound from Banticoff, but remains a legend in his community for taking multiple gunshots and escaping seemingly unscathed.

=== Punisher Noir ===
The story begins in 1935 Manhattan with an unknown man, later to be identified as Frank Castle, waking up and turning on his radio, during which he is seen with several bullet marks across his back. In the following scenes, a radio broadcast airs detailing a lone vigilante, all the while the still unnamed man gets dressed, which includes preparing a couple grenades, knives, brass knuckles, and two pistols with the Punisher skull on them. Just as the man dons a mask with the same skull, the radio broadcast identifies the lone vigilante as the Punisher.

Flashbacks detail Frank Castle's actions during World War I, and provide the story behind the Punisher's famous logo. The logo was Frank's way of 'taking the piss' out of his wife's fear that he would be claimed by the angel of death. Frank Sr. is shown to be a skilled soldier, taking out an entire trench of Germans with a pair of pistols (the same pistols his son is seen using). After the war, he is traveling on a train, when he is ambushed by Noir's version of the Russian. After a brutal fight which takes Frank and the Russian onto the roof of the train, Frank manages to defeat the Russian by slipping a live grenade down his pants and kicking him off the train.

In 1928, Frank's wife has died of cancer, and he is left to raise their son on his own. Frank teaches his son much of his combat knowledge, teaching the boy to shoot a gun and explaining the ins and outs of combat. Frank also refuses to pay protection money to the local crime boss (Dutch Schultz), earning the crime boss' wrath. Frank falls in with a gang of bullies, but eventually leaves the gang after refusing to rob a Church. Frank, however, is killed by a trio of hitmen hired by Dutch: Noir's version of Jigsaw, Barracuda, and a mystery assassin referred to as "She." Upon learning of his father's murder, Frank Jr. swears revenge on all those responsible.

Returning to 1935, Frank (this version's Punisher, as opposed to the mainstream's continuity where the father is), is shown systematically hunting down those responsible for his father's death. He first ambushes Barracuda at a carnival after-hours. After failing to learn the identity of "She" from Barracuda, he executes him. Frank Jr. then allows himself to be subdued by Jigsaw. Jigsaw tortures Frank Jr., carving the image of the skull into his chest with a knife (which resembles the tattoo that his father had received during the war). In a moment of hubris, Jigsaw reveals the identity of "She." Frank Jr. then reveals he had freed himself of his restraints hours ago, and proceeds to strangle Jigsaw.

"She" is in fact the Russian. The grenade's explosion had in fact castrated him, but taking this in stride, the Russian began wearing a wig and dress. The Punisher confronts the Russian at the Bronx Zoo. After a long fight, the Punisher finally kills the Russian. Throwing his mask onto the Russian's corpse (framing the Russian for the murders), Frank guns down Dutch Schultz, before retiring into the night. Detective Martin Soap (who in this incarnation is much more competent than his mainstream counterpart), deduces that the Russian was not the Punisher, because Schultz was killed several hours after the Russian's body was discovered. This leaves the Punisher's identity a mystery to the police.

Frank, left without purpose after exacting his revenge, walks the streets. In a conversation with his father's tombstone, he asks if he should move on to "Luciano" or "Capone", if he should continue to "punish". Frank receives his answer from a newspaper article, where Adolf Hitler's picture is seen.

=== Spider-Man Noir ===
Set in 1932 during the Great Depression, New York is overrun by crime and corruption. Much of the city is controlled by crime boss Norman Osborn, also known as the "Goblin," who employs a group of violent enforcers including the Vulture, Kraven the Hunter, and the Enforcers.

Unlike his Earth-616 counterpart, Peter Parker in this universe gains his abilities after being bitten by a mystical spider contained in one of Osborn's shipments, which was tied to ancient rituals. The spider bite is described less as a scientific accident and more as a supernatural curse, granting Peter enhanced strength, agility, a spider-sense, rapid healing, and the ability to spin dark, organic webs.

Peter's family background is also significantly different in this version. Aunt May is portrayed as a political activist and social reformer, while Uncle Ben was a war veteran who fought in World War I before being murdered by Osborn’s men. This tragedy heavily influences Peter’s sense of justice and fuels his crusade against organized crime.

Early in the story, journalist Ben Urich becomes Peter's mentor, offering him work as a photographer at the Daily Bugle. Though their relationship is strained—Urich is morally conflicted and struggles with his own compromises—they develop a father–son bond. Urich's eventual death at the hands of Osborn's men pushes Peter fully into his role as Spider-Man.

=== Spider-Man Noir: Eyes Without a Face ===
Eyes Without a Face is a direct sequel to Spider-Man Noir and take place roughly eight months after the events in that series. Franklin D. Roosevelt has been elected president and the U.S. economy is improving after the Great Depression. This along with the fact that Norman Osborn is no longer in the picture has Peter Parker feeling optimistic about the future of his city.

=== Spider-Man Noir: Twilight in Babylon ===
Twilight in Babylon takes place a month after Peter Parker teamed up with Miles Morales during the "Spider-Verse" storyline.

=== Weapon X Noir ===
Weapon X Noir follows the exploits of Kurt Wagner in his circus days, prior to his meeting up with Charles Xavier.

Kurt and Jimaine Szardos, also known as the Demon and the Red Rose, respectively, are engaged and working for a traveling circus. One of their stops takes place in Transia. In attendance of the show is Prince Wyn'Garde, who along with his cousin, plans to steal Jimaine from Kurt. Before the show commences, Wyn'Garde steps forward and speaks through a megaphone to the audience, as part of his attempt to woo Jimaine. After he is done speaking, a chair contraption is revealed from under a blanket and the prince is invited to sit in it by both Kurt and Jimaine but he refuses, so Kurt straps himself in instead. While Kurt is lifted up into the air, a gun is fired and Wyn'Garde is shot and murdered.

Kurt is locked away in a black tower to be interrogated and as punishment for the prince's murder. Wyn'Garde's cousin is leading the assault on Kurt until one of the king's men, Fenris shows up to help with the interrogation.

=== Wolverine Noir ===
The story takes place in New York's Bowery in 1937, where private detective James Logan has to solve a mysterious case in which he has to face his own dark past as well.

Logan and his partner Dog are sitting in their office as an attractive mysterious woman named Mariko comes in. She hires them to find out who is following her out of the hotel owned by a man named Creed. Dog, thinking it will be no problem, takes it from Logan and leaves for Creed's hotel. Dog fights two men, asking them where Creed is.

Logan begins to think of his childhood as Dog leaves. His father is a devout and strict preacher who punishes him often. The only people in Logan's peer group whom he has any kind of relationship are Dog and Rose. Dog is the son of one of the maintenance men on his father's property and he would constantly bully and torment young James and he fell in love with Rose. To escape from his father, he learns to fight with knives from the gardener, Smitty, until he is caught after trying to stab Dog in a fight, getting Smitty fired. It does not stop Logan from training with him until he dies from alcoholism. After deciding to marry Rose, James goes to the garden to profess his love for her. Arriving early, however, he sees that she is having an affair with none other than Dog. Enraged, Logan takes out his knives left to him by Smitty and blacks out, waking up covered in blood and Dog scared and in a childlike state.

=== X-Men Noir ===
The X-Men of this reality are a group of sociopathic teenagers recruited by discredited psychiatrist Charles Xavier, who ran the "Xavier School for Gifted Youngsters" in Westchester, New York in 1937. There, he took in juvenile delinquents and instead of reforming them, he further trained them in various criminal talents due to his belief that sociopathy was the next state in human behavioral evolution. The paper in which he stated this led to his expulsion from the American Psychological Association and as of the first issue, he is interned at Ryker's Island, awaiting charges after the truth about his reform school was made public. Jean Grey is depicted as the grifter of the X-Men; adept at running scams, she gained a reputation as being able to control the minds of men. In the opening of the series, her body is found washed up near Welfare Island in the East River, covered in slash marks grouped in threes.

Eric Magnus is the Chief of Detectives in the NYPD Homicide Department, a firm believer in eugenics, and the leader of the secret society that rules over most of the organized crime in the city, the Brotherhood. His son, Peter, a former track star, has just joined Homicide, partnered with Fred Dukes, and his daughter, Wanda, is a spoiled socialite who started a relationship with reporter Thomas Halloway, also known as the Angel, a costumed vigilante. At the same time, she is also involved with Remy LeBeau, a casino owner with connections to Unus the Untouchable, a local crime boss and enemy of Magnus. Also involved is Irish heroin dealer Sean Cassidy, a former inmate of the Welfare Pen and one of Tom's childhood mentors.

The rest of the X-Men, made up by Scott "Cyclops" Summers, Bobby "Iceman" Drake, and Hank "Beast" McCoy, are on the run following the arrest of their mentor. Xavier, who refused to ally his students with Lensherr's Brotherhood, was arrested after one of the X-Men, Warren Worthington III, apparently committed suicide by jumping off the roof thinking he could fly. It is revealed by Iceman that Warren was really thrown off the roof by the Brotherhood when Xavier refused. Magnus, as it turns out, owes most of his success to Sebastian Shaw, the leader of the Hellfire Club who holds nearly the entire city of New York in the palm of his hand, including the mayor, the D.A., and the police department. Magnus (whose last name is revealed to be Magnisky, which the Ellis Island immigration agent misheard as Magnus), is seeking out Anna-Marie, one of Xavier's students with a talent for mimicry, on behalf of Shaw so that they may use her against Unus in their quest to take complete control of the city's underworld. Also tied up in this tangled web of deceit is Captain Logan, a bootlegger and former flame of Jean, who operates out of Chinatown with his first mate Eugene.

Magnus confronts Anne-Marie on the roof of the police station, but she kills him. The Angel realizes that she is really Jean Grey, who killed the real Anne-Marie Rankin and took her place, because she wanted to avoid being studied by Xavier or exploited by Magnus. She says she knows Tommy cannot kill, but Angel reveals that he is Robert Halloway, Tommy's twin brother, and pushes them both off the roof. Cyclops and Tommy commiserate before getting on Logan's boat and heading to Madripoor.

A back-up text story, "The Sentinels", by Bolivar Trask, is a pastiche of period science fiction, presented as though published in a pulp magazine called Scienti-Fiction. In it, Nimrod, one of a society of genetic supermen called Sentinels, must try and save his beloved, Rachel, from the "muties" who live in the tunnels beneath New New New York. However, Rachel claims not to want to be saved, as the muties have shown her the truth. Nimrod discovers that Dr. Steven Lang, the eugenic engineer who created the Sentinels, was not killed by the muties, but left for dead by the Breeders' Council when he protested that their policies were oppressive and saved by Callisto, Queen of the Muties. More Sentinels led by Bastion invade the tunnels, and Rachel and Lang are killed. Nimrod uses a Phoenix Bomb built by the mad Egyptian En Sabah Nur to destroy the Breeders' Council, but also destroys the whole of New New York, and the muties' tunnels. He and Callisto are the only survivors, and conclude they will have to combine Sentinel and mutie genes "the old fashioned way".

=== X-Men Noir: Mark of Cain ===
Mark of Cain is a direct sequel to X-Men Noir. Professor X has been released from jail. The story finds him and his beloved X-Men and everyone scrambling to locate the Gem of Cyttorak. In the dark and steamy jungles of Madripoor, the flashing claws of Logan, the blazing bullets of Cyclops, and the dashing fists of the Angel met with wave after wave of berserk headhunters, all willing to protect the secrets of the Temple-Tomb of Cyttorak with their lives. The ancient treasure map of mercenary Cain Marko, with its siren-song of the priceless gigantic ruby of the fabled god-king, had lured them only into the icy claws of death.

== Collected editions ==
The entire series was also collected in hardcovers and trade paperbacks format.

Title	Material collected	Format	Publisher	Released dates	ISBN
Spider-Man Noir	Spider-Man Noir #1-4	HC	Marvel Comics	May 27, 2009	978-0785139447
Spider-Man Noir	Spider-Man Noir #1-4	TPB	Marvel Comics	July 6, 2011	978-0785129233
Spider-Man Noir: Eyes Without a Face	Spider-Man Noir: Eyes Without a Face #1-4	HC	Marvel Comics	June 3, 2010	978-0785144441
Spider-Man Noir: Eyes Without a Face	Spider-Man Noir: Eyes Without a Face #1-4	TPB	Marvel Comics	December 1, 2010	978-0785144502
Spider-Man Noir: The Complete Collection	Spider-Man Noir #1-4, Spider-Man Noir: Eyes Without a Face #1-4, Edge of Spider-Verse #1, Spider-Geddon: Spider-Man Noir Video Comic, and material from Spider-Verse Team-Up #1	TPB	Marvel Comics	May 29, 2019	978-1302919580
X-Men Noir	X-Men Noir #1-4	HC	Marvel Comics	October 7, 2009	978-0785139461
X-Men Noir	X-Men Noir #1-4	TPB	Marvel Comics	October 7, 2009	978-0785131830
X-Men Noir: Mark of Cain	X-Men Noir: Mark of Cain #1-4	HC	Marvel Comics	June 23, 2010	978-0785142751
X-Men Noir: Mark of Cain	X-Men Noir: Mark of Cain #1-4	TPB	Marvel Comics	June 23, 2010	978-0785144373
Daredevil Noir	Daredevil Noir #1-4	HC	Marvel Comics	November 18, 2009	978-0785139416
Daredevil Noir	Daredevil Noir #1-4	TPB	Marvel Comics	April 7, 2010	978-0785121541
Wolverine Noir	Wolverine Noir #1-4	HC	Marvel Comics	October 21, 2009	978-0785139454
Wolverine Noir	Wolverine Noir #1-4	TPB	Marvel Comics	April 28, 2010	978-0785135470
Luke Cage Noir	Luke Cage Noir #1-4	HC	Marvel Comics	August 4, 2010	978-0785139423
Luke Cage Noir	Luke Cage Noir #1-4	TPB	Marvel Comics	August 4, 2010	978-0785135456
Punisher Noir	Punisher Noir #1-4	HC	Marvel Comics	September 29, 2010	978-0785139430
Punisher Noir	Punisher Noir #1-4	TPB	Marvel Comics	September 29, 2010	978-2809415780
Iron Man Noir	Iron Man Noir #1-4	HC	Marvel Comics	February 2, 2011	978-0785147275
Iron Man Noir	Iron Man Noir #1-4	TPB	Marvel Comics	February 2, 2011	978-0785147282
Marvel Noir: Wolverine & the X-Men	X-Men Noir #1-4, Wolverine Noir #1-4, X-Men Noir: Mark of Cain #1-4, and Weapon X Noir #1	TPB	Marvel Comics	February 27, 2013	978-0785183822
Marvel Noir: Spider-Man/Punisher	Spider-Man Noir #1-4, Spider-Man Noir: Eyes Without a Face #1-4, and Punisher Noir #1-4	TPB	Marvel Comics	May 29, 2013	978-0785183860
Marvel Noir: Daredevil/Cage/Iron Man	Daredevil Noir #1-4, Luke Cage Noir #1-4, and Iron Man Noir #1-4	TPB	Marvel Comics	June 12, 2013	978-0785184041

== Reception ==
Daredevil Noir gained positive reviews by fans and critics. The fourth issue was highly praised for both the story and the artwork as Comixtreme.com gave an overall 5 out of 5.

Spider-Man Noir gained mixed to positive reception from critics and fans, but they still found the series enjoyable; IGN rate the first issue 6.1 out of 10, with the second issue rated 6.9 out of 10. Timothy Callahan from ComicBookResources.com gave a positive review commented "Hine, Sapolsky and Di Giandomenico's Spider-Man Noir has been a violent, action-packed romp since the first issue". Adam Chapman from Comixtreme.com praised the artwork and also gave a positive review commented "Di Giandomenico once again provides some truly outstanding artwork...Whenever he's on a book, I know it's going to look absolutely magnificent..."

Wolverine Noir was given mostly mixed to negative reviews, however critics praised both the story and the artwork. Adam Chapman from Comixtreme.com gave the third issue an overall 4 out of 5, the fourth issue an overall 5 out of 5.

Luke Cage Noir was given a Glyph Comics Award for "Fan Award for Best Comic" in 2010.

== In other media ==
=== Television ===
- Spider-Man and Mary Jane Watson Noir as well as the Marvel Noir reality appear in Ultimate Spider-Man. Additionally, Noir incarnations of Hammerhead, Joe Fixit, Mister Negative, Rick Jones, and Thunderbolt Ross appear as well.
- Spider-Man Noir and the Marvel Noir reality appear in Spider-Noir, with the former portrayed by Nicolas Cage.

=== Film ===
- Spider-Man Noir and the Marvel Noir reality appear in Spider-Man: Into the Spider-Verse and its sequel Spider-Man: Across the Spider-Verse, with the former voiced by Nicolas Cage.
- Spider-Man Noir serves as inspiration for the stealth suit that appears in Spider-Man: Far From Home.
- The Marvel Noir reality makes a cameo appearance in Doctor Strange in the Multiverse of Madness.

=== Video games ===
- Marvel Noir versions of Spider-Man, Vulture, and Norman Osborn as well as the Marvel Noir reality appear in Spider-Man: Shattered Dimensions. Additionally, a Noir incarnation of Hammerhead appears as a boss in the Activision version of the game while Noir incarnations of Boomerang and Calypso appear in the Nintendo DS version.
- Spider-Man Noir appears as a playable character in Spider-Man Unlimited.
- The Marvel Noir reality serves as inspiration for "Manhattan Noir, which appears in Lego Marvel Super Heroes 2 as one of several components used by Kang the Conqueror to make Chronopolis. Additionally, a Noir incarnation of Elektra appears as well.
- Spider-Man Noir's suit appears as an unlockable alternate skin in Marvel's Spider-Man.

=== Miscellaneous ===
Marvel Noir serves as inspiration for an expansion to Legendary: A Marvel Deck Building Game.

== See also ==
- Crime comics
- Film noir
