= The Black Monday Murders =

Monthly comic book series

- Cover of The Black Monday Murders #1. Art by Tomm Coker.

Publication information
- Publisher: Image Comics
- Schedule: On Hiatus
- Format: Ongoing series
- Publication date: August 2016
- No. of issues: 8

Creative team
- Created by: Jonathan Hickman, Tomm Coker
- Written by: Jonathan Hickman
- Artist: Tomm Coker

The Black Monday Murders is an American monthly comic book series published by Image Comics which debuted in August 2016. Created by writer Jonathan Hickman and artist Tomm Coker, the book combines elements of noir fiction, horror, and mystery.

== Plot ==
The series takes place in the aftermath of Black Monday, the stock market crash of 1987. The story concerns a group of elite financiers who have made a blood pact with a god, in exchange for power and wealth. A second narrative strand follows NYPD detective Theodore Dumas, as he unravels the secrets of magic at the heart of the global financial market.

According to Hickman, "This is a book about schools of magic. The only difference being that instead of schools of magic, it's financial institutions. Power is accumulated through wealth. It's about a bunch of guys, a bunch of schools, that gathered together and generated a financial collapse in order to attain power".

== Reception ==
Reviewing the first issue, IGN's Jesse Schedeen called it "another worthwhile addition to the Jonathan Hickman canon", praising its denseness and tone, while also mentioning that these elements might also make it somewhat unapproachable for first time readers of Hickman's work.
