= Blood & Water =

- Cover of the first issue

Publication information
- Publisher: Vertigo
- Schedule: Monthly
- Format: Limited series
- Publication date: May–September 2003
- No. of issues: 5

Creative team
- Written by: Judd Winick
- Artist(s): Tomm Coker; Brian Bolland (covers)
- Colorist(s): Jason Wright; Digital Chameleon

Blood & Water is a five-issue horror comic book limited series written by Judd Winick and illustrated by Tomm Coker, with covers by Brian Bolland. It was published by Vertigo Comics from March to July 2003, with cover dates of May to September.

It stars Adam Heller, a young man with a terminal illness whose friends offer to save his life by turning him into a vampire, an act that leads to unforeseen consequences.

== Full credits ==
- Writer: Judd Winick
- Artist: Tomm Coker
- Colors: Jason Wright and Digital Chameleon
- Covers: Brian Bolland
- Letters: Kurt Hathaway
- Editors: Mariah Huehner & Heidi MacDonald

== Plot ==
San Francisco resident Adam Heller is a young man who had a bright future ahead of him. But a case of food poisoning when he was twenty gave him hepatitis A, forcing him to drop out of college, and taking his once-athletic body away from him. He has just been told of an inoperable hepatoma on his liver, and has not long to live.

Adam's best friend of five years, Joshua, and his lover, Nicole, tell him that they are vampires, and want to mutate him into one to save his life. Adam is frightened, but they explain that vampires are not villains who attack innocent humans, and only drink animal blood, because human blood turns vampires into irreversible psychotics that the vampire community must then "take out". Although crosses and daylight are not fatal to them, they are sensitive to light, and wear sunblock and sunglasses regularly. They are immortal (Nicole is 278 years old), never become sick, and have five times the strength of humans, though they can die if they bleed to death or experience massive tissue loss.

Adam agrees to mutate into a vampire, and drinks some of their blood. After a painful metamorphosis, he is born anew, the ills suffered by his body having disappeared. Adam enjoys his new life, the powers he has, and the sex that he hasn't had in three years.

One night, Josh is attacked and mauled by a mysterious assailant. Taking refuge at Adam's apartment before he dies, Josh begs Adam to make sure he is cremated within twenty-four hours, because vampires who die without cremation return as emotionless zombies. After Josh dies, Adam and Nicky are joined by other members of the vampire community at a wooded ceremonial plot outside of Santa Cruz. Malcolm, the oldest living vampire, and the greatest hunter-tracker among them, says only another vampire could have killed Josh, and that a unit of the Taveen, a sort of royal guard of the vampire race, is already investigating. He refuses to help, however, because he is no longer Taveen, and is done hunting vampires. An altercation ensues, and Adam strikes Malcolm, sending him flying through the trees, much to the shock of the crowd, who wonder how a month-old vampire could do this to one of the Ancient Ones. Malcolm says that Adam is "old blood", calling him "Tribe". Nicky is horrified at this, and the other vampires flee in terror.

Nicky explains that thousands of years ago, a sect of vampires called the Tribe developed that, unlike other vampires, feasted on humans, and later, other vampires, altering them physiologically and mentally, becoming ferocious creatures whose strength dwarfed that of normal vampires. Unlike normal vampires, they procreated, and their children were mostly abandoned, murdered or devoured. They eventually turned on each other, and a myth began that they fell into hibernation, and would only be awakened by the smell of one of their own. It was feared that some of the Tribe's abandoned children would be found and raised by humans, their true nature remaining dormant as long as they did not feed on blood. Adam is apparently a descendant of the Tribe, and when Josh and Nicky altered him, this awakened a dormant member of that race, which came for him, attacking Josh because Adam's blood smells like that of his maker.

Adam and Nicky return to San Francisco, and wait for the creature in Golden Gate Park. Adam confesses that he did not get Hepatitis A from food poisoning, but from a dirty heroin needle. He and Nicky are then attacked by three of the Tribe. Malcolm arrives to assist Adam and Nicky, and Adam kills the Tribe. Nicky tells Adam that she must leave in order to grieve Josh, but jokingly tells Adam that since he's the only vampire in existence who can procreate, she might return to him one day.

== Critical reception ==
At the review aggregator website Comic Book Roundup, the series holds a score of 7.0 out of 10, based on three reviews for the first two issues.

Don MacPherson of thefourthrail.com, reviewing the first issue, was surprised by the range of Winick's writing, stating that Winick's strong characterization was the common element in his humor, biographical, and superhero comics, and now showed in his horror work. He commended the stark, textured realism of Tomm Coker's art, and the surreal tone added by Jason Wright's colors. MacPherson was impressed by Winick and Coker's depiction of Adam's hepatitis, which with Josh and Nicky's offbeat characters, added a mature, twisted sense of fun to the story.

Randy Lander, reviewing the second issue, referred to the vampire material as "great", praising Josh and Nicky's humor, and the concrete terms with which Winick described things, like the taste of the blood concoction, the way vampires live and eat, and the anecdote about vampire celebrities. Lander praised Coker's art as "moody but not too dark", able to convey both the humor and the horror, particularly Adam's hallucinations as he undergoes his mutation.

Rick Dakan of Pop-Comics.com also saw the artwork as "very strong and moody" and perfectly suited to the story, but thought the story's pace was somewhat slow. He nonetheless thought Winick handled the exposition of issue #2 well, and enjoyed it as much as the first issue.
