= Tomm Coker =

American comic book artist and film director

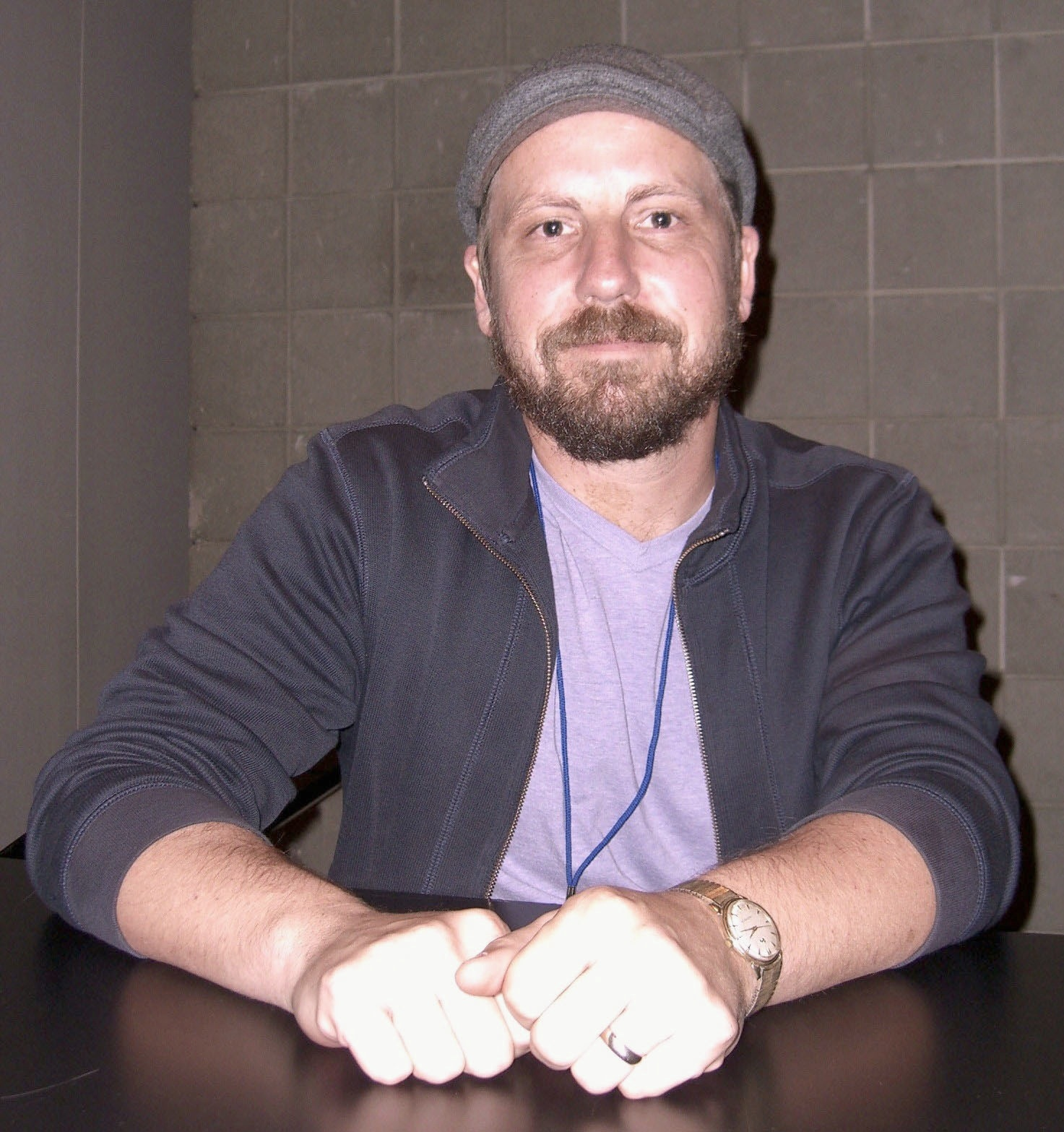
- Coker at the New York Comic Con in Manhattan, October 9, 2010.
- Born: Thomas Coker; November 3, 1972 (age 54) Sacramento, California, U.S.
- Areas: Comics artist, film director/writer
- Pseudonym: Thomas L. Coker

Tomm Coker, also known as Thomas L. Coker (born November 3, 1972), is an American comic book artist and film director/writer.

== Career ==
Coker's career started in the early nineties drawing comic books for Image Comics, Dark Horse Comics, Marvel Comics and DC Comics. Throughout the 1990s he worked on such titles as Gen 13 Bootleg, Nightfall: The Black Chronicles and Penthouse Comix.

After a short absence, he returned to comics in 2003, illustrating the popular Vertigo mini-series Blood & Water. This series also marked a stylistic change, in which his art evolved in a much more realistic direction.

His short film A Day Between premiered at the 2003 Sacramento International Film and Music Festival. His first feature-length film, Catacombs, starring Shannyn Sossamon and pop singer Pink, was released in 2007.

In 2009, he drew MTV's "motion comic" series Audio Quest: A Captain Lights Adventure, starring the singer Lights.

== Works ==
=== Films ===
- A Day Between (2003)
- Catacombs (2007)

=== Comics ===
- Nightfall: The Black Chronicles (with writer Ford Lytle Gillmore, Homage Comics, 1999–2000)
- Blood & Water (with writer Judd Winick, 5-issue mini-series, Vertigo, 2003)
- Daredevil Noir (with writer Alexander Irvine, 4-issue mini-series, Marvel Comics, 2009)
- Audio Quest: A Captain LIGHTS Adventure (with writer LIGHTS)
- Undying Love (with Daniel Freedman, 4-issue mini-series, Image Comics, 2011)
- Near Death (Ongoing Series, Covers #1-5, Image Comics, 2011)
- The Black Monday Murders (with writer Jonathan Hickman, ongoing series, 2016-...)

=== Role-playing games ===
- Eberron Campaign Setting (2004)
- Sharn: City of Towers (2004)
