= John Grant (children's author) =

Scottish author and illustrator

John Grant (22 May 1930 – 23 February 2014) was a Scottish author and illustrator, possibly best known as the author of the Littlenose series of children's stories, which he read on the BBC's Jackanory in 55 programmes from 1968 to 1986.

Grant was born in Edinburgh on 22 May 1930. As a student, he earned extra cash illustrating learned academic papers and designing menus, toast lists and illuminated addresses, and during national service he drew cartoons for the official British Army magazine Soldier.

He originally invented Littlenose to entertain his children, but failed to find a publisher until BBC commissioned him to both write and present his stories of a little Neanderthal boy who was always getting into trouble. These proved a great success, and he went on to write and illustrate over 13 Littlenose books between 1968 and 1993.

Grant died in Edinburgh on 23 February 2014, leaving his wife Elizabeth, children Euann, Niall, Kirsty and Andrew, as well as six grandchildren.

== Books written and illustrated by John Grant ==
- Littlenose
- Littlenose and the Bear Hunt
- Littlenose and Two-Eyes
- Littlenose Goes South
- Littlenose Moves House
- Littlenose the Explorer
- Littlenose the Fisherman
- Littlenose the Hero
- Littlenose the Hunter
- Littlenose the Joker
- Littlenose the Leader
- Littlenose the Marksman
- Littlenose to the Rescue
- Littlenose's Birthday
- The Reivers

== Books written by John Grant ==
- Anthony Ant and the Cave Dwellers
- Anthony Ant and the Falling Star
- Anthony Ant and the Flea Circus
- Henry Hound: Henry the Artist
- Kidnapped, an adaptation of Robert Louis Stevenson's novel Kidnapped
- Masters of the Universe: A Trap For He-Man
- Masters of the Universe: Castle Grayskull Under Attack
- Masters of the Universe: He-Man and the Asteroid of Doom
- Masters of the Universe: He-Man and the Lost Dragon
- Masters of the Universe: He-Man Meets the Beast
- Masters of the Universe: Skeletor's Ice Attack
- Masters of the Universe: The Iron Master
- Masters of the Universe: Wings of Doom
- Pirates: Adventures on Shark Island
- Pirates: Captain Roger's Birthday
- Pirates: The Royal Visit
- Pirates: Will and the Gold Chase
- Princess of Power: Shadow Weaver's Magic Mirror
- Princess of Power: She-Ra and the Surprise Party
- Storytime for 7 Year Olds
- The Adventures of Robin Hood
- The Flintstones: Brontonappers
- The Flintstones: Fred the Fisherman
- The Lonely Lion
- Transformers: Autobot Hostage
- Transformers: Autobots Fight Back
- Transformers: Autobots Lightning Strike
- Transformers: Autobots Strike Oil
- Transformers: Decepticon's Hideout
- Transformers: Decepticons at the Pole
- Transformers: Galvatron's Air Attack
- Transformers: Laserbeak's Fury
- Transformers: Megatron's Fight for Power
