= Alex Irvine =

American writer (born 1969)

- Born: Alexander Christian Irvine; March 22, 1969 (age 57); Ypsilanti, Michigan, U.S.
- Education: University of Michigan (BA); University of Maine (MA); University of Denver (PhD)
- Occupations: Writer; lecturer; reporter
- Writing career
- Genres: Science fiction, supernatural

Alexander Christian Irvine (born March 22, 1969) is an American fantasy and science fiction author.

== Early life and education ==
Irvine has a B.A. from the University of Michigan (1991), an M.A. from the University of Maine (1996), and a Ph.D. from the University of Denver (2003). From 2005-11, he was an assistant professor of English at the University of Maine.

He worked for a time as a reporter at The Phoenix.

== Career ==
Irvine has worked on alternate reality games including The Beast (2001) and I Love Bees, and is the writer of the Facebook game Marvel Avengers Alliance (2012).

He first gained notability with his Locus Award–winning 2002 novel A Scattering of Jades (which also won the Crawford Award in 2003) and the stories that would form the 2003 collection Unintended Consequences. He has also published The Grail Quest novel One King, One Soldier (2004), and the World War II-era historical fantasy The Narrows (2005). He released a collection of thirteen short stories called Pictures from an Expedition in 2006.

He wrote The Vertigo Encyclopedia. As well as writing about comics, he has written a number of comic book series, including one featuring Daimon Hellstrom for the Marvel Comics imprint Max, Daredevil Noir, and Iron Man: The Rapture.

== Personal life ==
He is married with his wife Lindsay and has two children, a boy and a girl who are twins.

Irvine appeared on Jeopardy! in 2015. He was a one day champion, winning $26,000.

== Bibliography ==
=== Novels ===
- A Scattering of Jades (2002, ISBN 0-7653-0116-4)
- One King, One Soldier (2004, ISBN 0-345-46696-9)
- The Narrows (2005, ISBN 0-345-46698-5)
- The Life of Riley (2005, ISBN 1-59606-013-1)
- Buyout (2009, ISBN 0-345-49433-4)
- Mare Ultima. PS Publishing. 2012.
- Anthropocene Rag. 2020.

Licensed work

- Have Robot, Will Travel (2004, ISBN 1-59687-151-2)
- Batman: Inferno (October 2006, ISBN 0-345-47945-9)
- The Ultimates: Against All Enemies (2007, ISBN 1-4165-1071-0)
- The Supernatural Book of Monsters, Spirits, Demons, and Ghouls (September 2007, ISBN 0-06-136703-6)
- Supernatural: John Winchester's Journal (February 2009, ISBN 0-06-170662-0)
- Iron Man: Virus (January 2010)
- Iron Man 2 - The Novelization (April 2010, ISBN 978-0-446-56458-8)
- Transformers: Exodus (June 2010, ISBN 978-0-345-51985-6)
- Transformers: Exiles (2011)
- The Seal of Karga Kul: A Dungeons & Dragons Novel (December 2010)
- Star Wars: Mandorla (Cancelled)
- The Adventures of Tintin: A Novel (Movie Tie-In) (Little, Brown Books for Young Readers (November 2011, ISBN 0-316-18579-5)
- The Secret Journal of Ichabod Crane (2014, ISBN 9780553418989)
- Pacific Rim - The Novelization (2013)
- Phase One: Captain America: The First Avenger (2014, ISBN 9780316256322)
- Phase One: Iron Man (2014, ISBN 9780316256346)
- Dawn of the Planet of the Apes (Winner of the 2015 Scribe Award for Best Adapted Novel.)
- Batman: Arkham Knight - The Riddler's Gambit (Prequel to Batman: Arkham Knight) (June 2015, ISBN 9781783292509)
- Marvel Superheroes: Secret Wars (2015, ISBN 9780785191001)
- Phase One: Marvel's The Avengers (2015, ISBN 9780316256377)
- Phase One: The Incredible Hulk (2015, ISBN 9780316256339)
- Phase One: Thor (2015, ISBN 9780316256353)
- Phase Two: Marvel's Guardians of the Galaxy (2015, ISBN 9780316256759)
- Independence Day: Resurgence: The Novelization (2016, ISBN 9781785651311)
- Tom Clancy's The Division: New York Collapse (2016, ISBN 9781452148274)
- Phase Two: Marvel's Ant-Man (2016, ISBN 9780316256384)
- Power Rangers: The Official Movie Novelization (2017)
- Pacific Rim: Uprising - The Novelization (2018, ISBN 9781785657689)
- Tom Clancy's The Division: Broken Dawn (2019, ISBN 9781984803177)

=== Short fiction ===
Stories

Title	Year	First published	Reprinted/collected	Notes
Akenhaten	2001	Irvine, Alex (April 2001). "Akenhaten". F&SF. 100 (4): 112–124.		
Agent Provocateur	2002	Strange Horizons		
Black Friday	2018	Tor.com		
Chisel and chime	2020	F&SF (Jan/Feb 2020)		
Intimations of immortality		F&SF		
Mystery Hill	2009	Irvine, Alex (2009). Mystery Hill. PS Publishing.		Novella
Rosetti song	2000	Irvine, Alexander C. (March 2000). "Rosetti song". F&SF. 98 (3): 103–118.		

=== Comics ===
- Hellstorm: Son of Satan -- Equinox #1-5 (art by Russell Braun) (Marvel MAX, October 2006-February 2007)
- Daredevil Noir: Liar's Poker #1-4 (art by Tomm Coker) (Marvel, April–July 2009)
- The Murder of King Tut #1-5 (adapted from the novel by James Patterson, art by Christopher Mitten and Ron Randall) (IDW, June–October 2010)
- Iron Man: The Rapture #1-4 (art by Lan Medina) (Marvel Knights, November 2010-January 2011)
- Dungeons & Dragons: Dark Sun #1-5 (art by Peter Bergting) (IDW, January 2011-May 2011)
  - Dark Sun: Ianto's Tomb (August 14, 2012, ISBN 1-60010-996-9)
- Deus Ex: The Children's Crusade #1-5 (art by John Aggs) (Titan, February–June 2016)
- Deus Ex Universe: The Dawning Darkness (art by John Aggs) (Titan, August 2016)

=== Non-fiction ===
- Irvine, Alex (2008). Dougall, Alastair (ed.). The Vertigo Encyclopedia. New York: Dorling Kindersley. ISBN 978-0-7566-4122-1. OCLC 213309015.
- The Comic Book Story of Baseball: The Heroes, Hustlers, and History-making Swings (and Misses) of America's National Pastime (art by Tomm Coker and C.P. Smith) (Ten-Speed Press, 2019, ISBN 9780399578946)

== Screenwriting ==
- Transformers: Robots in Disguise (2015)

== Awards and honors ==
As listed in Contemporary Authors.

- Lennie Isaacs Memorial Award, Clarion Writer's Workshop, 1993
- Steve Grady Poetry Award, University of Maine, 1995
- Albert Morton Turner Essay Prize, University of Maine, 1995
- Technology in the First-Year English Classroom Award, University of Denver, 1999
- Travel and dissertation research grant, ColRoMorA Family Foundation, 1999
- Best Web site of the Year, Entertainment Weekly, for The Beast, 2001
- Best Ideas of the Year, The New York Times, for The Beast, 2001
- Pushcart Prize nomination for "Snapdragons", 2002
- Best First Novel, Locus, for A Scattering of Jades, 2003
- Best First Novel, International Horror Guild, for A Scattering of Jades, 2003
- Crawford Award for best first novel, for A Scattering of Jades, 2003
- International Association for the Fantastic in the Arts, for A Scattering of Jades, 2003
- New England Press Award for investigative journalism, 2004
- International Game Developers Association award for innovation, for I Love Bees, 2005
- Critic's choice award, 48-hour Film Project, for "Music Box", 2006
- The Year's Best Science Fiction and Fantasy, for "Wizard's Six", 2007
